= 1994 in professional wrestling =

1994 in professional wrestling describes the year's events in the world of professional wrestling.

== List of notable promotions ==
These promotions held notable events in 1994.

Promotion Name	Abbreviation	Notes
All Japan Women's Pro-Wrestling	AJW	
Asistencia Asesoría y Administración	AAA	
Catch Wrestling Association	CWA	
Consejo Mundial de Lucha Libre	CMLL	
Eastern/Extreme Championship Wrestling	ECW	In August, Eastern Championship Wrestling seceded from the National Wrestling Alliance (NWA) and became Extreme Championship Wrestling.
Frontier Martial-Arts Wrestling	FMW	
International Wrestling Council	IWC	
New Japan Pro-Wrestling	NJPW	
Universal Wrestling Association	UWA	
Universal Wrestling Federation	UWF	
World Championship Wrestling	WCW	
World Wrestling Council	WWC	
World Wrestling Federation	WWF	

== Calendar of notable shows ==
=== January ===
Date	Promotion(s)	Event	Location	Main Event
January 4	NJPW	Battlefield	Tokyo, Japan	Genichiro Tenryu defeated Antonio Inoki in a Singles match
January 22	WWF	Royal Rumble	Providence, Rhode Island, United States	Bret Hart and Lex Luger co-won the Royal Rumble by last eliminating each other in a 30-man Royal Rumble match for a WWF World Heavyweight Championship match at WrestleMania X
January 27	WCW	Clash of the Champions XXVI	Baton Rouge, Louisiana, United States	Sting and Ric Flair defeated Vader and Rick Rude in a tag team match
January 30	UWA	UWA 19th Anniversary Show	Naucalpan, Mexico	Yamato and Los Villanos (Villano III and Villano V) defeated El Canek, Gran Hamada and Transformer in a Best two out of three falls Six-man tag team match
(c) – denotes defending champion(s)

=== February ===
Date	Promotion(s)	Event	Location	Main Event
February 5	ECW	The Night the Line Was Crossed	Philadelphia, Pennsylvania, United States	Sabu, Shane Douglas, and Terry Funk (c) wrestled to a time limit draw in a Three way dance for the ECW Heavyweight Championship
February 20	WCW	SuperBrawl IV	Albany, Georgia, United States	Ric Flair (c) defeated Vader by submission in a Thundercage match for the WCW World Heavyweight Championship
(c) – denotes defending champion(s)

=== March ===
Date	Promotion(s)	Event	Location	Main Event
March 20	WWF	WrestleMania X	New York City, New York, United States	Bret Hart defeated Yokozuna (c) in a Singles match for the WWF Championship with Roddy Piper as special guest referee
March 26	ECW	Ultimate Jeopardy	Devon, Pennsylvania, United States	Shane Douglas, Mr. Hughes and the Public Enemy (Johnny Grunge and Rocco Rock) defeated Terry Funk (c), Road Warrior Hawk, Kevin Sullivan and the Tazmaniac by pinfall in an Ultimate Jeopardy Steel Cage match for the ECW Heavyweight Championship
(c) – denotes defending champion(s)

=== April ===
Date	Promotion(s)	Event	Location	Main Event
April 15	CMLL	International Gran Prix	Mexico City, Mexico	Emilio Charles Jr. defeated La Fiera in a Best two-out-of-three falls Lucha de Apuestas hair vs. hair match
April 15	CMLL	38. Aniversario de Arena México	Mexico City, Mexico	
April 17	WCW	Spring Stampede	Chicago, Illinois, United States	Ric Flair (c) fought Ricky Steamboat to a double pin in a Singles match for the WCW World Heavyweight Championship
April 26	AAA	Triplemanía II-A	Aguascalientes, Aguascalientes, Mexico	Heavy Metal defeated Jerry Estrada in a Lucha de Apuestas "Hair vs. Hair" match
(c) – denotes defending champion(s)

=== May ===
Date	Promotion(s)	Event	Location	Main Event
May 1	NJPW	Wrestling Dontaku	Fukuoka, Japan	Antonio Inoki defeated The Great Muta in a Singles match
May 5	FMW	FMW 5th Anniversary Show	Kawasaki, Kanagawa, Japan	Genichiro Tenryu defeated Atsushi Onita in a No Rope Exploding Barbed Wire Deathmatch
May 14	ECW	When Worlds Collide	Philadelphia, Pennsylvania, United States	Bobby Eaton and Sabu defeated Arn Anderson and Terry Funk by submission in a tag team match
May 15	AAA	Triplemanía II-B	Zapopan, Jalisco, Mexico	Konnan, Perro Aguayo, and Cien Caras defeated Jake Roberts, Love Machine, and Miguel Pérez Jr. in a Best two-out-of-three falls six-man "lucha libre rules" tag team match
May 22	WCW	Slamboree	Philadelphia, Pennsylvania, United States	Sting defeated Vader by pinfall in a Singles match for the vacant WCW International World Heavyweight Championship
May 27	AAA	Triplemanía II-C	Tijuana, Baja California, Mexico	Konnan defeated Jake Roberts in a Best two-out-of-three falls Lucha de Apuesta, "Hair vs. Hair" match
(c) – denotes defending champion(s)

=== June ===
Date	Promotion(s)	Event	Location	Main Event
June 19	WWF	King of the Ring	Baltimore, Maryland, United States	Roddy Piper defeated Jerry Lawler in a Singles match
June 23	WCW	Clash of the Champions XXVII	Charleston, South Carolina, United States	Ric Flair (c-WCW) defeated Sting (c-WCW International) in a Unification match for both the WCW and the WCW International World Heavyweight Championships
June 24	ECW	Hostile City Showdown	Philadelphia, Pennsylvania, United States	Sabu defeated Cactus Jack in a Singles match
(c) – denotes defending champion(s)

=== July ===
Date	Promotion(s)	Event	Location	Main Event
July 9	CWA	Euro Catch Festival in Graz	Graz, Austria	Rambo (c) defeated Papa Shango in Round 6 in a Singles match for the CWA World Heavyweight Championship
July 14	FMW	FMW/LLPW/AJW	Tokyo, Japan	Bull Nakano defeated Shinobu Kandori in a Chain match
July 16	ECW	Heat Wave	Philadelphia, Pennsylvania, United States	The Public Enemy (Rocco Rock and Johnny Grunge) defeated Terry Funk and Dory Funk, Jr. in a barbed wire match
July 17	WCW	Bash at the Beach	Orlando, Florida, United States	Hulk Hogan defeated Ric Flair (c) in a Singles match for the WCW World Heavyweight Championship
(c) – denotes defending champion(s)

=== August ===
Date	Promotion(s)	Event	Location	Main Event
August 6	WWC	WWC 21st Aniversario	Bayamón, Puerto Rico	Eddie Gilbert defeated Huracán Castillo, Jr. in a "Fire" match
August 7	NJPW	G1 Climax	Tokyo, Japan	Masahiro Chono defeated Power Warrior
August 13	ECW	Hardcore Heaven	Philadelphia, Pennsylvania, United States	Cactus Jack fought Terry Funk to a no-contest in a Singles match
August 24	WCW	Clash of the Champions XXVIII	Cedar Rapids, Iowa, United States	Ric Flair defeated Hulk Hogan (c) by countout in a Singles match for the WCW World Heavyweight Championship
August 27	ECW	NWA World Title Tournament	Philadelphia, Pennsylvania, United States	Shane Douglas defeated 2 Cold Scorpio by pinfall in a tournament final for the NWA World Heavyweight Championship
August 28	FMW	Summer Spectacular	Osaka, Japan	Atsushi Onita defeated Masashi Aoyagi via knockout in a No Ropes Electrified Explosive Barbed Wire Barricade Double Hell match
August 29	WWF	SummerSlam	Chicago, Illinois, United States	The Undertaker defeated The Undertaker in a Singles match
(c) – denotes defending champion(s)

=== September ===
Date	Promotion(s)	Event	Location	Main Event
September 18	WCW	Fall Brawl	Roanoke, Virginia, United States	Dusty Rhodes, Dustin Rhodes and The Nasty Boys (Brian Knobbs and Jerry Sags) defeated The Stud Stable (Terry Funk, Arn Anderson, Bunkhouse Buck and Col. Robert Parker) in a WarGames match
September 23	UWF	Blackjack Brawl	Las Vegas, Nevada, United States	Steve Williams (c) defeated Sid Vicious by disqualification in a Singles match for the UWF World Heavyweight Championship
September 30	CMLL	CMLL 61st Anniversary Show	Mexico City, Mexico	Ricky Santana defeated El Texano in a Best two-out-of-three falls Lucha de Apuestas, hair vs. hair match
(c) – denotes defending champion(s)

=== October ===
Date	Promotion(s)	Event	Location	Main Event
October 22	AJPW	22nd Anniversary Show	Tokyo, Japan	Toshiaki Kawada defeated "Dr. Death" Steve Williams (c) to win the Triple Crown Heavyweight Championship
October 23	WCW	Halloween Havoc	Detroit, Michigan, United States	Hulk Hogan (c) defeated Ric Flair in a Steel Cage Retirement match for the WCW World Heavyweight Championship with Mr. T as special guest referee
October 23	CMLL	Copa de Oro	Mexico City, Mexico	Apolo Dantes and El Dandy defeated Pierroth, Jr. and El Satanico in a tournament final
(c) – denotes defending champion(s)

=== November ===
Date	Promotion(s)	Event	Location	Main Event
November 5	ECW	November to Remember	Philadelphia, Pennsylvania, United States	Chris Benoit vs. 2 Cold Scorpio went to a double count-out in a Singles match
November 6	AAA; WCW; IWC	When Worlds Collide	Los Angeles, California, United States	Perro Aguayo defeated Konnan in a Steel Cage match
November 16	WCW	Clash of the Champions XXIX	Jacksonville, Florida, United States	Hulk Hogan, Sting and Dave Sullivan defeated The Three Faces of Fear (The Butcher, Avalanche and Kevin Sullivan) in a Six-man tag team match with Mr. T as special guest referee
November 20	AJW	Big Egg Wrestling Universe	Tokyo, Japan	Akira Hokuto defeated Aja Kong in a V*TOP Five Star Tournament final round match
November 23	WWF	Survivor Series	San Antonio, Texas, United States	The Undertaker defeated Yokozuna in a Casket match with Chuck Norris as special guest referee
(c) – denotes defending champion(s)

=== December ===
Date	Promotion(s)	Event	Location	Main Event
December 17	ECW	Holiday Hell	Philadelphia, Pennsylvania, United States	The Public Enemy (Johnny Grunge and Rocco Rock) (c) defeated Sabu and the Tazmaniac by pinfall in a tag team match for the ECW World Tag Team Championship
December 17	CWA	Euro Catch Festival in Bremen	Bremen, Germany	Rambo (c) defeated Big Titan in Round 5 in a Singles match for the CWA World Heavyweight Championship
December 27	WCW	Starrcade	Nashville, Tennessee, United States	Hulk Hogan (c) defeated The Butcher in a Singles match for the WCW World Heavyweight Championship
December 30	CMLL	Torneo Gran Alternativa	Mexico City, Mexico	Hector Garza and Negro Casas defeated Arkangel de la Muerte and El Satanico in a tournament final
(c) – denotes defending champion(s)

== Notable events ==
- January 27 – Bobby Heenan made his WCW debut at the Clash of the Champions XXVI.
- March 12 – WCW Power Hour aired its last episode on TBS and it was replaced by WCW Pro the following week.
- May 1 – Rick Rude suffers a career-ending injury during a match vs Sting for the WCW International World Heavyweight title in Fukuoka, Japan when he injured his back landing on a raised platform surrounding the ring.
- June 10 – Hulk Hogan made his WCW debut on WCW Saturday Night.
- July 17 – Hulk Hogan vs Ric Flair finally headlined a Pay-Per-View event at WCW Bash at the Beach (1994).
- July 22 – The jury acquitted WWF Owner Vince McMahon of the charges of distributing steroids to his wrestlers.
- August 4 – Eric Bischoff fires Jesse Ventura for allegedly falling asleep during a WCW Worldwide TV taping at Disney MGM Studios although it has been speculated that the move may have had more to do with Hogan's arrival shortly before.
- August 27 – Moments after winning the NWA World Heavyweight Championship Shane Douglas throws down the NWA title and christens the ECW Heavyweight Championship as a world title.
- August 28 – NWA Eastern Championship Wrestling officially secedes from the National Wrestling Alliance folding NWA Eastern Championship Wrestling and relaunching as Extreme Championship Wrestling.
- September 18 – Ricky Steamboat suffering from a back injury forfeited the WCW United States Heavyweight title to Steve Austin at WCW Fall Brawl (1994) which lost it to Hacksaw Jim Duggan in 35 seconds.
- September 23 The GWF based in Dallas, Texas closes its doors after three years in operation.
- October 16 – WWF All-American Wrestling aired its last episode on the USA Network. it was replaced by WWF Action Zone the following week.
- October 31 – Randy Savage made his final appearance on WWF TV on WWF Monday Night Raw saving Lex Luger from an attack from Bob Backlund.
- December 3 – After his WWF contract ended Randy Savage made his WCW TV debut on a live edition of WCW Saturday Night.

== Accomplishments and tournaments ==
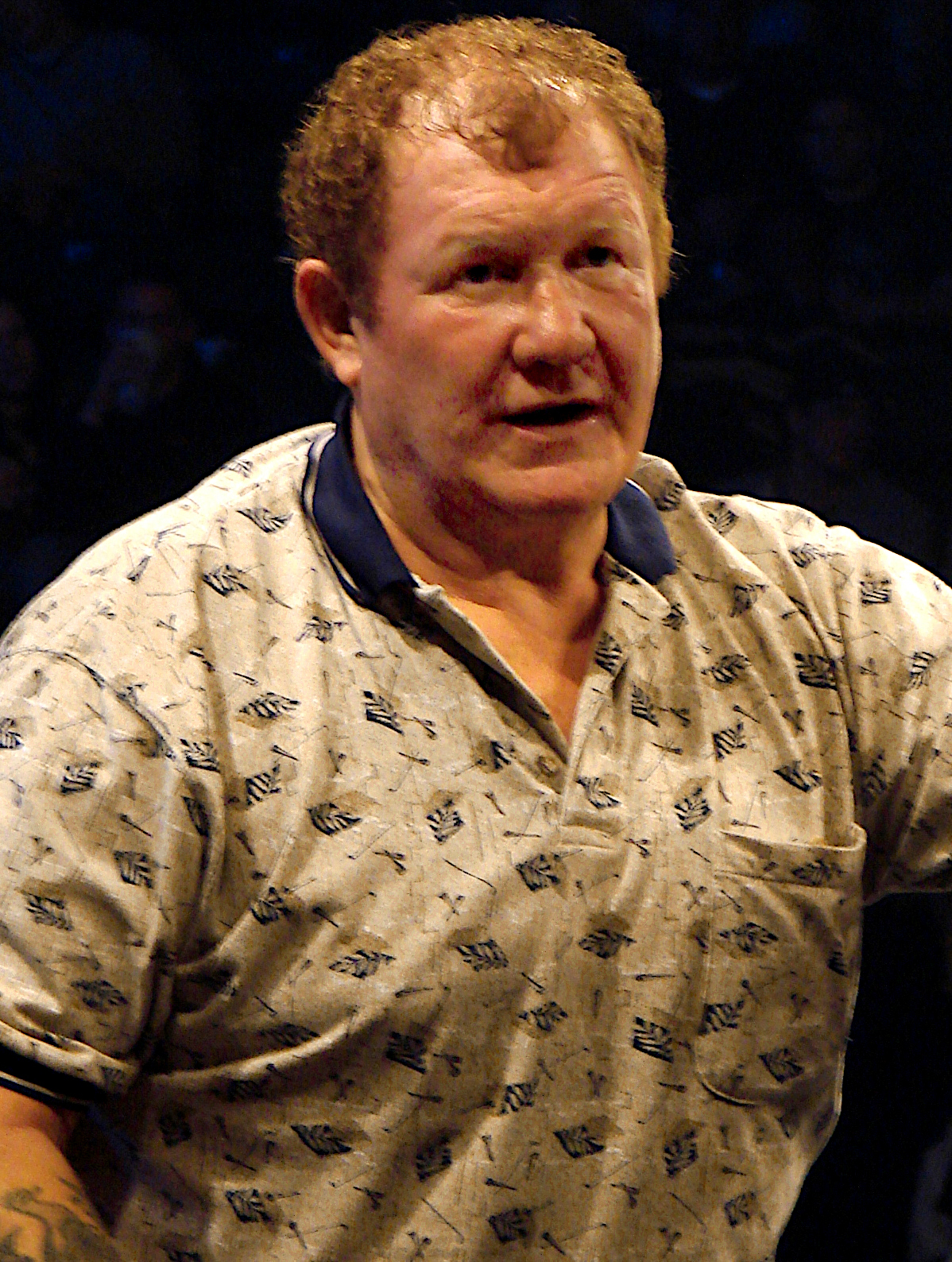
WCW Hall of Fame 1994 inductee, Harley Race

=== AJW ===
Accomplishment	Winner	Date won	Notes
Japan Grand Prix 1994	Yumiko Hotta	August 28	
Rookie of the Year Decision Tournament	Yoshiko Tamura		
Tag League The Best 1994	Kyoko Inoue and Manami Toyota	December 10	

=== AJPW ===
Accomplishment	Winner	Date won	Notes
Asunaro Cup 1994	Jun Akiyama	January 29	
Champion Carnival 1994	Toshiaki Kawada	April 16	
World's Strongest Determination League 1994	Kenta Kobashi and Mitsuharu Misawa	December 10	

=== ECW ===
Accomplishment	Winner	Date won	Notes
NWA World Title Tournament	Shane Douglas	August 27	

=== WCW ===
Accomplishment	Winner	Date won	Notes
European Cup Tournament	Sting	March 20	

==== WCW Hall of Fame ====
Inductee
Harley Race
Ernie Ladd
The Crusher
Dick the Bruiser
Ole Anderson
Masked Assassin

=== WWF ===
Accomplishment	Winner	Date won	Notes
Royal Rumble	Bret Hart; Lex Luger	January 22	
King of the Ring	Owen Hart	June 19	

==== WWF Hall of Fame ====
Category	Inductee	Inducted by
Individual	Arnold Skaaland	Shane McMahon
Individual	Bobo Brazil	Ernie Ladd
Individual	"Nature Boy" Buddy Rogers	Bret Hart
Individual	Chief Jay Strongbow	Gorilla Monsoon
Individual	"Classy" Freddie Blassie	Shane McMahon
Individual	Gorilla Monsoon	Jim Ross
Individual	James Dudley	Vince McMahon

==== Slammy Awards ====
Poll	Winner
Most Intimidating	The Undertaker
Best Entertainer	Oscar
Worst Idea	Abe Knuckleball Schwartz on strike
Sweatiest	Irwin R. Shyster
Biggest Rat	Owen Hart
Greediest	Tatanka
Most Spectacular Match	Ladder match: Razor Ramon vs Shawn Michaels at WrestleMania X
Best Coliseum Home Video	WWF Raw: Video Strategies & Secrets
Best Tag Team	Diesel & Shawn Michaels
Worst Tag Team	Diesel & Shawn Michaels
Mouthiest	Jerry The King Lawler
Most Eccentric	Bob Backlund
Smelliest	(TIE) Henry Godwinn / Duke The Dumpster Droese
Most Likely To See Jenny Craig	Bastion Booger
Best PPV	WrestleMania X
Best Manager	The Million Dollar Man Ted DiBiase
Best New Generation Spot	Bret The Hitman Hart "Go get 'em, champ!" commercial
Best Etiquette	The Headshrinkers
Most Devastating	Bull Nakano
Funniest	Dink The Clown
MVP	Diesel
Best Show	WWF Mania
Most Evolutionary	(TIE) Gorilla Monsoon / King Kong Bundy
Most Patriotic	Lex Luger
Best Dressed	James E. Cornette
Biggest Heart	The 123 Kid

== Awards and honors ==
=== Pro Wrestling Illustrated ===
Category	Winner
PWI Wrestler of the Year	Hulk Hogan
PWI Tag Team of the Year	The Nasty Boys (Brian Knobs and Jerry Sags)
PWI Match of the Year	Razor Ramon vs. Shawn Michaels (WrestleMania X)
PWI Feud of the Year	Bret Hart vs. Owen Hart
PWI Most Popular Wrestler of the Year	Sting
PWI Most Hated Wrestler of the Year	Bob Backlund
PWI Comeback of the Year	Hulk Hogan
PWI Most Improved Wrestler of the Year	Diesel
PWI Most Inspirational Wrestler of the Year	Bret Hart
PWI Rookie of the Year	911
PWI Lifetime Achievement	Captain Lou Albano
PWI Editor's Award	Jimmy Hart

=== Wrestling Observer Newsletter ===
Category	Winner
Wrestler of the Year	Toshiaki Kawada
Most Outstanding	Kenta Kobashi
Feud of the Year	Los Gringos Locos vs. Asistencia Asesoría y Administración
Tag Team of the Year	Los Gringos Locos (Eddy Guerrero and Art Barr)
Most Improved	Diesel
Best on Interviews	Ric Flair

== Title changes ==
=== ECW ===
ECW World Heavyweight Championship
Incoming champion – Terry Funk
Date	Winner	Event/Show	Note(s)
March 26	Shane Douglas	Ultimate Jeopardy (1994)	

ECW World Television Championship
Incoming champion – Sabu
Date	Winner	Event/Show	Note(s)
March 6	The Tazmaniac	Hardcore TV #48	
March 6	J.T. Smith	Hardcore TV #49	
April 16	Gary Wolfe	Live event	
May 13	Mikey Whipwreck	Hardcore TV #57	
August 13	Jason	Hardcore Heaven	
November 4	2 Cold Scorpio	Hardcore TV #83	
November 4	Dean Malenko	Hardcore TV #84	

ECW World Tag Team Championship
Incoming champions – Kevin Sullivan and The Tazzmaniac
Date	Winner	Event/Show	Note(s)
February 5	Vacant	N/A	
March 5	Kevin Sullivan and The Tazzmaniac	N/A	
March 6	The Public Enemy (Johnny Grunge and Rocco Rock)	Hardcore TV #47	
August 27	Cactus Jack and Mikey Whipwreck	Hardcore TV #73	
November 5	The Public Enemy (Johnny Grunge and Rocco Rock)	November to Remember	

ECW Maryland Championship
Incoming champion – J.T. Smith
Date	Winner	Event/Show	Note(s)
March 6	Deactivated	N/A	Title abandoned when J.T. Smith won the ECW World Television Championship.

=== FMW ===
FMW Brass Knuckles Heavyweight Championship
Incoming champion – Atsushi Onita
Date	Winner	Event/Show	Note(s)
January 6	Mr. Pogo	FMW	
September 7	Atsushi Onita	FMW	

FMW Brass Knuckles Tag Team Championship
(Title reactivated)
Date	Winner	Event/Show	Note(s)
January 18	Big Titan and The Gladiator	FMW	
April 21	Mr. Pogo and Hisakatsu Oya	FMW	
July 31	Atsushi Onita and Mitsuhiro Matsunaga	FMW	
October	Vacant	FMW	
October 28	W*ING Alliance (Mr. Pogo and The Gladiator)	FMW	

FMW Independent World Junior Heavyweight Championship
Incoming champion – The Great Sasuke
Date	Winner	Event/Show	Note(s)
December 20	Ricky Fuji	House show	

FMW Women's Championship
Incoming champion – Crusher Maedomari
Date	Winner	Event/Show	Note(s)
February 11	Vacant	FMW	
February 25	Megumi Kudo	FMW	
June 19	Combat Toyoda	FMW	
August 28	Yukie Nabeno	Summer Spectacular	
December 12	Vacant	N/A	

=== NJPW ===
IWGP Heavyweight Championship
Incoming champion – Shinya Hashimoto
Date	Winner	Event/Show	Note(s)
April 4	Tatsumi Fujinami	Battle Line Kyushi	
May 1	Shinya Hashimoto	Wrestling Dontaku 1994	

IWGP Tag Team Championship
Incoming champions – The Jurassic Powers (Hercules Hernandez and Scott Norton)
Date	Winner	Event/Show	Note(s)
January 4	The Hell Raisers (Hawk Warrior and Power Warrior)	Battlefield	
November 25	Hiroshi Hase and Keiji Mutoh	Battle Final 1994	

IWGP Junior Heavyweight Championship
Incoming champion – Jushin Thunder Liger
Date	Winner	Event/Show	Note(s)
September 24	Vacant	N/A	
September 27	Norio Honaga	G1 Climax Special 1994	

=== WCW ===
WCW World Heavyweight Championship
Incoming champion – Ric Flair
Date	Winner	Event/Show	Note(s)
April 17	Vacant	Spring Stampede	A title match between Ric Flair and Ricky Steamboat ended in a double pin, which resulted in the title being vacated
April 21	Ric Flair	Saturday Night	Aired on tape delay on May 14.
July 17	Hulk Hogan	Bash at the Beach	

WCW International World Heavyweight Championship
Incoming champion – Rick Rude
Date	Winner	Event/Show	Note(s)
March 16	Hiroshi Hase	House show	
March 24	Rick Rude	House show	
April 17	Sting	Spring Stampede	
May 1	Rick Rude	Wrestling Dontaku	
May 1	Vacant	N/A	Rude's victory is reversed due to use of the belt as a weapon. Sting refuses the title, leaving it vacant
May 22	Sting	Slamboree	Defeated Vader to win the vacant title.
June 23	Ric Flair	Clash of the Champions XXVII	Title ceases to exist after winning

WCW United States Heavyweight Championship
Incoming champion – Steve Austin
Date	Winner	Event/Show	Note(s)
August 24	Ricky Steamboat	Clash of the Champions XXVIII	
September 18	Steve Austin	Fall Brawl	
September 18	Jim Duggan	Fall Brawl	
December 27	Vader	Starrcade	

WCW World Television Championship
Incoming champion – Lord Steven Regal
Date	Winner	Event/Show	Note(s)
May 2	Larry Zbyszko	Saturday Night	Aired on tape delay on May 28.
June 23	Lord Steven Regal	Clash of the Champions XXVII	
September 18	Johnny B. Badd	Fall Brawl	

WCW World Tag Team Championship
Incoming champions – The Nasty Boys (Brian Knobbs and Jerry Sags)
Date	Winner	Event/Show	Note(s)
May 22	Cactus Jack and Kevin Sullivan	Slamboree	
July 17	Pretty Wonderful (Paul Roma and Paul Orndorff)	Bash at the Beach	
September 25	Stars and Stripes (Marcus Alexander Bagwell and The Patriot)	Main Event	
October 23	Pretty Wonderful (Paul Roma and Paul Orndorff)	Halloween Havoc	
November 16	Stars and Stripes (Marcus Alexander Bagwell and The Patriot)	Clash of the Champions XXIX	
December 8	Harlem Heat (Booker T and Stevie Ray)	Saturday Night	Aired on tape delay on January 14.

=== WWF ===
WWF World Heavyweight Championship
Incoming champion – Yokozuna
Date	Winner	Event/Show	Note(s)
March 20	Bret Hart	WrestleMania X	Roddy Piper was the guest referee
November 23	Bob Backlund	Survivor Series	It was a submission match.
November 26	Diesel	House show	this title change occurred in New York City's Madison Square Garden. The time of the fall: 8 seconds

WWF Intercontinental Championship
Incoming champion – Razor Ramon
Date	Winner	Event/Show	Note(s)
April 13	Diesel	Superstars	This was aired on tape delay on April 30.
August 29	Razor Ramon	SummerSlam	

WWF Women's Championship
Incoming champion – Alundra Blayze
Date	Winner	Event/Show	Note(s)
November 20	Bull Nakano	Big Egg Wrestling Universe	

WWF Tag Team Championship
Incoming champions – The Quebecers (Pierre and Jacques)
Date	Winner	Event/Show	Note(s)
January 10	The 1-2-3 Kid and Marty Jannetty	Raw	
January 17	The Quebecers (Pierre and Jacques)	House show	
March 29	Men on a Mission (Mabel and Mo)	House show	
March 31	The Quebecers (Pierre and Jacques)	House show	
April 26	The Headshrinkers (Fatu and Samu)	Raw	
August 28	Two Dudes with Attitudes (Diesel and Shawn Michaels)	House show	
November 23	Vacant	Survivor Series	Vacated when Diesel and Michaels could not function as a tag team

== Births ==
- January 25 – Zoey Stark
- February 21 – Giulia
- March 10
  - Bad Bunny
  - JoJo Offerman
- March 25 – Principe Aéreo (died in 2020)
- March 26 – Paige VanZant
- April 14 – Tian Bing
- April 29 – Nash Carter
- May 26 - Trick Williams
- May 27 – Nao Ishikawa
- June 6 – Masato Kamino
- June 8 – Liv Morgan
- June 10 – Deonna Purrazzo
- June 16 – Rezar
- June 23 – Kanji
- June 30 - Von Wagner
- July 6 - Kali Armstrong
- July 19 – Kotaro Yoshino
- July 28 – Ahura
- August 4 - Kit Wilson
- August 12 – Jeniver Bryan Adam
- August 26 - Austin Gunn
- September 25 –
  - Janai Kai
  - Fallon Henley
- October 3 - Julius Creed
- October 26 – Chika Goto
- November 8 – Chiaki
- November 11 – Lio Rush
- November 15 – Tegan Nox
- November 17 – Lady C
- November 18 – Yuya Uemura
- November 23 – Aliyah
- December 22 – Calvin Tankman

== Debuts ==
- Uncertain debut date
  - Mikey Whipwreck
  - D'Lo Brown
  - Viktor Kruger
  - Survival Tobita
  - Yoko Takahashi (All Japan Women's)
- January 9 - Hiromi Yagi
- January 11 - Tessy Sugo
- January 21 - Masaaki Mochizuki
- January 24 - Minoru Tanaka
- February 24 - Tadao Yasuda
- May 23 - Jeff Hardy
- June 14 - Takashi Okamura
- July 7 – Exciting Yoshida
- August 28 – Misae Genki
- August 30 - Starman
- August 31 - Saya Endo (All Japan Women's)
- September 11 – Billy Kidman
- September 15 - Yoshiko Tamura
- September 23 - Diablo
- October 7 – Tanny Mouse
- October 9 - Crusher Takahashi
- October 25 - Ryuji Yamakawa and Yuichi Taniguchi
- October 31 - Takeshi Ono (PWFG)
- November 3 - The Bloody (All Japan Women's and Jd' Star)
- November 10 – Daikokubō Benkei
- December 3 - Big Show
- December 4 – Azumi Hyuga, Carlos Amano and Ran Yu-Yu

== Retirements ==
- Jesse Ventura (1974–1994)
- Curly Moe (1990–1994)
- Ted DiBiase (1975–1994)
- Afa Anoaʻi (1971–1994)
- Ashura Hara (1978–1994)
- Moondog Spike (1978–1994)
- Don Jardine (1955–1994)
- The Great Wojo (1984–1994)
- Jose Luis Rivera (1970–1994)
- Ivan Koloff (1961–1994)
- Jack Armstrong (wrestler) (1963–1994)
- Magnificent Mimi (1980–1994)
- Jimmy Garvin (1968–1994)
- Mae Weston (1938–June 17, 1994)
- Mr. T (March 24, 1985 – December 27, 1994)
- Ricky Steamboat (1976–September 1994) (Returned to wrestle in 2009 with WWE and last wrestled in 2010)
- Salman Hashimikov (1989–1994)
- Steve Ray (wrestler) (1987–1994)
- Thunderbolt Patterson (1964–1994)
- Tommy Jammer (1989–1994)
- Troy Graham (September 1976 – 1994)
- Joe Cruz (wrestler) (1985–1994)

== Deaths ==
- January 19 - Johnny Kwango, 73
- February 25 Jersey Joe Walcott, 80
- March 4:
  - Aníbal, 53
  - Ronnie Etchison, 73
- March 9 - Eddie Creatchman, 66
- May 23 – Ray Candy, 42
- June 26 - Bobby Bonales, 77
- July 1 – George Cannon, 62
- July 4 – Joey Marella, 31
- July 25 - Scott Peterson, 31
- August 15 - John Bonica, 77
- September 1 – Boris Malenko, 61
- October 27 - Kay Bell, 80
- November 23 – Art Barr, 28
- December 31 - Woody Strode, 80

== See also ==
- List of WCW pay-per-view events
- List of WWF pay-per-view events
- List of ECW supercards and pay-per-view events
- List of FMW supercards and pay-per-view events
