= November to Remember (1994) =

1994 Extreme Championship Wrestling supercard event

- Promotion: Extreme Championship Wrestling
- Date: November 5, 1994
- City: Philadelphia, Pennsylvania
- Venue: ECW Arena
- Attendance: 1,000

Event chronology
← Previous; NWA World Title Tournament	Next → Holiday Hell

November to Remember chronology
← Previous; 1993	Next → 1995

November to Remember (1994) was the second November to Remember professional wrestling live event produced by Extreme Championship Wrestling (ECW) that took place on November 5, 1994, in the ECW Arena in Philadelphia, Pennsylvania.

Nine professional wrestling matches were contested at the event. The event featured two main event matches. In the first main event, Shane Douglas defended the ECW World Heavyweight Championship against Ron Simmons. The second main event was a singles match, in which Chris Benoit took on Sabu. During the match, Sabu suffered a spinal cord injury, which resulted in the match ending in a no contest. Benoit was then challenged by 2 Cold Scorpio to an impromptu match, which ended in a double count-out.

Although not airing on pay-per-view, in July 2019 the event was added to the WWE Network, in the ECW pay-per-view section.

Chris Benoit versus Sabu was included on the 2004 WWE DVD release Hard Knocks: The Chris Benoit Story.

== Storylines ==
The event featured wrestlers from pre-existing scripted feuds and storylines. Wrestlers portrayed villains, heroes, or less distinguishable characters in the scripted events that built tension and culminated in a wrestling match or series of matches played out on ECW's television program Hardcore TV.

At the NWA World Title Tournament, Shane Douglas disgraced National Wrestling Alliance by throwing down the NWA World Heavyweight Championship after winning it in a tournament and then Tod Gordon announced that ECW was withdrawing from the NWA and renaming to "Extreme Championship Wrestling" and recognized Douglas as the ECW World Heavyweight Champion. On October 15, Ron Simmons attacked Douglas after Douglas had retained the title against The Tazmaniac, with the help of Mr. Hughes. On the October 25 episode of Hardcore TV, it was announced that Douglas would defend the title against Simmons at November to Remember.

At NWA World Title Tournament, Cactus Jack and Mikey Whipwreck defeated The Public Enemy (Rocco Rock and Johnny Grunge) to win the ECW World Tag Team Championship. On the September 20 episode of Hardcore TV, Public Enemy attacked Jack and Whipwreck during a tag team match, which resulted in a brawl between the two teams. On the October 11 episode of Hardcore TV, Whipwreck received a title shot against Jason for the World Television Championship, during which Public Enemy interfered and helped Jason in retaining the title against Whipwreck and continued to attack him after the match until Jack made the save. The following week, on Hardcore TV, it was announced that Jack and Whipwreck would defend the World Tag Team Championship against Public Enemy in a Brawl Game match at November to Remember.

Tommy Dreamer and The Sandman had been feuding with each other since the July 19 episode of Hardcore TV, when Dreamer tried to stop Sandman from caning Mikey Whipwreck and Tommy Cairo and then Dreamer kissed Woman after avoiding her caning attempt and then Sandman lashed him with the cane fifty-seven times, which would weaken Dreamer enough to fail in his World Heavyweight Championship title shot against Shane Douglas. At Hardcore Heaven, Sandman defeated Dreamer in a Singapore Cane match. The two met in another Singapore Cane rematch on the August 30 Hardcore TV, where Sandman emerged victorious once again, thanks to interference by Woman and the match stipulated that the loser would be hit with the cane ten times and Dreamer agreed to receive the punishment. On the October 4 Hardcore TV, Dreamer defeated Sandman in an "I Quit" match, during which Sandman was apparently blinded after a cigarette was lit in his eyes. Dreamer expressed remorse for his actions, while Tommy Cairo appreciated Dreamer's actions and proclaimed that Sandman deserved to suffer the same fate due to Sandman having beaten Cairo in a Dueling Canes match at Heat Wave. On the October 18 episode of Hardcore TV, Sandman announced that he would retire in the near future due to the injury and give a retirement speech at November to Remember. On the October 25 episode of Hardcore TV, it was announced that Dreamer would face Cairo in a match at November to Remember. Later that night, Cairo was disqualified against Mikey Whipwreck for hitting him with a Singapore cane until Dreamer made the rescue.

On the September 13 episode of Hardcore TV, the World Television Champion Jason added Dean Malenko into his group as his insurance policy and Malenko would manage Jason during matches at ringside and help him in retaining the World Television Championship. On the September 27 episode of Hardcore TV, Malenko assisted Jason to victory against Dino Sendoff and continued to attack Sendoff after the match until The Tazmaniac made the save and brawled with Malenko. The two brawled with each other again on the following week's Hardcore TV. On the October 18 episode of Hardcore TV, it was announced that Malenko would compete against Tazmaniac at November to Remember.

On the September 20 episode of Hardcore TV, it was announced the Sabu would face Chris Benoit in a match at a live event on October 1, which Benoit won by count-out. On the October 18 episode of Hardcore TV, it was announced that Sabu would face Benoit in a rematch at November to Remember.

== Event ==
=== Preliminary matches ===
In the opening match, J.T. Smith defeated Hack Meyers, followed by The Pitbulls (Pitbull #1 and Pitbull #2) getting a win over The Bad Breed (Axl Rotten and Ian Rotten) in a tag team match.

Next, 2 Cold Scorpio took on Mr. Hughes. Hughes overpowered Scorpio by using his strength advantage and executing power moves. Hughes continued to control Scorpio throughout the match until he missed a charge at Scorpio in the corner and got knocked out, allowing Scorpio to execute a Scorpio Splash for the win.

Tommy Dreamer took on Tommy Cairo. Dreamer immediately attacked Cairo until Cairo countered with a spin kick which sent Dreamer outside the ring. Cairo hit him another spin kick until Dreamer grabbed a steel chair and hit Cairo with it on numerous occasions and then suplexed him on the floor. The action returned to the ring where both men used several weapons against each other. Near the end of the match, Cairo got a Singapore cane and attempted to strike Dreamer with it but he countered it and then Dreamer began hitting Cairo with the cane. He launched several cane shots on Cairo, which made him bleed and the referee stopped the match, awarding the victory to Dreamer. The match was followed by a retirement ceremony for The Sandman, who had seemingly been blinded in an "I Quit" match with Dreamer. During the ceremony, The Sandman's ex-wife, Peaches, attempted to reconcile with him, only to be interrupted by Woman, The Sandman's former manager, who had labelled him "useless" and abandoned him upon his blinding. Woman interrupted the reconciliation, caning Peaches and threatening The Sandman. After Dreamer came to the ring to protect Sandman, The Sandman revealed that he was not in fact blinded and attacked Dreamer, with his estrangement from Woman revealed as a ruse to ensnare Dreamer in order to gain revenge on Cairo.

Next, The Tazmaniac took on Dean Malenko. Tazmaniac took down Malenko with a single leg takedown and then attempted to whip Malenko but Malenko countered and applied a butterfly hold on his opponent. Tazmaniac broke out of it with a Northern Lights suplex. Malenko then nailed Tazmaniac with a double underhook powerbomb and then tried a roll-up but Tazmaniac countered by dropping him throat first on the rope and hit a German suplex. He then attempted a half nelson suplex from the top rope but Malenko countered out of it. Jason interfered by attacking Tazmaniac, who went outside the ring to attack him, allowing Malenko to grab a towel and pour something in it. Tazmaniac returned to the ring where Malenko shove the towel into Tazmaniac to knock him out for the victory.

Later, Shane Douglas defended the World Heavyweight Championship against Ron Simmons. Simmons attacked Douglas as the match began until Douglas knocked him down with a dropkick. He began rolling out of the ring which angered Simmons, who chased Douglas at the ringside and ultimately got control by countering a diving crossbody attempt by Douglas into a Powerslam. He followed with a gutbuster and then attempted a diving headbutt on Douglas but missed it. Simmons continued the momentum with a Chokeslam and charged at him with a running clothesline but Douglas countered and pinned him with a crucifix to retain the title. After the match, Douglas attacked Simmons with the championship belt until 2 Cold Scorpio made the save and then Simmons attacked Douglas with the title and Scorpio nailed a Moonsault on Douglas.

The penultimate match was a Brawl Game match, in which Cactus Jack and Mikey Whipwreck defended the World Tag Team Championship against The Public Enemy (Rocco Rock and Johnny Grunge). The match stipulated that the opponent must be knocked down for a ten count, allowing the team to use a baseball bat as a legal weapon. Public Enemy got the chance to use baseball bat as a weapon after Rocco ducked a punch by Whipwreck and pushed him into Jack, who mistakenly hit Whipwreck with a double arm DDT and Whipwreck was knocked down for the ten count. Public Enemy began hitting the champions with the bats and Rocco attempted to drive Whipwreck through a table from the top of a nest until Sabu showed up to confront him and pushed him through the table. The match continued until Rocco drove Cactus through the table with a diving elbow drop. Grunge then dove from the top rope and nailed a baseball bat on Whipwreck's face to win the titles.

=== Main event match ===
The main event between Chris Benoit and Sabu ended quickly when Benoit botched a back body drop which sent Sabu over the top rope and legitimately injured his spinal cord resulting in nerve damage. Immediately after the match, Benoit demanded a real fight with 2 Cold Scorpio coming out as he challenged Benoit to a match. During the match, Public Enemy tried to interfere but Scorpio chased them away. The action spilled to the ringside, where Benoit drove Scorpio through a table into the guardrail, which resulted in the match ending in a double count-out.

== Aftermath ==
A few matches from November to Remember were aired on the November 8 and November 15 episodes of Hardcore TV.

Shane Douglas continued his feud with Ron Simmons, with Douglas cutting a promo later on the show that on November 19 at ECW Arena, accompanied by the returning Sherri Martel, he would be partnering with "Stunning" Steve Austin to face the team of Simmons & Scorpio. It was announced on the November 29 episode of Hardcore TV that Douglas would defend the title against Simmons in a rematch at Holiday Hell. Simmons pinned Douglas in a tag team match on the December 6 episode of Hardcore TV. Douglas retained the title against Simmons at Holiday Hell.

The Tazmaniac continued his feud with Dean Malenko. On the November 22 episode of Hardcore TV, Tazmaniac teamed with Sabu to take on Dean and his brother Joe Malenko in a tag team match, which Sabu and Tazmaniac won. After the match, they were assaulted by the World Tag Team Champions Public Enemy, who proceeded to further injure Sabu's neck by hitting a Drive-By to Sabu through the table. This would lead to a match between the two teams for the World Tag Team Championship at Holiday Hell, where Public Enemy retained the title.

The feud between Tommy Dreamer, Tommy Cairo and The Sandman continued after November to Remember. On the December 13 episode of Hardcore TV, Dreamer and Peaches defeated Cairo and Angel in a mixed tag team match. After the match, Sandman rushed in the ring to attack Dreamer and then Cairo ended his hatred with The Sandman by joining forces with him in assaulting Dreamer until Cactus Jack made the save for Dreamer. This culminated in a tag team match, in which Dreamer and Jack defeated Sandman and Cairo at Holiday Hell.

The Pitbulls and Bad Breed continued their rivalry after November to Remember as the two teams competed in a Double Dog Collar match on November 19, which Pitbulls won. On the January 17 episode of Hardcore TV, Pitbulls defeated Bad Breed in a match which stipulated that the losing team must break up, which resulted in Bad Breed being forced to disband. After the loss, Ian Rotten turned on Axl Rotten by attacking him with a chair and the two former tag team partners engaged in a feud with each other culminating in a series of matches between the two which ended in a Taipei Deathmatch at Hardcore Heaven.

Due to crippling Sabu at November to Remember, Chris Benoit subsequently adopted the nickname "The Crippler".

It has been said that when Sabu was in the hospital he refused to speak in order to protect kayfabe as part of his character was he didn't speak. Paul Heyman had to act as a translator. This lasted for hours until Sabu was eventually forced to talk in order to save his life.

== Results ==
No.	Results	Stipulations	Times
1	J.T. Smith defeated Hack Meyers	Singles match	4:02
2	The Pitbulls (Pitbull #1 and Pitbull #2) defeated The Bad Breed (Axl Rotten and Ian Rotten)	Tag team match	3:11
3	2 Cold Scorpio defeated Mr. Hughes	Singles match	7:09
4	Tommy Dreamer defeated Tommy Cairo via referee stoppage	Singles match	7:09
5	Dean Malenko (with Jason) defeated The Tazmaniac via knockout	Singles match	5:13
6	Shane Douglas (c) defeated Ron Simmons	Singles match for the ECW World Heavyweight Championship	6:34
7	The Public Enemy (Rocco Rock and Johnny Grunge) defeated Cactus Jack and Mikey Whipwreck (c)	Brawl Game match for the ECW World Tag Team Championship	12:34
8	Chris Benoit vs. Sabu (with 911 and Paul E. Dangerously) ended in a no-contest	Singles match	2:00
9	Chris Benoit (with The Public Enemy) vs. 2 Cold Scorpio ended in a double count-out	Singles match	12:00
(c) / – the champion(s) heading into the match

== See also ==
- 1994 in professional wrestling
