= Hardcore Heaven (1994) =

1994 Eastern Championship Wrestling supercard event

- The ECW Arena
- Promotion: Eastern Championship Wrestling
- Date: August 13, 1994 (aired August 16 and 23, 1994)
- City: Philadelphia, Pennsylvania, United States
- Venue: ECW Arena
- Attendance: 1,000

Event chronology
← Previous; Heat Wave	Next → NWA World Title Tournament

Hardcore Heaven chronology
← Previous; First	Next → 1995

Hardcore Heaven (1994) was the first Hardcore Heaven event. It was promoted by Eastern Championship Wrestling (ECW) on August 13, 1994 in the ECW Arena in Philadelphia, Pennsylvania in the United States.

Nine professional wrestling matches were contested at the event. In the main event, Terry Funk fought Cactus Jack to a no contest after The Public Enemy interfered and attacked both men. The show had a notable ending, which saw the audience throw dozens of folding chairs into the ring, burying Public Enemy.

Excerpts from Hardcore Heaven aired on episode #70 and #71 of ECW Hardcore TV on August 16 and 23, 1994. In July 2019, the event was made available for streaming on the WWE Network. The bout between Cactus Jack and Terry Funk was included on the 2013 WWE DVD and Blu-ray release ECW Unreleased: Vol 2.

== Storylines ==
The event featured wrestlers from pre-existing scripted feuds and storylines. Wrestlers portrayed villains, heroes, or less distinguishable characters in the scripted events that built tension and culminated in a wrestling match or series of matches played out on ECW's television program Hardcore TV.

At Heat Wave, 911 and Mr. Hughes had multiple confrontations with each other as Hughes attacked him with a steel chair during a match between The Tazmaniac and The Pitbulls (Pitbull #1 and Pitbull #2). Later that night, 911 retaliated by chokeslamming Hughes, Shane Douglas and Angel after Douglas' title defense of the ECW Heavyweight Championship against Sabu. On the July 26 episode of Hardcore TV, it was announced that 911 would face Hughes at Hardcore Heaven.

On the July 12 episode of Hardcore TV, The Tazmaniac defeated Jimmy Snuka and Snuka was about to attack his manager Hunter Q. Robbins III after the match in anger. At Heat Wave, Tazmaniac and Sabu defeated The Pitbulls in a quick match. On the July 26 episode of Hardcore TV, Tommy Dreamer, Terry Funk and Dory Funk, Jr. defeated the team of Snuka and The Pitbulls in a six-man tag team match. After the match, Robbins berated Snuka resulting in Snuka attacking Robbins and then The Pitbulls attacked Snuka which led to Tazmaniac coming out to make the rescue and Snuka officially turning face. On the August 2 episode of Hardcore TV, a match was made between The Pitbulls and the team of Snuka and Tazmaniac at Hardcore Heaven.

At Heat Wave, The Bad Breed (Axl Rotten and Ian Rotten) defeated Hack Meyers and Rockin' Rebel in a tag team match when Ian pinned Meyers. After the match, an irate Rebel clotheslined Meyers. On the July 26 episode of Hardcore TV, Rebel teamed with Jason and Chad Austin to defeat the team of Meyers, Don E. Allen and Dino Sendoff. After the match, it was announced that Meyers and Rebel would compete in a match against each other at Hardcore Heaven.

At Heat Wave, The Public Enemy (Rocco Rock and Johnny Grunge) defeated Terry Funk and Dory Funk, Jr. in a Barbed wire match. Public Enemy then entered a feud with Bad Breed as the two teams clashed on several house shows. On the August 9 episode of Hardcore TV, it was announced that Public Enemy would defend the titles against Bad Breed in a Baseball Brawl match at Hardcore Heaven.

At Heat Wave, Mikey Whipwreck defeated Chad Austin by disqualification to retain the ECW Television Championship. On the July 26 episode of Hardcore TV, it was announced that Whipwreck would defend the title against Jason in a no disqualification match at Hardcore Heaven. The following week on Hardcore TV, Jason interrupted Whipwreck's title defense against Stevie Richards by attacking Whipwreck, thus getting Richards disqualified.

On the July 26 episode of Hardcore TV, a match was made between Sabu and 2 Cold Scorpio at Hardcore Heaven. The following week on Hardcore TV, another match was added to the Hardcore Heaven card pitting Terry Funk against Cactus Jack.

At Heat Wave, The Sandman defeated Tommy Cairo in a Singapore Cane match. On the July 19 episode of Hardcore TV, Sandman received a title shot against Mikey Whipwreck for the Television Championship, during which Sandman's valet Woman caned Whipwreck, causing Sandman to get disqualified. Sandman continued to cane Whipwreck until Cairo and several wrestlers attempted to make the save but failed and then Tommy Dreamer succeeded in making the rescue. Woman tried to cane him but Dreamer avoided it and kissed her, which angered Sandman and he lashed Dreamer with the cane fifty-seven times, which weakened him enough to lose in his Heavyweight Championship title shot against Shane Douglas later in the night. A week later, on Hardcore TV, it was announced that Sandman would face Dreamer in a Singapore Cane match at Hardcore Heaven.

== Event ==
In the opening bout, Hack Meyers took on Rockin' Rebel. Meyers reversed Rebel's attempt at a belly-to-back suplex into a pinfall for the win.

In the second bout, Tommy Cairo took on Chad Austin. Austin pinned Cairo with a roll-up by holding the ropes for leverage.

In the third bout, Mikey Whipwreck defended the ECW Television Championship against Jason in a no disqualification match. Whipwreck accidentally knocked out the referee with a steel chair and then hit Jason with the chair and covered him for the pinfall. The referee attempted to count the three but passed out and then The Pitbulls (Pitbull #1 and Pitbull #2) attacked Whipwreck and put Jason on top of him for the pinfall victory, resulting in Jason winning the Television Championship.

In the fourth bout, the Tazmaniac and Jimmy Snuka faced The Pitbulls. Snuka performed a Superfly Splash on Pitbull #1 to quickly win the match in just forty seconds.

In the fifth bout, 911 took on Mr. Hughes. 911 blocked Hughes' attempt at a spinning side slam and hit a chokeslam for the win. After the match, Shane Douglas attacked 911's manager Paul E. Dangerously and then ran away and pushed Angel in 911's way and 911 delivered two chokeslams to Angel.

In the sixth bout, Tommy Dreamer took on The Sandman in a Singapore Cane match. Dreamer was hiding underneath the ring and attacked Sandman from behind and then hit the referee with a Singapore cane and Sandman as well, resulting in the referee disqualifying Dreamer.

In the seventh bout, the Public Enemy (Rocco Rock and Johnny Grunge) defended the ECW Tag Team Championship against the Bad Breed (Axl Rotten and Ian Rotten) in a Baseball Brawl match, which stipulated that if a team was knocked out for ten seconds then the other team would be able to use a baseball bat. Bad Breed were able to knock out Rock by using an electric chair, flying attack combination and then were eligible to use the baseball bat. The two teams continued to brawl at the ringside. Public Enemy ultimately executed a Drive-By on Axl to retain the titles.

In the eighth bout, Sabu took on 2 Cold Scorpio. Sabu performed an Arabian Facebuster on Scorpio for the win.

In the main event of the evening, Terry Funk took on Cactus Jack. Public Enemy interfered in the match by attacking Jack, resulting in the match being ruled out a no contest. Public Enemy then proceeded to attack Jack until Jack and Funk recovered and attacked Public Enemy. During the post-match fight, Funk called for a fan to toss him a steel chair. This set off a wild scene as several fans obliged Funk. More and more fans eventually got involved, and the ring began filling with chairs. Jack and Funk abruptly left the ring while Rocco Rock and Johnny Grunge stayed down on the mat so as not to be struck by any of the steel chairs now being used as projectiles. The chaos resulted in Public Enemy being trapped under a massive pile of steel chairs, and the situation got so out of hand that Joey Styles had to leave his broadcast position and take the public address microphone in order to get the fans to stop throwing chairs.

== Aftermath ==
Public Enemy's attack on Terry Funk at Hardcore Heaven was a continuation of their feud since Heat Wave. Their interference in Funk and Cactus Jack's main event at Hardcore Heaven resulted in Funk and Jack forming an alliance and beginning a feud with Public Enemy. On the August 16 episode of Hardcore TV, a match was made between Public Enemy and the team of Funk and Jack for the ECW Tag Team Championship at NWA World Title Tournament. Funk did not appear at the event and Mikey Whipwreck substituted for him as he and Jack beat Public Enemy for the tag team titles.

The Sandman and Tommy Dreamer continued their feud as the two battled in a Singapore Cane rematch on the August 30 episode of Hardcore TV, which Sandman won with the help of Woman. After the match, Dreamer gladly took the ten lashes of cane from Sandman. The feud continued as Dreamer defeated Sandman in an "I Quit" match on the October 4 episode of Hardcore TV after Sandman was blinded when a cigarette was lit in his eyes.

== Results ==
No.	Results	Stipulations	Times
1	Hack Meyers defeated Rockin' Rebel by pinfall	Singles match	04:40
2	Chad Austin defeated Tommy Cairo by pinfall	Singles match	04:30
3	Jason defeated Mikey Whipwreck (c) by pinfall	No disqualification match for the ECW Television Championship	12:09
4	The Tazmaniac and Jimmy Snuka defeated the Pitbulls (Pitbull #1 and Pitbull #2) by pinfall	Tag team match	00:40
5	911 (with Paul E. Dangerously) defeated Mr. Hughes (with Shane Douglas and Angel) by pinfall	Singles match	03:33
6	The Sandman (with Woman) defeated Tommy Dreamer by disqualification	Singapore Cane match	00:53
7	The Public Enemy (Rocco Rock and Johnny Grunge) (c) defeated the Bad Breed (Axl Rotten and Ian Rotten) by pinfall	Baseball Brawl match for the ECW Tag Team Championship	19:09
8	Sabu (with 911 and Paul E. Dangerously) defeated 2 Cold Scorpio by pinfall	Singles match	18:28
9	Cactus Jack vs. Terry Funk ended in a no-contest	Singles match	11:00
(c) / – the champion(s) heading into the match

== See also ==
- 1994 in professional wrestling
