= Holiday Hell =

Extreme Championship Wrestling supercard event series

- Promotions: Eastern Championship Wrestling / Extreme Championship Wrestling
- First event: Holiday Hell (1993)
- Last event: Holiday Hell (2000)

In professional wrestling, Holiday Hell was a supercard produced by the promotion Eastern Championship Wrestling/Extreme Championship Wrestling (ECW), based in Philadelphia, Pennsylvania, United States. Themed around the Christmas and holiday season, it was staged in December from 1993 to 1996, and again in 2000.

== 1993 ==
Holiday Hell (1993)
- The ECW Arena.
- Promotion: Eastern Championship Wrestling
- Date: December 26, 1993 (aired December 28, 1993)
- City: Philadelphia, Pennsylvania, US
- Venue: ECW Arena
- Attendance: 800
- Tagline: "The Body Count"

Event chronology
| ← Previous; ASWA/ECW/MEWF Supershow | Next → The Night the Line Was Crossed |

Holiday Hell chronology
| ← Previous; First | Next → 1994 |

Holiday Hell: The Body Count took place on December 26, 1993, in the ECW Arena in Philadelphia, Pennsylvania in the United States. Four matches from Holiday Hell aired on the December 28, 1993 episode of ECW Hardcore TV.

=== Event ===
The announcer for Holiday Hell was Joey Styles. The referees were Jim Molineaux and John Finnegan. The event was attended by approximately 800 people.

The opening bout was a singles match between Chad Austin and the Pitbull. Austin won in an upset by pinfall following a spin kick. After the match, the Pitbull attacked Austin until the Sandman intervened, only for the Pitbull to injure the Sandman's shoulder by giving him a single arm DDT and hitting him in the shoulder with a chain.

The second bout was a singles match between the debuting Mike Awesome and Randy Starr. Awesome won the bout by pinfall.

The third bout saw ECW Tag Team Champions Kevin Sullivan and the Tazmaniac defend their titles against J.T. Smith and Tommy Cairo (with Cairo substituting for Jimmy Snuka). Sullivan and the Tazmaniac won the bout to retain their titles, with the Tazmaniac pinning Cairo.

The fourth bout was a singles match between Shane Douglas and Tommy Dreamer. Douglas won the bout by pinfall after hitting Dreamer with a chain.

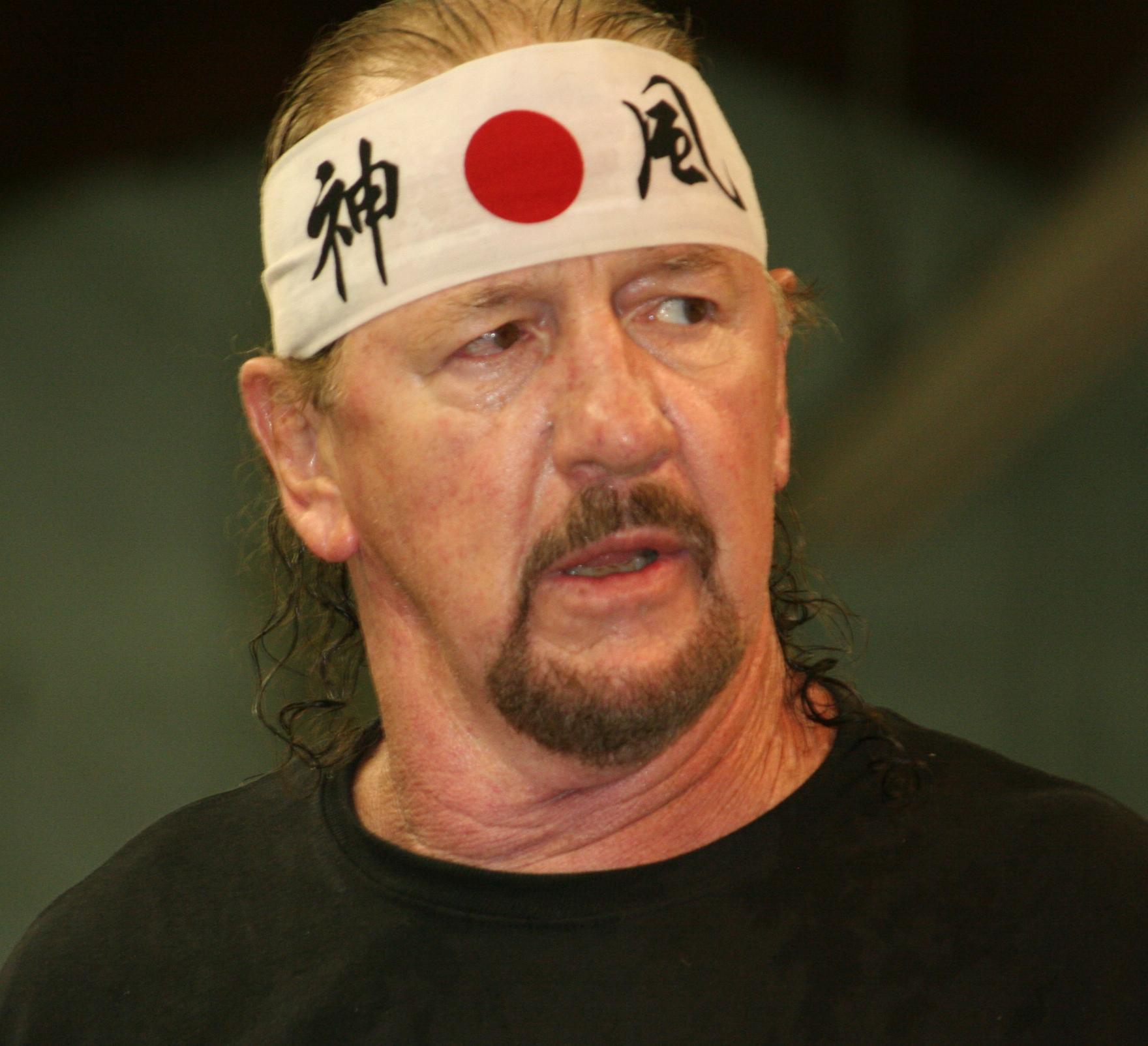
Terry Funk won the ECW Heavyweight Championship at Holiday Hell.

The fifth bout was a singles match between Mr. Hughes and the Sandman. Mr. Hughes won the bout by technical knockout after the Sandman was unable to continue due to his injured shoulder.

The sixth bout was a singles match between Don E. Allen and Rockin' Rebel. Rockin' Rebel won the bout by pinfall following a piledriver.

The seventh bout saw ECW Heavyweight Champion Sabu defend his title against Terry Funk in a no disqualification match. Funk won the bout by pinfall, thus becoming the new ECW Heavyweight Champion, following interference by Shane Douglas and Sherri Martel.

The penultimate bout was the titular "Body Count" match between Pat Tanaka and Rocco Rock as part of the feud between Badd Company and the Public Enemy. The premise of the match was that each man's tag team partner (Paul Diamond and Johnny Grunge respectively) was locked in a cage at ringside, and that the cage containing the losing man's tag team partner would be "blown up". While Tanaka won the bout by pinfall, it was Diamond's cage that was "blown up"; the effect, created using flash paper and sound effects, was underwhelming, receiving an extremely negative reaction from the audience. Despite being heavily promoted, the bout was never aired on ECW programming.

The main event was a "Lights Out" battle royal, with the winner receiving a turkey stuffed with one-hundred-dollar bills. The battle royal was won by Tommy Dreamer, with the second-to-last competitor eliminated being Shane Douglas.

=== Results ===
| No. | Results | Stipulations | Times |
|---|---|---|---|
| 1 | Chad Austin defeated the Pitbull by pinfall | Singles match | 4:30 |
| 2 | Mike Awesome defeated Randy Starr by pinfall | Singles match | 10:00 |
| 3 | Kevin Sullivan and the Tazmaniac (c) defeated J.T. Smith and Tommy Cairo by pinfall | Tag team match for the ECW Tag Team Championship | — |
| 4 | Shane Douglas defeated Tommy Dreamer by pinfall | Singles match | — |
| 5 | Mr. Hughes (with Jason) defeated the Sandman (with Peaches) by technical knockout | Singles match | — |
| 6 | Rockin' Rebel defeated Don E. Allen by pinfall | Singles match | 2:25 |
| 7 | Terry Funk (with Axl Rotten and Ian Rotten) defeated Sabu (c) (with Paul E. Dangerously) by pinfall | No disqualification match for the ECW Heavyweight Championship | — |
| 8 | Pat Tanaka defeated Rocco Rock by pinfall | "Body Count" match | — |
| 9 | Tommy Dreamer won a battle royal | "Lights Out" battle royal | — |
(c) / – the champion(s) heading into the match

== 1994 ==
Holiday Hell (1994)
- The ECW Arena.
- Promotion: Extreme Championship Wrestling
- Date: December 17, 1994 (aired December 20, 1994; December 27, 1994; and January 3, 1995)
- City: Philadelphia, Pennsylvania, US
- Venue: ECW Arena
- Attendance: 800

Event chronology
| ← Previous; November to Remember | Next → Double Tables |

Holiday Hell chronology
| ← Previous; 1993 | Next → 1995 |

The second annual Holiday Hell took place on December 17, 1994, in the ECW Arena in Philadelphia, Pennsylvania, in the United States. Excerpts from Holiday Hell aired on episodes No. 87, No. 88, and No. 89 of the syndicated television show ECW Hardcore TV in December 1994 and January 1995. The event was not released commercially on VHS, but a "fan cam" recording was recorded and traded.

=== Event ===
The event was attended by approximately 800 people. The referees for the event were Jim Molineaux and John Finnegan.

The opening bout was a singles match in which Stevie Richards defeated J.T. Smith by pinfall following a Stevie Kick.

The second bout saw ECW World Television Champion Dean Malenko defend his title against Ray Odyssey. Malenko defeated Odyssey by submission using the Texas Cloverleaf to retain his title.

The third bout was a singles match between Chris Benoit and Hack Meyers. Benoit defeated Myers by technical knockout after Meyers could not continue upon receiving a dragon suplex. Following the match, Meyers was removed on a stretcher.

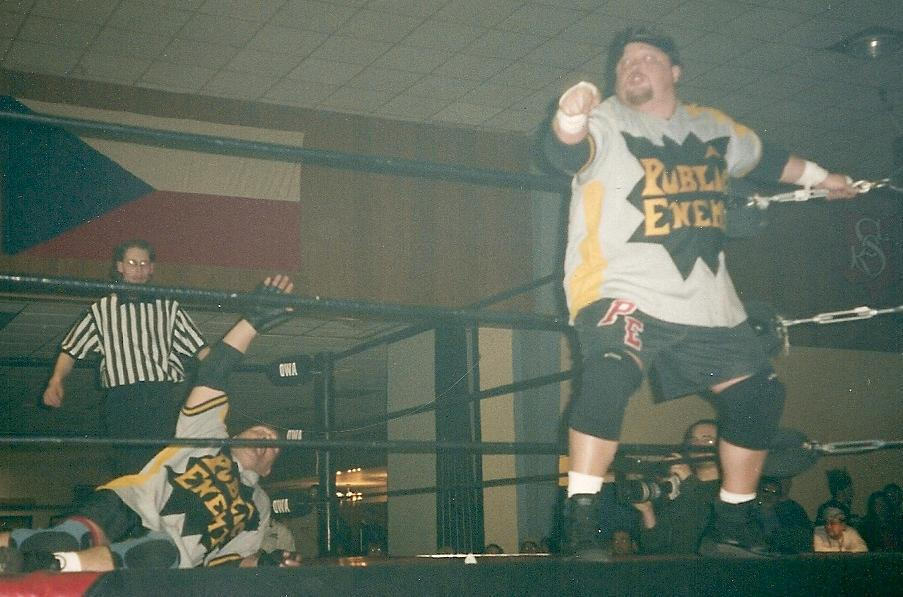
The Public Enemy successfully defended the ECW World Tag Team Championship in the main event of Holiday Hell.

The fourth bout saw 911 face both members of the Pitbulls in a handicap match. Prior to the match, 911 chokeslammed the Pitbulls' manager Jason along with a man dressed as Santa Claus. 911 went on to win the match, pinning both of the Pitbulls after chokeslamming both men.

The fifth bout was a singles match between Don E. Allen and Mikey Whipwreck. Whipwreck won the bout by pinfall following a bulldog. Following the match, Whipwreck was attacked by his former tag team partner Paul Lauria.

The sixth bout was a tag team match pitting Cactus Jack and Tommy Dreamer against the Sandman and Tommy Cairo. Cactus Jack and Dreamer won the bout when Cactus Jack pinned Cairo following a double arm DDT.

The seventh bout saw ECW World Heavyweight Champion Shane Douglas defend his title against Ron Simmons, who wrestled with one arm in a sling. Douglas defeated Simmons by pinfall following a chop block to retain his title.

The main event saw ECW World Tag Team Champions the Public Enemy defend their titles against Sabu and the Tazmaniac. The bout was won by the Public Enemy when Rocco Rock drove both Sabu and the Tazmaniac through a table using the Drive By then pinned the Tazmaniac.

=== Results ===
| No. | Results | Stipulations | Times |
|---|---|---|---|
| 1 | Stevie Richards defeated J.T. Smith by pinfall | Singles match | 5:50 |
| 2 | Dean Malenko (c) defeated Ray Odyssey by submission | Singles match for the ECW World Television Championship | 3:47 |
| 3 | Chris Benoit defeated Hack Myers by technical knockout | Singles match | 4:01 |
| 4 | 911 (with Paul E. Dangerously) defeated The Pitbulls (Pitbull #1 and Pitbull #2) (with Jason) by pinfall | Handicap match | 2:56 |
| 5 | Mikey Whipwreck defeated Don E. Allen by pinfall | Singles match | 2:31 |
| 6 | Cactus Jack and Tommy Dreamer defeated the Sandman (with Woman) and Tommy Cairo (with Angel) by pinfall | Tag team match | 9:41 |
| 7 | Shane Douglas (c) defeated Ron Simmons by pinfall | Singles match for the ECW World Heavyweight Championship | 4:59 |
| 8 | The Public Enemy (Johnny Grunge and Rocco Rock) (c) defeated Sabu and the Tazmaniac (with Paul E. Dangerously) by pinfall | Tag team match for the ECW World Tag Team Championship | — |
(c) / – the champion(s) heading into the match

== 1995 ==
Holiday Hell (1995)
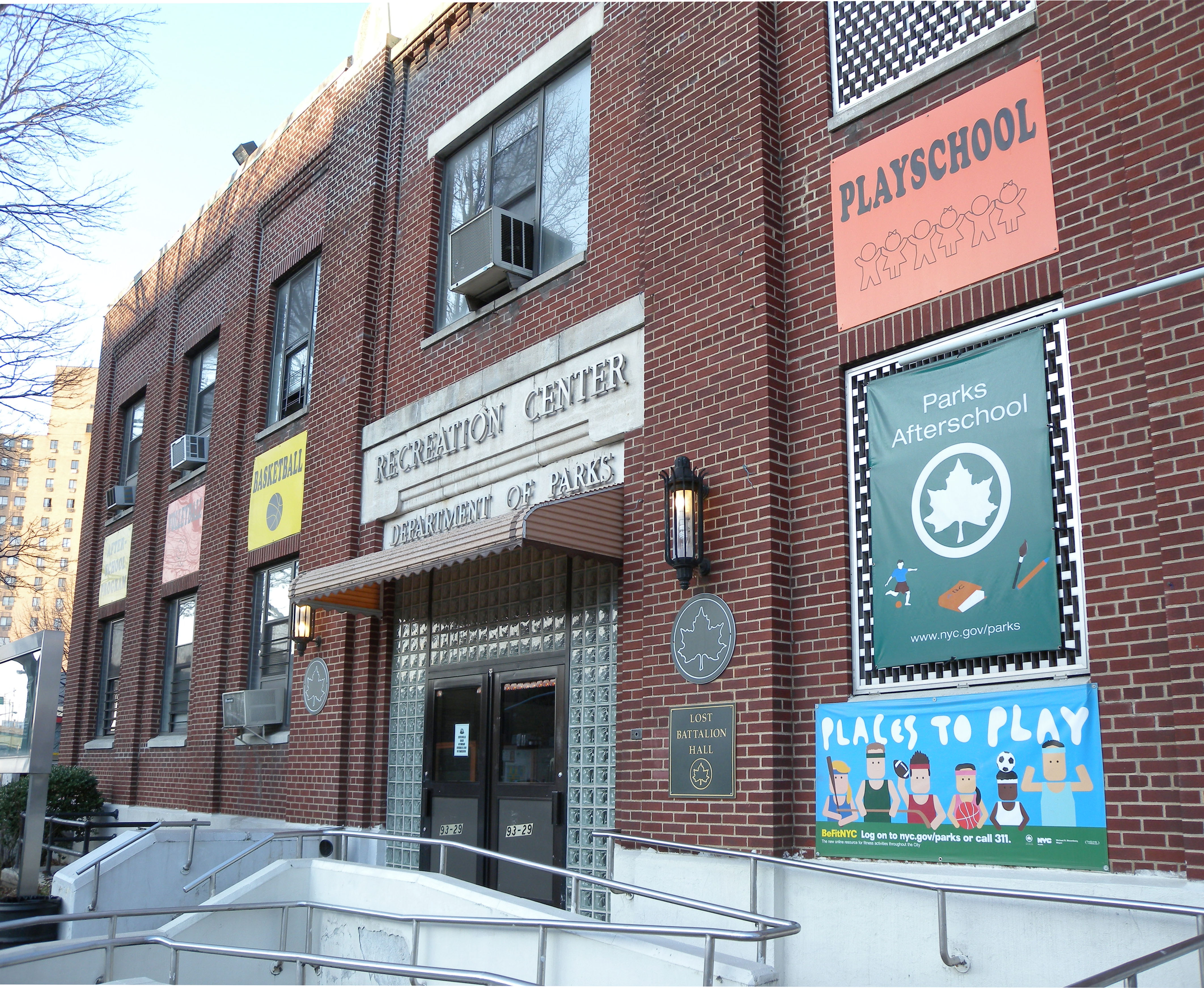
- The Lost Battalion Hall.
- Promotion: Extreme Championship Wrestling
- Date: December 29, 1995 (aired January 2 and 9, 1996)
- City: Rego Park, Queens, New York City, New York, US
- Venue: Lost Battalion Hall
- Attendance: 1,283
- Tagline: "The New York Invasion"

Event chronology
| ← Previous; December to Dismember | Next → House Party |

Holiday Hell chronology
| ← Previous; 1994 | Next → 1996 |

Holiday Hell: The New York Invasion took place on December 29, 1995, in the Lost Battalion Hall in Rego Park, Queens, New York City, New York, US. It was the first ECW supercard to be held in New York City.

Excerpts from Holiday Hell aired on episodes No. 141 and No. 142 of the syndicated television show ECW Hardcore TV in January 1996. Holiday Hell was released on VHS in 1995 and on DVD in 2002. In 2019, it was made available for streaming on the WWE Network. The bout between Tommy Dreamer and Raven also appeared on the 2013 WWE Home Video DVD ECW Unreleased Vol 2, while the main event bout between Cactus Jack and Sabu also appeared on the 2015 DVD ECW Unreleased Vol 3. The bouts between Dreamer and Raven, Cactus Jack and Sabu, and Raven and the Sandman appeared on the 2012 compilation DVD ECW Loves New York.

=== Event ===
The commentator for the event was Joey Styles. The ring announcer was Joel Gertner. The event was attended by 1,283 people.

The event began with announcer Joey Styles giving an introduction. Styles was interrupted by Stevie Richards and the Blue Meanie, with Richards giving a promo in which he claimed the audience had come to see him. While insulting members of the audience, Richards spotted Missy Hyatt, who was seated at ringside. Hyatt agreed to kiss Richards after he promised to get her a date with Raven.

The opening bout was a submission match between Koji Nakagawa and Taz. At the time of the bout, Nakagawa was wrestling for the Japanese promotion Frontier Martial-Arts Wrestling, where he was the Independent World Junior Heavyweight Champion. Taz won a short squash after giving Nakagawa multiple suplexes then forcing him to submit using the Tazmission.

The second bout was a singles match between Hack Meyers and J.T. Smith. Meyers won the bout by pinfall following a modified diving facebuster.

The third bout was a singles match that saw 2 Cold Scorpio defend both the ECW World Television Championship and the ECW World Tag Team Championship against Mikey Whipwreck. 2 Cold Scorpio dominated the match, repeatedly breaking his own pin attempts. Whipwreck won both titles by pinfall after Cactus Jack interfered and gave 2 Cold Scorpio a double arm DDT, then dragged an unconscious Whipwreck on top of 2 Cold Scorpio. Cactus Jack then claimed one-half of the ECW World Tag Team Championship for himself.

The fourth bout was a tag team match between the Eliminators and the Pitbulls. When Pitbull #1 was distracted by the Pitbulls' manager Francine fighting with The Eliminators' manager Jason outside of the ring, the Eliminators won by pinfall after delivering Total Elimination to Pitbull #2.

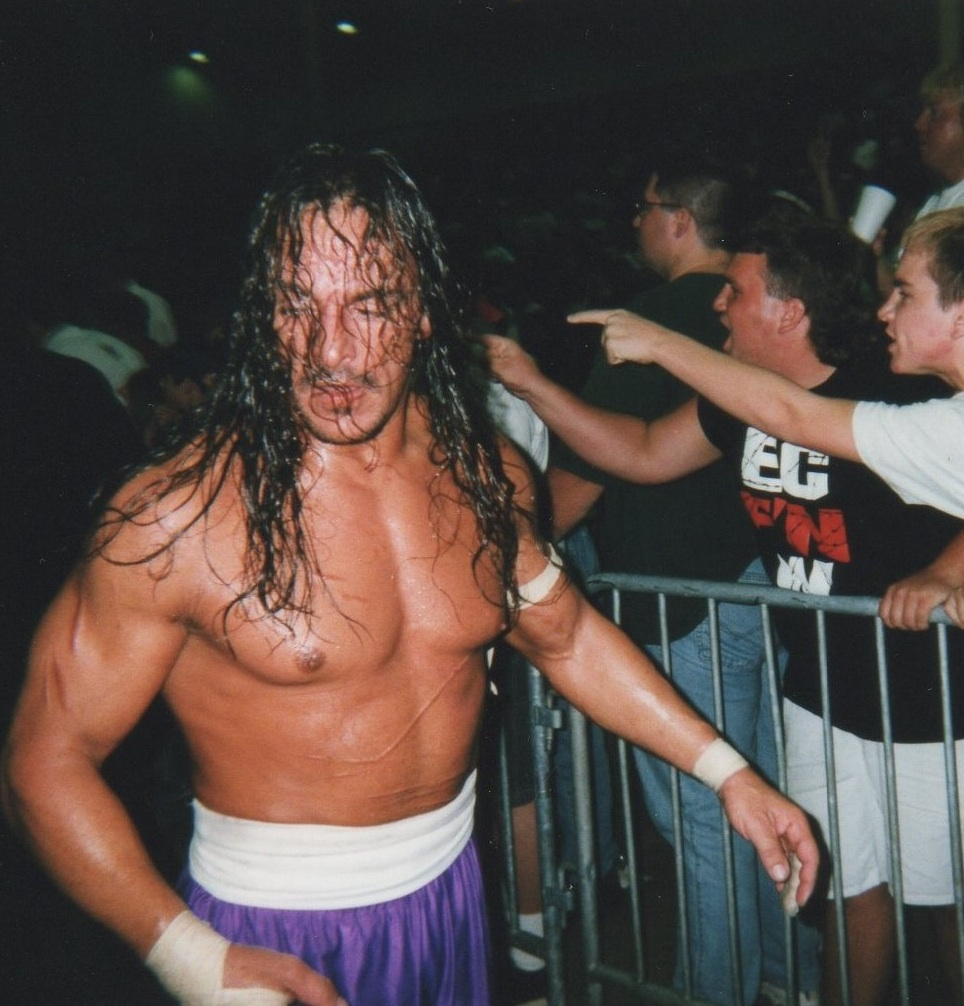
Sabu defeated Cactus Jack in the main event of Holiday Hell.

The fifth bout was scheduled to be between Raven and Tommy Dreamer, with the winner to face the Sandman for the ECW World Heavyweight Championship later in the evening. After Dreamer came to the ring, Raven's henchmen Stevie Richards and the Blue Meanie came to the ring and claimed that Raven could not wrestle due to a broken leg. The Blue Meanie and Richards then attacked Dreamer, who defeated both men by pinfall in quick consecutive squash matches following a pair of DDTs. After Dreamer threatened to piledrive Raven's valet Beulah McGillicutty, Raven entered the ring to begin their match. Raven went on to win the bout by pinfall following a DDT after repeated interference from the members of Raven's Nest.

The eighth bout was a singles match between Bruiser Mastino and El Puerto Riqueño. Mastino won a short bout by pinfall after reversing a diving crossbody into a body slam. After the match, 911 came to the ring and chokeslammed Mastino, which drew out referee Bill Alfonso, who had banned the chokeslam in ECW. This in turn drew out ECW commissioner Tod Gordon who beat down Alfonso. Taz then came to the ring and brawled with 911 until the ECW roster came to the ring to separate them.

Following the eighth bout, Stevie Richards threatened to fire Buh Buh Ray Dudley from Raven's Nest unless he could defeat the Blue Meanie. Dudley went on to defeat the Blue Meanie by pinfall in a short impromptu match following a diving splash. After the match, Buh Buh Ray Dudley and the other Dudley Brothers left Raven's Nest.

The tenth bout saw ECW World Heavyweight Champion The Sandman defend his title against Raven. After Raven attempted to give the Sandman a superplex, the Sandman reversed it into a bulldog, then pinned Raven to retain his title.

The penultimate bout was a tag team match between the Gangstas and the Public Enemy. The Gangstas won the bout when Mustafa pinned Rocco Rock using a roll-up following a chair shot from New Jack.

The main event was a singles match between Cactus Jack and Sabu. Prior to the match, Cactus Jack claimed that the match would be conducted under National Collegiate Athletic Association rules, with strikes and weapons banned and points awarded for takedowns and escapes. However, 911 came to the ring and chokeslammed referee John Moore, taking over the refereeing himself. Sabu won the bout by pinfall after reversing a body slam attempt into a crossbody.

=== Results ===
| No. | Results | Stipulations | Times |
|---|---|---|---|
| 1 | Taz (with Bill Alfonso) defeated Koji Nakagawa by submission | Singles match | 2:34 |
| 2 | Hack Meyers defeated J.T. Smith by pinfall | Singles match | 4:39 |
| 3 | Mikey Whipwreck defeated 2 Cold Scorpio (c) by pinfall | Singles match for the ECW World Television and ECW World Tag Team Championships | 11:54 |
| 4 | The Eliminators (Kronus and Saturn) (with Jason) defeated the Pitbulls (Pitbull #1 and Pitbull #2) (with Francine) by pinfall | Tag team match | 16:13 |
| 5 | Tommy Dreamer defeated the Blue Meanie (with Beulah McGillicutty) by pinfall | Singles match | 0:13 |
| 6 | Tommy Dreamer defeated Stevie Richards (with Beulah McGillicutty) by pinfall | Singles match | 0:11 |
| 7 | Raven (with Beulah McGillicutty, the Blue Meanie, and Stevie Richards) defeated Tommy Dreamer by pinfall | Singles match for the number one contendership to the ECW World Heavyweight Championship | 11:36 |
| 8 | Bruiser Mastino defeated El Puerto Riqueño by pinfall | Singles match | 3:12 |
| 9 | Buh Buh Ray Dudley (with Big Dick Dudley, Dances with Dudley and Sign Guy Dudley) defeated The Blue Meanie by pinfall | Singles match | 1:10 |
| 10 | The Sandman (c) (with Woman) defeated Raven (with Stevie Richards and Beulah McGillicutty) by pinfall | Singles match for the ECW World Heavyweight Championship | 13:16 |
| 11 | The Gangstas (Mustafa and New Jack) defeated the Public Enemy (Johnny Grunge and Rocco Rock) by pinfall | Tag team match | 8:26 |
| 12 | Sabu defeated Cactus Jack by pinfall | "Olympic rules" match | 12:59 |
(c) / – the champion(s) heading into the match

== 1996 ==
Holiday Hell (1996)
- The ECW Arena.
- Promotion: Extreme Championship Wrestling
- Date: December 7, 1996 (aired December 10 and December 17, 1996)
- City: Philadelphia, Pennsylvania, US
- Venue: ECW Arena
- Attendance: 1,150

Event chronology
| ← Previous; November to Remember | Next → House Party |

Holiday Hell chronology
| ← Previous; 1995 | Next → 2000 |

The fourth annual Holiday Hell took place on December 7, 1996, in the ECW Arena in Philadelphia, Pennsylvania in the United States. Excerpts from Holiday Hell aired on the syndicated television program ECW Hardcore TV on December 10 and December 17, 1996, while the tag team match between Beulah McGillicutty/Tommy Dreamer and Francine/Shane Douglas was included on the 2009 compilation DVD ECW: Extreme Evolution.

=== Event ===
The announcer for the event was Joey Styles. The referees were Jeff Jones, Jim Molineaux, and John Moore. The event was attended by approximately 1,150 people.

The opening bout was a tag team match pitting the Dudley Brothers against the Full Blooded Italians. Before the match, Little Guido introduced Davey Pazano as a new member of the Full Blooded Italians, replacing J.T. Smith who had lost a loser leaves town match the prior month at November to Remember. The Dudley Brothers won the bout when Spike Dudley pinned Little Guido following a Rocket Launcher.

The second bout was a singles match between the debuting Balls Mahoney and Devon Storm. Mahoney won the bout by pinfall following a tombstone piledriver.

The third bout was a singles match between Gary Albright and Rick Rage. Albright won a short squash by pinfall following a dragon suplex.

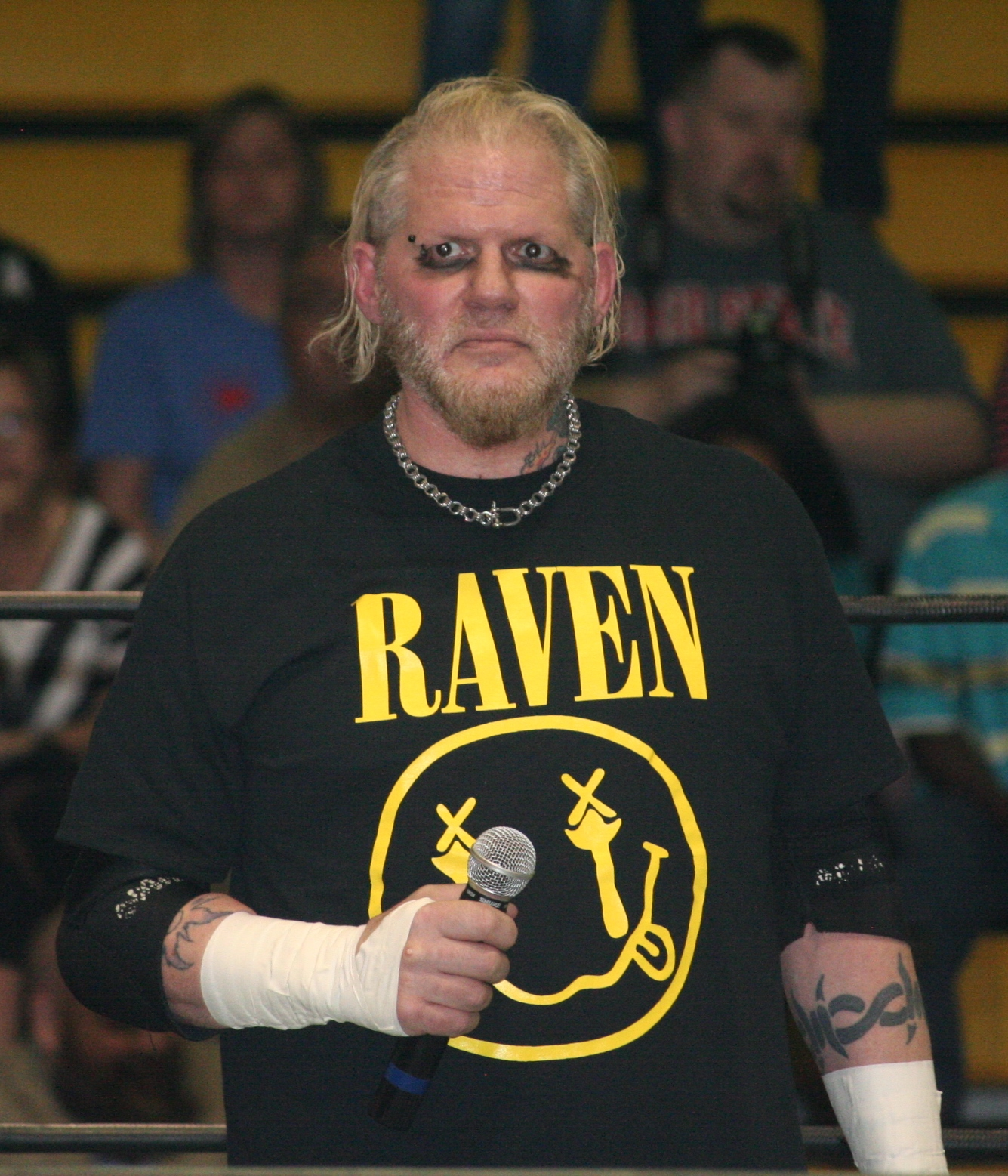
Raven won the ECW World Heavyweight Championship in the main event of Holiday Hell.

The fourth bout was a singles match between Brian Lee and Louie Spicolli. During the match, the referee John Moore was knocked unconscious, prompting Lee's Triple Threat stablemates Chris Candido and Shane Douglas come to the ring and assist Lee. After the three men attacked Spicolli, Lee gave a Prime Time Slam and then pinned him, with Moore recovering in time to count the pinfall. After the match, the Triple Threat attacked Spicolli again, with Pitbull #2 unsuccessfully coming to his aid.

The fifth bout was a singles match between Rob Van Dam and Taz. The bout was won by Taz by technical knockout after he applied the Tazmission to Van Dam until he was rendered unconscious.

The sixth bout saw ECW World Tag Team Champions the Gangstas defend their titles against Axl Rotten and D-Von Dudley. The Gangstas won the bout when New Jack pinned Rotten following a powerslam from Mustafa and a 187 from New Jack, thus retaining their titles.

The seventh bout was an intergender tag team match pitting Beulah McGillicutty and Tommy Dreamer against Francine and Shane Douglas. Francine and Douglas won the bout when Douglas pinned McGillicutty following a belly-to-belly suplex.

The penultimate bout was a singles match between Perry Saturn and Sabu. Sabu won the bout by pinfall following an Arabian Facebuster. Following the match, Saturn and his tag team partner John Kronus attacked Sabu, leading to a brawl that also included Gary Albright, Rob Van Dam, and Taz.

The main event saw ECW World Heavyweight Champion the Sandman defend his title against Raven in a barbed wire match. Raven won the bout by pinfall after giving the Sandman an Evenflow DDT through a table, thus becoming the new ECW World Heavyweight Champion.

=== Results ===
| No. | Results | Stipulations | Times |
|---|---|---|---|
| 1 | The Dudley Brothers (Buh Buh Ray Dudley and Spike Dudley) (with Sign Guy Dudley) defeated the Full Blooded Italians (Davey Pazano and Little Guido) by pinfall | Tag team match | 7:20 |
| 2 | Balls Mahoney defeated Devon Storm (with The Bad Crew) by pinfall | Singles match | 4:45 |
| 3 | Gary Albright defeated Rick Rage by pinfall | Singles match | 2:06 |
| 4 | Brian Lee defeated Louie Spicolli by pinfall | Singles match | 10:30 |
| 5 | Taz (with Bill Alfonso and Team Taz) defeated Rob Van Dam by technical knockout | Singles match | 10:26 |
| 6 | The Gangstas (Mustafa and New Jack) (c) defeated Axl Rotten and D-Von Dudley by pinfall | Tag team match for the ECW World Tag Team Championship | — |
| 7 | Francine and Shane Douglas defeated Beulah McGillicutty and Tommy Dreamer by pinfall | Intergender tag team match | 12:55 |
| 8 | Sabu defeated Saturn by pinfall | Singles match | 19:37 |
| 9 | Raven defeated The Sandman (c) by pinfall | Barbed wire match for the ECW World Heavyweight Championship | 17:39 |
(c) / – the champion(s) heading into the match

== 2000 ==
Holiday Hell (2000)
- The ECW Arena.
- Promotion: Extreme Championship Wrestling
- Date: December 23, 2000
- City: Philadelphia, Pennsylvania, US
- Venue: ECW Arena
- Attendance: 1,000

Event chronology
| ← Previous; Beer, Blood, Babes and Barbed Wire | Next → Final |

Holiday Hell chronology
| ← Previous; 1996 | Next → ECW's Final Show |

After a three-year interval, the fifth Holiday Hell was held on December 23, 2000, in the ECW Arena in Philadelphia, Pennsylvania, in the United States. This was the fourth-from-last event to be held by ECW, and the last ever event to be held in the ECW Arena. The event was released on DVD in 2013 by RF Video with commentary from Danny Doring and Tommy Dreamer.

=== Event ===
The commentators for the event were Joel Gertner and Joey Styles. The event was attended by approximately 1,000 people.

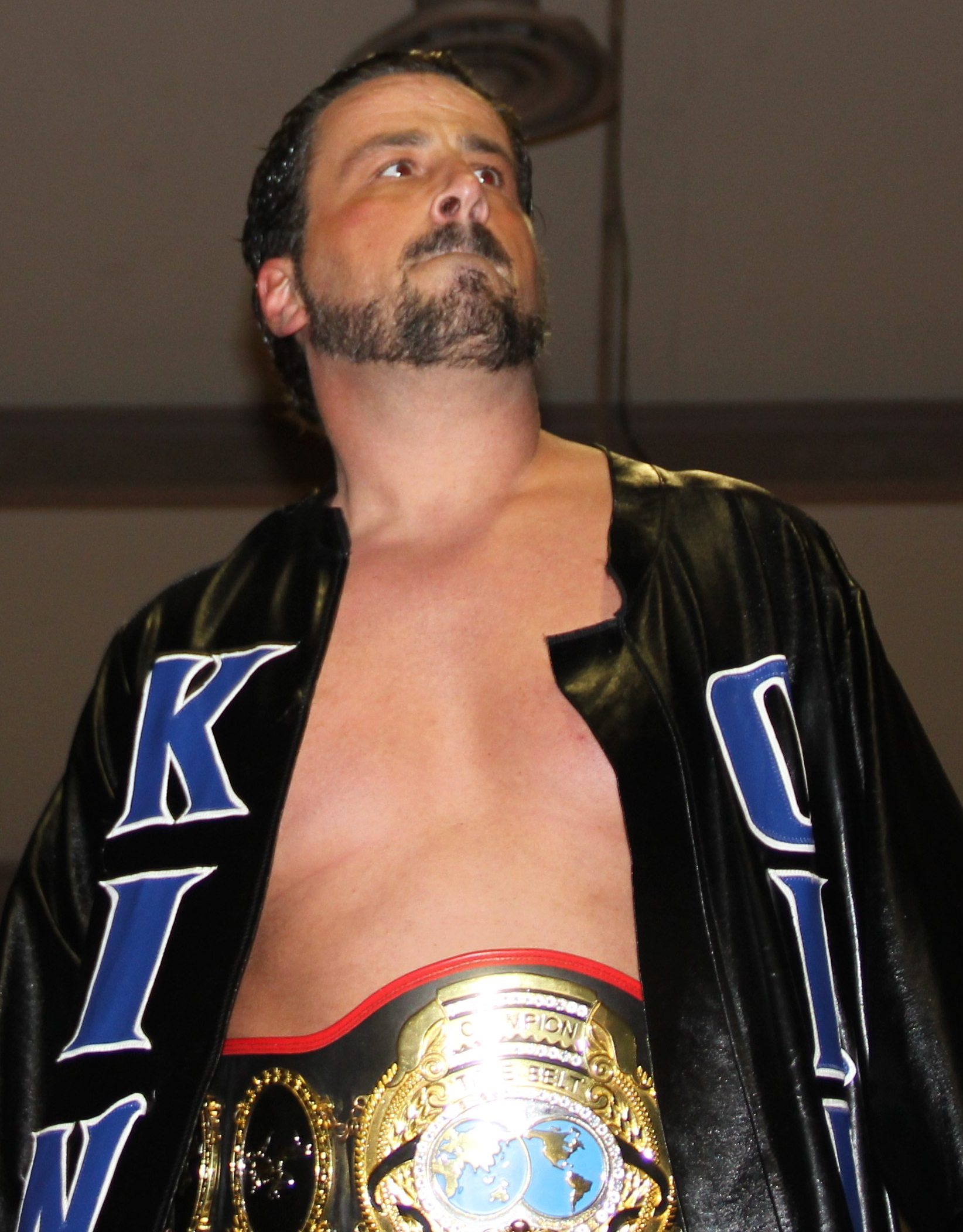
ECW World Heavyweight Champion Steve Corino successfully defended his title in the main event of Holiday Hell.

The opening bout was a singles match between the Blue Boy and Chilly Willy. The match ended in a no contest following interference from Rhino.

The second bout saw ECW World Tag Team Champions Danny Doring and Roadkill defend their titles against Da Baldies. Doring and Roadkill defeated Da Baldies by pinfall to retain their titles, with Doring pinning Angel following a Buggy Bang.

The third bout was a singles match between Balls Mahoney and Bilvis Wesley. Mahoney won the bout by pinfall.

The fourth bout was a singles match between Jerry Lynn and Spike Dudley. Lynn won the bout by pinfall.

The fifth bout was a singles match between C. W. Anderson and Super Crazy. Anderson won the bout by submission.

The sixth bout was a singles match between E. Z. Money and Nova. The bout ended in a no contest as the referee stopped the match as Nova began bleeding from the ear.

The seventh bout was a six-man tag team match pitting Hot Commodity against Christian York, Joey Matthews, and Tommy Dreamer. Hot Commodity won the bout when E. Z. Money pinned Tommy Dreamer following interference from C.W. Anderson.

The eighth bout was a two-out-of-three falls tag team match between the Full Blooded Italians and the Unholy Alliance. The first fall ended in a draw after Little Guido submitted Yoshihiro Tajiri and Tony Mamaluke submitted Mikey Whipwreck simultaneously. The Unholy Alliance won the second fall when Tajiri pinned Mamaluke, then won the third fall when Tajiri submitted Mamaluke.

The main event saw ECW World Heavyweight Champion Steve Corino defend his title against Justin Credible and the Sandman in a three way dance. Corino eliminated Credible by pinning him, then pinned the Sandman to win the bout and retain his title.

=== Results ===
| No. | Results | Stipulations |
|---|---|---|
| 1 | The Blue Boy (with Jasmine St. Claire) vs. Chilly Willy ended in a no contest | Singles match |
| 2 | Danny Doring and Roadkill (c) defeated Da Baldies (Angel and DeVito) by pinfall | Tag team match for the ECW World Tag Team Championship |
| 3 | Balls Mahoney defeated Bilvis Wesley (with Chris Krueger, Tom Marquez & The Prodigette) by pinfall | Singles match |
| 4 | Jerry Lynn (with Cyrus) defeated Spike Dudley by pinfall | Singles match |
| 5 | C. W. Anderson defeated Super Crazy by submission | Singles match |
| 6 | E. Z. Money vs. Nova ended in a no contest | Singles match |
| 7 | Hot Commodity (Chris Hamrick, E. Z. Money, and Julio Dinero) defeated Christian York, Joey Matthews, and Tommy Dreamer by pinfall | Six-man tag team match |
| 8 | Unholy Alliance (Mikey Whipwreck and Yoshihiro Tajiri) defeated the Full Blooded Italians (Little Guido and Tony Mamaluke) (w/ Sal E. Graziano) by submission | Two-out-of-three falls tag team match |
| 9 | Steve Corino (c) (with Jack Victory) defeated Justin Credible (with Francine) and the Sandman by pinfall | Three way dance for the ECW World Heavyweight Championship |
(c) / – the champion(s) heading into the match
