= NWA World Title Tournament =

1994 Eastern Championship Wrestling supercard event and tournament

- Video: Shane Douglas' speech and his subsequent throwing down of the NWA World title before proclaiming himself ECW World Heavyweight Champion
- Promotion: Eastern Championship Wrestling
- Date: August 27, 1994
- City: Philadelphia, Pennsylvania, U.S.
- Venue: ECW Arena
- Attendance: 1,000

Event chronology
← Previous; Hardcore Heaven	Next → November to Remember

The NWA World Title Tournament was a live supercard held by the American professional wrestling promotion Eastern Championship Wrestling (ECW) on August 27, 1994. The event featured a tournament for the vacant NWA World Heavyweight Championship. Highlights from the event aired on the August 29, 1994, episode of ECW Hardcore TV, while the tournament final and the bout between Shane Douglas and 2 Cold Scorpio appeared on the 2012 WWE DVD and Blu-ray release ECW Unreleased: Vol 1; the bout between 911 and Doink the Clown appeared on the 2013 WWE Blu-ray release ECW Unreleased: Vol 2; and the bout between Cactus Jack and Mikey Whipwreck and the Public Enemy was included in the 2005 compilation DVD BloodSport – The Most Violent Matches of ECW. The commentator for the event was Joey Styles.

The event is known for the speech given by the tournament winner, ECW Heavyweight Champion Shane Douglas, who dropped the NWA World Heavyweight Championship belt and proclaimed the ECW Heavyweight Championship to be a world championship. Douglas' speech presaged the emergence of ECW – renamed Extreme Championship Wrestling shortly after the event – as a nationally recognized promotion and the continued decline in the power and profile of the National Wrestling Alliance (NWA), to which the promotion had hitherto been affiliated. The event has been described by WWE as "one of the most controversial incidents to ever occur at any sports entertainment event". Douglas described his throwing down of the title strap as "the defining moment for [his] career".

== Background ==
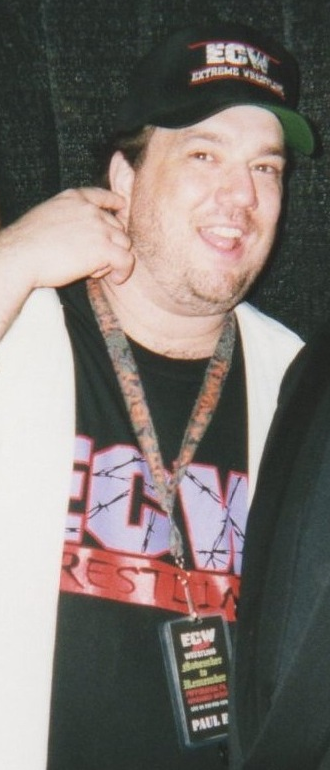
Eastern Championship Wrestling booker Paul Heyman, who orchestrated Douglas' throwing down of the NWA World Heavyweight Championship belt.

The NWA World Heavyweight Championship was the principal championship recognized by professional wrestling promotions affiliated with the National Wrestling Alliance (NWA), then the governing body of the American professional wrestling industry. By the early 1990s, the largest NWA affiliate was World Championship Wrestling (WCW). In 1993, the relationship between WCW and the NWA board of directors began to deteriorate. In September 1993, WCW withdrew from the NWA and the NWA World Heavyweight Championship – held by WCW employee Ric Flair – was vacated.

After the title had been vacant for several months, NWA board member Dennis Coralluzzo proposed holding a tournament to crown a new NWA World Heavyweight Champion. Tod Gordon and Paul Heyman – the owner and booker of the NWA affiliate Eastern Championship Wrestling (ECW) – wrote to the board of directors proposing that ECW host the tournament given that it had more television exposure than any other NWA affiliate. The board of directors accepted the proposal. Ostensibly unbeknownst to them, Gordon and Heyman – who had previously had disagreements with Coralluzzo – planned to use the tournament to publicly break away from the NWA and springboard ECW to prominence. Gordon and Heyman approached Shane Douglas, the planned winner of the tournament, who agreed to their plan.

== Event ==
The event featured an eight-man tournament for the vacant championship. The tournament began with Dean Malenko defeating the Japanese wrestler Osamu Nishimura by submission using a standing figure-four leglock, followed by 911 squashing the surprise wild card entrant, Doink the Clown, with a series of chokeslams. Douglas, the-then ECW Heavyweight Champion, pinned the Tazmaniac with a roll-up, followed by 2 Cold Scorpio defeating Chris Benoit in an "aerial showcase" by reversing Benoit's superplex into a small package. In the semi-finals, 2 Cold Scorpio defeated 911 by count-out after 911 was distracted by Douglas (disguised as Doink the Clown), while Douglas pinned Malenko following two piledrivers.

In between the semifinals and the finals, there was a scheduled tag team bout for the ECW Tag Team Championship between champions the Public Enemy (Johnny Grunge and Rocco Rock) and challengers Cactus Jack and Terry Funk. After Funk was forced to withdraw from the event due to missing a flight, Tommy Dreamer was teased as Funk's replacement but was attacked by the Public Enemy, with Rocco Rock putting him through a table using a diving senton. Mikey Whipwreck was then announced as Funk's surprise replacement. Cactus Jack and Whipwreck went on to score an upset victory over the Public Enemy, with Whipwreck pinning Rock after Cactus Jack jostled him while he was on the top rope, causing him to fall and hit his groin on the ring rope.

In the final bout of the tournament, Douglas pinned 2 Cold Scorpio following a belly-to-belly suplex.

After being presented with the NWA World Heavyweight Championship belt, Douglas began to deliver an acceptance speech before abruptly throwing down the title belt and instead picking up the ECW Heavyweight Championship belt, proclaiming himself to be the "ECW Heavyweight Champion of the world".

In the tradition of Lou Thesz, in the tradition of Jack Brisco of the Brisco Brothers, of Dory Funk, Jr., of Terry Funk: the man who will never die. As the real "Nature Boy" Buddy Rogers, upstairs tonight. From the Harley Races, to the Barry Windhams, to the...Ric Flairs, I accept this heavyweight title.

Wait a second, wait a second. Of Kerry Von Erich. Of the fat man himself, Dusty Rhodes. This is it tonight, dad. God, that's beautiful. And Rick Steamboat...and they can all kiss my ass!

Because I am not the man who accepts a torch to be handed down to me from an organization that died - RIP - seven years ago. The Franchise, Shane Douglas, is the man who ignites the new flame of the sport of professional wrestling.

Tonight, before God and my father as witness, I declare myself, the Franchise, as the new ECW Heavyweight Champion of the world.

We have set out to change the face of professional wrestling. So tonight, let the new era begin: the era of the sport of professional wrestling; the era of the Franchise; the era of the ECW.

— Shane Douglas, August 27, 1994

== Aftermath ==
Coralluzzo was interviewed immediately after the event, referring to Douglas' actions as "a disgrace" and stating that he would move to have Douglas stripped of both championships. There are conflicting accounts as to whether Coralluzzo was aware in advance that Douglas intended to throw down the belt. On the August 29, 1994, episode of ECW Hardcore TV, Tod Gordon delivered a promo stating that ECW had withdrawn from the NWA, had renamed itself Extreme Championship Wrestling and would recognise Douglas as its world heavyweight champion.

I listened with great interest as the representative of the NWA board of directors took it upon himself to inform you that they have the power to force NWA Eastern Championship Wrestling not to recognize the Franchise, Shane Douglas, as a world heavyweight champion. Well, as of noon today, I have folded NWA Eastern Championship Wrestling. In its place will be ECW – Extreme Championship Wrestling – and we recognize the Franchise, Shane Douglas, as our World Heavyweight Champion. And we encourage any wrestler in the world today to come to the ECW to challenge for that belt. This is the ECW, Extreme Championship Wrestling, changing the face of professional wrestling.

— Tod Gordon, August 29, 1994

The ECW Tag Team Championship and ECW Television Championship were also renamed the ECW World Tag Team Championship and ECW World Television Championship.

The NWA World Heavyweight Championship remained vacant until November 19, 1994, when Chris Candido won a tournament in Cherry Hill, New Jersey, hosted by Smoky Mountain Wrestling, defeating Tracy Smothers in the finals. Douglas' actions have been described as "killing the title's credibility forever".

== Results ==
No.	Results	Stipulations	Times
1	Dean Malenko defeated Osamu Nishimura (with Mr. Toyota) by submission	Tournament quarter-final	—
2	911 (with Paul E. Dangerously) defeated Doink the Clown by pinfall	Tournament quarter-final	1:57
3	Shane Douglas defeated The Tazmaniac by pinfall	Tournament quarter-final	8:19
4	2 Cold Scorpio defeated Chris Benoit by pinfall	Tournament quarter-final	11:20
5	2 Cold Scorpio defeated 911 (with Paul E. Dangerously) by count-out	Tournament semi-final	10:01
6	Shane Douglas defeated Dean Malenko by pinfall	Tournament semi-final	13:25
7	Cactus Jack and Mikey Whipwreck defeated the Public Enemy (Johnny Grunge and Rocco Rock) (c) by pinfall	Tag team match for the ECW Tag Team Championship	14:04
8	Shane Douglas defeated 2 Cold Scorpio by pinfall	Tournament final for the NWA World Heavyweight Championship	12:52
(c) / – the champion(s) heading into the match

=== Tournament brackets ===
Quarterfinals
2 Cold Scorpio	Pin
Chris Benoit	11:20
911	Pin
Doink the Clown	1:57
Dean Malenko	Submission
Osamu Nishimura
Shane Douglas	Pin
The Tazmaniac	8:19

Semifinals
2 Cold Scorpio	Count-out
911	10:01
Shane Douglas	Pin
Dean Malenko	13:25

Finals
2 Cold Scorpio	Pin
Shane Douglas	12:52

== See also ==
- 1994 in professional wrestling
