= NWA World Light Heavyweight Championship (New Jersey version) =

The New Jersey version of the NWA World Light Heavyweight Championship was a short-lived National Wrestling Alliance title recognized in the U.S. state of New Jersey in 1997 and 1998. The title used the word "light heavyweight" as the NWA World Junior Heavyweight Championship was still controlled by New Japan Pro-Wrestling at the time as part of the J-Crown.

This version of the title is in no way related to the original version of the championship, defended in the Mexican professional wrestling promotion, Consejo Mundial de Lucha Libre (CMLL), in use since the early 1950s. As a regional-based title, it was contended for by the local talent, resulting in two champions that were way over the weight limit, 911 and The Blue Meanie.

== Title history ==
No.	Wrestler:	Times:	Date:	Days held	Location:	Notes:
1	Steve Corino	1	May 3, 1997	247	Freehold Borough, New Jersey	Defeated Adam Flash to become the first champion.
—	Vacated	—	January 5, 1998	—	N/A	
2	Devon Storm	1	February 14, 1998	167	Mount Holly, New Jersey	Defeated Reckless Youth in a tournament final to win the vacant title.
—	Vacated	—	July 31, 1998	—	Mount Holly, New Jersey	
3	Ace Darling	1	July 31, 1998	21	Mount Holly, New Jersey	Defeated Ray Odyssey to win the vacant title.
4	911	1	August 21, 1998	11-35	Fairless Hills, Pennsylvania	
—	Vacated	—	September 1998	—	N/A	911 was stripped of the title by commissioner A.J. Sparxx as he is way over the weight limit.
5	Johnny Hot Body	1	September 25, 1998	0	Blackwood, New Jersey	Awarded the title.
6	Rik Ratchett	1	September 25, 1998	43	Blackwood, New Jersey	
7	Stevie Richards	1	November 7, 1998	6	Absecon, New Jersey	
8	Rik Ratchett	2	November 13, 1998	22	Hazlet, New Jersey	
9	The Blue Meanie	1	December 5, 1998	21	Toms River, New Jersey	
—	Vacated	—	December 26, 1998	—	N/A	The Blue Meanie was stripped of the title by the NWA Board of Directors as he is way over the weight limit. The title was later abandoned and replaced with the NWA New Jersey Junior Heavyweight Championship.

== See also ==
- National Wrestling Alliance
- NWA World Light Heavyweight Championship (original version based in Mexico's CMLL until 2010)
