= Mae Weston =

American professional wrestler (1938–1989)

Personal information
- Born: Betty Mae Garvey; January 30, 1923 Kansas, US
- Died: October 14, 1999 (aged 76)

Professional wrestling career
- Ring name(s): Mae Weston; Maw Bass
- Trained by: Billy Wolfe
- Debut: 1938
- Retired: 1994

Betty Mae Garvey (January 30, 1923 – October 14, 1999), better known by her ring name Mae Weston, was an American female professional wrestler.

== Wrestling career ==
Started her wrestling career at 15 years old in 1938. During her career, she had feuds with Mildred Burke.

She won her only title, the California Women's Championship in 1967 when she defeated Mae Young.

In 1973, she managed the heel stable The Bass Family Ron Bass (wrestler) and Don Bass (wrestler). The duo was managed by their "mother", Maw Bass. Maw carried a loaded purse, with which she would strike their opponents to steal a victory. Sometimes she teamed up with them in tag matches. In 1974, she retired from wrestling.

On June 16, 1994, she wrestled her last match at 71 in a tag team match with Stormy Apple as they lost to Josie Navarro and Margaret Garcia at Ladies International Wrestling Association in Las Vegas, Nevada.

== Death ==
Weston passed away on October 14, 1999, at 76.

== Personal life ==
A biography was released on June 15, 2016 by Robert Grey Reynolds Jr. Mae Weston Acrobat, Boxer and Wrestler on eBook.

== Championships and accomplishments ==
- National Wrestling Alliance
  - California Women's Championship (1 time)
