= 911 (wrestler) =

American professional wrestler (born 1957)

Personal information
- Born: Alfred Poling; January 22, 1957 (age 69) New York City, U.S.

Professional wrestling career
- Ring name(s): 911; Al The Sledgehammer; Big Al; Sledge Hammer; Tombstone
- Billed height: 6 ft 7 in (201 cm)
- Billed weight: 300 lb (136 kg)
- Trained by: Larry Sharpe
- Debut: 1990
- Retired: 2006

Alfred Poling (born January 22, 1957) is an American retired professional wrestler, better known by the ring name 911. He is best known for his appearances with Extreme Championship Wrestling (ECW) between 1994 and 1996.

== Professional wrestling career ==
=== Early career (1990–1994) ===
Poling was trained as a wrestler by Larry Sharpe. He debuted in 1990, wrestling on the independent circuit under the ring name "Al the Sledgehammer".

=== Eastern/Extreme Championship Wrestling (1994–1996, 1998) ===
Poling achieved his greatest national exposure in Extreme Championship Wrestling (ECW) in the mid-1990s. He debuted in ECW as an unnamed "handler" to Sabu on the January 18, 1994 episode of Extreme Championship Wrestling by defeating Chad Austin. Poling joined Paul Heyman's Dangerous Alliance stable with Sabu and The Tazmaniac. His gimmick was as an enforcer of the "extreme" attitude; he was named 911 at The Night the Line Was Crossed on February 5, where he defeated Chad Austin in a rematch. As part of his monstrous persona, he would frequently perform the chokeslam on others with little provocation, which made him quickly popular with the crowd as a fan favorite. He received his first title shot in ECW at When Worlds Collide, where he challenged Mikey Whipwreck for the ECW Television Championship but got disqualified after chokeslamming the referee. He would then enter a rivalry with Mr. Hughes, whom he defeated at Hardcore Heaven. On August 27, at the NWA World Title Tournament, 911 participated in the namesake tournament for the vacant NWA World Heavyweight Championship, where he defeated Doink the Clown in the quarter-final after four chokeslams, before losing to 2 Cold Scorpio in the semi-final. He closed the year by defeating The Pitbulls in a handicap match at Holiday Hell. Poling received the Pro Wrestling Illustrated Rookie of the Year award due to his enormous popularity in ECW for the year 1994.

Poling had two big matches in 1995, scoring wins over Ron Simmons at Hostile City Showdown and Jim Steele at Barbed Wire, Hoodies & Chokeslams. At the 1996 House Party event, 911 teamed with Rey Misterio, Jr. to defeat The Eliminators in a tag team match, which would turn out to be his last match in ECW. He got involved in a brawl with Taz after the match and a feud evolved between the two, but it was scrapped as Poling left the promotion by early 1996 after a falling out backstage with Paul Heyman over the former's treatment of the ring crew.

In 1998, Poling returned to ECW at UltraClash in Philadelphia, Pennsylvania, chokeslamming Bill Wiles. Poling was then accompanied by manager Judge Jeff Jones, who proclaimed 911 to be the true giant of professional wrestling. They were then interrupted by Spike Dudley and had an impromptu match, which 911 lost in under a minute.

=== World Championship Wrestling (1996–1997) ===
Poling wrestled in World Championship Wrestling (WCW) in 1996 and 1997, under the names Tombstone, Sledge Hammer and Big Al.

=== Late career (since 1997) ===
Throughout the late 1990s, 911 appeared with the New Jersey–based Jersey All Pro Wrestling promotion, winning the JAPW Heavyweight Championship on two occasions. He made an appearance at Pro-Pain Pro Wrestling A War Renewed on June 29, 2002, in Philadelphia, Pennsylvania, interfering on the behalf of Tod Gordon and Sabu, delivering a chokeslam to Sandman (who had just been betrayed by his partner, Bill Alfonso). At Hardcore Homecoming in 2005 he chokeslammed both Danny Doring and Roadkill. He wrestled at New York Wrestling League in 2008. He appeared at the 2020 GTS Regal Rumble to eliminate Tito the Clown after Grim called him for help, but it was Mike Swanson, Hitman Jones and Sicend that eliminated Tito.

== Personal life ==
Poling resides in West Creek, New Jersey and has eight children. His son Vinny Poling is also a professional wrestler in the independent circuit.

== Championships and accomplishments ==
- All American Wrestling Alliance
  - AAWA Heavyweight Championship (1 time)
- Jersey All Pro Wrestling
  - JAPW Heavyweight Championship (2 times)
- New Jack City Wrestling
  - NJCW Heavyweight Championship (2 times)
- NWA New Jersey
  - NWA New Jersey State Heavyweight Championship (2 times)
  - NWA World Light Heavyweight Championship (1 time)
- Pro Wrestling Illustrated
  - Rookie of the Year (1994)
