= Curtis Hughes =

American professional wrestler (born 1964)

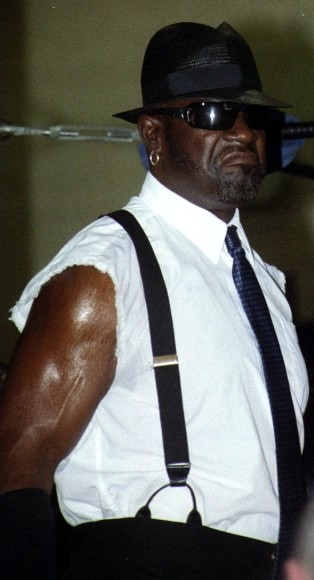
- Hughes in 2001

Personal information
- Born: December 7, 1964 (age 61) Kansas City, Missouri, U.S.

Professional wrestling career
- Ring name(s): The Big Cat; Big Cat Hughes; Curtis Hughes; Gotch Gracie; Mr. Hughes; The Ruffneck
- Billed height: 6 ft 6 in (198 cm)
- Billed weight: 330 lb (150 kg)
- Billed from: Kansas City, Kansas
- Trained by: Sonny Myers; Bob Geigel
- Debut: 1987

Curtis Hughes (born December 7, 1964) is an American professional wrestler, also known by the ring name Mr. Hughes. He is best known for his stints in World Championship Wrestling and the World Wrestling Federation. He also worked for the American Wrestling Association, the American Wrestling Federation and Extreme Championship Wrestling. He trained wrestlers at WWA4 wrestling school for more than ten years and wrestles on the independent circuit.

== Professional wrestling career ==
=== Early career (1988–1990) ===
While briefly attending Kansas State University, Hughes played on their football team. After leaving university, he trained for professional wrestling under Sonny Myers and Bob Geigel. He debuted in 1988 for Central States Wrestling, before moving to the American Wrestling Association as a face under the ring name Curtis "The Cat" Hughes. Hughes stayed with American Wrestling Association until it went bankrupt in August 1990.

=== World Championship Wrestling (1990–1992) ===
He moved to World Championship Wrestling in November 1990, where he was called Big Cat. At Starrcade 1991 in Tokyo Dome, he was billed as the Big Cat, teaming with the Motor City Madman. He subsequently became known as Mr. Hughes, a heel enforcer gimmick with a suit and constant frown. He was a member of The York Foundation faction. He later became bodyguard for Lex Luger and his manager Harley Race, coming down to ringside with Race in the closing moments of Luger's win of the vacant WCW World Heavyweight Championship, distracting opponent Barry Windham so that Luger, under orders from Race, could administer a piledriver to win the match and the championship. Champion Luger, manager Race and bodyguard Hughes formed a heel faction, inflicting beatdowns to Luger's challengers and with Hughes and Race interfering in Luger's title matches. This ultimately resulted in Hughes being banned from ringside for Luger's high profile title defences against Ron Simmons at Halloween Havoc 1991 and Rick Steiner at Clash of the Champions XVII. Still managed by Race, in early 1992 he also teamed frequently with Big Van Vader, Cactus Jack and Vinnie Vegas.

In summer 1992, near the end of his WCW run, he turned face and became Big Cat again, teaming with Junkyard Dog to feud with The Vegas Connection.

=== World Wrestling Federation (1993) ===
After a short stint in the United States Wrestling Association, Hughes joined the World Wrestling Federation in March, as part of the feud between The Undertaker and Harvey Wippleman. Hughes stole The Undertaker's urn, but then lost every match between them and relinquished it.

During his stay, he also lost to Mr. Perfect by disqualification in the 1993 King of the Ring. He scored victories over Bob Backlund, Owen Hart, Marty Jannetty, Jim Duggan, Kamala, Tito Santana, 123 Kid and Randy Savage. Hughes' last televised match was against Tatanka, which he lost via countout when his sunglasses cracked into his eyes on the August 9 Monday Night Raw episode (taped July 25). Hughes was released the next day. He left the WWF in August.

=== Eastern/Extreme Championship Wrestling (1993–1994, 1996, 1998) ===
In October 1993, Hughes debuted for Eastern Championship Wrestling. After the promotion was renamed Extreme Championship Wrestling in 1994, he became bodyguard for Shane Douglas during Douglas' first and second ECW World Heavyweight Championship reigns. He frequently teamed with Douglas, as well as wrestling in singles matches, nicknamed "The Ruffneck". He left ECW after losing to Too Cold Scorpio at November to Remember (1994).

Hughes returned to ECW in January 1996. He lost to Sabu at Big Apple Blizzard Blast and lost to Buh Buh Ray Dudley at Cyberslam 1996.

Then returned for a one-night appearance on November 21, 1998 losing to Spike Dudley at an ECW house show.

=== Various promotions (1993–1999) ===
During this period, he also made appearances in the American Wrestling Federation, where he was a part of Shiek Adnan Al-Kaissey's heel stable. He also had many appearances in Puerto Rico for the World Wrestling Council from 1993 to 1996 where he battled against Carlos Colón, Invader 1 and Abdullah The Butcher.

On March 2, 1994, he lost to Haku for Wrestle Association R in Japan. Hughes mainly worked in the independent circuit including National Wrestling Conference in Las Vegas.

He lost to Tito Santana on August 21, 1997, for USA Pro Wrestling in Newark, New Jersey.

In early 1999, he feuded with Kevin Sullivan at Championship Wrestling in Ohio.

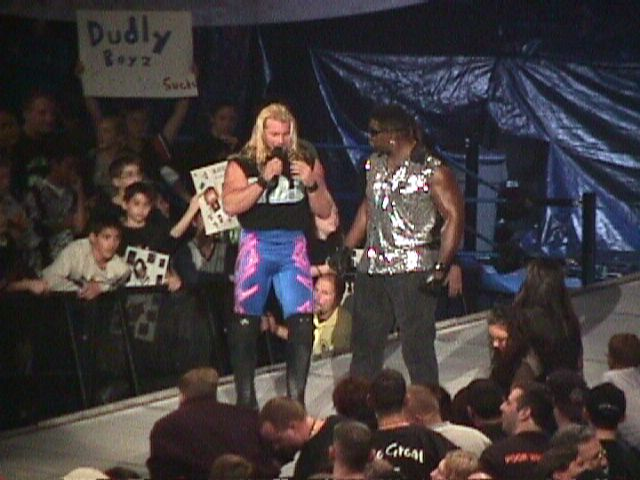
Hughes (right) with Chris Jericho, during his short stint as Jericho's enforcer in 1999

=== Return to the WWF (1997, 1999) ===
Hughes made two more brief appearances for the WWF. First, in January 1997 as Hunter Hearst Helmsley's bodyguard before being replaced by Chyna in February.

Then in September 1999 he returned again as a masked opponent for Chris Jericho called "Gotch Gracie". This was later revealed to be a set up when both attacked Ken Shamrock and "Gracie" revealed himself to be Jericho's new bodyguard (as Curtis Hughes). Hughes was notably smaller in this run having lost a significant amount of weight. He defeated Ken Shamrock by disqualification on September 16, 1999 Smackdown episode. He aligned himself with Jericho and Howard Finkel (who was Jericho's lackey at the time) however Jericho turned on him during a tag team match and Hughes lost Finkel in a poker game to the APA. He then left the WWF again.

=== World Wrestling Alliance and the independent circuit (1999–present) ===
In 1999, Hughes lost a lot of weight and began working on the independent circuit and later became head trainer at the Atlanta-based World Wrestling Alliance's WWA4 Wrestling School. In late 2003, Hughes worked for the newly formed All World Wrestling League/Big Time Wrestling. In 2006, WWA4 launched a locally-aired professional wrestling program, which Hughes co-hosted with announcer and the executive producer, Taylor McKnight. When Mcknight left WWA4 for Great Championship Wrestling, Dave Wills co-hosted with Hughes. After beginning classes at the WWA4 school, Hughes' weight dropped from 310 pounds to 250 pounds.

In 2007, Hughes began a high-profile Memphis Wrestling feud when he called Jerry Lawler a "sell out" for not showing up for a scheduled match against Hulk Hogan (Lawler worked for World Wrestling Entertainment, who objected to the match). Hughes shoved Lawler's real life girlfriend, Renee, on an episode of Memphis Primetime, and the two battled three weeks later at Sam's Town River Palace Arena in Tunica, Mississippi. The match ended when Hughes kneeled and apologized to Lawler, before hitting him with a low blow and punching Renee in the face, thus losing by disqualification.

In March 2011, Hughes headlined the inaugural Redneck Wrasslin Organization card in Springfield, Illinois, teaming with Pretty Boy Floyd and Beast to defeat Team Dragonfire.

On February 18, 2012, Hughes won a 34-man battle royal for the vacant Peachstate Wrestling Alliance Heritage Championship.

On April 11, 2016, he stepped down as head trainer of WWA4 with his trainee AR Fox taking over the role.

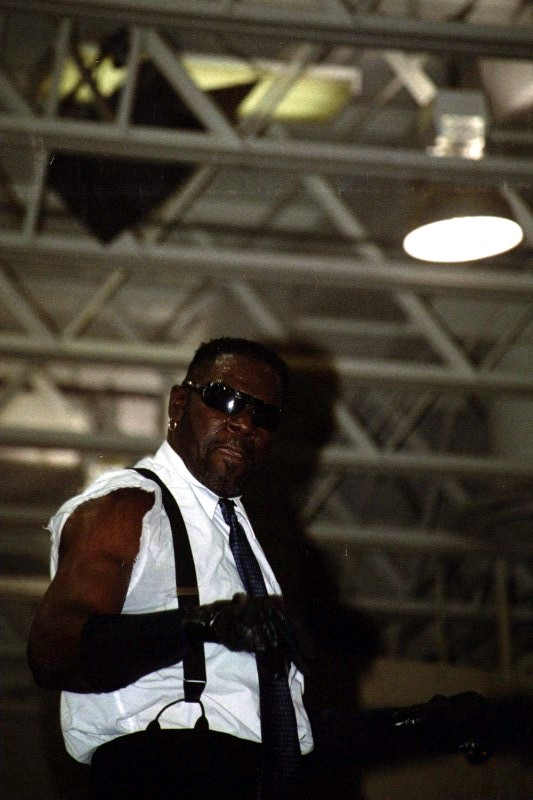
Mr. Hughes in 2009

== Championship and accomplishments ==
- Galaxy Wrestling Federation
  - GWF Heavyweight Championship (1 time)
- Independent Wrestling Network
  - IWN Heavyweight Championship (1 time)
- International Wrestling Union
  - IWU Heavyweight Championship (1 time)
- Peachstate Wrestling Alliance
  - PWA Heritage Championship (1 time)
- Pro Wrestling Illustrated
  - PWI ranked him #62 of the 500 best singles wrestlers in the PWI 500 in 1993
  - PWI ranked him #412 of the 500 best singles wrestlers during the PWI Years in 2003
- Southern States Championship Wrestling
  - SSCW Heavyweight Championship (1 time)
- Other titles
  - ASW Brass Knuckles Championship (1 time)
