= Chokeslam =

Type of body slam used in professional wrestling

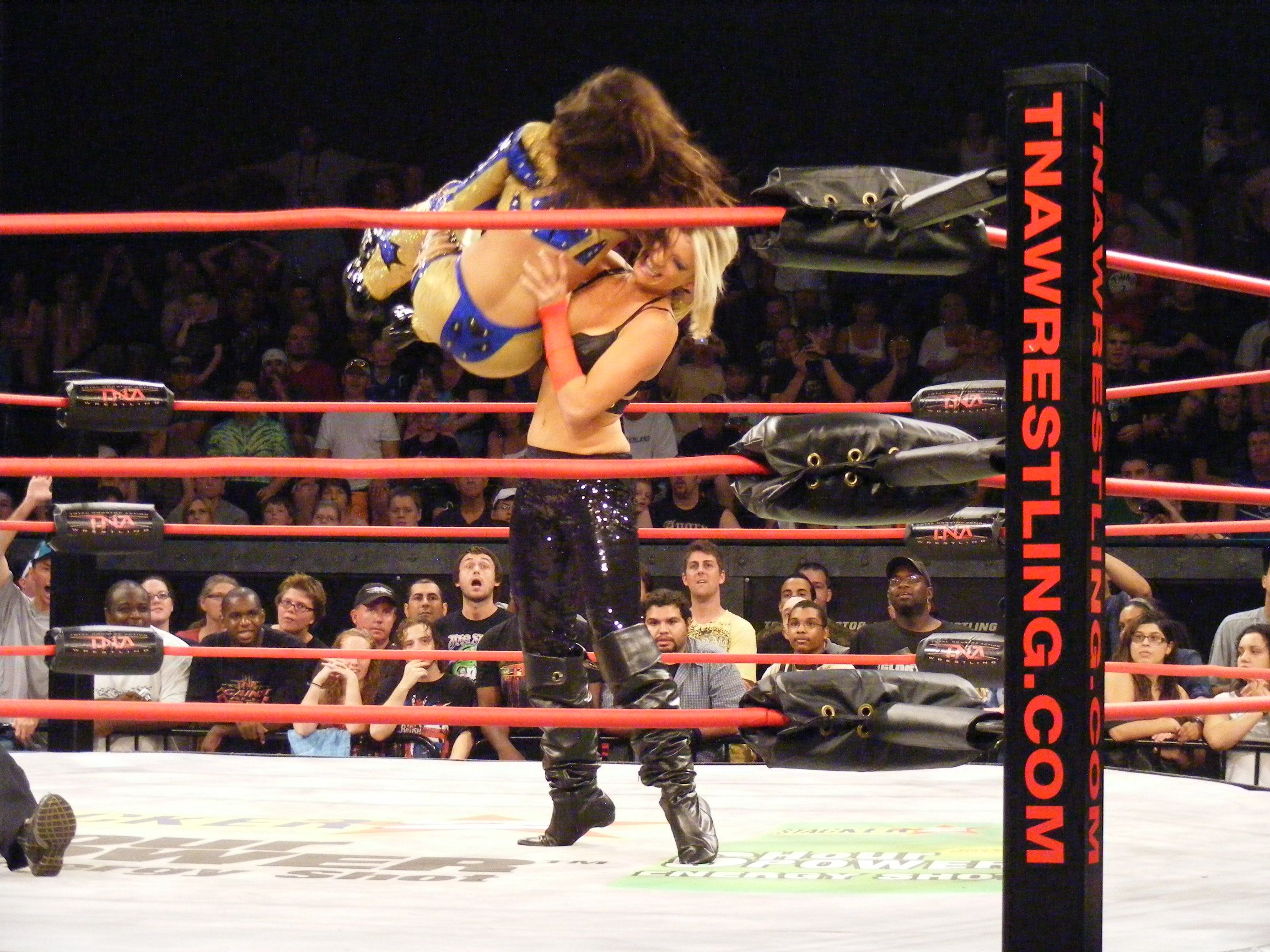
Lacey Von Erich performs a chokeslam on Sarita.

A chokeslam is a type of body slam in professional wrestling, in which a wrestler grasps an opponent's neck, lifts them up, and slams them to the mat. It is common in televised wrestling because it is simple and relatively safe, yet looks powerful on camera. The chokeslam is typically used as a finisher by large wrestlers. This maneuver can be more damaging if the victim is slammed into an object, such as a table, steel chair, or dustbin.

The most common variety of chokeslam is performed with a single-handed choke. The wrestler places their free hand behind the opponent's back or hooks the trunks to help turn them horizontally for the throw. Although a chokeslam begins with a "choke", it is not usually considered to be an illegal move. The single arm choke that normally precedes a chokeslam is known as a goozle.

The invention of the chokeslam is often incorrectly credited to Paul Heyman for use by the wrestler 911, although it was already in use by Sid Vicious at least as early as 1991 as well as AJPW wrestler Akira Taue since 1992 under the name nodowa otoshi ("choke drop/slam"). It is often used by large, powerful wrestlers such as The Undertaker, Kane, Big Show, Abyss, The Great Khali, Vader and Braun Strowman. This is because a larger, taller wrestler will be able to deliver a much higher, more impressive chokeslam than most smaller wrestlers. Their height and/or larger frames can also give them extra time to correct a botch if something goes wrong. However, some smaller wrestlers and even female performers have used the chokeslam, including Lacey Von Erich and The Hurricane, among others.

== Variations ==
=== Back suplex chokeslam ===
In this elevated chokeslam, innovated by Akira Taue, the wrestler stands behind the opponent, puts their head under one of the opponent's arms, and lifts them onto their shoulder. The wrestler then pushes the opponent upwards, turns 180°, and grabs hold of the falling enemy's throat, driving them down to the mat back first.

=== Fireman's carry chokeslam ===
In this chokeslam variant, a wrestler has their opponent held in a Fireman's Carry position. After this, they then transition into a chokeslam. This move is sometimes used by large superstars, but is occasionally used by some smaller superstars. Shane Haste/Shane Thorne has used this move as a finisher during his time in NOAH and NJPW, calling this move "Bomb Valley Death".

=== Inverted powerslam chokeslam ===
Like the vertical suplex chokeslam, but in this variant, the attacking wrestler puts the opponent in a powerbomb position and lifts them up in an inverted powerbomb. The wrestler moves their arm from around the opponent's neck, grabbing hold of their throat. The wrestler then slams the opponent down to the mat back first.

=== Iron Claw slam ===
This move is performed in the same style as a chokeslam, but instead the wrestler grabs the opponent with a clawhold. Erick Rowan used this move as a finisher and Lars Sullivan uses it as a signature. NJPW's Great-O-Khan currently uses this as the Eliminator while also applying a wrist-clutch sometimes for extra leverage.

=== Leg trap chokeslam ===
Also known as a leg hook chokeslam, or the Sky High Chokeslam, as dubbed by Vader, the attacker starts out by lifting the opponent's left or right leg off the ground and tucks it under or hooks it over their arm while using their free hand to grab the opponent's neck. Then, the attacker lifts the opponent into the air and slams the opponent down to the mat. The move can also be used as a reversal from when the opponent tries some form of kick only to have the attacker catch and hold on to the leg, setting up the move from there. A sitting version and a kneeling version are also possible.

=== One-handed chokeslam ===
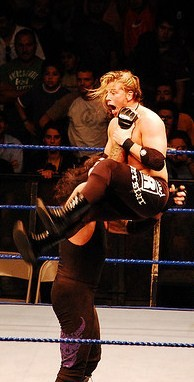
The Undertaker performing a one-handed chokeslam on Curt Hawkins

A very common variation, usually performed by a larger wrestler to a smaller one, this move sees the usual execution of the chokeslam done with just one hand lifted from the throat without the support of the other hand that usually goes on the back. Sid Vicious popularized the move in the early 1990s, including his WWF debut in 1991.Big Show, Kane, and The Undertaker frequently perform this, and A. J. Francis also uses this move as his finisher, which he calls the Down Payment. Big Show invented the kneeling chokeslam during his time in WCW under the name The Giant from 1995-1999.

=== Reverse chokeslam ===
This variation sees the wrestler stand behind the opponent, slightly to their side, then lift them up by their throat with both hands before releasing their grip on the front of the opponent's neck and slamming them face-first.

=== Reverse impact chokeslam ===
In this variation the attacking wrestler grabs the opponent's throat with one hand and grabs the opponent's abdomen with their free hand, then lifts the opponent over their head and slams the opponent similarly to a vertical suplex chokeslam.

=== Sitout chokeslam ===
This variation of a chokeslam is similar to an ordinary chokeslam, however, instead of the wrestler remaining standing, the wrestler falls into a seated position while forcing the opponent back-first into the mat. Damian Priest uses this move as his signature, and later finishing, move, calling it South of Heaven. Major League Wrestling (MLW) wrestler Donovan Dijak also uses this move as his signature move, calling it High Justice.

=== Two-handed chokeslam ===
This move sees a wrestler first grasp an opponent's neck with both hands, then lift them up and choke them before throwing the opponent back down to the mat, usually after choking out the opponent. A falling version of this move can see the attacking wrestler fall forward to the mat while keeping their arms extended, but will more often see the wrestler fall into a seated position or a kneeling position. It's mainly used by The Great Khali and Omos as the Jackknife Chokebomb.

=== Chokebomb ===
Also known as a sitout two-handed chokeslam and a choke driver. The most common move referred to as a chokebomb sees an attacking wrestler grasps an opponent's neck with both hands and then lift them up into the air. From here the attacking wrestler would throw the opponent back down to the mat while falling to a seated position. This would see the opponent land in a position where their legs are wrapped around the wrestler with their back and shoulders on the mat. This allows the attacking wrestler to lean forward and place both their arms on the opponent for a pinfall attempt. A falling version exists, and usually ends with the attacking wrestler pinning the opponent immediately while still holding the throat after the move has already been executed. It was used by Albert, former wrestler Dabba-Kato, The Wifebeater/Matt Martini and Tara.

=== Vertical suplex chokeslam ===
In this elevated chokeslam, innovated by Akira Taue, the wrestler applies a front facelock to the opponent and wraps their arm over the opponent's neck or body. The wrestler then lifts the opponent upside down, as in a vertical suplex. The wrestler moves their arm from around the opponent's neck, grabbing hold of their throat. The wrestler then slams the opponent down to the mat back first.
