= Johnny Grunge =

American professional wrestler (1966–2006)

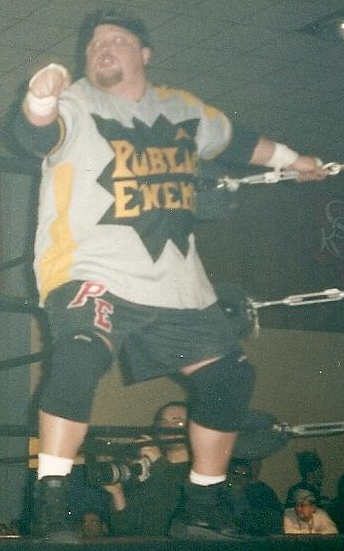
- Grunge in 2002

Personal information
- Born: Michael Lynn Durham; July 10, 1966 Sulphur, Louisiana, U.S.
- Died: February 16, 2006 (aged 39) Peachtree City, Georgia, U.S.

Professional wrestling career
- Ring name(s): Johnny Grunge; Johnny Rotten
- Billed height: 6 ft 3 in (191 cm)
- Billed weight: 260 lb (118 kg)
- Billed from: Compton, California
- Debut: 1987

Michael Lynn Durham (July 10, 1966 – February 16, 2006) was an American professional wrestler, better known by his ring name, Johnny Grunge. He is known for his appearances with Eastern/Extreme Championship Wrestling, World Championship Wrestling and the World Wrestling Federation as one-half of the tag team The Public Enemy with Rocco Rock. In the course of his career, Grunge held championships such as the ECW World Tag Team Championship and WCW World Tag Team Championship.

== Professional wrestling career ==
=== Early career (1987–1993) ===
Grunge made his professional wrestling debut in 1987. In 1993 in Woodbridge, New Jersey, Grunge formed a tag team in the UWF with Rocco Rock known as The Public Enemy. They had faced one another in Austria c. 1991, with Grunge (using the name "Johnny Rotten") losing to Rock (masked and using the name "Cheetah Kid").

=== Eastern/Extreme Championship Wrestling (1993–1996) ===
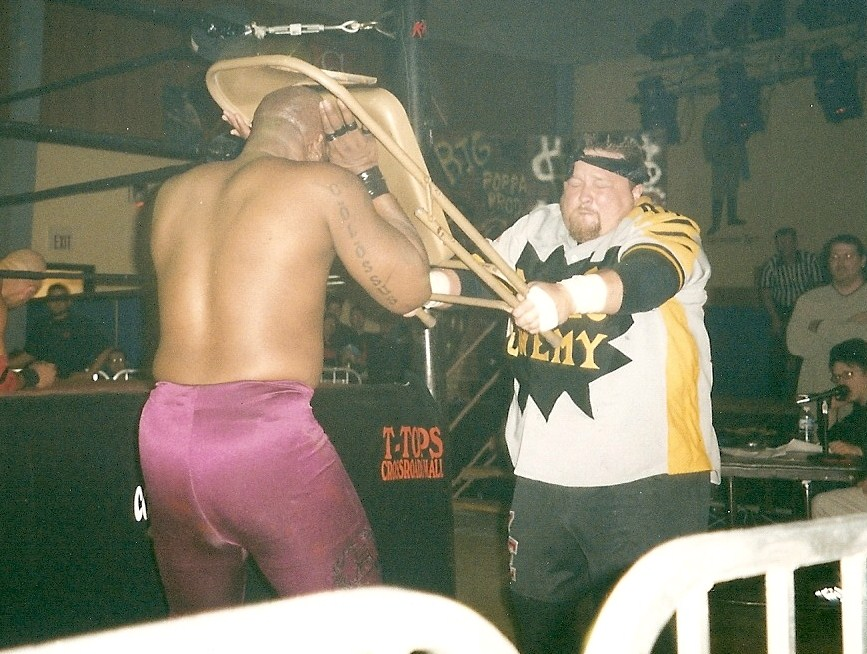
Grunge delivering a chair shot

In 1993, The Public Enemy joined Eastern Championship Wrestling, a Philadelphia, Pennsylvania-based promotion soon to be renamed Extreme Championship Wrestling. Between March 6, 1994 and October 28, 1995, The Public Enemy held the ECW Tag Team Championship on four occasions. While in ECW, they were involved in two infamous incidents - the first when the ECW audience hurled folding chairs into the ring until The Public Enemy (both "unconscious") were submerged, and the second when the ECW audience invaded the ring to celebrate with The Public Enemy, with the ring collapsing as a result of the additional weight. They were known for their hardcore wrestling style and usage of tables, a gimmick that was later adopted by the Dudley Boyz. The Public Enemy's wrestling style was referenced in Weezer's song "El Scorcho"; the line "watchin' Grunge legdrop New Jack through a press table" was derived from a caption for a photograph of Grunge fighting wrestler New Jack that was published in Pro Wrestling Illustrated.

=== World Championship Wrestling (1996–1998) ===
In 1996, The Public Enemy joined the Atlanta, Georgia based World Championship Wrestling promotion. They debuted on January 15, 1996, defeating The American Males. On September 23, 1996 in Birmingham, Alabama, The Public Enemy defeated Harlem Heat to win the WCW World Tag Team Championship, but Harlem Heat regained the titles on October 1, 1996 in Canton, Ohio.

=== World Wrestling Federation, return to ECW and return to WCW (1999) ===
The Public Enemy left WCW in September 1998, and briefly made appearances for ECW before joining the World Wrestling Federation. Both men made their debut on the February 22, 1999 episode of Raw is War, but were released from the WWF two months later. They had previously performed in the company at Survivor Series 1995 facing The Smoking Gunns. On July 18 at Bash at the Beach 1999, The Public Enemy returned to WCW and took part in the "Junkyard Invitational".

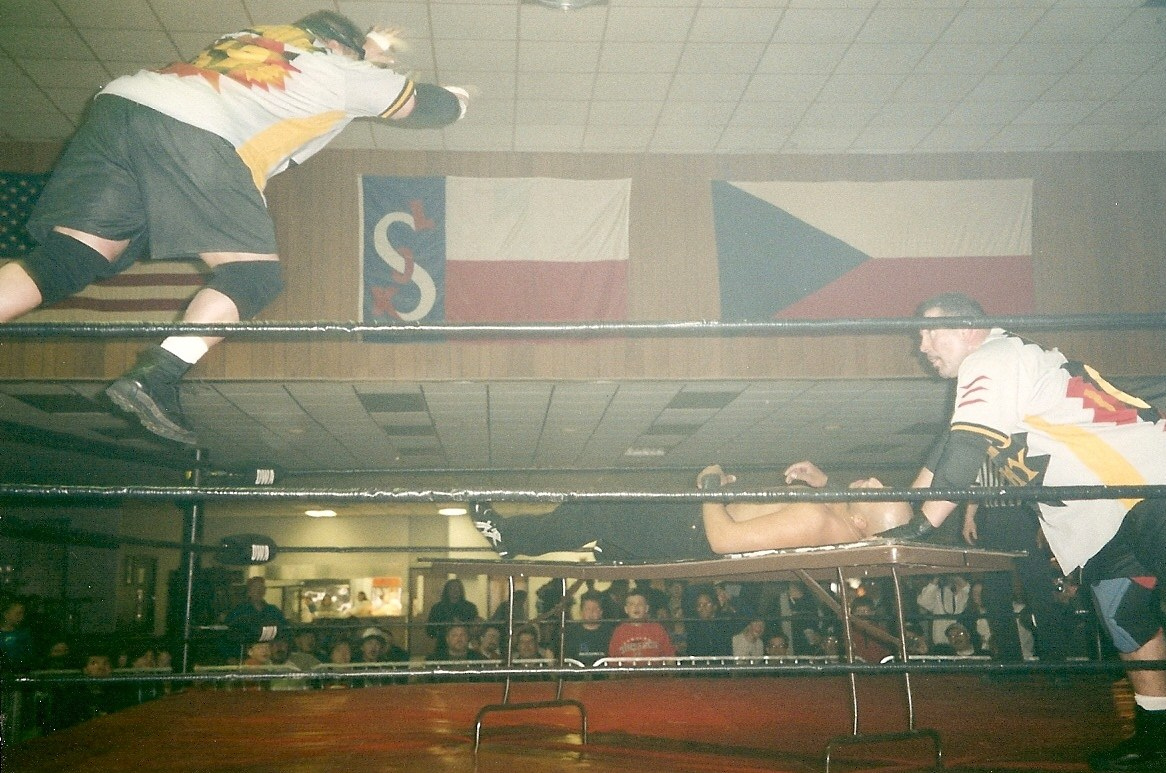
The Public Enemy performing a double team maneuver with a table

=== Later career (1999–2006) ===
They then returned to the independent circuit, making appearances with the X Wrestling Federation as The South Philly Posse, where they were managed by Jasmin St. Claire. In the early 2000s, Public Enemy performed for the short-lived i-Generation Superstars of Wrestling among other independent promotions. The team won various independent tag team titles. Following the death of Rocco Rock in 2002, Grunge teamed with his kayfabe brother Joey Grunge as The New Public Enemy throughout August 2003. He also made appearances with Pro-Pain Pro Wrestling (3PW) until his last match in 2004. He participated in a memorial segment for deceased ECW wrestlers at Hardcore Homecoming on June 10, 2005, and at the end of that year, Grunge was preparing for a comeback. His cousin, Jason Ray, who wrestled for Big Japan Wrestling, helped book him for BJW's upcoming spring tour.

== Personal life ==
Grunge was a neighbor of Chris Benoit and helped Benoit cope with Eddie Guerrero's death in November 2005.

Grunge died on February 16, 2006, in his residence in Peachtree City, Georgia, as a result of sleep apnea complications, which was most likely caused by a coronary artery blockage due to obesity. He was 39 years old.

Other reports say he was visiting a friend at the time of his death where he was unable to breathe. He was morbidly obese and had ingested a huge quantity of Soma pills that were prescribed by doctor Phil Astin.

== Championships and accomplishments ==
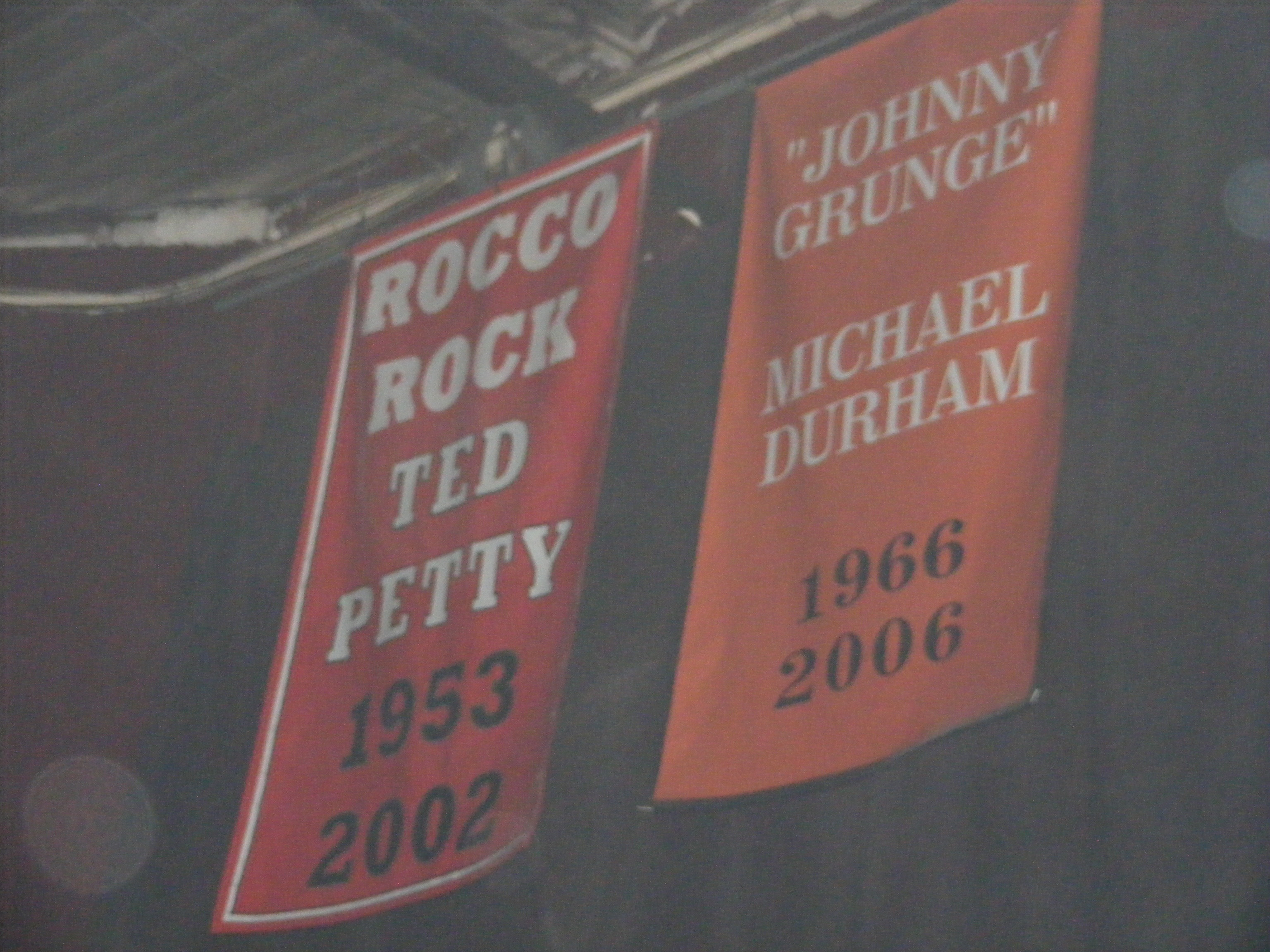
Grunge's Hardcore Hall of Fame banner in the former ECW Arena

- Cauliflower Alley Club
  - Other honoree (1995)
- Eastern Championship Wrestling / Extreme Championship Wrestling
  - ECW World Tag Team Championship (4 times) – with Rocco Rock
- Hardcore Hall of Fame
  - Class of 2007
- i-Generation Superstars of Wrestling
  - i-Generation Tag Team Championship (2 times) – with Rocco Rock
- International World Class Championship Wrestling
  - IWCCW Tag Team Championship (2 times) – with Equalizer Zip
- Main Event Championship Wrestling
  - MECW Tag Team Championship (1 time) – with Rocco Rock
- National Wrestling Alliance
  - NWA World Tag Team Championship (1 time) – with Rocco Rock
- NWA New Jersey
  - NWA United States Tag Team Championship (1 time) – with Rocco Rock
- New England Pro Wrestling Hall of Fame
  - Class of 2010
- New-Wave Championship Wrestling
  - NWCW Tag Team Championship (1 time) – with Rocco Rock
- Pro Wrestling Illustrated
  - Ranked No. 465 of the 500 best singles wrestlers of the PWI Years in 2003
- Superstars of Wrestling
  - SOW Tag Team Championship (2 times) – with Rocco Rock
- Turnbuckle Championship Wrestling
  - TCW Tag Team Championship (1 time) – with Rocco Rock
- Ultra Championship Wrestling
  - UCW Tag Team Championship (2 times) – with Jason Ray
- Universal Wrestling Alliance

- UWA Tag Team Championship (1 time) - with Rocco Rock

- World Championship Wrestling
  - WCW World Tag Team Championship (1 time) – with Rocco Rock
- Other Accomplishments
  - IPW Tag Team Championship (1 time) – with Rocco Rock
  - MCW Tag Team Championship (1 time) – with Rocco Rock
  - Hardcore Hall of Fame (2007)

== See also ==
- List of premature professional wrestling deaths
