= UltraClash (1993) =

1993 Eastern Championship Wrestling supercard event

- The ECW Arena.
- Promotion: Eastern Championship Wrestling
- Date: September 18, 1993
- City: Philadelphia, Pennsylvania, United States
- Venue: ECW Arena
- Attendance: 1,131

Event chronology
← Previous; Super Summer Sizzler Spectacular	Next → NWA Bloodfest

UltraClash chronology
← Previous; First	Next → 1998

UltraClash was the first UltraClash professional wrestling supercard event produced by the American professional wrestling promotion Eastern Championship Wrestling (ECW). The event took place at the ECW Arena in Philadelphia, Pennsylvania in the United States on September 18, 1993. It was the first ECW event to be booked by Paul Heyman. The event featured the debuts of Ian Rotten, the Public Enemy and commentator Joey Styles.

== Event ==
In the opening match, the debuting Ian Rotten teamed with Jason Knight to face the debuting tag team the Public Enemy (Johnny Grunge and Rocco Rock). The match ended when the Public Enemy hit a Drive-By on Rotten, enabling Rock to pin him. Following the match, the Public Enemy beat down Rotten.

In the second match, Tony Stetson defended the Pennsylvania Heavyweight Championship against Tommy Cairo. The match ended when Stetson's manager Hunter Q. Robbins III distracted referee Jim Molineaux, enabling Stetson to hit Cairo with the title belt behind the Molineaux's back and pin him to retain the title.

The third bout saw Super Destroyer #1 face his former tag team partner Super Destroyer #2 in a mask vs. mask match. Super Destroyer #1 won the match by pinfall after performing a senton on Super Destroyer #2, then unmasked him. Following the match, the Dark Patriot came to the ring and gave Super Destroyer #1 a chair shot. The Dark Patriot and Super Destroyer #2 then performed a spike piledriver on Super Destroyer #1, drawing out J.T. Smith to defend Super Destroyer #1.

The fourth bout was an impromptu scaffold match between J.T. Smith and the Dark Patriot. The match ended when the Dark Patriot threw powder in Smith, then threw him from the scaffold onto the mat for the win. Following the match, the Dark Patriot continued to attack Smith.

Other on-screen personnel
Role:	Name:
Commentator	Joey Styles
Referee	John Finegan
Referee	Jim Molineaux

The fifth bout saw Stan Hansen and Terry Funk face Abdullah the Butcher and Kevin Sullivan in a bunkhouse match. The match ended when Eddie Gilbert attacked Funk while he performed a spinning toe hold on Sullivan, resulting in Sullivan and Abdullah being disqualified. After the match, the Dark Patriot came to the ring and fought Hansen, while Sullivan attacked Abdullah. Following the match, Gilbert gave a promo announcing his departure from ECW.

The sixth bout was an intergender battle royal. Sensational Sherri and Angel worked together to eliminate Jay Sulli, Don E. Allen, and Hunter Q. Robbins III from the match while Tigra sat on the turnbuckle. Sherri then turned on Angel and ripped off her wig. Eddie Gilbert then came to ringside promoting Sherri to jump over the top rope to attack him, thus eliminating herself. The match ended when Tigra threw Angel out of the ring as she was distracted by Gilbert at ringside.

In the seventh bout, Sal Bellomo competed against Sir Richard Michaels in a strap match. Before the match, Bellomo called out Sensational Sherri to back him up as Michaels had Hunter Q. Robbins III in his corner. The match ended when Michaels missed a diving splash on Bellomo, who delivered a Pizza Splash to Michael and then pinned him. After the match, Bellomo whipped Michaels with the strap until Rockin' Rebel returned from his suspension and gave Bellomo a chair shot.

The eighth bout saw Shane Douglas defend the ECW Heavyweight Championship against the Sandman. The end of the match saw the Sandman give Douglas a low blow followed by a diving crossbody, only for Douglas to reverse the crossbody and pin The Sandman to retain his title.

The main event was a baseball bat match pitting the Headhunters against Crash the Terminator and Miguelito Pérez. The match ended when one of the Headhunters performed a moonsault on Crash and then pinned him. Following the match, the four men continued to brawl.

== Reception ==
Wrestling Recaps staff gave mixed reviews on the event for being only an average event by writing "The scaffold match and main event are worth checking out but the rest is a pass. I’m in the middle on this one as it is an important show (see below) but really only had two matches worth seeing."

The Wrestling Revolution staff wrote "Overall, a terrible show, made even worse by a terrible crowd. If it wasn’t a weapon-shot or in the scaffold, they booed and called it “boring.” The main event was the only thing on this show even close to being worth seeing. Most of this show was boring and repetitive. It felt like everything was "eight minute match, dirty/DQ finish, brawl afterwards." I believe that the squash at the beginning and Douglas vs. Sandman were the only matches on this show that didn't have brawls after them. Not a good start for the Paul Heyman Era in ECW. Thankfully, it eventually got a lot better."

Mike Campbell of 411Mania gave a score of 5, stating "It's fun at times, especially the two tag matches, but this is not a good show in the least."

== Results ==
No.	Results	Stipulations	Times
1	The Public Enemy (Johnny Grunge and Rocco Rock) defeated Ian Rotten and Jason Knight by pinfall	Tag team match	4:38
2	Tony Stetson (c) (with Hunter Q. Robbins III) defeated Tommy Cairo by pinfall	Singles match for the ECW Pennsylvania Championship	7:30
3	Super Destroyer #1 defeated Super Destroyer #2 by pinfall	Mask vs. mask match	6:25
4	The Dark Patriot defeated J.T. Smith	Scaffold match	6:32
5	Terry Funk and Stan Hansen defeated Kevin Sullivan and Abdullah the Butcher by disqualification	Bunkhouse match	7:30
6	Tigra defeated Angel, Don E. Allen, Hunter Q. Robbins III, Jay Sulli, and Sensational Sherri	Battle royal	3:46
7	Sal Bellomo (with Sensational Sherri) defeated Sir Richard Michaels (with Hunter Q. Robbins III) by pinfall	Strap match	7:18
8	Shane Douglas (c) defeated the Sandman by pinfall	Singles match for the ECW Heavyweight Championship	8:15
9	The Headhunters (Headhunter A and Headhunter B) defeated Crash the Terminator and Miguelito Pérez by pinfall	Baseball bat match	8:59
(c) / – the champion(s) heading into the match
