= Salvatore Bellomo =

Belgian professional wrestler (1951–2019)

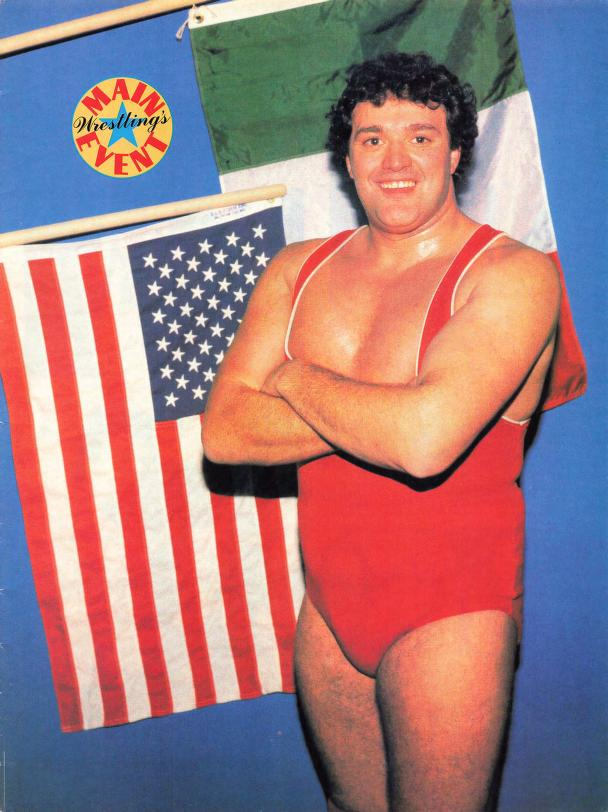
- Bellomo in 1983

Personal information
- Born: Salvatore Martino; June 18, 1951 Brussels, Belgium
- Died: February 9, 2019 (aged 67)

Professional wrestling career
- Ring name(s): Adonis Romano; Centurion Marsella; Salvatore (Sal) Bellomo; Salvatore (Sal) Martino; Super Destroyer #3; Tino Bellomo; Tino Salvadore
- Billed height: 6 ft 2 in (188 cm)
- Billed weight: 290 lb (132 kg)
- Billed from: Sicily, Italy
- Trained by: Nino
- Debut: 1973
- Retired: 2018

Salvatore Martino (June 18, 1951 – February 9, 2019) was a Belgian professional wrestler. His career spanned over 40 years. He is perhaps best known for his appearances in the United States with the World Wrestling Federation in the 1980s and with Eastern Championship Wrestling in the 1990s under the ring name Salvatore Bellomo.

== Professional wrestling career ==
=== Early career (1973–1975) ===
Martino was trained to wrestle by Nino. He debuted in his native Belgium in the early-1970s, wrestling at carnivals. In 1973, he toured the United Kingdom as "Tino Salvadore", losing to Brian Maxine in the Royal Albert Hall in London and appearing on World of Sport defeating "Judo" Tug Wilson. In February 1975, he began wrestling in Guadalajara and Mexico City in Mexico with Empresa Mexicana de Lucha Libre as "Adonis Romano", primarily appearing in six-man tag team matches.

=== Germany and Austria (1975-1981) ===
In August 1975, he returned to Europe. He spent the next two years wrestling in Austria and Germany before relocating to Canada in late-1977. Bellomo continued to visit Austria and Germany in between times - videos exist of his matches at the 1980 and 1981 Hanover tournaments.

=== Stampede Wrestling; NWA All-Star Wrestling (1977–1980) ===
In December 1977, Bellomo began wrestling in Canada, debuting in the Calgary, Alberta, Canada-based Stampede Wrestling promotion. In March 1978, he left Stampede Wrestling to join the Vancouver, British Columbia–based promotion NWA All-Star Wrestling, where he adopted the ring name "Salvatore Martino" (sometimes shortened to "Sal Martino"). In October 1978, Bellomo and Mike Sharpe defeated the Iron Sheik and the Texas Outlaw to win the NWA Canadian Tag Team Championship. They lost the titles to Igor Volkoff and UFO in January 1979. In February 1979, Bellomo and Bill Cody won the titles from Volkoff and UFO. Bellomo's second reign lasted until March 1979, when he and Joe Ventura (substituting for Cody) lost to Igor Volkoff and The Mongol. That same month, Bellomo defeated Gene Kiniski to win the vacant NWA Pacific Coast Heavyweight Championship. His reign lasted until May 1979, when he lost to Jean Louie. Bellomo continued to appear with NWA All-Star Wrestling until August 1980.

=== International Wrestling Enterprise (1978) ===
In mid-1978, Bellomo toured Japan with the Tokyo-based International Wrestling Enterprise promotion as part of its Big Summer Series. He wrestled a total of 24 matches for the promotion, including a 20-minute time limit draw with Jiro Inazuma, a double count out with Mr. Hito, a steel cage match against Rusher Kimura, and several matches against Animal Hamaguchi.

=== Pacific Northwest Wrestling (1979–1980) ===
In June 1979, Bellomo began appearing with the Portland, Oregon, United States–based promotion Pacific Northwest Wrestling as "Sal Martino". He appeared with the promotion until August 1980.

=== NWA Hollywood Wrestling (1981) ===
In January 1981, Bellomo began wrestling for the Los Angeles, California, United States–based NWA Hollywood Wrestling promotion under his real name. He formed a tag team with Víctor Rivera. In May 1981, Bellomo and Rivera defeated the Davidson Brothers for the NWA Americas Tag Team Championship. They lost the titles back to the Davidson Brothers later that year. Bellomo continued to wrestle for NWA Hollywood Wrestling until August 1981, after which he resumed wrestling in Germany.

=== World Wrestling Federation (1982–1987) ===
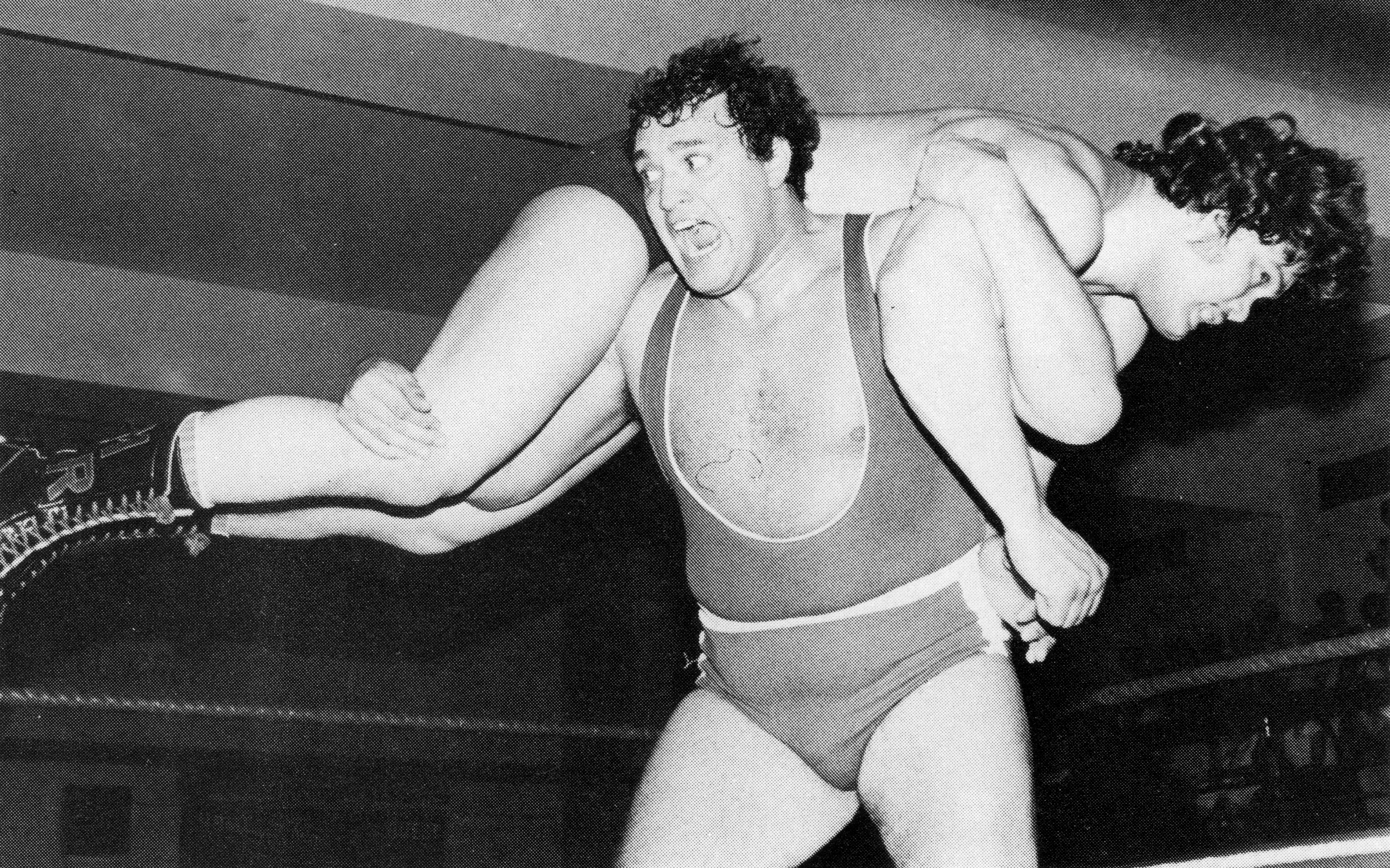
Bellomo with an airplane spin on Mac Rivera in a 1982 match

In 1982, Bellomo was signed by the United States–based World Wrestling Federation after Peter Maivia advised him to audition as the WWF was looking for a new babyface Italian wrestler to replace Bruno Sammartino. Wrestling under his real name, Bellomo made his televised in-ring debut on the June 28, 1982, episode of WWF on MSG Network, defeating Baron Mikel Scicluna in Madison Square Garden in New York City, New York. He went on to appear regularly on WWF Championship Wrestling and WWF on PRISM Network, going over opponents such as Johnny Rodz, Swede Hanson, Mr. Fuji, and Mr. Saito, establishing him as an "undercard hero".

In mid-1983, Bellomo and a series of tag team partners unsuccessfully challenging The Wild Samoans for the WWF World Tag Team Championships. In late-1983 and early-1984, he unsuccessfully challenged both WWF Champion The Iron Sheik and WWF Intercontinental Champion Don Muraco. By mid-1984, Bellomo was winning less regularly, putting over opponents such as David Schultz, Greg Valentine, Big John Studd, Paul Orndorff, and Pat Patterson. On the second episode of Tuesday Night Titans in June 1984, Bellomo defeated Ron Shaw, then later gave a demonstration on boat building. In August 1984, he lost to former WWF Champion Bob Backlund in the Spectrum in Philadelphia, Pennsylvania, in what was Backlund's final match before leaving the WWF. In November 1984, he lost to manager Bobby "The Brain" Heenan in Madison Square Garden.

On December 10, 1984, Roddy Piper was scheduled to interview Junkyard Dog on his talk show, Piper's Pit. After Bellomo came to the ring instead of Junkyard Dog, Piper mocked him, quipping "I didn't order a pizza." Piper, Paul Orndorff, and Bob Orton then attacked Bellomo until Junkyard Dog came to his rescue.

By 1985, Bellomo was being used as a jobber, losing to opponents such as Brutus Beefcake, Jim Neidhart, and The Missing Link, as well as losing tag team matches to opponents such as The Dream Team and The Hart Foundation. At The War to Settle the Score in February 1985, he lost to Don Muraco. On the 34th episode of Tuesday Night Titans in May 1985, Bellomo defeated Frankie Williams and hosted a segment titled "Thatsa My Kitchen" featuring traditional Italian cooking. In September 1985, he took a leave of absence from the WWF, returning in August 1986. On the January 19, 1987, episode of WWF Prime Time Wrestling, he was interviewed by Jake "The Snake" Roberts on his talk show, The Snake Pit. He made his final appearance with the WWF in March 1987, losing to Brad Rheingans in the Nassau Coliseum in Uniondale, New York.

=== Catch Wrestling Association (1988–1992) ===
In October 1988 Bellomo wrestled a match in France against American opponent Commando, taped for and screened on French national TV station TF1's New Catch TV series. In December that year Bellomo began making appearances for the Catch Wrestling Association in Austria and Germany. He was billed as "Tino Bellomo" for his first CWA match, reverting to his real name thereafter. Some time later Bellomo turned heel. Now considerably heavier than during his WWF run and sporting a full beard, he was billed as "Wildman" Sal Bellomo, adopting both a distinctive new ring attire resembling a Roman centurion and a more brawling-orientated wrestling style. During this period he also made further appearances appeared on New Catch - by now airing on satellite TV channel Eurosport - as well as S4C's Welsh language, Wales-filmed wrestling show Reslo, promoted by Orig Williams. In 1989, 1990, 1991, and 1992, he took part in the World Catch Cup tag team tournaments. In late-1992, he took part in the International Catch Cup. He made his final appearance with the CWA in December 1992.

=== Eastern Championship Wrestling (1992–1994, 1996) ===
In April 1992, Bellomo began appearing with the Philadelphia, Pennsylvania, United States–based promotion Eastern Championship Wrestling, approaching ECW promoter Tod Gordon as he was living in Philadelphia at the time. In his first match, he won a battle royal as part of a tournament to crown the inaugural ECW Heavyweight Champion. He went on to lose to Jimmy Snuka (who had won a separate battle royal) in the tournament final. In mid-1992, Bellomo began feuding with Tony Stetson, with Stetson winning a loser leaves town match in August 1992.

Bellomo returned in November 1992. In January 1993, he wrestled Kerry Von Erich (the "secret weapon" of Woman) to a double disqualification at the "Battle of the Belts" event. In March 1993, Bellomo appeared on the inaugural episode of ECW Hardcore TV, losing to Tommy Cairo in the first round of a tournament for the vacant ECW Television Championship. In April 1993, he unsuccessfully challenged The Sandman for the ECW Heavyweight Championship. In May 1993, he took part in a battle royal to crown the inaugural ECW Pennsylvania Champion that was won by Tommy Cairo. In June 1993, he wrestled at ECW's first supercard, the Super Summer Sizzler Spectacular, teaming with Super Destroyer #1 and Stevie Wonderful to defeat the Suicide Blondes and Hunter Q. Robbins III. In the same month, he had a brief rivalry with the Super Destroyers after he began impersonating them, calling himself "Super Destroyer #3". In August 1993, Bellomo and The Sandman entered a tournament for the vacant ECW Tag Team Championship, first defeating Sir Richard Michaels and Tony Stetson, then defeating Ivan Koloff and Vladimir Koloff, before losing to The Dark Patriot and Eddie Gilbert in the finals. A short feud between Bellomo and Sir Richard Michaels culminated in a strap match at UltraClash that was won by Bellomo. Bellomo went on to feud with Rockin' Rebel, defeating him in a chairs match at November to Remember by forfeit.

At The Night the Line Was Crossed in February 1994, Bellomo lost to Mr. Hughes. Bellomo continued to appear on ECW Hardcore TV until leaving ECW in May 1994.

Bellomo returned to Eastern Championship Wrestling - since renamed Extreme Championship Wrestling - in June 1996. At Hardcore Heaven that month, he joined the stable the Full Blooded Italians, accompanying them for their match against the Dudley Brothers. In September 1996 at When Worlds Collide II, Bellomo, J.T. Smith, and Little Guido unsuccessfully challenged the Gangstas for the ECW World Tag Team Championship. Bellomo left ECW once more later that year.

=== Late career (1994–2018) ===
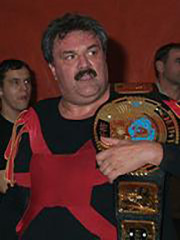
Bellomo in 2006.

After leaving ECW, Bellomo wrestled on the independent circuit until 2018. He continued to be active in the business up to his death, working as a trainer for the Belgian Wrestling School located in Terhagen and Flémalle (Belgium). He often tried to send his kids home with his trademarked expression of saying "Cha Cha!". Bellomo also ran the Belgian Catch Wrestling Federation. In April 2015, Bellomo sent several of his students to audition for Belgium's Got Talent; the students passed the auditions and wrestled live on Belgian television.

== Professional wrestling style and persona ==
Although he was born in Belgium, Bellomo was of Italian descent, and his professional wrestling persona reflected this. In the World Wrestling Federation, his character was that of an Italian immigrant who spoke broken English.

Bellomo originally wrestled in a technical style, with his signature moves including a "back dropkick", flying head scissors, and crossbody block. Later in his career, he adopted a brawling/powerhouse style, with his signature moves being the Pizza Splash (a big splash) and a mule kick.

== Death ==
Bellomo died from cancer on February 9, 2019, at the age of 67.

== Championships and accomplishments ==
- NWA All-Star Wrestling
  - NWA Canadian Tag Team Championship (2 times) - with Mike Sharpe (1 time) and Bill Cody (1 time)
  - NWA Pacific Coast Heavyweight Championship (1 time)
- NWA Hollywood Wrestling
  - NWA Americas Tag Team Championship (1 time) - with Víctor Rivera
- Pro Wrestling Illustrated
  - Ranked No. 276 of the 500 best singles wrestlers of the PWI 500 in 1992
- World Xtreme Wrestling
  - WXW Heavyweight Championship (1 time)
  - WXW Tag Team Championship (1 time) - with the Mad Russian
  - WXW Hall of Fame (Class of 2013)
