= The Night the Line Was Crossed =

1994 Extreme Championship Wrestling live event

- The ECW Arena
- Promotion: Eastern Championship Wrestling
- Date: February 5, 1994
- City: Philadelphia, Pennsylvania, US
- Venue: ECW Arena
- Attendance: c.1,000

Event chronology
← Previous; Holiday Hell	Next → Ultimate Jeopardy

The Night the Line Was Crossed was a professional wrestling live event produced by Eastern Championship Wrestling (ECW) on February 5, 1994. The event was held in the ECW Arena in Philadelphia, Pennsylvania in the United States.

Excerpts from The Night the Line Was Crossed (including the unabridged main event) aired on the syndicated television show ECW Hardcore TV, while the full event was released on VHS in 1994. It was made available for streaming on the WWE Network in 2020. The main event and the bout between Jimmy Snuka and Tommy Dreamer were both included on the compilation DVD ECW: Unreleased Vol. 1 released by WWE in 2012.

== Event ==
The commentator for The Night the Line Was Crossed was Joey Styles. The ring announcer was Bob Artese. The referees were Jim Molineaux and John Finnegan. The event was attended by approximately 1,000 people, selling out the ECW Arena.

In the opening match, which was not included on the VHS release, the previously unnamed 911 defeated Chad Austin by pinfall following a chokeslam.

The second match saw Mr. Hughes defeat Sal Bellomo by pinfall following a sidewalk slam in a short squash.

The third match was a double dog collar tag team match pitting the Sandman and Tommy Cairo against the Pitbull and Rockin' Rebel, with the Sandman chained to Rockin' Rebel and Cairo chained to the Pitbull. The match ended when Cairo delivered a belly-to-belly suplex to the Pitbull and pinned him, with the Sandman wrapping a chain around the Pitbull's legs to prevent him from kicking out.

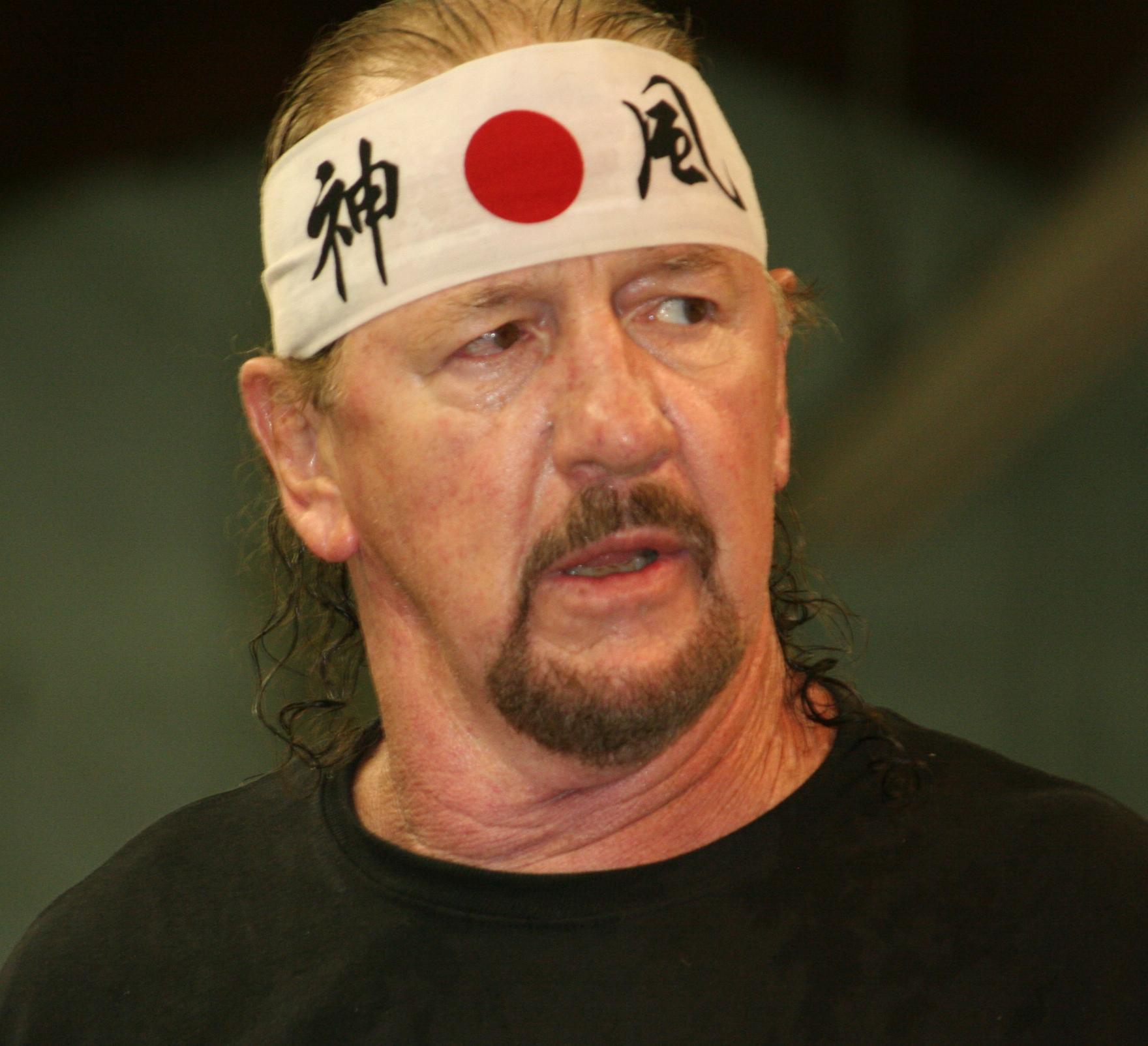
Terry Funk retained his ECW Heavyweight Championship in the main event of The Night the Line Was Crossed.

The fourth match was a "no rules" tag team match between the Public Enemy and the Bruise Brothers. The Public Enemy won the bout after Johnny Grunge hit one of the Bruise Brothers with a 2×4 then pinned him.

In the fifth match, Jimmy Snuka faced Tommy Dreamer. Towards the end of the match, Dreamer kicked out of Snuka's Superfly Splash to the shock of commentator Joey Styles. Snuka then gave Dreamer two more Superfly Splashes before pinning him with one hand. After the match, Snuka gave Dreamer yet another Superfly Splash - causing him to cough up blood - then gave a diving double axe handle to ECW president Tod Gordon after he attempted to intervene.

In the next match, Pat Tanaka and the Sheik faced Kevin Sullivan and the Tazmaniac. The match ended after the Sheik threw a fireball at the Tazmaniac, enabling Tanaka to pin him with a roll-up.

The penultimate match was a singles bout between J.T. Smith and Mike Awesome. Smith defeated Awesome in an upset after reversing the Awesome Bomb into a cradle. After the match, Awesome attacked the referee. He attempted to give the referee a diving splash, but the ring rope broke.

The main event was a three way dance for the ECW Heavyweight Championship, with the reigning champion, Terry Funk, defending his championship against Sabu and Shane Douglas. The match arose after Sabu lost the Championship to Funk due to interference from Douglas. The stipulation for the match was that Sabu and Shane Douglas would begin the match, with Funk joining after 15 minutes (or when one of the competitors had eliminated the other). The match was a "wild brawl" with interference from 911, the Bad Breed, Paul E. Dangerously, and Sherri Martel. After 60 minutes, the match was declared a time limit draw. The match received a standing ovation from the audience. Following the match, Douglas gave "a fiery interview, laced with shoot comments", then brawled with Funk.

== Response ==
"The first match that I recall ever feeling good about was The Night the Line Was Crossed. I remember coming back to the back and thinking to myself 'I don't know how we did it, but somehow that was a pretty damn good match'."
- Shane Douglas

The main event of The Night the Line Was Crossed has been attributed with making "wrestling fans around the country take notice of the happenings in South Philadelphia". Journalist Dave Meltzer noted "there are very few examples anyone can come up with of a one hour television show where a world title match would air in its entirety in North America". The main event stood out for both its length and the then-rarity of three way dances, with the match helping popularize them. ECW mainstay Tommy Dreamer described The Night the Line Was Crossed as "a turning point" for ECW, stating "you knew something special was here, and we started running more and more towns after that."

== Results ==
No.	Results	Stipulations	Times
1	911 defeated Chad Austin by pinfall	Singles match	—
2	Mr. Hughes (with Jason) defeated Sal Bellomo by pinfall	Singles match	3:17
3	The Sandman and Tommy Cairo defeated the Pitbull and Rockin' Rebel (with Jason) by pinfall	Dog collar match	4:59
4	The Public Enemy (Johnny Grunge and Rocco Rock) defeated the Bruise Brothers (Don Bruise and Ron Bruise) by pinfall	Tag team match	7:59
5	Jimmy Snuka (with Hunter Q. Robbins III) defeated Tommy Dreamer by pinfall	Singles match	10:15
6	Pat Tanaka and The Sheik defeated Kevin Sullivan and The Tazmaniac (with Woman) by pinfall	Tag team match	3:15
7	J.T. Smith defeated Mike Awesome by pinfall	Singles match	2:00
8	Terry Funk (c) vs. Sabu (with 911 and Paul E. Dangerously) vs. Shane Douglas (with Sherri Martel) ended in a time limit draw	Three way dance for the ECW Heavyweight Championship	60:00
(c) / – the champion(s) heading into the match
