= South Philly Jam =

1995 Extreme Championship Wrestling supercard event

- The ECW Arena.
- Promotion: Extreme Championship Wrestling
- Date: October 7, 1995 (aired October 10, 17, and 24, 1995)
- City: Philadelphia, Pennsylvania, US
- Venue: ECW Arena
- Attendance: 1,150

Event chronology
← Previous; Gangstas Paradise	Next → November to Remember

South Philly Jam was a professional wrestling live event produced by Extreme Championship Wrestling (ECW) on October 7, 1995. The event was held in the ECW Arena in Philadelphia, Pennsylvania in the United States.

Excerpts from South Philly Jam aired on episodes #129, #130, and #131 of the syndicated television show ECW Hardcore TV in October 1995. The two-out-of-three-falls match between Psicosis and Rey Misterio Jr. - which received a 4¾ star rating from the Wrestling Observer Newsletter - was featured on the 2011 compilation DVD Rey Mysterio: The Life of a Masked Man.

== Event ==
The event was attended by approximately 1,150 people.

The opening bout was a tag team match pitting Chad Austin and Tony Stetson against the Eliminators. The Eliminators won the bout via pinfall following Total Elimination.

The second bout was a singles match between Jason Knight and Taz, following on from Knight having pinned Taz in an upset at Gangstas Paradise the prior month. Taz won in a short squash using the Tazmission.

The third bout was a singles match between Cactus Jack and the debuting El Puerto Riqueño. Eschewing his usual brawling, Jack won the bout by pinfall using a roll-up after his ally Raven gave El Puerto Riqueño a DDT. Following the match, Jack and Raven attacked El Puerto Riqueño until Tommy Dreamer came to the ring, only to be put through a table with a diving elbow drop by Cactus Jack.

Following the third bout, Joey Styles interviewed "Superstar" Steve Austin, who had debuted in ECW at Gangstas Paradise the prior month. In the interview, Austin recounted his firing from World Championship Wrestling (WCW) and criticized the politics of WCW. Austin then criticized ECW, calling the ECW Arena "disgusting", and claimed that no-one could hold him back.

The fourth bout was a singles match between Dudley Dudley and Konnan. Konnan won the bout via pinfall following a Niagara Driver.

The fifth bout was a two-out-of-three-falls match between Psicosis and Rey Misterio Jr. in a rematch from Gangstas Paradise the prior month. Misterio Jr. won the first fall by pinfall using a huracánrana. Psicosis then won the second fall by pinfall following a tombstone piledriver. Psicosis then won the third fall and the match by pinning Misterio Jr. following a powerbomb and a chair-assisted corkscrew senton.

The sixth bout was a lumberjack match in which ECW World Tag Team Champions the Pitbulls defended their titles against Raven and Stevie Richards in a rematch from Gangstas Paradise the prior month, with 911 and Big Dick Dudley as the lumberjacks and Bill Alfonso and Tod Gordon as dual referees. Raven and Richards won the titles when Richards pinned Pitbull #2 after Cactus Jack interfered by giving Pitbull #2 a double arm DDT onto a chair. Following the match, Alfonso and Richards attacked Gordon.

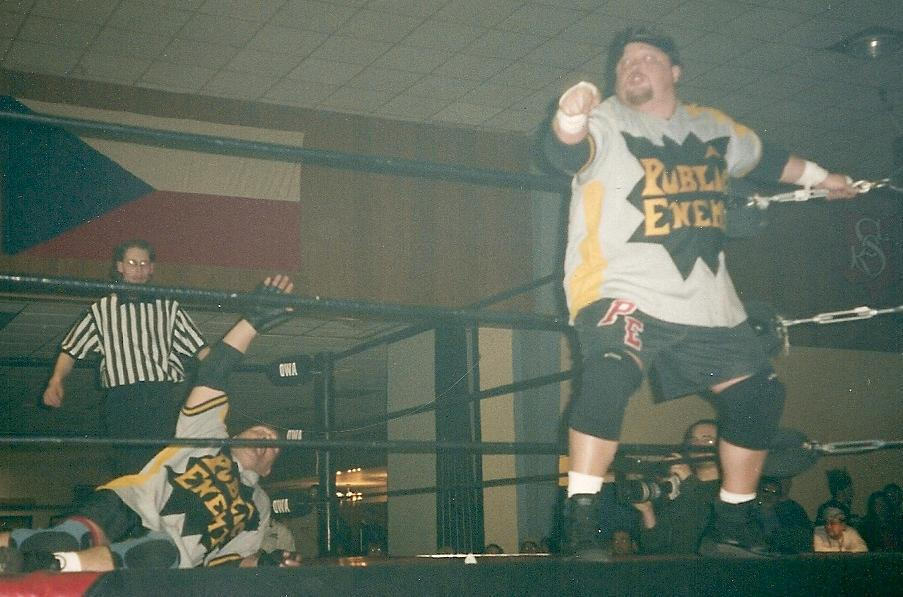
The Public Enemy won the ECW World Tag Team Championship at South Philly Jam.

The seventh bout saw ECW World Television Champion 2 Cold Scorpio defend his title against J. T. Smith in a singles match. Scorpio won the bout via pinfall following a Tumbleweed.

Following the seventh bout, Hack Meyers came to ringside, resulting in an impromptu match between him and Scorpio. Scorpio won the match by pinfall following a Diss That Don't Miss and a Drop da Bomb.

The ninth bout saw ECW World Heavyweight Champion the Sandman defend his title against Mikey Whipwreck in a singles match, following on from Whipwreck having pinned the Sandman at Gangstas Paradise the prior month. Before the match began, the Sandman was attacked by Steve Austin and then by Konnan. The Sandman won the bout via pinfall following a diving leg drop from the top of a ladder.

The main event was a three way dance in which Raven and Stevie Richards defended the ECW World Tag Team Championship against the Gangstas and the Public Enemy. The Gangstas were the first team eliminated. The Public Enemy went on to win the titles, with Rocco Rock pinning Richards following a moonsault through a burning table.

== Results ==
No.	Results	Stipulations
1	The Eliminators (John Kronus and Perry Saturn) defeated Chad Austin and Tony Stetson via pinfall	Tag team match
2	Taz defeated Jason Knight via submission	Singles match
3	Cactus Jack (with Raven) defeated El Puerto Riqueño by pinfall	Singles match
4	Konnan defeated Dudley Dudley by pinfall	Singles match
5	Psicosis defeated Rey Misterio Jr. by pinfall	Two-out-of-three-falls match
6	Raven and Stevie Richards defeated The Pitbulls (Pitbull #1 and Pitbull #2) (c) (with Francine) via pinfall	Lumberjack match for the ECW World Tag Team Championship
7	2 Cold Scorpio (c) defeated J. T. Smith by pinfall	Singles match for the ECW World Television Championship
8	2 Cold Scorpio (c) defeated Hack Meyers by pinfall	Singles match for the ECW World Television Championship
9	The Sandman (c) (with Woman) defeated Mikey Whipwreck by pinfall	Singles match for the ECW World Heavyweight Championship
10	The Public Enemy (Johnny Grunge and Rocco Rock) defeated the Gangstas (Mustafa and New Jack) and Raven and Stevie Richards (c) by pinfall	Three way dance for the ECW World Tag Team Championship
(c) / – the champion(s) heading into the match
