= Super Summer Sizzler Spectacular =

1993 Eastern Championship Wrestling live event

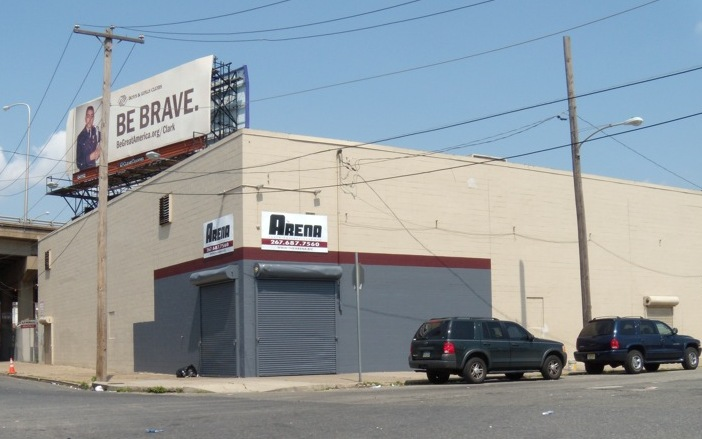
- The ECW Arena
- Promotion: NWA Eastern Championship Wrestling
- Date: June 19, 1993
- City: Philadelphia, Pennsylvania, US
- Venue: ECW Arena
- Attendance: 650

Event chronology
← Previous; Battle of the Belts	Next → UltraClash

The Super Summer Sizzler Spectacular was a professional wrestling live event produced by NWA Eastern Championship Wrestling (ECW) on June 19, 1993. The event was held in the ECW Arena in Philadelphia, Pennsylvania in the United States.

The Super Summer Sizzler Spectacular was ECW's first "supercard" and the first ECW event to be released on VHS. In 2020, it was added to the WWE Network.

== Event ==
The commentator for the Super Summer Sizzler Spectacular was Jay Sulli, with guest commentary from Paul E. Dangerously, Terry Funk, Joey Styles and Tod Gordon. The referees were Jim Molineaux, John Finnegan, and Kevin Christian. The event was attended by approximately 650 people.

The opening bout saw Don E. Allen wrestle Herve Renesto to a no contest. This match was not included on the VHS release.

In the first match to appear on the VHS release, ECW Television Champion Jimmy Snuka defended his championship in a bout with J.T. Smith, defeating him with the Superfly Splash.

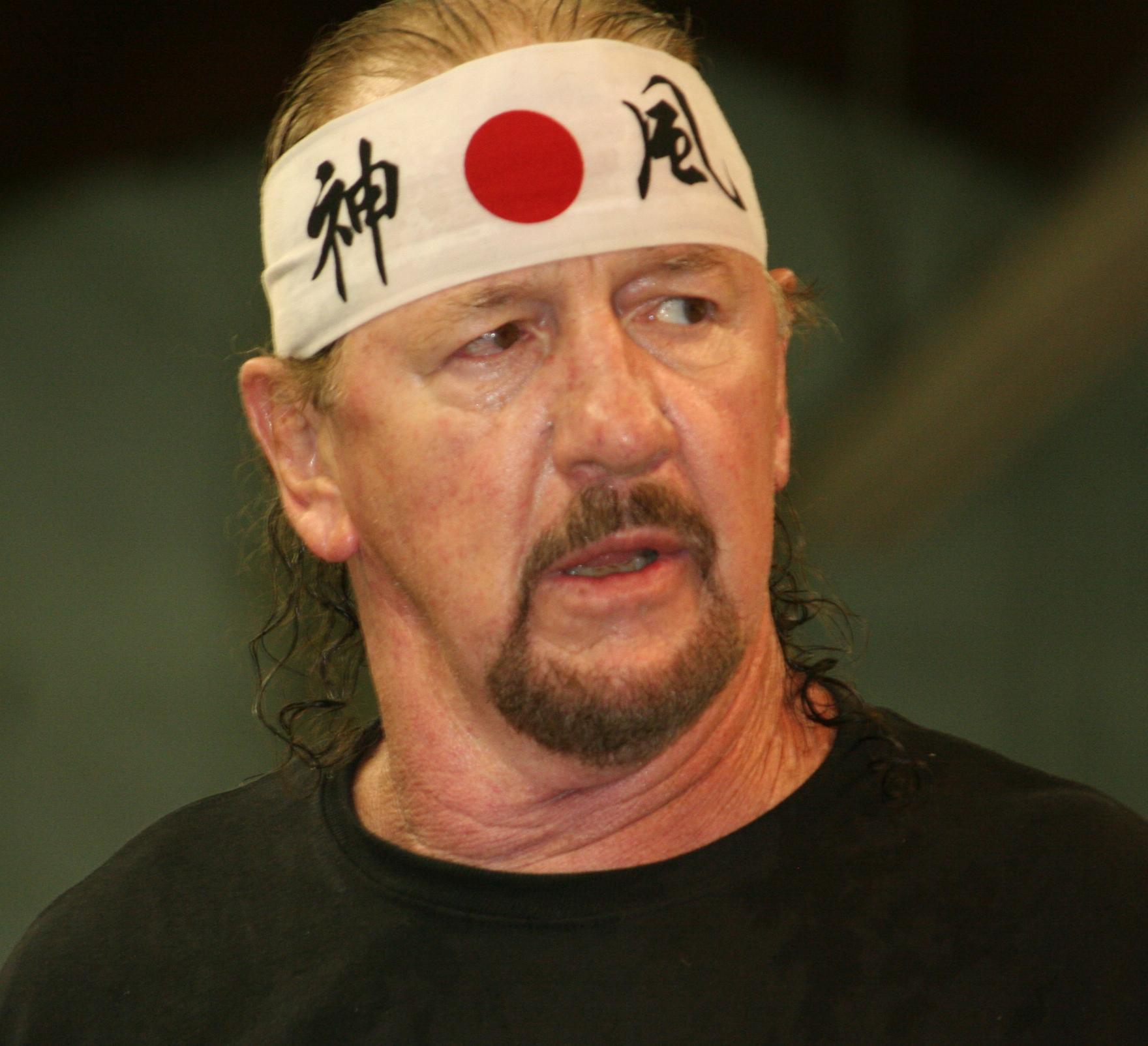
Terry Funk wrestled in the main event of the Super Summer Sizzler Spectacular.

In the third bout, former tag team partners Larry Winters and Tony Stetson faced one another in a first blood match. The match ended when Rockin' Rebel came to ringside and distracted Winters, enabling Stetson to hit him with a chain wrapped around his fist and draw blood.

In the fourth bout, Miss Peaches faced Terrible Tigra in a "catfight humiliation match", with the loser being the first woman to be stripped. After both women removed one another's t-shirts, Peaches - with assistance from the debuting Angel - won the match by tearing off Tigra's shorts. Following the match, Stetson and Rockin' Rebel attacked Peaches and Angel, stripping Angel topless before being driven off by Larry Winters and the Sandman.

In the fifth bout, Jimmy Snuka (accompanied by his manager, Paul E. Dangerously) defended his ECW Television Championship for a second time, this time against ECW Pennsylvania Champion Tommy Cairo. Snuka retained his championship after Dangerously tripped Cairo, enabling Snuka to pin him using a roll-up with his feet on the ring ropes.

In the sixth bout, Rockin' Rebel faced the Sandman in a "Philadelphia street fight", with Rockin' Rebel pinning the Sandman using a schoolboy after an unnamed Tammy Lynn Sytch entered the ring and momentarily blinded the Sandman with hair spray.

The seventh bout was scheduled to be between Dark Patriot and Dick Murdoch. Before the match, Dark Patriot's manager, Paul E. Dangerously, announced that he was unavailable and introduced the masked Dark Patriot II as his substitute. Murdoch went on to defeat Dark Patriot II with a roll-up.

The eighth bout was a six-man tag team match pitting Sal Bellomo, Super Destroyer #1, and Stevie Wonderful (substituting for Super Destroyer #2) against ECW Tag Team Champions the Suicide Blondes (Sir Jonathan Hotbody and Sir Richard Michaels) and Hunter Q. Robbins III. The match ended after Bellomo delivered a Pizza Splash to Michaels and pinned him.

The main event was a "Texas Chain Match Massacre" between "Hot Stuff" Eddie Gilbert (accompanied by Paul E. Dangerously) and Terry Funk, with the winner to be named "King of Philadelphia". The match saw the two competitors chained together at the wrist, with the winner being the first man to touch all four turnbuckles consecutively. Towards the end of the match, Funk succeeded in touching all four turnbuckles, but was not named as winner by referee Kevin Christian. Subsequently, Gilbert hit Funk with a chair and then gave him a piledriver on the chair, enabling him to touch all four corners and win. After the match, Dangerously revealed that Kevin Christian was in fact "Freddie Gilbert", Eddie Gilbert's brother, and had cheated on his behalf. Following the match, Funk and ECW commissioner Tod Gordon brawled with Gilbert and Dangerously, after which Funk gave Gordon the "King of Philadelphia" crown and cut a promo praising ECW.

== Results ==
No.	Results	Stipulations	Times
1	Herve Renesto vs. Don E. Allen ended in a no contest	Singles match	1:30
2	Jimmy Snuka (c) defeated J.T. Smith by pinfall	Singles match for the ECW Television Championship	5:57
3	Tony Stetson defeated Larry Winters by referee stoppage	First blood match	5:34
4	Miss Peaches defeated Terrible Tigra by stripping her	"Catfight humiliation match"	3:23
5	Jimmy Snuka (c) (with Paul E. Dangerously) defeated Tommy Cairo by pinfall	Singles match for the ECW Television Championship	6:06
6	Rockin' Rebel defeated the Sandman by pinfall	Philadelphia street fight	5:11
7	Dick Murdoch defeated Dark Patriot II (with Paul E. Dangerously) by pinfall	Singles match	5:36
8	Sal Bellomo, Stevie Wonderful and Super Destroyer #1 defeated the Suicide Blondes (Sir Jonathan Hotbody and Sir Richard Michaels) and Hunter Q. Robbins III by pinfall	Six-man tag team match	10:09
9	"Hot Stuff" Eddie Gilbert (with Paul E. Dangerously) defeated Terry Funk by touching all four turnbuckles	Texas chain match massacre for the title of "King of Philadelphia"	17:13
(c) / – the champion(s) heading into the match
