= J. T. Smith (wrestler) =

American professional wrestler (born 1967)

Personal information
- Born: John T. Smith; April 25, 1967 (age 59) Philadelphia, Pennsylvania, U.S.

Professional wrestling career
- Ring name(s): Boogie Man; J. T. Smith
- Billed height: 6 ft 2 in (188 cm)
- Billed weight: 235 lb (107 kg)
- Billed from: Philadelphia, Pennsylvania
- Debut: June 9, 1990
- Retired: September 19, 1998

John T. Smith (born April 25, 1967) is an American retired professional wrestler, better known by his ring name, J. T. Smith. He is best known for his appearances with Extreme Championship Wrestling in the 1990s.

== Professional wrestling career ==
=== Early career (1990–1992) ===
Smith began his career in the Philadelphia-based Tri-State Wrestling Alliance, where he trained alongside The Sandman in the Tri-State Wrestling Alliance professional wrestling school. It was at this school that Smith assisted Terry Funk in the planning of the fight choreography of the climatic alleyway scene at the end of Rocky V. Smith's debut match occurred at Temple University in 1990 at McGonigle Hall as he wrestled to a draw with The Sandman. Fans and promoters were quick to note his wrestling skills and natural athletic ability and he continued to rise through the ranks. In December 1990, Smith appeared with the World Wrestling Federation as an enhancement talent, wrestling on WWF Superstars of Wrestling and WWF Wrestling Challenge. In early 1991, Smith scored an upset win over veteran Buddy Landell to win the TWA Heavyweight Championship. During this time, Smith worked as a movie theater projectionist, at United Artist Movie Theater, as a bouncer at a club, and at Tod Gordon's jewelry store and loan office, Carver W. Reed Co. Inc, in Philadelphia. At one point, Smith worked for the United States Wrestling Association.

=== Eastern Championship Wrestling / Extreme Championship Wrestling (1992–1998) ===
==== Maryland Champion; Television Champion (1992–1994) ====
Smith joined Tri-State Wrestling Alliance's successor Eastern Championship Wrestling (ECW) as a fan favorite, where he competed at the company's first event Market Street Mayhem on February 25, 1992 by teaming with D. C. Drake to wrestle Johnny Hotbody and Larry Winters to a double disqualification. The two teams met in a rematch on March 24, which Smith and Drake won. On April 25, Smith participated in a battle royal to qualify for a match to determine the inaugural ECW Heavyweight Champion. On June 23, Smith teamed with Jimmy Jannetty to participate in a tournament for the new ECW Tag Team Championship, where they lost to The Super Destroyers in the semi-final round.

The following year, Smith entered a tournament for the vacant ECW Television Championship, losing to Eddie Gilbert in the quarter-final round on the April 13, 1993 episode of Eastern Championship Wrestling. On the June 8 episode of Eastern Championship Wrestling, Smith entered a battle royal for the new Pennsylvania Heavyweight Championship, won by Tommy Cairo. Smith unsuccessfully challenged Jimmy Snuka for the Television Championship at Super Summer Sizzler Spectacular. On the August 3 episode of Eastern Championship Wrestling, Smith lost to The Dark Patriot, which was notable for the 20 foot fall Smith took from an upstairs announcing area onto the floor, followed by the Dark Patriot leaping from the upstairs area onto the back of Smith. This was regarded by many fans as the match that gave birth to ECW. This incident led to a scaffold match between Smith and Patriot at UltraClash, which Smith lost.

On July 10, 1993, Smith had a dark match against The Sandman for World Championship Wrestling.

Smith received a title shot against Shane Douglas for the Heavyweight Championship at NWA Bloodfest: Part 2. During the match, Terry Funk threw in the towel for Smith but Smith threw it back on Funk's face. Smith lost the match and Funk attacked him after the match. On October 16, Smith won a battle royal in North East, Maryland to become the first Maryland Champion, thus winning his first title in the company. However, Smith would become the only person to hold the title due to it being abandoned later that year. At Holiday Hell, Smith and Tommy Cairo unsuccessfully challenged Kevin Sullivan and The Tazmaniac for the Tag Team Championship.

Smith had a notable match at The Night the Line Was Crossed on February 5, 1994, in which he defeated Mike Awesome. On the March 22 episode of Hardcore TV, Smith defeated The Tazmaniac to win the Television Championship. During the match, Smith rescued Woman from The Public Enemy (Johnny Grunge and Rocco Rock), which resulted in a rivalry between Smith and Public Enemy. Smith successfully defended the title against Rockin' Rebel at the inaugural Ultimate Jeopardy event on March 26. He lost the title to The Pitbull on the April 19 episode of Hardcore TV after Public Enemy attacked Smith before the match. At When Worlds Collide, Smith teamed with The Bruise Brothers (Don and Ron) to defeat Public Enemy, Mr. Hughes and Shane Douglas in a handicap elimination match when he became the survivor of his team by single-handedly eliminating Public Enemy.

Smith's momentum would be slowed down in the following months. Smith attempted to regain the Television Championship from Jason on the September 13 episode of Hardcore TV but lost the match after suffering a knee injury. He wrestled The Public Enemy on several occasions in 1994 as he tried to win the World Tag Team Championship from Public Enemy with different tag team partners including The Sandman, Tommy Dreamer and Hack Meyers but failed to win the title. Smith defeated Hack Meyers at November to Remember. He would then face Stevie Richards in a losing effort at Holiday Hell.

Smith took a hiatus from ECW in 1995 to accomplish a childhood dream of working in Japan by competing for W*ING, where he portrayed the character of Boogie Man, whose likeness was based upon Michael Myers. For a time, Smith assisted in running the Philadelphia location of ECW's training school, House of Hardcore. While there, Smith trained Francine Fournier.

==== Full Blooded Italians (1995–1996) ====
Smith returned to ECW after recovering from an injury at Wrestlepalooza on August 5, 1995, where he faced Hack Meyers in a match. Smith achieved his greatest success and biggest highlight of his ECW career in that match as a result of a legitimate mistake, as he attempted a suicide dive to the outside on Meyers, but failed to get enough elevation; his knee pads caught on the ropes and he landed head-first on the arena floor. This resulted in a large, softball-sized swelling on his head, but Smith was able to defeat Meyers with the help of Italian wrestler Val Puccio. Paul Heyman turned this into a comedic storyline where Smith's injury and resulting concussion gave him mild brain damage, and he began believing he was Italian, even talking with an Italian accent. Smith befriended Puccio, thus turning into a villain for the first time in his ECW career. The ECW fans jeered Smith when he attempted a move and failed, but this time with a degree of affection. The moment birthed the "you fucked up" chant, which JT Smith later remarked "haunts me to this day". At Gangstas Paradise, Smith faced Hack Meyers in a rematch, in which he got counted-out after missing a moonsault and crashing through a table outside the ring. At Holiday Hell, Smith botched a split-legged moonsault against Meyers, which led to Meyers winning the match.

This successful character continued, and resulted in the formation of a faction known as the Full Blooded Italians with Val Puccio. Puccio left ECW in 1995 while Smith continued the character on his own. At Massacre on Queens Boulevard on April 13, Smith introduced Damien Stone as his "cousin" and the newest member of the F.B.I., nicknaming him "Little Guido", which would become the ring name of Stone. While the F.B.I. claimed to be purebred Italians, the fact that Smith was African American, which made this claim obviously dubious. FBI feuded with The Dudleys and Hack Meyers throughout 1996. At November to Remember, Smith lost to 2 Cold Scorpio in a loser leaves town match, thus being banned from competition for thirty days. At Holiday Hell, Little Guido kicked Smith out of FBI due to Smith losing to Scorpio.

==== Sporadic appearances (1997–1998) ====
Smith turned back into a fan favourite due to being kicked out of his own created F.B.I. by Little Guido and entered a rivalry with the Full Blooded Italians. He left ECW as a full-time competitor, returning to team with Chris Chetti to defeat Guido and Tracy Smothers in a non-televised tag team match at the Barely Legal pre-show in April 1997.

He then made his televised return for one night only at UltraClash on September 19, 1998, where he teamed with Tommy Rogers and Chris Chetti to defeat Little Guido, Tracy Smothers and Tommy Rich in an Italian Vendetta match. This would be Smith's last appearance in ECW and his last wrestling match as he retired from wrestling after the event.

=== Retirement ===
Smith retired after leaving ECW to pursue a career that allowed him to devote more time to his personal life and family. As of 2012, Smith was employed as an instructional support technologist at a community college in Virginia.

Smith made an in-ring appearance at Ring of Honor's event All Star Extravaganza on November 9, 2002, where he was interviewed by Gary Michael Capetta, only to be interrupted by Special K.

Smith appeared at both of the ECW reunion shows in June 2005. On June 10 at Hardcore Homecoming, he accompanied fellow former F.B.I. member Tracy Smothers to ringside for his match with The Blue Meanie and enabled Smothers to win when he struck Meanie with a pair of brass knuckles. Two days later at ECW One Night Stand, an ECW reunion show created by World Wrestling Entertainment, Smith and several other F.B.I. members accompanied Little Guido to ringside as he faced Super Crazy and Yoshihiro Tajiri in a three-way dance, but were unable to prevent him from being pinned and eliminated by Tajiri.

Smith attributes having suffered between ten and sixteen concussions due to his time spent in the professional wrestling industry.

== Championships and accomplishments ==
- Eastern Championship Wrestling / Extreme Championship Wrestling
  - ECW Maryland Championship (1 time)
  - NWA-ECW Television Championship (1 time)
- Tri-State Wrestling Alliance
  - TWA Heavyweight Championship (1 time)
