= ECW Gangstas Paradise =

1995 Extreme Championship Wrestling supercard event

Gangstas Paradise
- The ECW Arena.
- Promotion: Extreme Championship Wrestling
- Date: September 16, 1995 (aired September 26, 1995)
- City: Philadelphia, Pennsylvania, US
- Venue: ECW Arena
- Attendance: 1,175

Event chronology
← Previous; Wrestlepalooza	Next → South Philly Jam

Gangstas Paradise was a professional wrestling event held by the Philadelphia, Pennsylvania, United States–based professional wrestling promotion Extreme Championship Wrestling (ECW) on September 16, 1995. The commentator for the event was Joey Styles.

The name of the event referred to both the gangsta rap song Gangsta's Paradise by Coolio, which had been released the prior month, and The Gangstas, a tag team who were scheduled to compete in the main event. Gangsta's Paradise was used in the TV commercial spot for the video on ECW Hardcore TV.

Gangstas Paradise saw the ECW debut of "Stunning" Steve Austin, Psicosis and Rey Misterio Jr., all of whom would go on to greater prominence in the late 1990s in the World Wrestling Federation (WWF) and World Championship Wrestling (WCW).

Several matches from Gangstas Paradise aired on episode #127 of ECW Hardcore TV on September 26, 1995. The full event was released on VHS later the same year and on DVD in 2002. The bout between Psicosis and Rey Misterio Jr. was also featured on the 2000 compilation DVD Path of Destruction and the 2007 DVD Rey Mysterio – The Biggest Little Man, while the tag team bout between The Pitbulls and Raven and Stevie Richards was featured on both the 2001 DVD release ECW: Hardcore History and the 2004 DVD release The Rise and Fall of ECW. The main event was included on the compilation DVD ECW: Unreleased Vol. 2 released by WWE in 2013. In July 2019, the event was made available for streaming on the WWE Network.

== Background ==
Gangstas Paradise featured professional wrestling matches that involved different wrestlers from pre-existing scripted feuds and storylines. Wrestlers portrayed villains, heroes, or less distinguishable characters in the scripted events that built tension and culminated in a wrestling match or series of matches.

Gangstas Paradise took place shortly after three of ECW's most prominent performers – Chris Benoit, Dean Malenko and Eddie Guerrero – had resigned from ECW to join World Championship Wrestling, leading to concerns that the promotion was "on the ropes". ECW booker Paul Heyman attempted to compensate for the loss of Benoit, Guerrero and Malenko by signing Psicosis and Rey Misterio, Jr., two prominent luchadores recommended to him by Konnan. Heyman also hired "Stunning" Steve Austin, who had been released from World Championship Wrestling while rehabilitating an injury.

The event saw the continuation of a number of feuds, including The Gangstas versus The Public Enemy; Raven's Nest versus Tommy Dreamer, The Pitbulls and Francine; Mikey Whipwreck versus The Sandman; and 2 Cold Scorpio versus Taz.

== Event ==
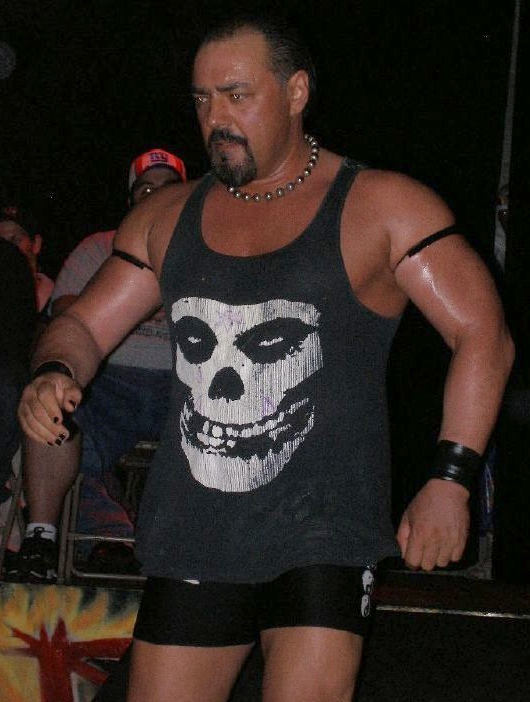
Jason scored an upset victory over Taz at Gangstas Paradise.

The opening match pitted Bull Pain against The Broad Street Bully. Following a brawl that saw the men fight at ringside and use weapons, Bull Pain won by pinning The Broad Street Bully after an elevated DDT.

The second match was a tag team bout between The Dudley Brothers and Chad Austin and Don E. Allen. The Dudley Brothers won a brief squash match when Dudley Dudley pinned Allen following a splash.

The third match saw Hack Meyers face J.T. Smith in a rematch from Wrestlepalooza. The bout ended when Smith (whose gimmick saw him continually botch moves) fell through a table at ringside while attempting a moonsault and was subsequently counted out.

The fourth match was a six-man tag team match, with The Eliminators and their manager, Jason, facing The Steiner Brothers and Taz. Jason won the match for his team by scoring an upset pinfall on Taz following interference from 2 Cold Scorpio, who kicked Taz in his injured neck.

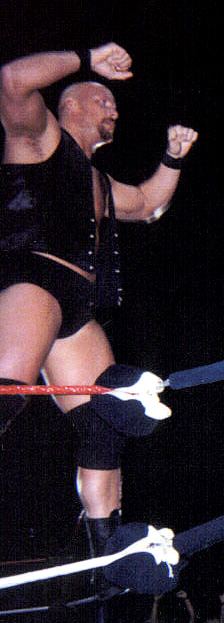
"Stunning" Steve Austin made his ECW debut at Gangstas Paradise.

The fifth bout of the evening was a tag team dog collar match for the ECW World Tag Team Championship between defending champions Raven and Stevie Richards and challengers The Pitbulls, with the stipulation that The Pitbulls would be forced to disband if they lost. The match began with Raven coming to the ring alone, after which his valet, Beulah McGillicutty, claimed that Stevie Richards was unable to compete due to a broken arm sustained the prior night and requested that the match be changed to two out of three falls. Pitbull #1 returned backstage and emerged dragging Richards with him, revealing that his arm was not broken. Meanwhile, Raven scored a pinfall on Pitbull #2 after piledriving him through a table. Several minutes later, Pitbull #2 evened the count by pinning Richards after The Pitbulls superbombed him through a table.

The Dudley Brothers then interfered in the match, helping Raven and Richards superbomb both of The Pitbulls. The Pitbulls no-sold the superbombs, immediately rallying and superbombing the Dudley Brothers, removing them from play. Shortly afterwards, Raven drugged Pitbull #2 by holding an ether-soaked rag over his face, then drove him through a table at ringside with a diving elbow drop, causing him to be helped backstage and leaving Pitbull #1 two-on-one.

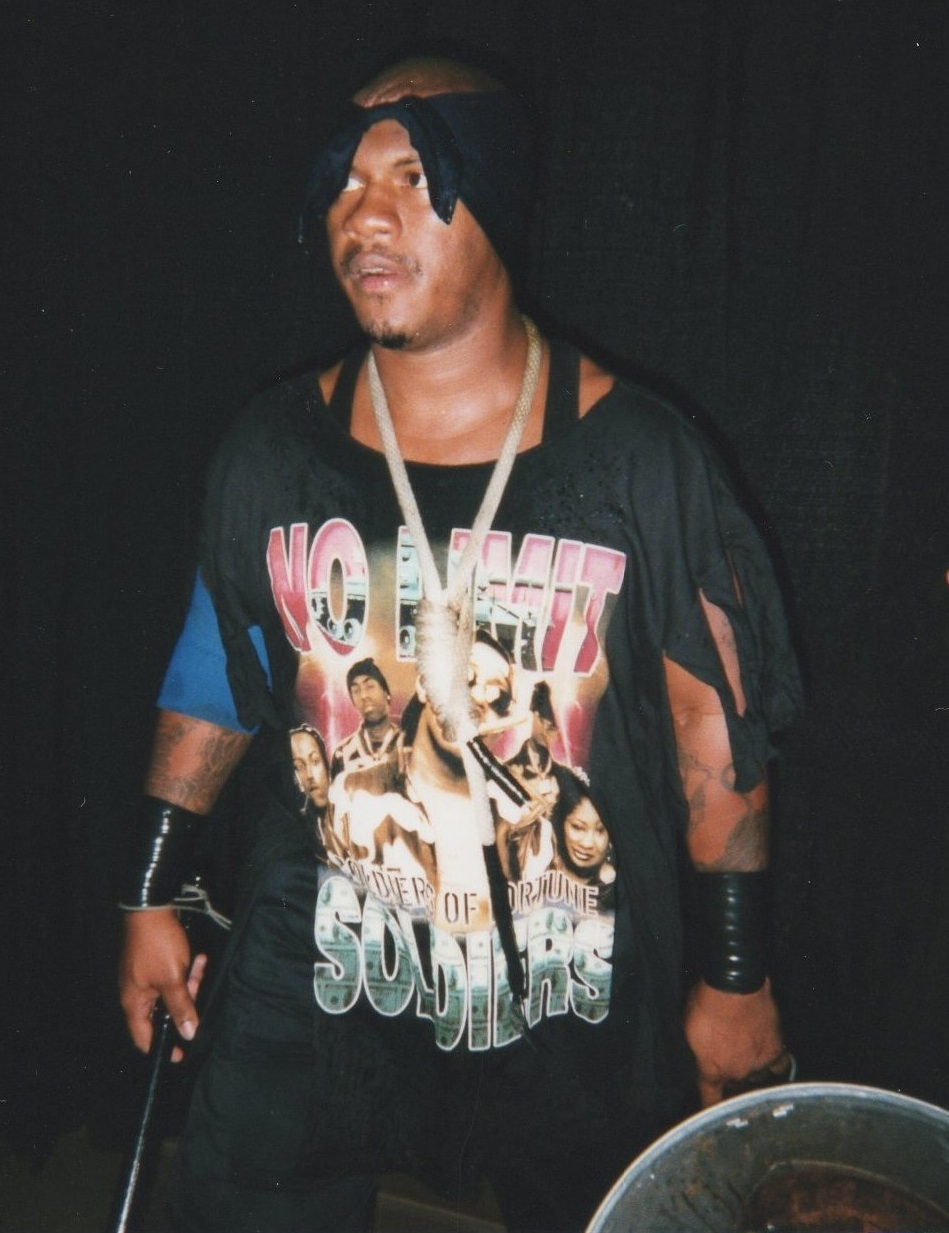
New Jack, one-half of The Gangstas.

Tommy Dreamer, Raven's nemesis, then ran to the ring and took Pitbull #2's place, quickly DDT'ing Raven and pinning him, apparently winning the titles. As Dreamer and Pitbull #1 celebrated, troubleshooting referee Bill Alfonso, who in the weeks prior to the event had repeatedly aided Raven by stridently enforcing minor rule infractions by Dreamer – came to the ring - accompanied by Big Dick Dudley – and overturned the decision, striking Dreamer's victory over Raven from the record and awarding the match to Raven and Richards. This led ECW commissioner Tod Gordon to enter the ring and argue with Alfonso, who attacked Gordon, resulting in Dreamer coming to his defense. Big Dick Dudley then gave Dreamer a chokeslam, a move that had previously been banned by Alfonso. After Alfonso announced that he was lifting the ban on the chokeslam for one night only, 911 – a wrestler whose signature maneuver was the chokeslam – entered the ring and chokeslammed Alfonso. Pitbull #2 then returned to the ring, with The Pitbulls executing a superbomb on both Raven and Richards simultaneously with the assistance of Dreamer and 911 then pinning both men to win the third fall and the match, becoming the new ECW World Tag Team Champions.

The sixth match was a singles bout between two luchadores, Psicosis and Rey Misterio, Jr., both of whom were making their ECW debuts. In a fast-paced match, Mysterio pinned Psicosis following a huracanrana. Writing in 2019, Mitch Passero of WWE stated that the match "had the ECW faithful on their feet and helped both young Superstars quickly make a name for themselves."

Before the main event, a vignette aired in which the debuting "Stunning" Steve Austin mockingly impersonated Hulk Hogan.

The main event was the titular "Gangstas Paradise" match, a six-man tag team match held inside a weapon-filled cage. The original line up for the match was The Gangstas (Mustafa and New Jack) and ECW World Heavyweight Champion The Sandman against Mikey Whipwreck and The Public Enemy. After Mustafa missed the event, he was replaced with ECW World Television Champion 2 Cold Scorpio. The match ended when Whipwreck pinned The Sandman after executing a splash from the top of the cage. Following the match, The Sandman attacked Whipwreck, resulting in the six men brawling as the event came to a close.

== Aftermath ==
The feud between Whipwreck and The Sandman continued, with Whipwreck defeating The Sandman for the ECW World Heavyweight Championship on October 28, 1995.

The events of Gangstas Paradise led to a number of matches taking place at South Philly Jam and November to Remember later that year. These included a two-out-of-three-falls match and Mexican death match between Misterio and Psicosis, a singles match between Gordon and Alfonso, and a tag team match pitting Raven and Cactus Jack against Dreamer and Terry Funk.

"Stunning" Steve Austin briefly competed for ECW, including unsuccessfully challenging Whipwreck for the ECW World Heavyweight Championship at November to Remember, before signing with the World Wrestling Federation later that year.

== Reception ==
The reaction to the event was highly positive, with the ECW World Tag Team Championship title match singled out for praise. Pat McNeill of the Pro Wrestling Torch described the match as "state of the art hardcore wrestling, pacing and booking", while Derek Burgan, also of the Pro Wrestling Torch, described it as "an absolutely insane brawl with a 10 star finish".

== Results ==
No.	Results	Stipulations	Times
1	Bull Pain defeated Broad Street Bully by pinfall	Singles match	8:12
2	The Dudleys (Dances with Dudley and Dudley Dudley) (with Big Dick Dudley, Chubby Dudley and Sign Guy Dudley) defeated Chad Austin and Don E. Allen by pinfall	Tag team match	4:16
3	Hack Meyers defeated J.T. Smith by count out	Singles match	10:00
4	Jason Knight and the Eliminators (Kronus and Saturn) defeated Taz and the Steiner Brothers (Rick Steiner and Scott Steiner) by pinfall	Six-man tag team match Jason was a last minute substitute as 2 Cold Scorpio was moved to the main event to replace an unavailable Mustafa Saed	20:00
5	The Pitbulls (Pitbull #1 and Pitbull #2) defeated Raven and Stevie Richards (c) (with Beulah McGillicutty) by pinfall 2-1 -Raven defeated Pitbull #2 via pinfall at 2:10 -Pitbull #1 defeated Richards via pinfall at 4:22 -The Pitbulls defeated Raven and Richards via double pinfall at 19:47	Two-out-of-three falls count anywhere double dog collar match for the ECW World Tag Team Championship; The final fall of the match was restarted when Tommy Dreamer, who was not scheduled to be in the match, scored an illegal pinfall Had the Pitbulls lost they would have been forced to disband	19:47
6	Rey Misterio Jr. defeated Psicosis by pinfall	Singles match	10:19
7	Mikey Whipwreck and The Public Enemy (Johnny Grunge and Rocco Rock) defeated 2 Cold Scorpio, New Jack and The Sandman (with Woman) by pinfall	Gangstas Paradise Cage match	15:08
(c) / – the champion(s) heading into the match
