= UltraClash (1998) =

1998 Extreme Championship Wrestling supercard event

- The ECW Arena.
- Promotion: Extreme Championship Wrestling
- Date: September 19, 1998 (aired September 23 and 30, 1998)
- City: Philadelphia, Pennsylvania, United States
- Venue: ECW Arena
- Attendance: 1,100

Event chronology
← Previous; A Matter of Respect	Next → House Party

UltraClash chronology
← Previous; 1993	Next → Last

UltraClash (1998) was the second and final UltraClash professional wrestling supercard event produced by Extreme Championship Wrestling (ECW). It was held on September 19, 1998 in the ECW Arena in Philadelphia, Pennsylvania in the United States.

Excerpts from UltraClash aired on episodes #283 and #284 of the syndicated television show ECW Hardcore TV on September 23 and 30, 1998.

== Event ==
The event began with Tommy Dreamer giving a promo paying tribute to the Sandman (who had left ECW to join World Championship Wrestling) until he was attacked by Jack Victory, Rod Price, and Justin Credible, leaving him bloodied.

The opening bout was a singles match between Jerry Lynn and Mikey Whipwreck. Whipwreck won the match by pinfall following a Whipper-snapper.

The second bout was an "Italian vendetta match" pitting Chris Chetti and Tommy Rogers against the Full Blooded Italians (Little Guido and Tracy Smothers). During the match, Full Blooded Italians-member Tommy Rich joined the match alongside his stablemates, hitting Chetti and Rogers with an Italian flag. This drew out J.T. Smith - making his return to ECW - who joined the match alongside Chetti and Rogers, turning it into a six-man tag team match. The match ended when Chetti pinned Little Guido.

The third bout was a tag team match pitting the Blue World Order against Danny Doring and Ulf Herman. The Blue World Order won the match, with the Blue Meanie pinning Doring.

The fourth bout was a mixed tag team match pitting Chris Candido and Tammy Lynn Sytch against Lance Storm and Tammy Lynn Bytch. Candido and Sytch won the bout, with Sytch pinning Storm.

The fifth bout was a singles match between D-Von Dudley and Masato Tanaka. During the match, Dudley's tag team partner Buh Buh Ray Dudley repeatedly interfered on his behalf. The match ended when Tanaka gave D-Von Dudley a DDT then Buh Buh Ray Dudley accidentally gave him a big splash, enabling Tanaka to pin D-Von Dudley. Following the match, the Triple Threat (Bam Bam Bigelow, Chris Candido, and ECW World Heavyweight Champion Shane Douglas) beat down Tanaka.

The sixth bout was a singles match between Balls Mahoney and Mike Awesome. Mahoney won the match by pinfall following a Nutcracker Suite. During the match, Awesome sustained a torn anterior cruciate ligament; he did not wrestle again until September 1999.

The seventh bout was a "Philadelphia street fight" pitting the Gangstanators and Tommy Dreamer against Jack Victory, Justin Credible, and Rod Price. The Gangstanators and Dreamer won the bout when New Jack pinned Price after hitting him with a guitar.

Following the seventh bout, Bilvis Wesley swept the ring until his broom broke, upon which he gave a promo insulting the audience until the returning 911 came to the ring and chokeslammed him. Judge Jeff Jones then came to the ring and issued an open challenge for anyone to face 911, which was accepted by the far-smaller Spike Dudley. After 911 attempted to chokeslam Dudley, Dudley countered with an eye rake, then gave 911 a low blow following by an Acid Drop before pinning him for an upset victory.

The main event was a six-man tag team match pitting Rob Van Dam and Sabu (the then-ECW World Tag Team Champions) and Masato Tanaka against the Triple Threat. The match ended in a no contest when the Dudley Boyz interfered, giving a 3D to Tanaka and joining the Triple Threat in attacking Sabu and Van Dam. Mikey Whipwreck and the Blue World Order came to the ring to try and assist Sabu and Van Dam, but were thrown out of the ring. Taz then came to the ring and drove off the Triple Threat and the Dudley Boyz. Shane Douglas then attempted to attack Taz from behind, only for Taz to give him a T-bone Tazplex. The event ended with Sabu, Van Dam, Taz, and Bill Alfonso celebrating in the ring.

== Results ==
No.	Results	Stipulations	Times
1	Mikey Whipwreck defeated Jerry Lynn by pinfall	Singles match	—
2	Chris Chetti, J.T. Smith and Tommy Rogers defeated the Full Blooded Italians (Little Guido, Tommy Rich and Tracy Smothers) (with Sal E. Graziano) by pinfall	"Italian vendetta match"	—
3	The Blue World Order (Super Nova and the Blue Meanie) defeated Danny Doring and Ulf Herman (with Lance Wright) by pinfall	Tag team match	—
4	Chris Candido and Tammy Lynn Sytch defeated Lance Storm and Tammy Lynn Bytch by pinfall	Mixed tag team match	—
5	Masato Tanaka defeated D-Von Dudley (with Buh Buh Ray Dudley) by pinfall	Singles match	6:30
6	Balls Mahoney (with Axl Rotten) defeated Mike Awesome by pinfall	Singles match	—
7	The Gangstanators (Kronus and New Jack) and Tommy Dreamer defeated Jack Victory, Justin Credible and Rod Price (with Chastity, Jason, Lance Wright and Nicole Bass) by pinfall	"Philadelphia street fight"	4:38
8	Spike Dudley defeated 911 (with Judge Jeff Jones) by pinfall	Singles match	—
9	Rob Van Dam and Sabu (with Bill Alfonso) and Masato Tanaka vs. the Triple Threat (Bam Bam Bigelow, Chris Candido, and Shane Douglas) ended in a no contest	Six-man tag team match	—
