= Vladimir Koloff =

American professional wrestler

Personal information
- Born: Carl R Brantley Muncie, Indiana, U.S.

Professional wrestling career
- Ring name: Vladimir Koloff
- Billed height: 6 ft 4 in (1.93 m)
- Billed weight: 290 lb (130 kg)
- Billed from: Russia
- Trained by: Ivan Koloff, George Hines, Bobby Fulton
- Debut: 1991
- Retired: 2001

Carl Brantley is an American retired professional wrestler, best known by the ring name Vladimir Koloff, who played a fictional Russian character during his career. He competed in Extreme Championship Wrestling (ECW), Smoky Mountain Wrestling (SMW), and Japan during the early 1990s.

== Career ==
Koloff made his professional wrestling debut in 1991 teaming with his storyline uncle Ivan Koloff for Smoky Mountain Wrestling. In 1992, they went to Japan to work for W*ING.

In 1993, the Koloffs made their debut for Extreme Championship Wrestling. The team won their debut match on the June 29 edition of ECW Hardcore TV. They competed in the ECW Tag Team Titles tournament defeating the Headhunters (professional wrestling) in the first round then lost in the semi-finals to Salvatore Bellomo and The Sandman.

After ECW, the Koloffs split up with Vladimir on his own. He competed in India, IWA Mid-South and the independents until he retired in 2001.

== Personal life ==
Since retiring from wrestling, Koloff has been working in agriculture breeding poultry.

== Championships and accomplishments ==
- Ultimate Championship Wrestling
  - UCW Heavyweight Championship (2 times)
- Pro Wrestling Illustrated
  - PWI ranked him # 221 of the 500 best singles wrestlers of the PWI 500 in 1992
  - PWI ranked him # 120 of the 500 best singles wrestlers of the PWI 500 in 1993
  - PWI ranked him # 145 of the 500 best singles wrestlers of the PWI 500 in 1994
  - PWI ranked him # 254 of the 500 best singles wrestlers of the PWI 500 in 1995
