= ECW Maryland Championship =

Former wrestling championship

Details
- Promotion: Eastern Championship Wrestling
- Date established: October 16, 1993
- Date retired: March 6, 1994

Other name
- NWA Maryland Heavyweight Championship
Statistics
- First champion: J.T. Smith
- Most reigns: J.T. Smith (1)
- Longest reign: J.T. Smith (141 Days)

The ECW Maryland Championship was a short-lived title in Eastern Championship Wrestling, later known as Extreme Championship Wrestling. It was also known as NWA Maryland Heavyweight Championship, and only existed from 1993 to early 1994.

== Reigns ==
Key
No.	Overall reign number
Reign	Reign number for the specific champion
Days	Number of days held

No.	Champion	Championship change			Reign statistics		Notes	Ref.
No.	Champion	Date	Event	Location	Reign	Days	Notes	Ref.
1	J.T. Smith	October 16, 1993	N/A	North East, MD	1	141	Won a battle royal.	
—	Deactivated	March 6, 1994	—	—	—	—	Title abandoned when J.T. Smith won the ECW World Television Championship.	
