= UltraClash =

Professional wrestling event

- Promotions: Eastern Championship Wrestling/ Extreme Championship Wrestling
- First event: UltraClash (1993)
- Last event: UltraClash (1998)

UltraClash was a professional wrestling supercard event produced by Eastern/Extreme Championship Wrestling (ECW). The event took place in 1993 and 1998 from the ECW Arena in Philadelphia, Pennsylvania.

== Dates, venues and main events ==
Event	Date	City	Venue	Main event	Ref
UltraClash (1993)	September 18, 1993	ECW Arena	Philadelphia, Pennsylvania	The Headhunters (Headhunter A and Headhunter B) vs. Miguelito Perez and Crash the Terminator in a Baseball Bat match	
UltraClash (1998)	September 19, 1998	ECW Arena	Philadelphia, Pennsylvania	The Triple Threat (Bam Bam Bigelow, Chris Candido and Shane Douglas) vs. Rob Van Dam, Sabu and Taz	
(c) – refers to the champion(s) heading into the match
