= ECW Pennsylvania Championship =

Former championship by Extreme Championship Wrestling

ECW Pennsylvania State Championship

Details
- Promotion: Eastern Championship Wrestling
- Date established: May 14, 1993
- Date retired: December 28, 1993

Other name
- NWA Pennsylvania Heavyweight Championship
Statistics
- First champion: Tommy Cairo
- Final champion: Tony Stetson
- Longest reign: Tommy Cairo (85 days)
- Shortest reign: Tony Stetson (42 days)
- Heaviest champion: Tommy Cairo (257 lb (117 kg)))
- Lightest champion: Tony Stetson (228 lb (103 kg)))

The ECW Pennsylvania State Championship was a short-lived title in ECW when it was called Eastern Championship Wrestling. It was also known as the NWA Pennsylvania Heavyweight Championship and existed in 1993.

== Reigns ==
Key
| No. | Overall reign number |
| Reign | Reign number for the specific champion |
| Days | Number of days held |

| No. | Champion | Championship change | | | Reign statistics | | Notes | Ref. |
| No. | Champion | Date | Event | Location | Reign | Days | Notes | Ref. |
|---|---|---|---|---|---|---|---|---|
| 1 | Tommy Cairo | May 14, 1993 | Hardcore TV #10 | Philadelphia, PA | 1 | 85 | Cairo won a battle royal to become the inaugural champion. Aired on tape delay on June 8. | |
| 2 | Tony Stetson | August 7, 1993 | Hardcore TV #22 | Philadelphia, PA | 1 | 42 | Aired on tape delay on September 14. | |
| — | Deactivated | September 18, 1993 | UltraClash (1993) | — | — | — | The championship is abandoned. | |
