= Jason Knight (wrestler) =

American professional wrestler and manager (born 1963)

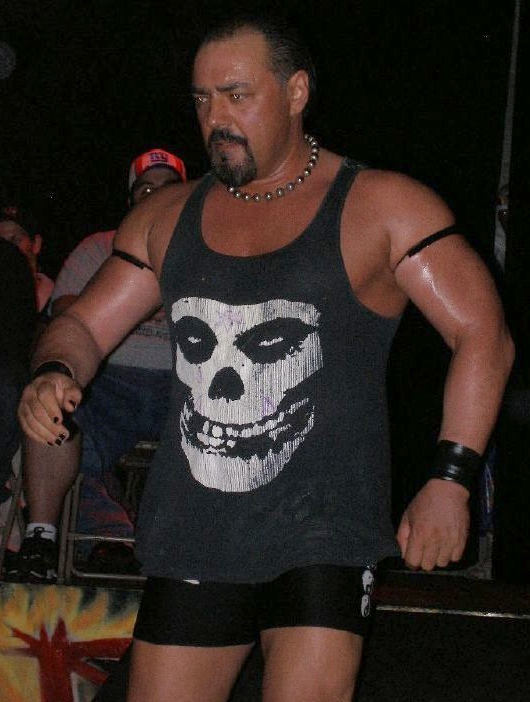
- Knight in 2007

Personal information
- Born: December 12, 1963 (age 62)
- Website: https://assaultchampionshipwrestling.com/

Professional wrestling career
- Ring name(s): Jason; Jason Knight
- Billed height: 5 ft 9 in (1.75 m)
- Billed weight: 224 lb (102 kg)
- Billed from: Europe
- Trained by: Johnny Rodz; Bobby Bold Eagle
- Debut: June 1984

Jason Knight (born December 12, 1963) is a professional wrestler and manager. He is best known for his stints in Eastern / Extreme Championship Wrestling, where he was a one time World Television Champion.

== Professional wrestling career ==
=== World Wrestling Federation (1992, 1993) ===
After debuting in 1984, Knight wrestled on independent circuit before making numerous appearances for the World Wrestling Federation in 1992 and 1993 as an enhancement talent. He made his first appearance on the July 4, 1992 episode of WWF Superstars, losing to Rick Martel. He would go on to lose matches in singles and tag team competition throughout July and August against Ric Flair, The Nasty Boys, The Mountie, Skinner, The Beverly Brothers and The Berzerker. On the February 1, 1993 episode of Monday Night Raw, he lost to Lex Luger in Luger's WWF on-screen ring debut. He again appeared on the April 26 episode of Raw in a losing effort to Mr. Hughes. After losing to Luger on the June 5 episode of Superstars and to Bam Bam Bigelow on the June 30, 1993 episode of Wrestling Challenge, he left the WWF.

=== Eastern / Extreme Championship Wrestling (1993–1995) ===
On September 18, 1993, Knight debuted in Eastern Championship Wrestling at the promotion's first UltraClash event, during which he and Ian Rotten lost a tag team match to The Public Enemy. Knight would wrestle one more match, a victory over The Canadian Wolfman, before leaving the promotion.

Nearly a year later, Knight, simply under the name Jason, returned to the now renamed Extreme Championship Wrestling on August 13, 1994 and defeated Mikey Whipwreck for the World Television Championship at Hardcore Heaven. Jason would successfully retain the championship several times against the likes Whipwreck, Rockin' Rebel, Hack Meyers and former World Television Champion J. T. Smith. On November 4, Jason was unable to become a double champion as he and Dean Malenko lost to World Tag Team Champions Whipwreck and Cactus Jack in a title match. That same night, Jason lost the World Television Title to Too Cold Scorpio. Jason would then reignite his feud with Whipwreck, with the two trading victories, before Jason began to manage The Eliminators. On November 3, 1995, Jason and Whipwreck ended their feud in a match for Whipwreck's World Heavyweight Championship, which Whipwreck retained. A few weeks later at November to Remember on November 18, Jason lost to Konnan in 14 seconds with Taz as the special guest referee.

=== Return to ECW (1997–1999) ===
After a brief stint in Big Japan Pro Wrestling in 1996, Knight returned to ECW in June 1997 at Orgy of Violence. He wrestled his first match back on August 11, 1997, where he lost to Chris Chetti via disqualification. Soon after returning, Jason began feuding with The Blue Meanie over the next few months, but never managed to pick up a win over Meanie. After their feud, Jason began to team with Justin Credible and he renewed his feud with Mikey Whipwreck as he and Credible wrestled against Whipwreck and Tommy Dreamer, but were unable to win any matches. Soon afterwards, Jason began to manage the Impact Players, Credible's new tag team with Lance Storm. On July 3, Knight and Credible finally won their first match together as they defeated Jerry Lynn and Prodigy. On August 29, Jason and Credible lost their final match together as they lost to The Sandman in a two-on-one Singapore cane match. Jason left ECW shortly afterwards before returning for one final match on August 2, 1999, which he lost to Jazz at Heat Wave.

=== Independent circuit (2000–2013) ===
Jason returned to Jersey All Pro Wrestling on July 14, 2000, where he won a 30-man battle royal for the Heavyweight Championship. That same night, he defeated Magic. On August 19, Jason defeated Don Montoya to retain the title. Over a month later on September 22, Jason retained his title against Ace Darling. On November 18, Jason left JAPW, resulting in the title being vacated. Knight, who was a booker for the independent promotion Acid Pro Wrestling, left the promotion before returning as its owner in 2001. He immediately renamed the promotion to Assault Championship Wrestling and began to promote shows within Connecticut. In 2004, the promotion folded.

On October 19, 2002, Knight returned to wrestling by debuting for Pro-Pain Pro Wrestling, where he defeated Del Tsunami. Over a month later on November 23, Knight lost to fellow ECW alum Gary Wolfe. On December 28, Knight made his final appearance for 3PW, where he defeated former rival The Blue Meanie for the first time. After another hiatus, Knight made his Total Nonstop Action Wrestling debut on June 11, 2003 in a tag team match, which he and CB Cane lost to Mike Sanders and Sonny Siaki.

On August 2, 2003, Knight debuted in Memphis Wrestling, where he lost a five-man buried alive match to Abyss that also involved Dr. Frank, Freddie Krueger and Lord Humongous. After another hiatus, Knight returned to Memphis Wrestling on October 30, 2004, where he lost a 13-man battle royal.

On April 12, 2013, Knight returned to the World Wrestling Organization and defeated rival Magic for the heavyweight championship in Paterson, NJ. Knight previously held the title back in 1994 but vacated the title when he won the ECW TV Championship. Teamed with Rockin' Rebel during this time. August 2, 2013, Knight defeated the Atomic Dog as part of the SummerBash event held in Paterson, NJ to win the vacant CWA(North East version) Championship.

=== Hiatus and return (2005, 2006–2009) ===
On June 10 and June 12, 2005, Knight appeared at both Hardcore Homecoming and the World Wrestling Entertainment-produced ECW One Night Stand pay-per-view, two Extreme Championship Wrestling reunion events. After a hiatus, Knight debuted in Defiant Pro Wrestling on October 14, 2006. After a year within the promotion, he won the Television Championship, the third title in his career, from Sevin Leonard on November 17, 2007. Knight would successfully retain the title until he lost it to William King on February 10, 2008.

On April 26, Knight and Ron Zombie lost to Slaughterhouse (Crazy Chainsaw Bastard and The Outpatient) in a tag team match for Powerhouse Wrestling. Exactly a year and five months later, Knight returned to PHW, where he lost a hardcore match to Jose Perez. Later on in the night, he, Gino Martino and Jimmy Cash lost a six-man tag team match to Big Business, Don Vega and New Jack.

== Championships and accomplishments ==
- Defiant Pro Wrestling
  - DPW Television Championship (1 time)
- Extreme Championship Wrestling
  - ECW World Television Championship (1 time)
- Jersey All Pro Wrestling
  - JAPW Heavyweight Championship (1 time)
- World Wrestling Organization/Classic Wrestling Association
  - WWO Heavyweight Championship (2 time)
  - CWA Heavyweight Championship (1 time)
- World Xtreme Wrestling
  - WXW Hardcore Championship (1 time)
