= Rockin' Rebel =

American professional wrestler (1966 – 2018)

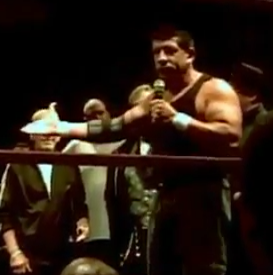

Personal information
- Born: Charles Williams; January 13, 1966 Montgomery, Alabama, U.S.
- Died: June 1, 2018 (aged 52) West Chester, Pennsylvania, U.S.
- Cause of death: Suicide by gunshot
- Spouse: Stephanie Williams (died 2018)

Professional wrestling career
- Ring name(s): Chuck Williams; Rockin' Rebel; The Dark Ninja
- Billed height: 6 ft 0 in (1.83 m)
- Billed weight: 245 lb (111 kg)
- Billed from: The Rock 'n' Roll Capital of the World (ECW); Montgomery, Alabama (WCW)
- Trained by: Ricky Morton; Robert Gibson
- Debut: December 1988

Charles Williams (January 13, 1966 – June 1, 2018) was an American professional wrestler, better known by his ring name, Rockin' Rebel. He was best known for his appearances on the U.S. independent circuit with promotions such as Eastern Championship Wrestling, Combat Zone Wrestling, Atomic Championship Wrestling, Classic Championship Wrestling, 1CW (Delaware) and Valour Pro Wrestling.

== Professional wrestling career ==
=== Early career (1988-1990) ===
Williams trained as a professional wrestler under The Rock 'n' Roll Express (Ricky Morton and Robert Gibson), debuting in December 1988 as Rockin' Rebel. In 1989, Williams made a few appearances in the World Wrestling Federation losing to The Honky Tonk Man and Brutus Beefcake.

=== Tri-State Wrestling Alliance and Extreme Championship Wrestling (1990-1995) ===
In 1990, Rockin' Rebel signed with the Philadelphia-based Tri-State Wrestling Alliance. While touring with the TWA, Rebel became the first Tri- State Champion and had memorable feuds with The Sandman, D. C. Drake, and C. N. Redd. He also teamed with Jimmy Jannetty to form The Confederacy. They became top contenders to the tag team titles and feuded with teams such as the Super Destroyers and The Blackharts. Despite its success, the TWA ceased operations abruptly in 1991.

Rebel returned to the promotion in early 1993 after it had been renamed Eastern Championship Wrestling (ECW). He appeared at ECW's inaugural supercard, the Super Summer Sizzler Spectacular, in June 1993.

=== Independent circuit (1995-2018) ===
Rockin' Rebel hit the independent circuit after leaving ECW in 1995. He then had a brief stint in World Championship Wrestling (WCW) and numerous dark matches with the then called World Wrestling Federation (WWF). He had successful tours of Japan, Korea and Puerto Rico before returning to the U.S. in 1996. Throughout the mid-1990s, Rebel and fellow ECW alum Glen Osbourne formed a successful tag team known as Darkside. Together they won the Maryland-based Mid-Eastern Wrestling Federation tag team titles five times, the Virginia-based International Pro Wrestling Association tag team titles twice, and appeared regularly for the NWA. On July 25, 2000, Rockin' Rebel debuted in Combat Zone Wrestling. He joined Lobo's Army and remained in the stable until it dissolved upon Lobo's retirement. He then formed a stable known as Rebel's Army with Derrick Frazier, Doomsday Danny Rose and former Tough Enough contestant Greg Matthews. Rebel and Matthews continued to team together in many promotions around the independent circuit such as PWF, 3PW, PWU, and World-1. Between 2003 and 2005, Rockin' Rebel made numerous appearances with Pro-Pain Pro Wrestling. He later wrestled for numerous independent federations, he wrestled his last match on May 10, 2014 for JCW in a losing effort against Q. T. Marshall. He was inducted into the DWF and IWPF halls of fame in 2012, and the ACW, MWF, and 1CW halls in 2014.

== Personal life and death ==
In the 1990s, Williams was arrested for holding his wife Stephanie hostage in a closet with a firearm to her head, also threatening to kill himself.

Williams died at home in West Chester in the early hours of June 1, 2018. On June 2, the West Goshen Township Police Department said he shot and killed his wife before shooting himself. His 10-year-old children found their bodies the next morning. On June 21, 2018, Kyros Law announced that Williams' family decided to donate his brain for CTE research.

== Championships and accomplishments ==
- Atomic Championship Wrestling
  - ACW Heavyweight Championship (4 time)
  - ACW Tag Team Championship (2 times) - with Kitt and Heavy D
- Blackball'd Wrestling Organization
  - BWO Tag Team Championship (1 time) - with Greg Matthews
- Combat Zone Wrestling
  - CZW World Tag Team Championship (1 time) - with Greg Matthews
- Defiant Championship Wrestling
  - DCW Heavyweight Championship (1 time)
- Elite Generation Wrestling
  - EGW Heavyweight Championship (1 time)
- Empire Wrestling Alliance
  - EWA Heavyweight Championship (1 time)
- Independent Pro Wrestling Alliance
  - IPWA Tag Team Championship (1 time) - with Glen Osbourne
- Liberty All-Star Wrestling
  - LAW Heavyweight Championship (1 time)
  - LAW Tag Team Championship (1 time) - with Jimmy Jannetty
- Lethal Wrestling Federation
  - LWF Heavyweight Championship (1 time)
- Mid-Eastern Wrestling Federation
  - MEWF Tag Team Championship (3 times) - with Glen Osbourne
- NWA New Jersey
  - NWA North Jersey Heavyweight Championship (1 time)
- Northeast Wrestling
  - NEW Heavyweight Championship (1 time)
- Northern States Wrestling Alliance
  - NSWA Heavyweight Championship (1 time)
- Nittany Valley Wrestling
  - NVW Heavyweight Championship (1 time)
- Premier Wrestling Federation
  - PWF Universal Heavyweight Championship (1 time)
- Pro-Pain Pro Wrestling
  - 3PW Tag Team Championship (1 time) - with Greg Matthews
  - 3PW Tag Team Royal Rumble (2005)
- Tri-State Wrestling Alliance
  - TWA Heavyweight Championship (1 time)
- Valour Professional Wrestling
  - Valour Tag Team Championship - with Nyla Rose
- Virginia Wrestling Association
  - VWA Junior Heavyweight Championship (1 time)
  - VWA Tag Team Championship (1 time) – with Jeff Collett and Nick Thunderbird
- World Wide Wrestling Alliance
  - WWWA Television Championship (1 time)
- World Xtreme Wrestling
  - WXW Heavyweight Championship (1 time)
