= Tommy Cairo =

American professional wrestler (born 1958)

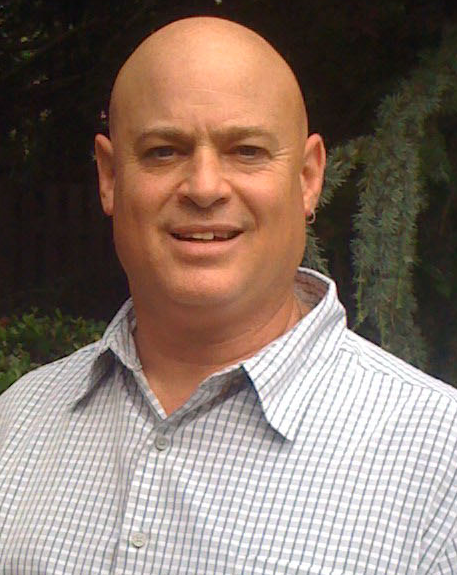
- Tommy Cairo in July 2008

Personal information
- Born: Thomas Cairo; February 19, 1958 (age 68) Philadelphia, Pennsylvania, U.S.

Professional wrestling career
- Ring name: Tommy Cairo
- Billed height: 5 ft 10 in (1.78 m)
- Billed weight: 227 lb (103 kg)
- Debut: 1988
- Retired: 2013

Thomas Cairo (born February 19, 1958) is an American retired professional wrestler. He is best known for his appearances with Eastern Championship Wrestling from 1992 to 1994, in particular his feud with The Sandman. He is the former co-owner of the New Jersey–based Force One Pro Wrestling promotion and school.

== Early life ==
Cairo was a bodybuilder before training as a professional wrestler. As a bodybuilder he placed 9th place in the AAU Mr. America 1985 Medium group.

== Professional wrestling career ==
=== Early career (1988–1992) ===
Cairo debuted in 1988.

In 1993, Cairo wrestled several matches with the Japanese UWF International promotion.

=== Eastern/Extreme Championship Wrestling (1992–1994) ===
==== Pennsylvania Champion ====
In 1992, Cairo joined Eastern Championship Wrestling, where he used the song "We Will Rock You" by Queen as his entrance music. On May 14, 1993 in Philadelphia, Cairo won a battle royal to become the inaugural NWA Pennsylvania Heavyweight Champion. He held the title until August 7, 1993, when he was defeated by Tony Stetson.

==== Feuding with The Sandman ====
Cairo was originally an ally of The Sandman, assisting him in his feud with Jason Knight. The alliance crumbled in February 1994 after The Sandman was temporarily blinded following a match and inadvertently struck his wife, Peaches. When The Sandman regained his sight and saw Cairo assisting Peaches to her feet, he attacked Cairo. The Sandman subsequently became estranged from his wife (claiming "life's a bitch, and then you marry one"), and Peaches became the valet of Cairo. After Cairo insinuated that he was sleeping with Peaches, The Sandman stated that Cairo owed him "$25 a romp" and began demanding that Cairo "pay your bills".

Following the highly publicised caning of Michael P. Fay in Singapore on May 5, 1994, Cairo and Peaches faced The Sandman and his new manager, Woman, in an intergender "Singapore Caning" match on May 14, 1994 at When Worlds Collide. After Cairo and Peaches defeated their opponents, Peaches caned The Sandman's crotch until Woman threw salt in her eyes, enabling The Sandman to regroup and use his cane on both Cairo and Peaches. The feud led to a "Cane on a Pole" match on June 24, 1994 at Hostile City Showdown that was ruled a No Contest after the cane fell off the pole and The Sandman retrieved a second cane from beneath the ring, and a "Dueling Canes" match on July 16, 1994 at Heat Wave 1994 that was won by The Sandman.

In late 1994, The Sandman was once again "blinded" after a lit cigarette was pushed into his eye during an "I Quit" match with Tommy Dreamer. The Sandman subsequently claimed that he would have to retire as a result, with Dreamer responding by dedicating the remainder of his career to The Sandman. Cairo began mocking The Sandman, which led to Dreamer heavily beating him in a match on November 5, 1994 at November to Remember 1994. During The Sandman's retirement ceremony, The Sandman reconciled with Peaches (Woman had abandoned him upon his blinding) before revealing that he was not in fact blinded and attacking Dreamer. The Sandman later revealed that his "blinding" had been an elaborate ruse concocted to trick Dreamer into hurting Cairo on his behalf.

=== Independent circuit (1994–2013) ===
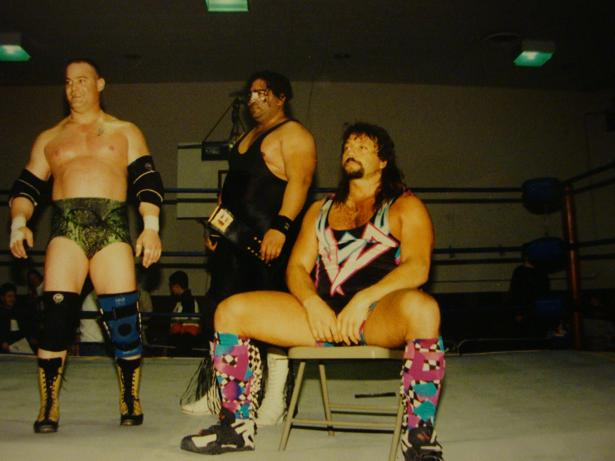
Cairo (left) with Falcon Coperis and Marty Jannetty (sitting) in 1997

Cairo left ECW in the mid-1990s. On June 24, 1995 in Williamstown, New Jersey, Cairo defeated Devon Storm in the finals of a tournament for the vacant NWA North American Heavyweight Championship. He was stripped of the title in 1996 after no-showing a defense, due to the birth of his first child. Between 1996 and 1997 Cairo held the Ultimate Championship Wrestling North American Heavyweight Championship, he wrestled in various matches with the likes of Chris Chavis aka "Tatanka", Bruce Hart, Jim Neidhart, Falcon Coperis. Between 1998 and 2000, Cairo operated the Outlaws of Wrestling promotion in Atlantic City, New Jersey. In the same time period, he appeared with USA Pro Wrestling, winning both the Heavyweight and North American championships.

In September 2001, Cairo retired from professional wrestling and began working as an electrician. In 2007, Cairo returned to wrestling when he, former wrestling radio host Phil Varlese, and wrestlers The White Lotus (Pat Di Giacomo), and Diego DeMarco (James Pilman) opened a professional wrestling school and promotion in the Northeastern United States known as Force One Pro Wrestling. Force One Pro Wrestling held its inaugural event, "Pledge of Allegiance", on May 19, 2007, in Egg Harbor City, New Jersey, with Cairo, (in his capacity as commissioner) crowning Heavyweight Champion Breaker Morant and Junior Heavyweight Champion White Lotus. In late 2009, Cairo resigned from Force One Pro Wrestling as well, turning the promotion over to Diego DeMarco (James Pilman) & former student turned wrestler Johnny Calzone (John Short), who took the promotion in a different direction, renaming the promotion Force 1 Pro, who ran shows in the same venues as the old Force One. Cairo returned to the business in 2011 with Coastal Pro Wrestling (again with former partner Phil Varlese, and with former NWA official Fred "Richards" Rubenstein). Coastal signed on as a National Wrestling Alliance affiliate, and eventually a licensee, but broke away a year later due to differences with the ownership of the NWA. Cairo eventually split from Coastal after a 2-year run, and ran several shows under the Global 1 Pro Wrestling banner, before leaving the wrestling business again in 2013.

== Personal life ==
Cairo is married to his wife Alba with two children.

Cairo lost a leg due to sepsis in the early-2020s after being bitten while swimming in Chesapeake Bay.

== Championships and accomplishments ==
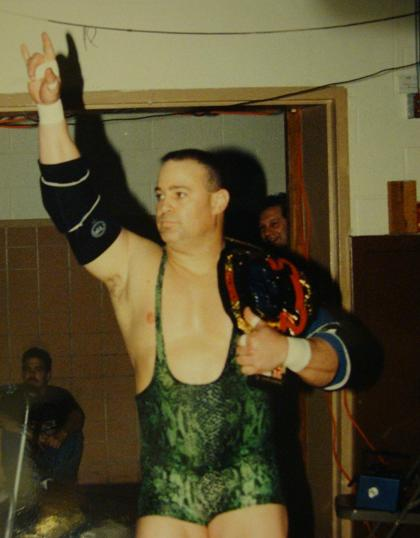
Cairo as UCW North American Heavyweight Champion in 1997.

- Eastern Championship Wrestling
  - ECW Pennsylvania Championship (1 time)
- Eastern States Wrestling / Eastern Shores Wrestling
  - ESW Heavyweight Championship (1 time)
- National Wrestling Alliance
  - NWA New York Television Championship (1 time)
  - NWA North American Heavyweight Championship (1 time)
- Outlaws of Wrestling
  - OoW Heavyweight Championship (1 time)
- Richmond Championship Wrestling
  - RCW North American Championship (1 time)
  - RCW Television Championship (1 time)
- Ultimate Championship Wrestling
  - UCW North American Heavyweight Championship (1 time)
- USA Pro Wrestling
  - USA Pro Heavyweight Championship (1 time)
- Ultimate Wrestling Federation
  - GWA Tag Team Championship (1 time)
- Unified Championship Wrestling
  - UCW Heavyweight Championship (1 time)
- USA Pro Wrestling
  - UPW Heavyweight Championship (1 time)
  - UPW North American Championship (1 time)
