= The Sandman (wrestler) =

American professional wrestler (born 1963)

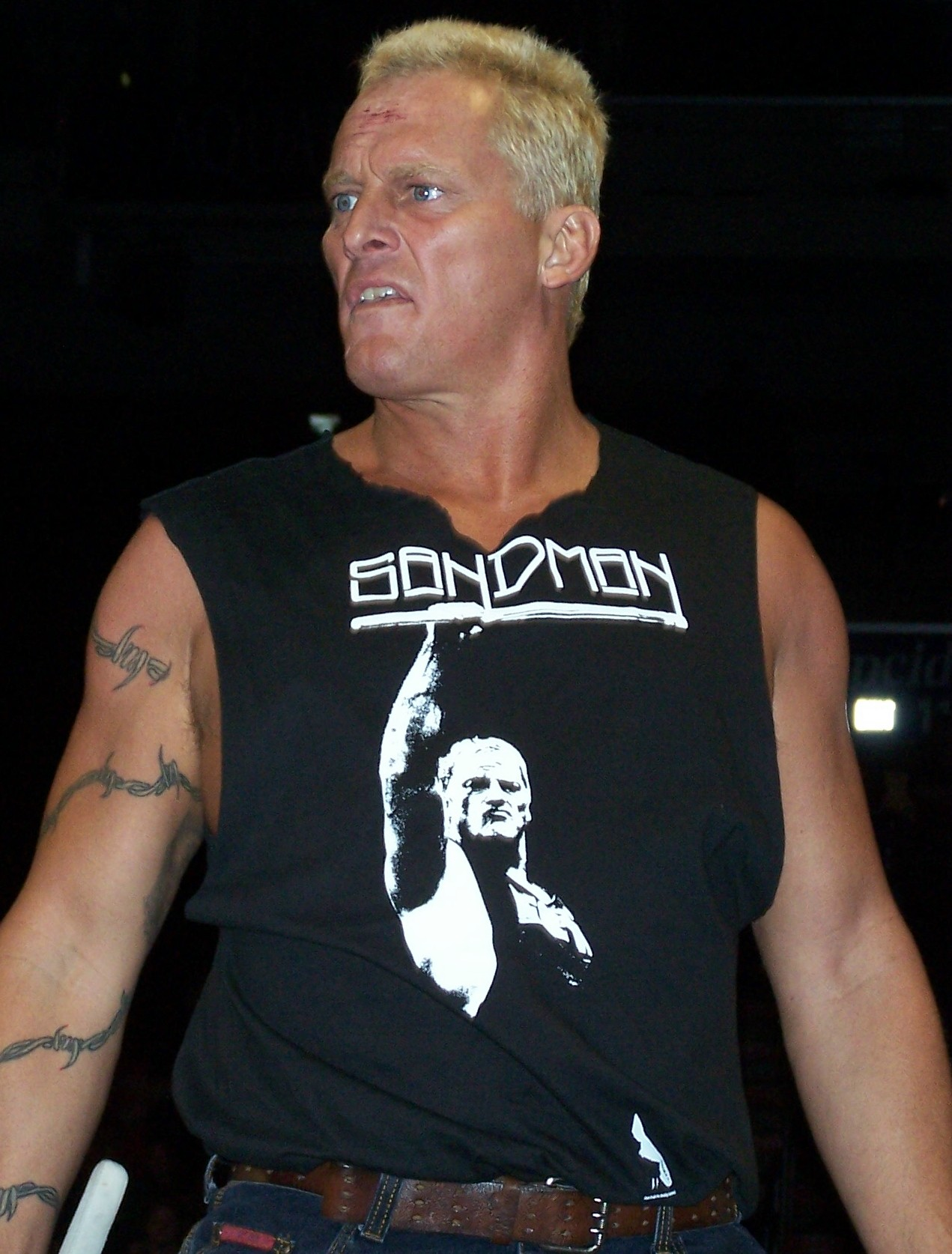
- Sandman in July 2007

Personal information
- Born: James Fullington; June 16, 1963 (age 63) Philadelphia, Pennsylvania, U.S.
- Spouse: Lori Fullington (divorced)
- Children: 4; including Tyler Fullington

Professional wrestling career
- Ring name(s): Mr. Sandman; The Sandman; Hardcore Hak; Hak
- Billed height: 6 ft 4 in (1.93 m)
- Billed weight: 240 lb (110 kg)
- Billed from: Philadelphia, Pennsylvania
- Trained by: Larry Winters; Tri-State Wrestling Academy; Mark Tendler; J. T. Smith
- Debut: 1989
- Retired: April 17, 2026

James Fullington (born June 16, 1963), better known by his ring name The Sandman, is an American retired professional wrestler. He is best known for his run with Extreme Championship Wrestling (ECW), where he developed into a smoking and drinking "Hardcore Icon" and held the ECW World Heavyweight Championship a record five times. He also had stints in World Championship Wrestling (WCW), Total Nonstop Action Wrestling (TNA), and World Wrestling Entertainment (WWE). Sandman retired on April 17, 2026, in a comedic match to the Invisible Man at Joey Janela's Spring Break X.

== Professional wrestling career ==
=== Early career (1989–1992) ===
Fullington got his start in professional wrestling in the Philadelphia-based Tri-State Wrestling Alliance under the ring name Mr. Sandman, managed by his then real-life wife Peaches. He also performed in Memphis for United States Wrestling Association from 1991–1992 feuding with Jerry Lawler.

=== Eastern/Extreme Championship Wrestling (1992–1998) ===
==== Surfer and Pimp (1992–1994) ====
In April 1992 he arrived in Eastern Championship Wrestling (later renamed Extreme Championship Wrestling) as a crowd favorite. His gimmick was a surfer carrying a surf board and wore a black wet suit with blue and pink lines. He won his first ECW Championship from Don Muraco on November 16, 1992, but lost it back to Muraco on April 3, 1993. At the end of 1992, he changed his name from Mr. Sandman to The Sandman. For the rest of 1993, Sandman teamed on and off with J. T. Smith and was featured regularly.

In 1994, Sandman changed his gimmick after ECW owner Tod Gordon suggested that he channel his own personality into his character, creating an edgier gimmick. In February 1994, he began a feud with his former tag team partner Tommy Cairo, after The Sandman was temporarily blinded following a match and inadvertently struck Peaches. When The Sandman regained his sight and saw Cairo assisting Peaches to her feet, he attacked Cairo. The Sandman subsequently became estranged from his wife (claiming "life's a bitch, and then you marry one"). After losing a match against Cairo, that led to Peaches hitting him with a strap profusely, Woman attacked Peaches and led her back to the ring where Sandman held her and Woman applied the strap to her skin before Cairo returned to save her. After this event Sandman adopted Woman as his new manager. In keeping with The Sandman's character, Woman opened his beers and lit his cigarettes prior to matches. She began carrying a Singapore cane with which she struck The Sandman's opponents.

After Cairo insinuated that he was sleeping with Peaches, The Sandman stated that Cairo owed him "$25 a romp" and began demanding that Cairo "pay your bills". Following the highly publicized caning of Michael P. Fay in Singapore on May 5, 1994, Sandman adopted another defining attribute of his new gimmick as he began wielding a kendo stick, referred to as a Singapore cane, taking delight in caning other wrestlers such as rookie Tommy Dreamer or his "estranged" wife. Sandman and Woman faced Cairo and Lori in a mixed Singapore Caning match on May 14, 1994, at When Worlds Collide. After Cairo and Lori defeated their opponents, Lori caned Sandman's crotch until Woman threw salt in her eyes, enabling Sandman to regroup and use his cane on both Lori and Cairo.

During a match against Tommy Dreamer, Sandman's valet: Woman attempted to attack Dreamer on his behalf when Dreamer planted a long kiss on her. After the match Sandman was told by Woman that Dreamer was with Cairo and that they were both sleeping with his wife, which enraged Sandman. Woman wanted to make Dreamer suffer and so she lured Dreamer into a match with Sandman wherein whoever lost would have to receive ten strikes from the other with a Singapore cane. After losing the match Tommy began to take the strokes, when it became clear that Woman's intention was to humiliate him by making him beg her for mercy, which he did not, much to her chagrin, and Dreamer was idolized by the fans for his resolve and the level of disdain for the Sandman was increased. This was a defining moment for both men and for ECW in years to come.

In late-1994, The Sandman was once again (kayfabe) blinded after a lit cigarette was pushed into his eye during an "I Quit" match with Tommy Dreamer. Woman blamed Sandman for the injury and abandoned him. The Sandman subsequently claimed that he would have to retire as a result, with Dreamer responding by dedicating the remainder of his career to The Sandman. Cairo began mocking The Sandman, which led to Dreamer heavily beating him during a match at November to Remember. At Sandman's retirement ceremony during the same event, an attempted reconciliation with Lori was interrupted by Woman, who caned Lori and threatened Sandman. As Dreamer came to the rescue, Sandman revealed that he was not in fact blinded and attacked Dreamer. The Sandman later revealed that his blinding had been an elaborate ruse concocted to trick Dreamer into hurting Cairo on his behalf. Sandman had to wrestle Dreamer again the following month at Holiday Hell when he and now reconciled partner Tommy Cairo, teamed up against Cactus Jack and Dreamer, but were defeated by the duo.

==== ECW World Heavyweight Champion (1995–1996) ====
Sandman challenged Shane Douglas for the ECW Championship in April 1995 at Three Way Dance, but was attacked by his own valet, Woman, who helped Shane Douglas retain the title. In a rematch at Hostile City Showdown on April 15, 1995, Sandman faced Douglas (who had Woman in his corner) in a rematch. During the course of the match, Woman turned on the now overconfident Douglas, helping Sandman become the ECW World Heavyweight Champion. It was revealed that the entire sequence of events was a double-cross planned all along by Woman to aid Sandman while psychologically destroying Douglas in the process. Douglas attempted to regain the championship in the following months, but left for the World Wrestling Federation before he was able. Sandman's first title defenses after winning the ECW Championship were against Cactus Jack, with the latter never getting the upper hand due to interference by Woman, rival Terry Funk, 'stickler' referee Bill Alfonso, and Douglas, who was bitter over losing his title.

Sandman's feud with Cactus Jack lasted throughout 1995 and culminated in a series of matches involving barbed wire. In a Texas Death match in February 1995, Sandman was hit with a heavy metal frying pan, giving Fullington a legitimate concussion. Throughout the remainder of the match, Fullington was visibly disoriented and forgot the scripted ending of the match; several times Cactus Jack hit Sandman with his signature double underhook DDT and again and again Sandman instinctively kicked out. This went on for about a minute before Cactus Jack delivered a legit maneuver, hoping it would keep Sandman down. The referee also had to resort to making the ten-count (as per the match's rules) at nearly double his original speed.

On October 25, Sandman lost the title to Mikey Whipwreck in a ladder match. Three days later, Sandman teamed up with then Television Champion 2 Cold Scorpio to win the ECW Tag Team Championship from The Public Enemy. On December 9 at December to Dismember, Sandman regained his World Heavyweight title by defeating Whipwreck and Steve Austin in a Three-Way Dance. At the end of the month, 2 Cold Scorpio lost both the Television and Tag Team Championships to Whipwreck in a singles match on December 29, while Sandman became embroiled in his feud with Raven.

Sandman spent the time period from December 1995 through May 1997 engaged in a feud with Raven. On January 27, 1996, Sandman lost the World Heavyweight Championship to Raven and the two subsequently traded the title back and forth. Sandman joined forces with Raven's nemesis Tommy Dreamer and on October 5, 1996, at Ultimate Jeopardy, regained the title by pinning Stevie Richards in an Ultimate Jeopardy tag team match pitting Sandman and Dreamer against Brian Lee and Richards, who replaced Raven when he no-showed the event.

During the feud, Raven allied himself to the returned Lori Fullington and brainwashed her and Sandman's real-life son into joining his cult-like following, turning him against his father. Raven psychologically attacked Sandman by having his son deny his relationship with his father, telling Tyler that his parents' divorce was Sandman's fault, and making him perform Raven's trademark taunt "The Raven's Crucifix" and other mannerisms. On October 26, 1996, at High Incident, Tyler interfered to help his father. Afterward, the two embraced, but Raven came from behind with a Singapore Cane and smacked his enemy by piledriving Sandman through the table. Stevie Richards and The Blue Meanie came out with a giant wooden cross and crucified him. On December 7 at Holiday Hell, Sandman again lost the title to Raven in a barbed wire match.

==== Various rivalries (1996–1998) ====
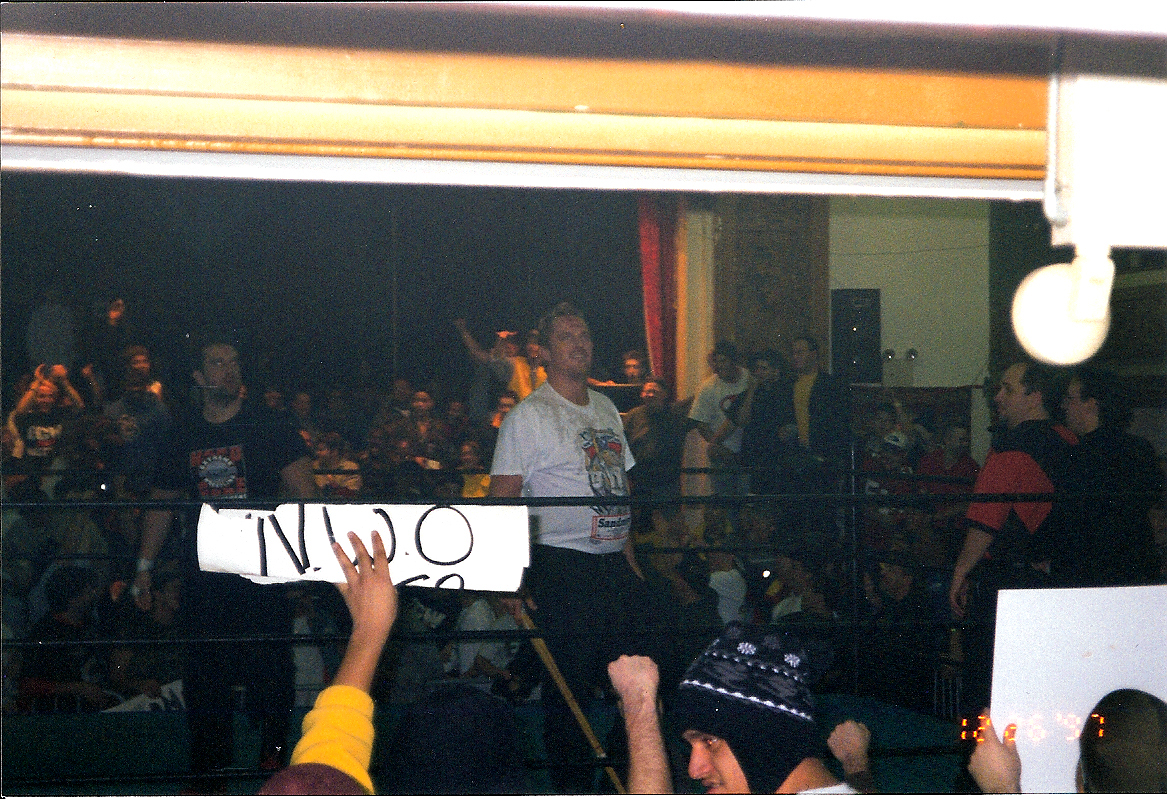
Tommy Dreamer & Sandman in 1997

In 1996, the team of Sandman and Tommy Dreamer became more permanent as the duo feuded with anti-ECW team of Sabu and Rob Van Dam, as well as the Dudley Boyz. At World Wrestling Federation (WWF)'s 1996 In Your House: Mind Games, Sandman, Tommy Dreamer, Paul Heyman and a number of other ECW stars caused a storyline disturbance at ringside during a Caribbean Strap match between Savio Vega and Justin "Hawk" Bradshaw. The disturbance resulted in Sandman whacking Vega over the head with his signature Singapore cane and spitting beer in his face. This event marked the start of the on-air working relationship between Vince McMahon's WWF and Paul Heyman's ECW and eventually led to ECW appearing on the February 24, 1997, WWF program Raw.

At the ECW premier pay-per-view event Barely Legal, Sandman wrestled a three-way dance with Terry Funk and Stevie Richards, for a shot at the ECW title later that night, but fell short of the title. In the summer of 1997, the Sandman began a long feud with Sabu. Although he was too injured to compete at Hardcore Heaven 1997, Sandman got involved in a skirmish with Rob Van Dam and Sabu who then brutalized him to the point of hospitalization, however, he returned later that evening to interference in the main event by assaulting Sabu, leading to Sabu's elimination, costing Sabu the ECW title. In September of that year at As Good as It Gets, Sabu badly burned the Sandman in a scheduled contest between the two. The damage to Sandman from the burn was considered so bad that the match was discontinued. As a result, Sandman was out of action until he once again attacked Van Dam and Sabu in the ring that November, earning a measure of revenge on Sabu. This led to their match at the November to Remember pay per view, which was promoted as a major cornerstone and culmination of all the events that year. In the match, Sandman dodged an attempt by Sabu to burn him, however Sabu went on to win the match. Over the next few months, they competed in high profile specialty matches such as ladder matches, table matches, and a dueling cane match. In one of the most notable examples, the Sandman fought Sabu in the 1st ever "stairway to hell" match involving tables ladders chairs and barbwire, which is especially noteworthy because no barb wire matches had been scheduled in ECW since after barb wire ripped open Sabu's bicep and required over 100 stitches in August 1997. The stairway to hell match proved to be one of the most violent in ECW history, coincidentally Sabu broke his jaw when missing a dive onto Sandman and inadvertently hit the guard rail, but continued to fight. After suffering heavy damage, Sandman earned the victory by finally pinning Sabu after hitting him with a cane. However, it wasn't until almost two months later that their feud effectively came to an end at Living Dangerously 1998. This match was heavily promoted and designated the penultimate which featured a dueling canes gimmick. During the match, the combination of Rob Van Dam and Sabu turned out to be too much for the Sandman, which led to him losing the contest.

Over the spring and summer of 1998, Sandman teamed up with Dreamer and Spike Dudley to feud with the Dudley Boyz, finally securing a victory in a six-man match at Heat Wave.

=== World Championship Wrestling (1993, 1998–1999) ===
Sandman made an appearance in July 1993 where he defeated JT Smith at a house show.

In September 1998, Fullington joined World Championship Wrestling (WCW), signing a 3-year deal believed to be worth $200,000 annually according to Dave Meltzer. He first appeared in vignettes promoting Raven as a spoiled rich kid and Fullington as his preppy neighbor. The original plan to debut under this gimmick were scrapped. He later debuted under his longtime nickname, Hak (The Sandman name was trademarked by ECW) when he called out Bam Bam Bigelow and challenged him to a Hardcore match on Monday Nitro. During the match he was defeated by Bigelow and was not named on screen during the entire segment. In his short time there, Hak was mostly involved in angles featuring fellow ECW alumni Raven, Bigelow and Raven's storyline sister Chastity, with whom he developed an on-screen relationship after she turned on Raven. A few weeks later, Turner Standards & Practices became aware of Chastity's participation in a hardcore pornographic movie. She was immediately removed from television with no explanation and her contract was terminated. His presence also helped to bolster WCW's fledgling hardcore division. WCW started promoting hardcore wrestling within their product through utilizing wrestlers like Hak and Bam Bam Bigelow. At Uncensored, Hak defeated Bam Bam Bigelow and Raven in a Falls Count Anywhere Triple Threat match. At Spring Stampede, Hak lost to Bam Bam Bigelow in a Hardcore match. At The Great American Bash, Hak defeated Brian Knobs in another Hardcore match. And a month later at Bash at the Beach, Hak competed in the Junkyard Invitational, which was won by Fit Finlay. He suffered a separated shoulder and a neck injury during the contest. This turned out to be his final appearance in WCW because during his recovery, Fullington was released from his WCW contract in September 1999 as part of a cost-cutting measure by new WCW Executive Vice President Bill Busch.

=== Return to ECW (1999–2001) ===
After leaving WCW in late 1999, Fullington, as The Sandman, returned to ECW at Re-enter the Sandman in October 1999. He remained with the company until its demise in January 2001. He began a feud with Rhino in 2000, losing to him at Hardcore Heaven, Heat Wave, and other shows. On January 7, 2001, at ECW's last pay-per-view, Guilty as Charged, the Sandman won his fifth World Heavyweight Championship in a Tables, Ladders, Chairs, and Canes three-way dance with the champion Steve Corino and Justin Credible. After The Sandman won, however, the World Television Champion Rhino came out to the ring and challenged him to an impromptu title match. The Sandman accepted the challenge and after a 60-second match, Rhino defeated The Sandman to become the new World Heavyweight Champion, unifying ECW's two singles titles.

=== Xtreme Pro Wrestling (2001–2003) ===
After the closure of ECW The Sandman wrestled for Xtreme Pro Wrestling (XPW) for a time. In February 2002, at the event Free Fall, he won the XPW King of the Deathmatch Championship from Supreme, turning heel and aligning himself with heel faction 'The E'. On a number of occasions Sandman was accompanied to the ring by former World Championship Wrestling (WCW) valet Tylene Buck. At XPW's 'Cold Day in Hell' reunion show, Sandman defeated Pogo the Clown, the wrestler he last feuded with before the company went out of business. While at XPW Sandman also wrestled within the fledgling Pro-Pain Pro Wrestling promotion. His most notable match was a 3-way dance with Sabu and New Jack. It is featured as a "bonus match" on the 3PW DVD Blood, Brawls and Broads.

In late 2002 and early 2003, The Sandman had a tenure in Total Nonstop Action Wrestling (TNA), joining former-ECW wrestlers Justin Credible and Raven, along with New Jack and Perry Saturn in a stable known as "Team Extreme" and later "Extreme Revolution". He also competed in the Hard 10 Tournament, where he partly feuded with Sonny Siaki before winning the overall event.

=== NWA Total Nonstop Action (2003–2004, 2010, 2019) ===
The Sandman made his surprise debut in NWA Total Nonstop Action on February 12, 2003, where he was defeated by Raven in a falls count anywhere match. a week later on February 19 Sandman and Steve Corino faced Raven and Low Ki in a losing effort, on February 26 NWA/TNA Weekly PPV, Sandman lost to A.J. Styles after Raven hit Sandman with a steel chair. After several matches in the promotion, in June 2003 Sandman competed in a TNA Hard 10, a tournament to proclaim the most hardcore wrestler in the company. Sandman defeated Devon Storm in the Quarterfinals, Sonny Siaki in the semifinals and New Jack in the finals to win the tournament. On July 9, Sandman accepted the Hard 10 Cup, and was attacked by Don Callous and Iceberg. After a 3-month absence Sandman returned on the November 5 where he was defeated by Shane Douglas. He worked for TNA until February 4, when Sandman and Terry Funk lost to The Gathering (CM Punk and Julio Dinero) and after the match The Sandman left TNA.

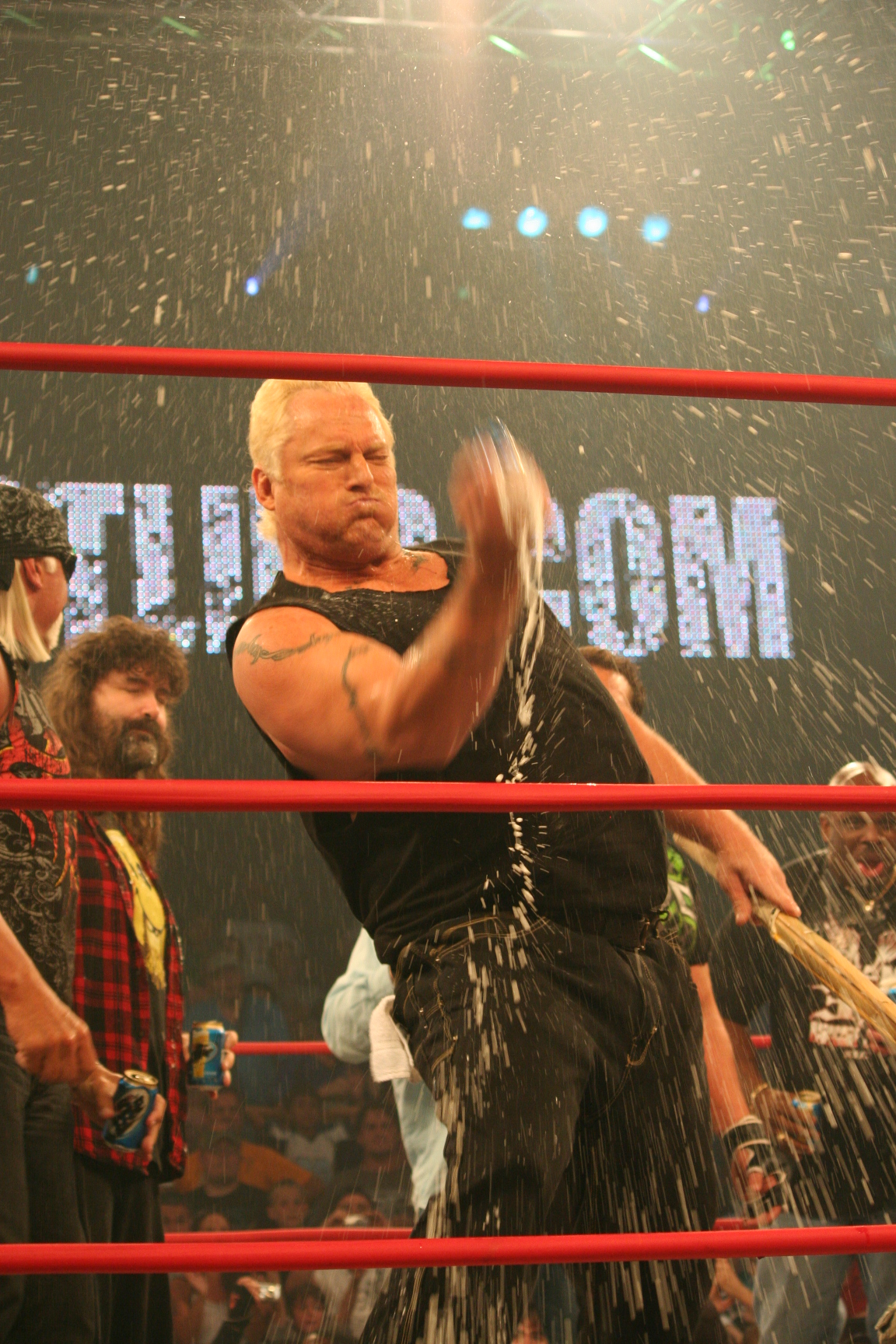
Sandman upon his return to TNA in July 2010

Sandman returned to TNA on July 27, 2010, at the tapings of the August 5 edition of TNA Impact!, in order to take part in the August 8 ECW reunion show, Hardcore Justice. At the event on August 8, Sandman assaulted former rival P.J. Polaco (Justin Credible) after his match with Stevie Richards. On the following edition of TNA Impact!, the ECW alumni, known collectively as EV 2.0, were assaulted by A.J. Styles, Kazarian, Robert Roode, James Storm, Douglas Williams and Matt Morgan of Ric Flair's Fourtune stable, who thought they didn't deserve to be in TNA. The following week TNA president Dixie Carter gave each member of EV 2.0 TNA contracts in order for them to settle their score with Fourtune. Sandman no-showed a TNA Impact! taping on August 23 and parted ways with the company.

On the May 31, 2019, episode of TNA Impact!, Sandman appeared during a match between Eddie Edwards and Killer Kross where he gave a Kendo Stick to Edwards helping him win the match. on the June 14, 2019, episode of TNA Impact!, Sandman lost to Killer Kross.

=== World Wrestling Entertainment (2005–2007) ===
In 2005, Sandman participated in the ECW reunion show Hardcore Homecoming against longtime rival Raven. Two nights later he appeared at the World Wrestling Entertainment (WWE) produced ECW One Night Stand pay-per-view event, another ECW reunion show, teaming with Tommy Dreamer to face The Dudley Boyz. The match saw Sandman and Dreamer lose to the Dudleys after Dreamer was powerbombed through a flaming table. In 2006, prior to the June 11 One Night Stand, The Sandman made a number of promotional appearances on WWE programming, first appearing, along with a number of other ECW stars, on Raw attacking John Cena then, two nights later, on the WWE vs. ECW Head to Head special taking part in a battle royal, in which it can be argued that he was the last ECW original eliminated. At One Night Stand, when Eugene made his way to the ring to read a poem expressing his love of ECW, The Sandman came out with his Singapore Cane and caned Eugene to the back.

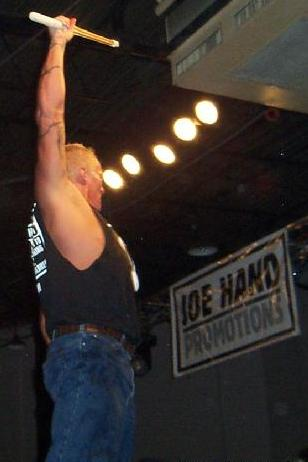
The Sandman wielding his signature Singapore cane during ECW's return in June 2006

On June 13, 2006, WWE officially relaunched ECW as a brand equal to Raw and SmackDown! with its own show on the Sci Fi Channel. In the new ECW, The Sandman was used for the first few weeks as a character who emerged from the crowd when a non-ECW style character was annoying the audience. Once the character had a few minutes to talk Sandman appeared and destroyed the character with his cane, often ending the "match" with his signature White Russian Legsweep. This gimmick escalated when Sandman confronted regular ECW fixture Mike Knox while he was attempting to stop his exhibitionist girlfriend, Kelly Kelly, in the middle of her weekly "exposé" strip show. The Sandman began a feud with Knox over this and eventually began teaming up with fellow ECW original Tommy Dreamer to take on Knox and Test in a feud that many felt symbolized the original vision of ECW (Sandman and Dreamer) versus the "new" vision of ECW (Knox and Test). At the same time Sandman was feuding with Test and Knox, a debuting Matt Striker began to rub him the wrong way and he started a secondary feud with him.

Subsequently, the Sandman has made several short appearances, mostly coming out through the crowd and caning someone whenever some injustice was done. After being briefly included in a feud with Elijah Burke, he became part of the ECW Originals stable and joined their feud with the New Breed. On April 1, 2007, at WrestleMania 23 he teamed with RVD, Sabu, and Dreamer to defeat Marcus Cor Von, Burke, Striker, and Kevin Thorn. On May 16, Sabu was released by WWE and soon after Rob Van Dam left to take a sabbatical from wrestling, leaving Sandman and Dreamer alone to feud with the New Breed. Sandman and Dreamer teamed up with CM Punk on multiple occasions, who was also feuding with the New Breed. On the June 4 episode of ECW, Sandman, Dreamer, and Balls Mahoney lost to Bobby Lashley in a hardcore three-on-one handicap match.

On June 17, 2007, Sandman was drafted to the Raw brand via the WWE Supplemental Draft. On the June 18 edition of Raw, Sandman debuted, going after Carlito with his Singapore cane. On the July 2 edition of Raw, Sandman had his first match on Raw, facing Carlito. Carlito won the match due to a disqualification when Sandman struck him with his cane after Carlito tried to use it on him. This started a feud between the two. Sandman did a similar thing next week when he lost to William Regal by disqualification, after hitting Regal and Carlito with his cane. The next week, Sandman faced Carlito again, this time winning when Regal attacked him. The Sandman was saved when Jim Duggan (who had a confrontation with Regal earlier that night) came down to the ring. At The Great American Bash he lost to Carlito in a Singapore Cane on a Pole match. The Sandman lost in a battle royal to determine the new General Manager of Raw where he was the last one eliminated by Regal who had faked an injury and was not in the match until Sandman was the only superstar in the ring; Regal then won after he snuck up on The Sandman and hit him in the back of the head with his boot. His last match was on the September 10 edition of Raw against Santino Marella which he won by disqualification. Fullington appeared to injure his ankle during a missed spot in this match and was released from his WWE contract on September 12, 2007.

=== Later career (2007–2026) ===
The Sandman appeared at IWA Mid-South's Ian Rotten Retirement Show in Plainfield, Indiana, on December 7, 2007, in a losing effort to Drake Younger. The next night, in Elizabeth, Pennsylvania, at the International Wrestling Cartel's A Call To Arms 4: Controlled Chaos, Sandman defeated Dennis Gregory in a steel cage match to capture the IWC Heavyweight Championship. The next night after that, he competed at the debut show for Firestorm Pro Wrestling, Destroy Erase Improve, in a match against Samoa Joe which he lost. On January 3, 2008, at the All Entertainment Action Wrestling event Crucifix Bombardment 2008 Sandman defeated 'The Raging Rhino' Hans Wilkshire in a Hardcore Match to win the vacant AEAW American Heavyweight Championship and the AEAW Hardcore Wrestling Championship. On April 19, 2008, he appeared on 1PW's supershow, 'Know Your Enemy 2008', in a losing effort to Damned Nation in an 8-man tag team match, where he teamed up with El Ligero and Bubblegum (Hubba Bubba Lucha) and Iceman. The Sandman then took part in a No Limit Wrestling special, in which he participated in a tag team match, in which he and his partner, Joe E. Legend, defeated Test and Chris Masters after a cane from Sandman allowed Legend to make the pin.

In October 2008, Sandman announced through a bulletin posted by his official MySpace account that he would be retiring from pro wrestling in the coming weeks. The bulletin stated that Sandman has a two-month-old child and a girlfriend to take care of, so he feels it is time to leave the wrestling business after a 20 plus year career. The bulletin also noted that he would still be accepting bookings over the next few weeks and that his official retirement date would be announced soon.

The Sandman appeared at the Armageddon convention in Auckland, New Zealand, wrestling for Impact Pro Wrestling between October 25–27, 2008. He defeated Joseph Kinkade in his first match and The Machine in his second match, both with the White Russian Legsweep. He then teamed up with IPW New Zealand Heavyweight Championship holder "The Deal" Dal Knox in a tag match against Kinkade and The Machine, which saw Knox take the win with a Knox Out on Kinkade. Sandman appeared at the Lonestar Bar & Grill in Temple, Texas, on July 13, 2009, wrestling for New School Federation. He was in a Tag Team match with the at the time NSF champion Ryan Genesis against the tag team of The Fringe Connection (Myke Fyre and Caribbean Tiger) in a NO-DQ match. Genesis scored the pinfall with the help of Sandman armed with a Singapore cane. On August 1, Fullington made an appearance at the Morecambe Carlton for the promotion SPW. There he along with fellow ECW alumnus Little Guido teamed up to take on the team of EGO.

Fullington made appearances with the Shane Douglas promotion Extreme Rising. Fullington's appearances mainly centered around him doing entrances to his theme music and performing "saves" for other wrestlers by caning their opponents. On February 2, 2013, Fullington made an appearance for WWC where he competed in a 4-way match for the #1 contender at the Puerto Rican title the match was won by Apolo. On June 21, 2013, Fullington competed for Family Wrestling Entertainment where he competed in a battle royal that was won by Tommy Dreamer. On February 8, 2014, Fullington teamed with his son Tyler Fullington to defeat Riley and Pete Lombardo.

On October 25, 2014, Fullington and Tommy Dreamer defeated Damien Darling and Danny Demanto. On July 2, 2016, Sandman lost a cage match to Sabu, in a match where Bill Alfonso was the referee. In March 2017 he teamed with New Jack and Justin Credible in a winning effort at an ECPW show.

On February 1, 2026, it was announced that Sandman would have his final match at Game Changer Wrestling's Collective during Joey Janela's Spring Break X on April 17, 2026 at Horseshoe Las Vegas in Paradise, Nevada. On February 10, 2026, Sandman's opponent was announced to be the "Invisible Man". Sandman lost the match.

On November 16, 2026, it was announced that Sandman would come out of retirement to face DCT at the BCW 10th anniversary event on December 4.

=== Cameo appearances for major companies (2018–2022) ===
In November 2018 Sandman lost to Silas Young on Ring of Honor (ROH) weekly television show. In February 2019, Sandman teamed with Tommy Dreamer to face Davey Boy Smith Jr. and Brian Pillman Jr. at Major League Wrestling (MLW). They lost the match after Dreamer was pinned.

During 2019 The Sandman made various sporadic TV appearances and has participated in a match for TNA Impact! as part of a storyline involving Killer Kross and Eddie Edwards.

On July 4, 2020, The Sandman made an appearance at ICW No Holds Barred 3 in Millville, New Jersey.

On April 1, 2022, The Sandman made an appearance at ICW No Holds Barred 24 in Newark, New Jersey.

On April 29, 2023 The Sandman made an appearance at Find Yourself Wrestling in Ridgefield Park, New Jersey where he successfully defeated The Dilf.

== In other media ==
Fullington appeared as The Sandman in the video games ECW Anarchy Rulz, Backyard Wrestling 2: There Goes the Neighborhood, WWE SmackDown vs. Raw 2008, WWE 2K24 as downloadable content, and WWE 2K25.

== Professional wrestling style and persona ==
Fullington's style of wrestling is hardcore. For most of his career he used a Singapore cane as a signature weapon. He came to use it on the suggestion of Paul Heyman, as the caning of Michael Fay in Singapore was a significant news story at the time. He is also known for his lengthy ring entrance where, to the sound of Metallica's "Enter Sandman", he would enter through the crowd, drinking beer as he went.

His finishing move is the White Russian legsweep. He will also use the Heinekenrana, Rolling Rock senton bomb and the DDT.

== Personal life ==
Fullington was married to Lori Fullington, with whom he has three children: Kelly (born 1987), Tyler (born 1989) and Austin Oliver (born 1998). Tyler was featured in ECW's Sandman versus Raven storyline and debuted as a wrestler himself in August 2008, wrestling as "Twisted Sand". Fullington also has another son with his second wife.

On July 20, 2008, at a party for Lou Albano, Fullington began fighting a Yonkers, New York, restaurant's employee when they called the police. Upon the police's arrival, he turned on them and started throwing glasses their way, injuring two of them. He was at first denied bail on July 23, due to two previous convictions for burglary in 1983. His bail was later set at US$10,000. The judge also issued a restraining order, barring Fullington from contacting the owner of the restaurant where the incident had occurred and Fullington was ordered to stay away from the restaurant. Fullington was fined $1,000, had to pay another $200 in court costs and was given a one-year conditional discharge. Fullington was also facing criminal mischief and assault charges, which were dropped in return for the guilty plea.

== Championships and accomplishments ==
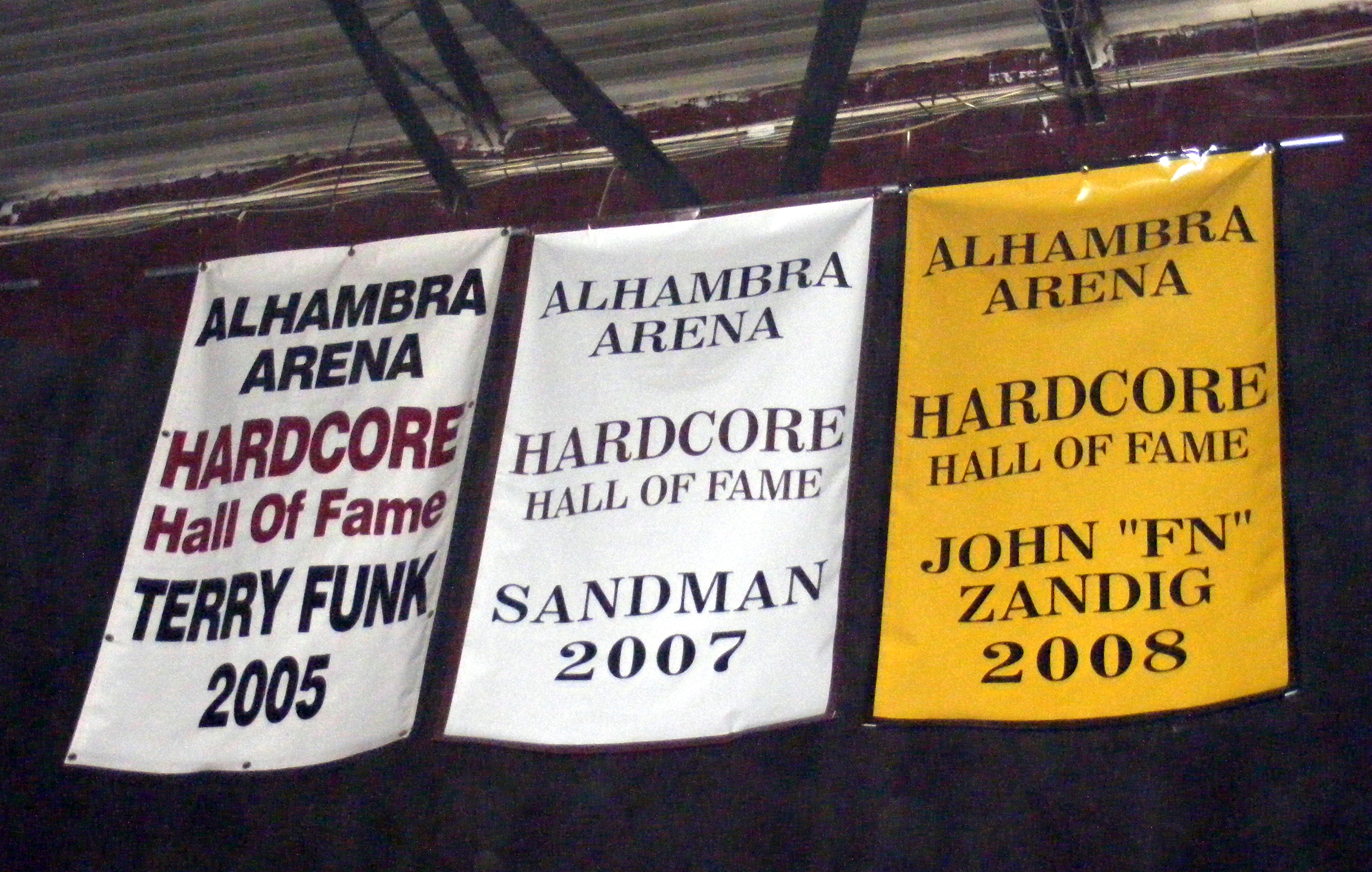
Sandman's Hardcore Hall of Fame banner in the former ECW Arena.

- All Entertainment Action Wrestling
  - AEAW American Heavyweight Championship (2 times)
  - AEAW Hardcore Wrestling Championship (1 time)
- DDT Pro-Wrestling
  - Ironman Heavymetalweight Championship (1 time)
- Eastern Championship Wrestling / Extreme Championship Wrestling
  - ECW World Heavyweight Championship (5 times)^{1}
  - ECW World Tag Team Championship (1 time) – with 2 Cold Scorpio
- Frontier Martial-Arts Wrestling
  - WEW World Tag Team Championship (1 time) – with Kodo Fuyuki
- Future of Wrestling
  - FOW Hardcore Championship (1 time)
- Hardcore Hall of Fame
  - Class of 2007
- International Wrestling Cartel
  - IWC World Heavyweight Championship (1 time)
- Pro Wrestling Illustrated
  - PWI ranked him #60 of the top 500 singles wrestlers in the PWI 500 in 1995
  - PWI ranked him #250 of the 500 best singles wrestlers of the PWI Years in 2003
- Stars and Stripes Championship Wrestling
  - SSCW Heavyweight Championship (1 time)
- Total Nonstop Action Wrestling
  - TNA Hard 10 Tournament (2003)
- USA Pro Wrestling
  - USA Pro United States Championship (1 time)
- Universal Wrestling Federation
  - UWF Universal Heavyweight Championship (1 time)
- Westside Xtreme Wrestling
  - wXw Hardcore Championship (1 time)
- Xtreme Pro Wrestling
  - XPW King of the Deathmatch Championship (1 time)

^{1} The Sandman's first reign occurred while the promotion was an NWA affiliate named Eastern Championship Wrestling, and was prior to the promotion becoming Extreme Championship Wrestling and the title being declared a world title by ECW. Sandman held the title an additional four times after the events.

== Footnotes ==
- Loverro, Thom (2006). The Rise & Fall of ECW: Extreme Championship Wrestling. World Wrestling Entertainment. p. 384. ISBN 1-4165-1058-3.
