= 1992 in professional wrestling =

1992 in professional wrestling describes the year's events in the world of professional wrestling.

== List of notable promotions ==
These promotions held notable events in 1992.

Promotion Name	Abbreviation
All Japan Women's Pro-Wrestling	AJW
Catch Wrestling Association	CWA
Consejo Mundial de Lucha Libre	CMLL
Eastern Championship Wrestling	ECW
Frontier Martial-Arts Wrestling	FMW
New Japan Pro-Wrestling	NJPW
Universal Wrestling Association	UWA
World Championship Wrestling	WCW
World Wrestling Council	WWC
World Wrestling Federation	WWF

== Calendar of notable shows ==
Date	Promotion(s)	Event	Location	Main Event
January 4	WCW; NJPW	WCW/New Japan Supershow II	Tokyo, Japan	Sting and The Great Muta defeated The Steiner Brothers (Rick Steiner and Scott Steiner) in a tag team match
January 19	WWF	Royal Rumble	Albany, New York	Ric Flair won by last eliminating Sid Justice in a 30-man Royal Rumble match for the vacant WWF World Heavyweight Championship
January 21	WCW	Clash of the Champions XVIII	Topeka, Kansas	Sting and Ricky Steamboat defeated Steve Austin and Rick Rude in a tag team match
January 27	UWA	UWA 17th Anniversary Show	Naucalpan, Mexico	Pegasus Kid (c) defeated Villano III (2–1) in a Singles match for the WWF World Light Heavyweight Championship
January 27	WWF	Saturday Night's Main Event	Lubbock, Texas	Hulk Hogan and Sid Justice defeated Ric Flair and The Undertaker in a tag team match
February 25	ECW	Market Street Mayhem	Philadelphia, Pennsylvania	D. C. Drake and J. T. Smith vs. Johnny Hotbody and Larry Winters in a tag team match
February 29	WCW	SuperBrawl II	Milwaukee, Wisconsin	Sting defeated Lex Luger (c) in a Singles match for the WCW World Heavyweight Championship
April 3	CMLL	36. Aniversario de Arena México	Mexico City, Mexico	Blue Panther defeated American Love Machine by disqualification in a Best two-out-of-three falls Lucha de Apuestas mask vs. mask match
April 3	JWP	Burning Drama Chapter 1 ~ Grand Opening (debut event)	Tokyo, Japan	Cutie Suzuki & Mayumi Ozaki defeat Dynamite Kansai & Hikari Fukuoka in a tag team match
April 5	WWF	WrestleMania VIII	Indianapolis, Indiana	Hulk Hogan defeated Sid Justice by disqualification in a Singles match
April 19	WWF	UK Rampage	Sheffield, England, United Kingdom	The British Bulldog defeated Irwin R. Schyster in a Singles match
May 16	FMW	FMW/WWA in Los Angeles	Los Angeles, California	Atsushi Onita, El Hijo del Santo and Tarzan Goto defeat Horace Boulder, Negro Casas and Tim Patterson in a Best Two Out Of Three Falls Six-Man Tag Team Match
May 17	WCW	WrestleWar	Jacksonville, Florida	Sting's Squadron (Sting, Barry Windham, Dustin Rhodes, Ricky Steamboat and Nikita Koloff) defeated The Dangerous Alliance (Steve Austin, Rick Rude, Arn Anderson, Bobby Eaton and Larry Zbyszko) in a WarGames match
June 16 (aired June 22)	WCW	Clash of the Champions XIX	Charleston, South Carolina	Terry Gordy and Steve Williams defeated The Steiner Brothers (Rick Steiner and Scott Steiner) in a NWA World Tag Team Championship tournament quarter finals
June 20	WCW	Beach Blast	Mobile, Alabama	The Steiner Brothers (Rick Steiner and Scott Steiner) (c) fought Terry Gordy and Steve Williams to a time-limit draw in a tag team match for the WCW World Tag Team Championship
July 11	CWA	Euro Catch Festival in Graz	Graz, Austria	Rambo (c) defeated Terry Funk in a Singles match for the CWA World Heavyweight Championship
July 12	WCW	The Great American Bash	Albany, Georgia	Terry Gordy and Steve Williams defeated Dustin Rhodes and Barry Windham in a Tournament final for the inaugural NWA World Tag Team Championship
August 8	WWC	WWC 19th Aniversario	Bayamón, Puerto Rico	Invader #1 defeated Carlos Colón (c) in a Singles match for the WWA World Heavyweight Championship
August 12	NJPW	G1 Climax	Tokyo, Japan	Masahiro Chono defeated Rick Rude in the finals
August 29	LLPW	Debut event	Tokyo, Japan	Shinobu Kandori beats Rumi Kazama in a singles match
August 29	WWF	SummerSlam	London, England, United Kingdom	The British Bulldog defeated Bret Hart (c) in a Singles match for the WWF Intercontinental Championship
September 2	WCW	Clash of the Champions XX	Atlanta, Georgia	Rick Rude, Jake Roberts, Super Invader and Big Van Vader defeated Sting, Nikita Koloff and The Steiner Brothers (Rick Steiner and Scott Steiner) in an Elimination match
September 18	CMLL	CMLL 59th Anniversary Show	Mexico City, Mexico	Atlantis, King Haku and Rayo de Jalisco Jr. defeated El Gran Kabuki, La Fiera and Pierroth Jr. in a Best two-out-of-three falls six-man six-man "Lucha Libre rules" tag team match
September 19	FMW	FMW 3rd Anniversary Show	Yokohama, Japan	Atsushi Onita defeated Tiger Jeet Singh (c) in a No Rope Explosion Barbed Wire Deathmatch for the WWA World Martial Arts Heavyweight Championship
October 21	AJPW	20th Anniversary Show	Tokyo, Japan	Mitsuharu Misawa defeated Toshiaki Kawada in a singles match to retain the Triple Crown Heavyweight Championship
October 25	WCW	Halloween Havoc	Philadelphia, Pennsylvania	Sting defeated Jake Roberts in a Coal Miner's Glove match
October 27	WWF	Saturday Night's Main Event	Terre Haute, Indiana	Bret Hart (c) vs. Papa Shango in a singles match for the WWF World Heavyweight Championship
November 18	WCW	Clash of the Champions XXI	Macon, Georgia	Shane Douglas and Ricky Steamboat defeated Barry Windham and Dustin Rhodes (c) in a tag team match for both the NWA and WCW World Tag Team Championships
November 25	WWF	Survivor Series	Richfield Township, Ohio	Bret Hart (c) defeated Shawn Michaels by submission in a Singles match for the WWF Championship
December 19	CWA	Euro Catch Festival in Bremen	Bremen, Germany	Road Warrior Hawk defeated Rambo (c) in Round 6 in a Singles match for the CWA World Heavyweight Championship
December 28	WCW	Starrcade	Atlanta, Georgia	The Great Muta last eliminated Barry Windham to win Battlebowl II
(c) – denotes defending champion(s)

== Notable events ==
- January 26 - The Tri-State Wrestling Alliance closes down due to financial problems.
- January 26 - Japan Women's Pro-Wrestling closes.
- February 25 – Eastern Championship Wrestling is born in Philadelphia, Pennsylvania.
- April 3 - JWP has their debut event.
- May 15 – Antonio Peña and partners created the Mexican professional wrestling promotion Asistencia Asesoría y Administración (AAA), which would later grow to become one of the dominant promotions in Mexico.
- August 29 - Ladies Legend Pro-Wrestling has their debut event.

== Accomplishments and tournaments ==
=== AJW ===
Accomplishment	Winner	Date won	Notes
Fuji TV Cup Tag Tournament	Aja Kong and Bull Nakano	August 15	
Japan Grand Prix 1992	Aja Kong	August 30	
Tag League The Best 1992	Aja Kong and Kyoko Inoue	December 13	

=== AJPW ===
Accomplishment	Winner	Date won	Notes
Champion Carnival 1992	Stan Hansen	April 17	
World's Strongest Determination League 1992	Toshiaki Kawada and Mitsuharu Misawa	December 4	

=== ECW ===
Accomplishment	Winner	Date won	Notes
ECW Tag Team Championship Tournament	The Super Destroyers (A. J. Petrucci and Doug Stahl)	June 23	

=== WCW ===
Accomplishment	Winner	Date won	Notes
Nintendo Top Ten Challenge Tournament	Rick Rude	May 1	
NWA World Tag Team Championship Tournament	Miracle Violence Connection (Steve Williams and Terry Gordy)	July 12	
King of Cable Tournament	Sting	December 28	
Jesse Ventura Strongest Arms Arm Wrestling Tournament	Van Hammer		

=== WWF ===
Accomplishment	Winner	Date won	Notes
Royal Rumble	Ric Flair	January 19	This was also for the vacant WWF World Heavyweight Championship

== Awards and honors ==
=== Pro Wrestling Illustrated ===
Category	Winner
PWI Wrestler of the Year	Ric Flair
PWI Tag Team of the Year	Terry Gordy and Steve Williams
PWI Match of the Year	Bret Hart vs. The British Bulldog (SummerSlam)
PWI Feud of the Year	The Moondogs (Spot and Cujo) vs. Jerry Lawler and Jeff Jarrett
PWI Most Popular Wrestler of the Year	Sting
PWI Most Hated Wrestler of the Year	Rick Rude
PWI Comeback of the Year	The Ultimate Warrior
PWI Most Improved Wrestler of the Year	Razor Ramon
PWI Most Inspirational Wrestler of the Year	Ron Simmons
PWI Rookie of the Year	Erik Watts
PWI Lifetime Achievement	Stanley Weston
PWI Editor's Award	Paul E. Dangerously

=== Wrestling Observer Newsletter ===
Category	Winner
Wrestler of the Year	Ric Flair
Most Outstanding	Jushin Thunder Liger
Feud of the Year	Jeff Jarrett and Jerry Lawler vs. The Moondogs
Tag Team of the Year	The Miracle Violence Connection (Terry Gordy and Steve Williams)
Most Improved	El Samurai
Best on Interviews	Ric Flair

== Title changes ==
=== ECW ===
ECW World Heavyweight Championship
(Title created)
Date	Winner	Event/Show	Note(s)
April 25	Jimmy Snuka	Live event	Snuka defeated Salvatore Bellomo in a tournament final to become the first ECW Heavyweight Champion.
April 26	Johnny Hotbody	Live event	
July 14	Jimmy Snuka	Live event	
September 30	Don Muraco	Live event	
November 16	The Sandman	Live event	

ECW World Television Championship
(Title created)
Date	Winner	Event/Show	Note(s)
August 12	Johnny Hotbody	Live event	
September 12	Vacant	N/A	Johnny Hotbody legitimately injured his ankle, and as a result, ECW forced him to relinquish the title.
September 30	Glen Osbourne	Live event	

ECW World Tag Team Championship
(Title created)
Date	Winner	Event/Show	Note(s)
June 23	The Super Destroyers (A. J. Petrucci and Doug Stahl)	Live event	

=== NJPW ===
IWGP Heavyweight Championship
Incoming champion – Tatsumi Fujinami
Date	Winner	Event/Show	Note(s)
January 4	Riki Choshu	Super Warriors in Tokyo Dome	
August 16	Keiji Mutoh	G1 Climax Special 1992	

IWGP Tag Team Championship
Incoming champions – Hiroshi Hase and Keiji Mutoh
Date	Winner	Event/Show	Note(s)
March 1	Big, Bad, and Dangerous (Big Van Vader and Crusher Bam Bam Bigelow)	Big Fight Series 1992: New Japan Pro Wrestling 20th Anniversary Show	
June 26	The Steiner Brothers (Rick Steiner and Scott Steiner)	Masters of Wrestling	
November 22	Scott Norton and Tony Halme	Wrestling Scramble 1992: Battle Zone Space I	
December 14	The Hell Raisers (Hawk Warrior and Power Warrior)	Battle Final 1992	

IWGP Junior Heavyweight Championship
Incoming champion – Norio Honaga
Date	Winner	Event/Show	Note(s)
February 8	Jushin Thunder Liger	Live event	
June 26	El Samurai	Live event	
November 22	Último Dragón	Live event	

=== WCW ===
WCW World Heavyweight Championship
Incoming champion – Lex Luger
Date	Winner	Event/Show	Note(s)
February 29	Sting	SuperBrawl II	
July 12	Big Van Vader	The Great American Bash	
August 2	Ron Simmons	Main Event	
December 30	Big Van Vader	House show	

WCW United States Heavyweight Championship
Incoming champion – Rick Rude
Date	Winner	Event/Show	Note(s)
December 1	Vacant	N/A	

WCW United States Tag Team Championship
Incoming champions – The Young Pistols (Steve Armstrong and Tracy Smothers)
Date	Winner	Event/Show	Note(s)
January 14	Big Josh and Ron Simmons	Main Event	Aired on tape delay on February 16.
February 17	Terry Taylor and Greg Valentine	World Championship Wrestling	Aired on tape delay on February 29
May 17	The Fabulous Freebirds (Jimmy Garvin and Michael Hayes)	WrestleWar	
June 25	Dick Slater and The Barbarian	Main Event	
July 31	Deactivated	N/A	

WCW World Television Championship
Incoming champion – Steve Austin
Date	Winner	Event/Show	Note(s)
April 27	Barry Windham	Saturday Night	Aired on tape delay on May 9.
May 23	Steve Austin	WorldWide	Aired on tape delay on June 13.
September 2	Ricky Steamboat	Clash of the Champions XX	
September 29	Scott Steiner	WorldWide	Aired on tape delay on October 3.
November	Vacant	N/A	

WCW Light Heavyweight Championship
Incoming champion – Jushin Thunder Liger
Date	Winner	Event/Show	Note(s)
February 29	Brian Pillman	SuperBrawl II	
June 20	Scotty Flamingo	Beach Blast	
July 5	Brad Armstrong	House show	
September 2	Retired	Clash of the Champions XX: 20th Anniversary	

WCW World Tag Team Championship
Incoming champions – Ricky Steamboat and Dustin Rhodes
Date	Winner	Event/Show	Note(s)
January 16	Arn Anderson and Bobby Eaton	House show	
May 3	The Steiner Brothers (Rick and Scott Steiner)	House show	
July 5	Terry Gordy and Steve Williams	House show	
September 21	Barry Windham and Dustin Rhodes	Saturday Night	Aired on tape delay on September 26.
November 18	Ricky Steamboat and Shane Douglas	Clash of the Champions XXI	

=== WWF ===
WWF World Heavyweight Championship
Incoming champion – Vacant
Date	Winner	Event/Show	Note(s)
January 19	Ric Flair	Royal Rumble	
April 5	Randy Savage	WrestleMania VIII	
September 1	Ric Flair	Prime Time Wrestling	
October 12	Bret Hart	House show	

WWF Intercontinental Championship
Incoming champion – Bret Hart
Date	Winner	Event/Show	Note(s)
January 17	The Mountie	House show	
January 19	Roddy Piper	Royal Rumble	
April 5	Bret Hart	WrestleMania VIII	
August 29	The British Bulldog	SummerSlam	
October 27	Shawn Michaels	Saturday Night's Main Event XXXI	

WWF Tag Team Championship
Incoming champions – The Legion of Doom (Animal and Hawk)
Date	Winner	Event/Show	Note(s)
February 7	Money Inc. (Ted DiBiase and Irwin R. Schyster)	House show	
July 20	The Natural Disasters (Earthquake and Typhoon)	House show	
October 13	Money Inc. (Ted DiBiase and Irwin R. Schyster)	Wrestling Challenge	aired on tape delay on November 1

Million Dollar Championship
Incoming champion – Ted DiBiase
unsanctioned championship
Date	Winner	Event/Show	Note(s)
February 7	Abandoned	House show	

== Births ==
- January 23 – Mark Andrews, British wrestler
- January 26 – Sasha Banks, American female wrestler
- February 3 – Yusaku Ito
- February 14 – Diamante, Mexican luchador
- February 26
  - Ivy Nile
  - Waka Tsukiyama
- February 28 – El Hijo de Pirata Morgan, Mexican luchador
- March 3 – Mandy Leon, American wrestler
- March 14 – Shotzi Blackheart
- April 18 – Jacob Fatu
- May 16 - Omos
- May 19 – Reika Saiki
- June 7 – Sara Lee (died in 2022)
- June 24 – Kagetsu
- June 25 – Dinamic Black
- July 9 – Andrew Everett
- August 4 – Charles Crowley
- August 17 – Paige
- August 20 – Oro Jr., Mexican luchador
- August 25 – Kylie Rae
- September 14 – Penelope Ford
- September 19 – Hyan
- September 23 – Angel Garza, Mexican wrestler
- October 9 – Jay White, New Zealand wrestler
- November 10

- Marshall Von Erich, American wrestler
- Peyton Royce, Australian female wrestler

- December 27 – Yuka Sakazaki
- December 28 – Rachael Ellering, American female wrestler

== Debuts ==
=== Debut Date ===
- January 4 - Yuji Yasuraoka
- January 11 - Michiko Omukai
- February 25 - Stevie Richards
- March - Cibernético
- March 12 - Triple H
- March 20 - GOEMON
- April 3 - Mika Kukahara (JWP)
- April 3 - Mitsue Kobayashi (JWP)
- April 19 - Yuki Ishikawa and Ryūshi Yanagisawa
- July 1 - Edge
- July 13 - Kazunori Yoshida (Eagle Pro)
- July 21 - Tatsuhito Takaiwa
- August 2 - Katsumi Hirano
- August 4 - Candy Okutsu
- September 4 - Taka Michinoku
- September 7 - Men's Teioh
- September 17 - Jun Akiyama
- September 23 - John Bradshaw Layfield
- October 15 - Matt Hardy
- October 16 - Takao Omori
- October 26 - Toshimitsu Naoi
- October 28 - KAMIKAZE
- November 19 - Chaparita ASARI (All Japan Women's), Fusayo Nochi (All Japan Women's) and Yuka Shiina (All Japan Women's)

=== Date Unknown ===
- Kane
- Dieusel Berto

== Retirements ==
- Ben Bassarab (1983–1992)
- Bill Kazmaier (1986–1992)
- Billy Robinson (1955–1992)
- Dino Bravo (1970–1992)
- Don Owen (1930s–1992)
- Eric Embry (1977–October 30, 1992)
- Gene Kiniski (February 13, 1952 – February 25, 1992)
- George Wells (1973–1992)
- Goldie Rogers (1972–1992)
- Ken Patera (1973–1992)
- Leo Burke (1966–1992)
- Nikita Koloff (1984–October 25, 1992)
- Randy Rose (1974–1992)
- Ray Stevens (1950–1992)
- Rockin' Robin (1987–1992)
- Vladimir Petrov (January 1987 – 1992)

== Deaths ==
- February 7 – Buzz Sawyer, American wrestler (b. 1959)
- February 19 – Tojo Yamamoto, American wrestler and manager (b. 1927)
- April 20 – Jimmy Lennon, American wrestling announcer (b. 1913)
- May 11 – René Guajardo, Mexican luchador (b. 1933)
- May 12 – Lenny Montana, American wrestler and actor (b. 1926)
- June 26 – Buddy Rogers, American wrestler (b. 1921)
- July 1 – Uncle Elmer, American wrestler (b. 1937)
- July 14 – Danny McShain, American wrestler (b. 1912)
- September 13 - Dick Huffman, American wrestler (b. 1923)
- September 24:
  - Roy Heffernan, Australian wrestler (b. 1925)
  - Roy Shire, American wrestler (b. 1921)
- October 31 – Joe Dusek, American wrestler (b. 1910)
- December 27 – Motoshi Okuma, Japanese wrestler (b. 1941)

== See also ==
- List of WCW pay-per-view events
- List of WWF pay-per-view events
- List of FMW supercards and pay-per-view events
