= Super Destroyer =

Super Destroyer and similar may mean:

== In professional wrestling ==
- "The Super Destroyer" Hulk Hogan
- "The Super Destroyers" from WCWA - tag team wrestling team
  - "Super Destroyer #2" Bill Irwin
  - "Super Destroyer #1" Scott Irwin
- "Super Destroyer" Don Jardine
- "The Super Destroyers" from ECW - tag team wrestling team
  - "Super Destroyer #1" A. J. Petrucci
  - "Super Destroyer #2" Doug Stahl
- "Super Destroyer" Gary Royal
- "Super Destroyer Mark II" Sgt. Slaughter
- "Super Destroyer 2000" Bison Smith
- "The Super Destroyer" Jack Victory
- "Super Destroyer" Bill Dromo CWA Memphis

== In fiction ==
- SD Lucifer a "superdestroyer", see Lucifer_in_popular_culture

the super destroyer, from the game helldivers 2

== Ships ==
Some ships are informally described as "super-destroyers":

- Destroyer leader subtype of destroyers
- Japanese destroyer Shimakaze (1942)
- Le Fantasque-class destroyer (large destroyers)
- Type 1936A destroyer
- HMS Swift (1907)
