= Kevin Featherstone =

American professional wrestler

Personal information
- Born: February 26, 1971 (age 55) Washington, DC, USA
- Website: Kevin Featherstone on Myspace

Professional wrestling career
- Billed height: 6 ft 3 in (1.91 m)
- Billed weight: 250 lb (110 kg)
- Trained by: Max Thrasher
- Debut: 1987

Kevin Featherstone (born February 26, 1971) is an American professional wrestler who competes in the Mid-Atlantic and East Coast independent circuit. He is a longtime mainstay of the National Wrestling League and House of Pain Wrestling Federation as one-half of Old School with Scott Vaughn. One of the promotion's most dominant and popular tag teams, they have won the HoPWF Tag Team Championship twice and the NWL Tag Team Championship three times. One of their title reigns lasted a record of two years.

Featherstone has also held the NWL Tag Team titles with Spazman Anthony and John Rambo as well as being a former 3-time HoPWF Heavyweight Champion. He is also involved with the promotion's wrestling school.

== Career ==
=== Early life and career ===
Kevin Featherstone was born in Washington, D.C., on February 26, 1971, and later moved to Sterling, Virginia. A wrestling fan growing up, he was fan of "Mr. USA" Tony Atlas and Bruiser Brody. He also recalled that he and his friends would play mock battle royals in his backyard after watching wrestling on Saturday nights. Shortly after graduating high school, he became interested in becoming a professional wrestler himself. He followed up on some newspaper and magazine ads and nearly went to a wrestling camp in North Carolina run by Ivan Koloff. After working the late shift at Pizza Hut, Featherstone was watching late night wrestling at a friend's house when he saw a commercial for Max Thrasher's AWF Training Center in Hanover, Pennsylvania.

Thrasher agreed to train him and Featherstone eventually made his professional debut in 1987. He spent the next several years wrestling on and off in various independent promotions in the Mid-Atlantic and East Coast region, during which time he helped set up rings and other maintenance, until the late 1990s.

=== National Wrestling League and House of Pain Wrestling Federation ===
==== 2001-2003 ====
In early-2001, a friend of Featherstone's did a brief two-week stint for the National Wrestling League and House of Pain Wrestling Federation shortly after graduating from Axl Rotten's Bone Breaker Training Center in Baltimore. Afterwards, he told Featherstone about its "open door" policy and contacted promoter John Rambo. He was invited into the NWL/HoPWF and, after a period of training, joined the promotion within the year.

In one of his earliest matches for the promotion, Featherstone was disqualified in a wild bout against Johnny Dowe in Ben Salem, Pennsylvania when he hit referee Mike DiMuzio. That same month, he took part in a 4 Way Dance with Master of Disaster, Jake "The Machine" Davis and "Epic" Cashis Carter in Ben Salem on August 28, 2001. While he and Cashis Carter were brawling outside the ring, Master of Disaster ended up winning the match via referee decision. On May 18, 2002, Featherstone faced NWL Heavyweight Champion John Rambo in his first "hardcore wrestling" match. The ring ropes and corner were wrapped in barbed wire while 20 lumberjacks stood at ringside.

Featherstone won his first title defeating Spazman Brian Anthony for the HoPWF Heavyweight Championship in Hagerstown, Maryland on October 15, 2002. He held the title for almost 2 months before losing it to Aidean in Greencastle, Pennsylvania on December 7, 2002. At the end of the month, he and Spazman Anthony won the NWL Tag Team Championship from The Highwaymen (Leslie Leatherman and Jake "The Machine" Davis) on December 28, 2002, although their alliance lasted a few weeks when Featherstone was forced to surrender the belts back to Leatherman and Davis when Anthony no-showed a scheduled title defense a week later. On February 8, 2003, he and John Rambo unexpectedly ended The Highwaymen's third title reign and defended the titles for over three months until their loss to Leatherman & Flex Fenom on May 24.

That summer, Featherstone regained the heavyweight title from Latin Tornado in Martinsburg, West Virginia July 8. He won the title once more from Tank Thomas on August 30, being awarded the belt via forfeit, before finally losing the title to Pirate of the Caribbean in a Dog Collar match on September 6, 2003.

==== 2003-2004 ====
Later that year, he began teaming with Scott Vaughn as Old School. They quickly won the HoPWF Tag Team Championship from Snatch Haggis & Shawn Patrick in Blue Ridge Summit, Pennsylvania October 4. They won a 3 Way Dance against the Rage Brothers and The Slackers (Dino Devine & Chad Bowman) in Newville, Pennsylvania on November 13, 2003. A week later, they won another three-way match against the Rage Brothers and Big New Yorkers in Martinsburg. The show was a charity event which raised over $1,000 for a local autistic boy. They remained undefeated for a record 3 months until an injury suffered by Featherstone caused the two to surrender the titles on January 6, 2004.

Featherstone wrestled in a few single matches during the next few months. He wrestled Professor Egon Ecton and Headshrinker Samu in May and, with Scott Vaughn, defeated Egon Ecton & Pirate of the Caribbean in Chambersburg, Pennsylvania at the end of the month. When their successors, Nikolai Volkoff & Morgus the Maniac, were stripped as champions for failing to defend the titles within a 60-day period, Old School regained the belts in a tag team match against R.D. Lov'n & Deuce Donnatelli in Hagerstown on July 3, 2004. On June 19, they defeated Egon Ecton & Pirate of the Caribbean in a rematch in Martinsburg. In Old School's corner was legendary manager Johnny Valiant.

While still HoPWF Tag Team Champions, they attempted but failed to win the vacant NWL Tag Team titles from Buzz Stryker & Morgus The Maniac in Waynesboro, Pennsylvania on October 9. Becoming involved in the promotion's wrestling school, Featherstone took part in single matches at the Superior Pro Wrestling Training Center in downtown Hagerstown. On December 21, he beat Jeremy Shockey, Hal Litzer and Cowboy Cody Daniels in a 4 Way Dance. At the NWL/HoPWF 2004 Year End Award Show, Feathersone defeated Cody Daniels in a singles match.

That same month, Pantera guitarist Dimebag Darrell was killed by a crazed fan for allegedly causing the band's breakup. A longtime heavy metal fan, Featherstone grew his trademark beard in tribute of his passing.

==== 2005 ====
On January 11, 2005, Featherstone won a battle royal. That same night, he lost to Shorty Smalls in a submission match when Smalls caught him in a sleeper hold. A month later, he and Deuce Donnatelli fought to a time limit draw in Hagerstown on February 1. On March 19, he and Scott Vaughn lost the HoPWF Tag Team Championship to The Super Destroyers (A. J. Petrucci & Doug Stahl) in Newville, Pennsylvania. They failed to defeat them in a rematch on April 2.

On August 9, Featherstone and Vaughn were guests on a special edition of Mike Trash's Trash Talking Radio Show. Guest hosting the show was then NWL Cruiserweight Champion "Jackpot" Jimmy Jessup. Both Featherstone and his partner discussed their careers and promoted an upcoming NWL show in Newville which included Johnny Valliant in a one-man comedy show about his wrestling career. Featherstone also partly did a live broadcast from the NWL/HoPWF event he was at and, during the course of the interview, informed Jessup that he'd been stripped of his title for not appearing at the show.

Five months after losing the HoPWF belts, they beat NWL Tag Team Champions The Goodfellos (Shorty Smalls & Deuce Donnatelli) for the titles in Waynesboro on September 10. When Scott Vaughn was unable to appear for a show in Hagerstown three days later, the titles were awarded to Shorty Smalls & Doken. However, they quickly regained the titles within the week. They would hold onto the titles until November 19, 2005, when they were defeated by then HoPWF Tag Team Champions The Goodfellos in a 3 Way Dance with John Rambo & Headshrinker Samu in Newville.

==== 2006 ====
On February 24, 2006, the NWL Tag Team Championship was vacated when Crucial Impact (Doken & Harlen Kano) failed to appear for a scheduled title defence in Hagerstown. The vacant titles were put up in a match between Old School and The A-Team (Gutterboy & Jerkface). Although they lost the match, they won the titles after they were vacated two months later. They defeated not only Crucial Impact but The Latin Connection (Fumar & Latin Lover) and Brooklyn Panther & "Pretty Boy" Chris Cline in a Fatal Four Way match to win the vacant title in Martinsburg on April 29, 2006. Earlier that month, he and Shorty Smalls lost to Brooklyn Panther & Chris Cline in a match for the vacant HoPWF Tag Team Championship.

Old School lost the titles to Wild Boyz ("Pretty Boy" Chris Cline & "Wild Man" Robbie Paige) in Martinsburg on July 15, 2006. Later that year, Featherstone teamed with Corey Bush to beat Harlen Kano & Viper at a show for International Championship Wrestling's "Collision Course" held at the Barber Fitness Center in Quantico Marine Base, Virginia, on September 13, 2006. Theirs was the opening match for a card featuring Virgil, Doink the Clown, Norman Smiley, Disco Inferno, Kip James and Rick Steiner.

== Championships and accomplishments ==
- House of Pain Wrestling Federation
  - HoPWF Heavyweight Championship (3 times)
  - HoPWF Tag Team Championship (2 times) – with Scott Vaughn
- National Wrestling League
  - NWL Tag Team Championship (5 times) – with Spazman Anthony (1), John Rambo (1) and Scott Vaughn (3)
