= ECW Battle of the Belts =

1993 Eastern Championship Wrestling live event

Battle of the Belts
- Promotion(s): Eastern Championship Wrestling; World Wrestling Association
- Date: January 23, 1993
- City: Philadelphia, Pennsylvania, US
- Venue: Radisson Hotel
- Attendance: 670

Event chronology
← Previous; Market Street Mayhem	Next → Super Summer Sizzler Spectacular

Battle of the Belts was an interpromotional professional wrestling live event produced by National Wrestling Alliance member Eastern Championship Wrestling (ECW) and the World Wrestling Association (WWA) on January 23, 1993. The event was held at the Radisson Hotel in Philadelphia, Pennsylvania.

The show saw ECW President Tod Gordon pitted against WWA President Dennis Coralluzzo including, most notably, during the Champion vs. Champion matches. This brief collaboration occurred shortly before their real-life falling out and long-running feud during the mid-1990s. It was also one of the last in-ring appearances of Kerry Von Erich, a surprise substitute for Kevin Sullivan, before Von Erich's suicide the following month.

Seven professional wrestling matches were contested at the event. The main event was an "I Quit" Texas Death match, in which Terry Funk defeated Eddie Gilbert. Also at the event, the ECW Tag Team Champions The Super Destroyers (Super Destroyer #1 and Super Destroyer #2) defeated the WWA Tag Team Champions The Lords of Darkness (Agony and Pain) in a title versus title match, thus retaining the ECW Tag Team Championship and winning the WWA Tag Team Championship. In another title versus title match, the ECW Heavyweight Champion The Sandman took on the WWA Heavyweight Champion The Spider. The match ended in a double disqualification, meaning both men retained their titles. Ray Odyssey retained the WWA Junior Heavyweight Championship against Chris Evans.

== Event ==
=== Preliminary matches ===
Battle of the Belts kicked off with a championship match, in which Ray Odyssey defended the WWA Junior Heavyweight Championship against Chris Evans. Odyssey delivered a missile dropkick and a sunset flip to Evans to pin him and retain the title.

Next, the ECW Tag Team Champions The Super Destroyers (Super Destroyer #1 and Super Destroyer #2) took on the WWA Tag Team Champions Lords of Darkness (Agony and Pain) in a title versus title match. Near the end of the match, managers of both teams got involved and hit opposing teams with weapons. Following that, a double pinfall occurred as one Super Destroyer pinned one Lord of Darkness while the other Lord of Darkness pinned the other Super Destroyer. The referee eventually declared Super Destroyers the winners due to the Super Destroyer being the legal competitor in the ring. As a result, Super Destroyers retained their ECW Tag Team Championship and won the WWA Tag Team Championship.

In the next match, Salvatore Bellomo was scheduled to take on Kevin Sullivan. However, Sullivan did not appear at the event but Woman introduced a masked wrestler in his place to compete against Bellomo. The masked wrestler was revealed to be Kerry Von Erich. The match ended in a double count-out after both men brawled with each other outside the ring.

The fourth contest was a Brass Knuckles Bullrope Cowbell match between Tony Stetson and Johnny Hotbody. Hotbody delivered a low blow to Stetson while Stetson choked him with the rope. Hotbody eventually hit Stetson with a cowbell and controversially pinned Stetson for the win as Stetson had raised his shoulder up at the three-count but the referee still counted to three.

Next, Davey Boy Smith took on The Masked Superstar. Smith delivered a running front powerslam to Superstar for the win.

It was followed by the penultimate match of the event, a title versus title match between the ECW Heavyweight Champion The Sandman and the WWA Heavyweight Champion The Spider. The match ended in a double disqualification after Tod Gordon and Dennis Coralluzzo got involved and the referees got knocked out, resulting in a brawl. As a result, Sandman and Spider retained their respective titles.

=== Main event match ===
The main event was an "I Quit" Texas Death match between Terry Funk and Eddie Gilbert. Near the end of the match, Gilbert's leg was caught in the rope and Funk repeatedly hit him in the leg with the wooden steps, forcing Gilbert to quit.

== Reception ==
Battle of the Events drew a crowd of 670 viewers in attendance.

The event was panned by critics, receiving negative reviews. A reviewer at Crazy Max criticized the entire undercard, stating "nothing before the main event was good in ANY way." He praised the "I Quit" Texas Death match main event as "really good hardcore brawl" and recommended viewers to "fast forward the first hour and a half and get to the main event." He believed that "Funk and Gilbert MADE this show."

Michael Fitzgerald of Blog of Doom praised the co-main event and the "I Quit" Texas Death match. He specifically felt that Funk versus Gilbert was "a really good brawl, and the show needed a good match like this after an evening of bad/so-so ones. It wasn’t a crisp or smoothly executed match from a mechanical perspective, but they did an excellent job of getting across the idea that they were having a wild fight between two people who really didn’t like one another. Blood, brawling and character work were the name of the game here, which was something that ECW would latch onto and use as a way to gain more and more attention as the 90’s wore on. The selling from both wrestlers was on point, with them using the microphone to good effect as a way of creating drama, with both of them playing all the way to the back row both physically and vocally. This probably won’t be for everyone, but if you like your bloody brawls with plenty of selling and character work, then this will be the match for you!" For other matches, Fitzgerald reviewed that "The Indy level wrestlers in the first two matches actually put some effort in, and for this level of wrestling their performances were acceptable. However, once the experienced wrestlers who actually could do better came out, they totally dogged it and the matches they had stunk as a result. The lads in the Bull Rope match seemed to actually care at least, but then their finish got blown and that was that for their contest being worth anything."

According to Inside Pulse reviews, "This show sucked" and was watchable "FOR HISTORICAL PURPOSES ONLY".

Battle of the Belts was the subject of a podcast by The Wrestling Roundtable in 2022, where the hosts reviewed the entire event.

== Aftermath ==
Terry Funk and Eddie Gilbert continued their rivalry after the event as they traded verbal confrontations and physical altercations in segments on ECW's new weekly television show Hardcore TV, eventually leading to a Texas chain match massacre at Super Summer Sizzler Spectacular, which Gilbert won.

== Results ==
No.	Results	Stipulations	Times
1	Ray Odyssey (c) defeated Chris Evans by pinfall	Singles match for the WWA Junior Heavyweight Championship	9:21
2	The Super Destroyers (Super Destroyer #1 and Super Destroyer #2) (with Hunter Q. Robbins III) (c-ECW) defeated The Lords of Darkness (Agony and Pain) (with Tricky Nicky) (c-WWA) via referee decision following a double pinfall	Champions vs. Champions tag team match for the ECW and WWA Tag Team Championships	8:11
3	Kerry von Erich (with Woman) vs. Salvatore Bellomo (with The Cosmic Commander) ended in a double count-out	Singles match	5:52
4	Johnny Hot Body defeated Tony Stetson by pinfall	Brass Knuckles Bullrope Cowbell match	4:39
5	Davey Boy Smith defeated The Masked Superstar by pinfall	Singles match	1:41
6	The Sandman (c-ECW) vs. The Spider (c-WWA) ended in a double disqualification	Champion vs. Champion match for the ECW and WWA Heavyweight Championships	11:55
7	Terry Funk defeated Eddie Gilbert	I Quit Texas Death match	23:26
(c) / – the champion(s) heading into the match
