= Battle of the Belts =

Battle of the Belts may refer to:

- NWA Battle of the Belts, a pro wrestling supercard hosted by Championship Wrestling from Florida from 1985 to 1986
- ECW Battle of the Belts, a pro wrestling supercard hosted by Eastern Championship Wrestling in 1993
- WCW Battle of the Belts, a pro wrestling supercard hosted by Windy City Wrestling from 1994 to 2010
- WWN Battle of the Belts, a pro wrestling supercard hosted by the World Wrestling Network in 2021 and 2024
- AEW Battle of the Belts, a pro wrestling supercard hosted by All Elite Wrestling from 2022 to 2024

== See also ==
- NWA 51st Anniversary Show: Battle of the Belts (1999)
- FIP Eddie Graham Memorial Show: Battle of the Belts (2007, 2009)
