= John Rambo (wrestler) =

American retired professional wrestler

Personal information
- Born: John Kereczman; October 11 Bethlehem, Pennsylvania, United States

Professional wrestling career
- Ring name(s): John Rambo; John Maxwell
- Billed height: 6"4
- Billed weight: 266 lb (121 kg)
- Trained by: Afa; Rocky Johnson
- Debut: 1988
- Retired: 2017

John Kereczman is an American retired professional wrestler and promoter, best known under the ring name John Rambo. He founded House of Pain Wrestling Federation in 1997, based in Pennsylvania. Also worked most of his career for National Wrestling League in Maryland.

== Professional wrestling career ==
Trained by Afa of the Wild Samoans and Rocky Johnson. Kereczman would make his professional wrestling debut in 1988. His well-known gimmick was John Rambo named after Rambo who was played by Sylvester Stallone. On October 23, 1990, John Rambo won the vacated NWL Heavyweight Championship when he defeated Cactus Jack in Guam. He worked in Pacific Northwest Wrestling where he teamed with Col. DeBeers. They won the NWA Pacific Northwest Tag Team Championship defeating Steve Doll and The Grappler. Two weeks alter they dropped the titles back to Doll and The Grappler in steel cage match.

On March 28, 1996, he defeated Jimmy Snuka for the vacated ECCW Championship in Port Alice, British Columbia.

In 1997, Kereczman founded House of Pain Wrestling Federation based in Chambersburg, Pennsylvania.

Also in 1997, he started working for World Xtreme Wrestling based in Allentown, Pennsylvania.

On May 18, 2002, Kereczman faced Kevin Featherstone in the first "hardcore wrestling" match for the promotion. The ring ropes and corner were wrapped in barbed wire while 20 lumberjacks stood at ringside.

He teamed with Headshrinker Samu as the Hippie Extreme Team in 2004 until 2017.

Kereczman retired in 2017.

== Championships and accomplishments ==
- NWA: Extreme Canadian Championship Wrestling
  - NWA/ECCW Heavyweight Championship (1 time)
- House of Pain Wrestling Federation
  - HoPWF Hardcore Championship (1)
- National Wrestling League
  - NWL Heavyweight Championship (7 times)
  - NWL Tag Team Championship (5 times) – with Headshrinker Samu (2), Kevin Featherstone (1), Master of Disaster (1), OGB (1), and Jimmy Smith (1)
- Pacific Northwest Wrestling
  - NWA Pacific Northwest Tag Team Championship (1 time) Colonel DeBeers (1)
