= HoPWF Tag Team Championship =

Professional wrestling tag team championship

Details
- Promotion: House of Pain Wrestling Federation
- Date established: January 20, 1998
- Current champion(s): Killer Studs
- Date won: May 13, 2008
Statistics
- First champion(s): Gutterboy and Randy The Violator
- Most reigns: The Grungers (3); The Highwaymen (3)
- Longest reign: The Highwaymen (266 days)
- Shortest reign: The Big New Yorkers (<1 day)

The HoPWF Tag Team Championship is the top professional wrestling tag team title in the House of Pain Wrestling Federation promotion. It was created on January 20, 1998, when Gutterboy and Randy The Violator defeated Flex Fenom and Shorty Smalls in Hagerstown, Maryland. The title is defended primarily in the Mid-Atlantic and East Coast, most often in Hagerstown, Maryland, but also in Pennsylvania and West Virginia. There are 44 recognized known teams with a total of 54 title reigns.

== Title history ==
Wrestler:	Times:	Date:	Location:	Notes:
Gutterboy and Randy The Violator	1	January 20, 1998	Hagerstown, Maryland	Defeated Flex Fenom and Shorty Smalls to become first tag team champions.
The Beverly Hillbillies (Jack Hammer and Slickyboy)	1	March 3, 1998	Hagerstown, Maryland	
The Grungers (Skank and Gutterboy)	1	March 31, 1998	Hagerstown, Maryland	
The titles are vacated when The Grungers and Professor Egon Ecton lose a 6-man tag team match to John Rambo, Jack Hammer and Fumer on May 16, 1998.
The Grungers	2	June 2, 1998	Hagerstown, Maryland	Won tag team tournament when the last two teams in the semi-finals were disqualified.
Violator and Biggs	1	June 9, 1998	Hagerstown, Maryland	
The Untouchables (Aidean and Flex Fenom)	1	July 14, 1998	Hagerstown, Maryland	
Flex Fenom (2) and Latin Lover	1	October 20, 1998	Hagerstown, Maryland	Defeated Aidean and Mike Lawson.
Morgus the Maniac and Dave Donovan	1	February 2, 1999		
The titles are vacated in April 1999.
The Grungers	3	April 6, 1999		Defeated Steve Vaughn and Jerkface to win vacant titles.
The titles are vacated in Summer 1999.
Kurt Keizer and Jerkface	1	July 27, 1999		Defeated The Highwaymen and Slickboy and OGB in three way dance to win the vacant titles.
Cannonball and Bruiser Blackwell	1	October 9, 1999		
Spazman Brian Anthony and Aidean (2)	1	October 23, 1999		Defeated Cannonball and Bruiser Blackwell and Morgus the Maniac and Hardrock Hamilton in a Triple Threat match.
Jimmy Jessup and The Freak	1	March 14, 2000	Hagerstown, Maryland	
The Highwaymen (Jake Davis and Leslie Leatherman)	1	May 2, 2000	Hagerstown, Maryland	
OGB and The Doc	1	January 23, 2001	Hagerstown, Maryland	
The titles are vacated on March 16, 2001.
Rob Noxious and The American Jackass	1	March 20, 2001		Defeated Chewey and King Tut in tournament final to win the vacant titles.
The titles are vacated on April 10, 2001, when Rob Noxious and American Jackass failed to appear for a scheduled title defense.
The Highwaymen	2	April 10, 2001		Defeated Scott and Slickyboy to win the vacant titles.
The Big New Yorkers (Slicky D and Jerkface)	1	June 19, 2001	Hagerstown, Maryland	
House of Pain Bullies (Skagnetti and Gutterboy)	1	July 4, 2001		Awarded titles when Slicky D failed to arrive.
The Big New Yorkers	2	July 24, 2001	Hagerstown, Maryland	Awarded titles via forfeit when Skagnetti failed to arrive.
Gutterboy (4) and Master of Disaster	1	July 24, 2001	Hagerstown, Maryland	
The titles are vacated in 2001, when Gutterboy retires.
Spazman Anthony and Jake Davis (2)	1	October 16, 2001	Hagerstown, Maryland	Defeated Leslie Leatherman and Flex Fenom to win the vacant titles.
Jack Hammer (2) and Latin Tornado	1	December 29, 2001	Hagerstown, Maryland	
The Untouchables	2	March 9, 2002	Hagerstown, Maryland	
Jack Hammer (3) and Latin Tornado (2)	2	March 22, 2002	Newville, Pennsylvania	
American Jackass (2) and Hyjinx	1	July 4, 2002	Hagerstown, Maryland	Awarded titles via forfeit when Latin Tornado failed to arrive.
Jack Hammer (4) and Duece is Wild	1	July 4, 2002	Hagerstown, Maryland	
"Epic" Cashus Carter and Chuckie Manson	1	December 3, 2002	Hagerstown, Maryland	
Snatch Haggis and The Freak (2)	1	February 1, 2003	Blue Ridge Summit, Pennsylvania	
The Highwaymen	3	March 5, 2003	Greencastle, Pennsylvania	
Snatch Haggis (2) and The Freak (3)	2	May 14, 2003	Newville, Pennsylvania	Awarded titles via forfeit when Leslie Letherman failed to appear.
The Goodfellos (Shorty Smalls and Duece Donatelli)	1	June 23, 2003	Martinsburg, West Virginia	
The Collegiates (Dexter Alexander and Jesse Valentine)	1	August 16, 2003	Blue Ridge Summit, Pennsylvania	
Snatch Haggis (3) and Shawn Patrick	1	September 2, 2003		Awarded titles when Alexander and Valentine surrender the championship.
Old School (Kevin Featherstone and Scott Vaughn)	1	October 4, 2003	Blue Ridge Summit, Pennsylvania	
The titles are vacated on January 6, 2004, when Kevin Featherstone is injured.
Nikolai Volkoff and Morgus The Maniac (2)	1	January 10, 2004	Martinsburg, West Virginia	Defeated Shorty Smallz and Deuce Donnatelli to win the vacant titles.
The titles are vacated on June 24, 2004, when Volkoff and Morgus are stripped for failing to defend the titles within a 60-day period.
Old School	2	July 3, 2004	Hagerstown, Maryland	Defeated R.D. Lov’n and Deuce Donnatelli to win the vacant titles.
The Super Destroyers (A. J. Petrucci and Doug Stahl)	1	March 19, 2005	Newville, Pennsylvania	
The titles are vacated on October 10, 2005, when The Super Destroyers fail to appear for a scheduled title defense.
Savannah Jack and Brooklyn Panther	1	October 10, 2005		Defeated Lawless and Prodigy and Nicholas Tide and Mike Rattick to win the vacant title.
The Goodfellos	2	October 15, 2005	Martinsburg, West Virginia	
Gutterboy and Jason Static	1	December 3, 2005	Waynesboro, Pennsylvania	
The titles are vacated on January 14, 2006, when Gutterboy and Jason Static fail to appear for a scheduled title defense.
Blackhawk and The Freak	1	January 14, 2006		Defeated Jeremy "Izzy" Stone and Chris Cline to win the vacant title.
The titles are vacated on February 11, 2006, when Blackhawk and The Freak fail to appear for a scheduled title defense.
Crucial Impact (Doken and Harlen Kano)	1	February 11, 2006	Waynesboro, Pennsylvania	Defeated Jah King and Justin Cage to win the vacant title.
Brooklyn Panther and Chris Cline	1	April 11, 2006		Defeated Shorty Smalls and Kevin Featherstone to win the vacant title.
The titles are vacated on July 1, 2006.
The Freak and Brooklyn Panther	1	July 22, 2006	Hagerstown, Maryland	Defeated Wild Boyz (Chris Cline and Robbie Paige) to win the vacant title.
The titles are vacated on October 11, 2006.
The Freak and Professor Egon Ecton	1	October 14, 2006	Hagerstown, Maryland	Defeated Chris Cline and Robbie Paige for the vacant title.
The titles are vacated on November 4, 2006, when The Freak failed to appear for a scheduled title defense.
Professor Egon Ecton and OGB	1	November 4, 2006	Hagerstown, Maryland	Defeated Wild Boyz to win the vacant title.
"Wildman" Robbie Paige and Jeremy "Izzy" Stoned	1	April 7, 2007	Hagerstown, Maryland	Defeated Professor Egon Ecton and Mr. Viper for the vacant titles.
The titles are vacated on September 4, 2007, when Jeremy "Izzy" Stoned failed to appear for a scheduled title defense.
Professor Egon Ecton and "Big Time" Cory Bush	1	September 4, 2007	Hagerstown, Maryland	Defeated Robbie Paige and Chris Cline.
Wild Boyz ("Wildman" Robbie Paige and "Pretty Boy" Chris Cline)	1	October 16, 2007	Hagerstown, Maryland	Cory Bush defended the title by himself after his partner Professor Egon Ecton was unable to appear for the match.
Lawless and Tremor	1	October 23, 2007	Hagerstown, Maryland	Defeated Coast-To-Coast (Ray Valasco and Tray Blaylock) when Chris Cline and Robbie Paige were unable to defend the title.
The titles are vacated on March 29, 2008, when Lawless left the promotion.
Latin Hit Squad (Enforcer and Rush)	1	March 29, 2008	Martinsburg, West Virginia	Defeated Bigtime Cory Bush and Tremor for the vacant title.
The titles are vacated on April 26, 2008, when the Latin Hit Squad failed to appear for a scheduled title defense.
Heavy Hitters ("Bigtime" Cory Bush and Tremor)	1	April 26, 2008	Hagerstown, Maryland	Defeated Jeremy "Izzy" Stoned and Brandon Scott to win the vacant title.
Killer Studs (Gustin Uberstud and Brandon Scott)	1	May 13, 2008	Hagerstown, Maryland	
