= Larry Winters =

American professional wrestler and trainer (1956–2015)

Personal information
- Born: April 14, 1956 Philadelphia, Pennsylvania, U.S.
- Died: January 27, 2015 (aged 58) Philadelphia, Pennsylvania, U.S.

Professional wrestling career
- Ring name(s): Larry Winters; Mr. X Kenny Sullivan
- Billed height: 5 ft 10 in (1.78 m)
- Billed weight: 230 lb (100 kg)
- Billed from: Philadelphia, Pennsylvania
- Debut: 1982
- Retired: 2010

Larry Winters (April 14, 1956 – January 27, 2015) was an American professional wrestler and trainer who competed in the Midwest, Mid-Atlantic and East Coast independent circuit during the 1980s and 90s. He has wrestled in the American Wrestling Association, the National Wrestling Alliance, National Wrestling Federation, Pro Wrestling USA and the World Wrestling Council. It was reported on several wrestling websites that Winters died due to a heart attack January 27, 2015.

Winters was also one of the top stars of Joel Goodhart's Tri-State Wrestling Alliance. He and his tag team partner Johnny Hotbody, as the Dog Pound, were the first TWA Tag Team Champions. However, it was his feud with D. C. Drake that brought him national attention in the wrestling world. One of the earliest displays of modern "hardcore wrestling", Bill Apter wrote "professional wrestling would be forever changed due to this escalated level of violence" after watching their first match in 1990.

He was one of many former TWA wrestlers later brought into Eastern Championship Wrestling by Tod Gordon. Teaming with one-time rival Tony Stetson, the two feuded with The Super Destroyers (Doug Stahl & A. J. Petrucci) and The Suicide Blondes (Chris Candido, Johnny Hotbody and Chris Michaels) over the ECW Tag Team Championship before turning on each other. Winters is also credited for training several future ECW stars including Don E. Allen, Glen Osbourne and The Sandman.

== Professional wrestling career ==
=== Early life and career (1982–1990) ===
A native of Philadelphia, Pennsylvania, Larry Winters made his professional debut in 1982. That year, he traveled to the Midwestern United States to appear for Ohio Championship Wrestling's debut show in Maple Heights on November 6, 1982. A three-day weekend supercard, others who appeared on the card included Luis Martinez, J.W. Hawk, J.R. Hogg, Zoltan the Great, Bobby Colt, The Beast, and Bobo Brazil, who was crowned its first champion. While there, he faced one of his first major opponents, Malcolm Monroe and his manager "Mad Dog" Marcial Bovee, in Akron.

On October 28, 1984 Winters made an appearance for the World Wrestling Federation where he lost to Ron Shaw at a house show in Reading, Pennsylvania.

Around 1985, Winters began wrestling for the American Wrestling Association in Minneapolis, Minnesota. Feuding with "The Living Legend" Larry Zbyszko, he later earned the same sobriquet which he used for the majority of his career. Other notable opponents included Nick Bockwinkel, Kendo Nagasaki and Jimmy Garvin. His match with Garvin was later released as part of Wrestling's Greatest Matches series. Winters also took part in tag team as well as singles matches. During the summer of 1985, he teamed with various partners against The Long Riders (Bill & Scott Irwin), Nick Bockwinkel & Ray Stevens, and The Fabulous Freebirds (Michael Hayes, Terry Gordy & Buddy Roberts).

He also made several appearances for short-lived Pro Wrestling USA, specifically shows co-promoted by the AWA and the National Wrestling Alliance, facing Buddy Roberts and Boris Zhukov. On November 24, 1985, at an interpromotional show for AWA and Jim Crockett Promotions, Winters lost to Boris Zhukov at the Civic Center in Baltimore, Maryland.

During the next two years, Winters wrestled for the NWA as well as the World Wrestling Council, World Grand Prix Wrestling. and the National Wrestling Federation. On October 2, 1987, Winters wrestled NWF Heavyweight Champion D. C. "Mad Dog" Drake at the Al Lang Stadium in St. Petersburg, Florida. A year later, he and D. C. Drake were featured in a special documentary on violence in professional wrestling, Scar Wars, which also included Jules Strongbow and Abdullah the Butcher.

During 1988 and 1989, Winters regularly did shows for promoter Jim Crockett in Baltimore. It was during this period that Winters met Joel Goodhart, who was then involved with the Squared Circle Fan Club, which organized bus trips to NWA and independent shows in the Baltimore area. When Goodhart opened the Ringmasters Wrestling School in Northeast Philadelphia, Larry Winters was hired as head trainer.

In the summer of 1990, Winters toured Canada with IWA Championship Wrestling facing David Isley and Jim Folger. He also faced his old rival Larry Zbyszko in the Montreal-based Lutte Internationale.

=== Tri-State Wrestling Alliance (1990–1992) ===
Joel Goodhart began promoting wrestling shows and Winters became one of the earliest stars of the Tri-State Wrestling Alliance following its formation in 1990. Hoping to rekindle their NWF rivalry, Winters was paired against D. C. Drake in a series of wild matches. In their first match together, the brawl reached the balcony level and Winters threw his opponent over the rail and onto the cement floor. Bill Apter, editor of Pro Wrestling Illustrated, wrote the following month that "professional wrestling would be forever changed due to this escalated level of violence". Indeed, similar TWA feuds between Cactus Jack and Eddie Gilbert, Abdullah the Butcher and The Sheik, and Tony Stetson and Johnny Hotbody were equally violent and, in part, inspired the modern style of "hardcore wrestling" later seen in Extreme Championship Wrestling.

On January 27, 1990, Larry Winters beat D. C. Drake in a "stretcher" match at the TWF's Winter Challenge supercard in Philadelphia. On March 31 at Spring Spectacular, Winters lost to Drake in an "I Quit" match lasting 37 minutes. This match was later named by DeathValleyDriver.com as one of the top matches of the decade. On June 9, Winters met Drake in a 6-man elimination tag team match pitting himself, Rockin' Rebel and Tony Stetson against D. C. Drake, Johnny Hotbody and Mondo Kleen. Although Stetson had been eliminated by Johnny Hotbody early in the match, Winters went on to pin Kleen, Hotbody and Drake to win the match.

At Autumn Armageddon, Winters took part in a 20-man "reverse cage battle royal" held at Philadelphia's Penn Hall on September 15. The battle royal included "Bounty Hunter" Max Thrasher, The Cheetah Kid, Crybaby Waldo, Ghetto Blaster, Ron Shaw, Top Gun, and Triton, and was won by Rockin' Rebel. He and Drake later teamed up to beat Jimmy Jannetty & Rockin' Rebel at the Original Sports Bar on December 4, 1990. Winters returned to Original Sports Bar two months later where, on February 24, 1991, he won a battle royal. On March 2, he participated in a "ringmaster rumble" at Winter Challenge II which was won by JT Smith.

Teaming with Johnny Hotbody as The Dog Pound, they defeated The Confederacy (Rockin' Rebel & Jimmy Jannetty) at Spring Spectacular II in Philadelphia on May 18, 1991, to become the first TWA Tag Team Champions. On August 3, The Dog Pound teamed with TWA Heavyweight Champion D. C. Drake at Summer Sizzler II in a 6-man tag team "elimination" match against J.T. Smith, Tony Stetson and C.N. Redd. Bam Bam Bigelow was the special guest referee. Although Drake lost the heavyweight title to Smith, they ended up winning the match when Winters pinned Stetson. Winters and Hotbody lost the tag team titles a month later to The Blackhearts (David Health & Tom Nash) at Autumn Armageddon II on September 21, 1991. D. C. Drake was substituting for Winters and was the man pinned when the titles changed hands. The promotion closed four months later.

=== Eastern Championship Wrestling (1992–1993) ===
Days after Goodhart announced the close of the Tri-State Wrestling Alliance, Winters met with Steve Truitt, Bob Artese and Tod Gordon at Gordon's Philadelphia office. They decided to continue promoting events without Goodhart and began organizing the future Eastern Championship Wrestling. Winters accepted the position of its first booker. While head instructor of Goodhart's wrestling school, Winters had trained several future ECW stars such as Don E. Allen, Glen Osbourne and The Sandman.

Though he proved competent in the role, creative differences between Winters' traditional booking style and Gordon's more radical approach led to his eventual replacement by Eddie Gilbert, who had the necessary contacts and experience needed by the young promotion. In a 2003 shoot interview, Gordon claimed he was upset with a racial-based angle which occurred during the main event of ECW's first show at Philadelphia's Original Sports Bar. Winters and Johnny Hotbody fought D. C. Drake & J. T. Smith to a double disqualification. Originally, they were supposed to spraypaint JT Smith white and D. C. Drake black. Instead, the two left the black paint in the locker room and only painted Smith white. Upset that he was "worked by the boys", Gordon took over as booker until bringing in Eddie Gilbert later that year. The book Hardcore History: The Extremely Unauthorized Story of ECW notes that in this capacity, Winters was “perfectly competent but his old-school attitude contrasted sharply with [owner Tod] Gordon’s radical ideas.”

At ECW's second-ever event, once again at the Original Sports Bar, D. C. Drake and J. T. Smith defeated Winters and Hotbody a month after their last match on March 24, 1992. Over the next few weeks, Winters won victories over Steve Richards, Derrick Domino Max Thrasher and King Kaluha. On June 23, Winters lost an intergender handicap match with Tony Stetson and Vivacious Veronica against Johnny Hotbody, former students Don E. Allen and The Sandman, and Peaches. Winters lost to The Sandman in a single match on July 14. The following night, he and Johnny Hotbody co-won a battle royal and later fought each other to a double disqualification. On August 11, Winters lost to Hotbody in a tournament final to crown the first ECW Television Champion. Hotbody broke his ankle during the match and the title was vacated afterwards. A month later, Winters was featured in Wrestling Superstars.

Briefly teaming with Jimmy Jannetty, the two feuded with King Kaluha & Scott Summers until early-October. He also wrestled Terry Taylor during the summer. Winters & Jannetty fought Chris Michaels & Damien Stone to a double disqualification on October 24. With Tony Stetson, Winters faced Michaels and Stone in a rematch two months later in Morrisville, Pennsylvania and defeated them via countout on December 19, 1992. They also defeated Michaels in a tag team match with The Samoan Warrior at Cabrini College in Radnor on March 12, 1993; that same night, Winters entered a championship tournament for the ECW TV title but lost in the quarterfinals to "Superfly" Jimmy Snuka. Prior to the match, Sunka introduced Eddie Gilbert as his manager. This match was later broadcast on the debut episode of Hardcore TV the following month.

Deciding to team full-time with his old TWA rival, he and Stetson feuded with The Super Destroyers (Super Destroyer #1 & Super Destroyer #2) over the ECW Tag Team Championship including putting up their hair in exchange for a title shot, and finally beat them for the titles in Radnor on April 2. Their reign lasted only one day as they lost the titles to The Suicide Blondes (Chris Candido & Johnny Hotbody) the following night in Philadelphia. On May 14, Winters lost a 6-man tag team match with Glen Osbourne and Tommy Cairo against Hot Stuff International (Eddie Gilbert, Dark Patriot and Don Muraco).

Shortly after losing the tag team titles, Stetson unexpectedly turned on Winters while participating in a 16-man battle royal for the ECW Pennsylvania Championship. On June 19, Winters lost to his former partner in a First Blood match at the Super Summer Sizzler Spectacular at the ECW Arena in South Philadelphia. Winters continued feuding with Stetson for the next two months. Allied with The Sandman, they beat Stetson and Rockin' Rebel in a tag team match and also fought Stetson to a no-contest. In his last appearance, Winters defeated Rockin' Rebel with Stetson in his corner. Winters was one of the many original ex-TWA wrestlers let go from the promotion by Paul Heyman in order to bring in his own wrestlers. Tod Gordon claimed that Winters was released due to his age and his reluctance to engage in more "hardcore"-style wrestling.

He came back later that year and wrestled for a short time as the masked wrestler Mr. X. On October 16, he fought Tommy Cairo in North East, Maryland and teamed with Don E. Allen to beat The Hell Riders in Morrisville a week later. His final match was against The Lumberjack at the ECW Arena on December 4, 1993.

=== Semi-retirement and the independent circuit (2002–2008) ===
After nearly ten years in retirement, Winters began wrestling for local independent promotions in the Philadelphia area. On March 3, 2002, Winters defeated Jeff Rocker for the Cutting Edge Wrestling Federation but lost to Tony Stetson in a lumberjack match for Liberty All-Star Wrestling on April 20. Within three months, however, Winters reunited with Stetson in KAPOW Wrestling to defeat The Badstreet Boys (Christian York & Joey Matthews) and The Well Hung Warriors (Mark Smart & Greg Spitz) in a 3 Way Dance on July 28. A month later, he took part in a two-day card for the Universal Wrestling Federation. On August 16, 2002, Winters defeated Scotty Ice and, the following night, lost to The Sandman.

In 2007, Winters made several appearances for Tod Gordon's Pro Wrestling Unplugged. On October 27, he and one-time rival Larry Zbyszko appeared as a guest on Johnny Kashmere's Batcave segment. That same night, he managed The Best Around (TJ Cannon & Bruce Maxwell) in their victory over The Bosom Buddies (Teddy Fine & Drew Blood) to win the vacant PWU Tag Team Championship. He also managed the team in separate single matches on November 17, 2007. Winters finally joined The Best Around in a 6-man tag team match to defeat Team P.I.T. (Gary Wolfe, Aramis & Annie Social) on January 19, 2008. In one of his last appearance with the promotion, he wrestled The Blue Meanie in Philadelphia on March 15, 2008.

=== TWA Reunion Shows (2009–2010) ===
On October 24, 2009, Winters was one of several former TWA stars who took part in the Tri-State Wrestling Alliance Reunion Show at the Flyers Skate Zone in Voorhees, New Jersey. With former tag team partner Johnny Hotbody in his corner, he defeated Jimmy Jannetty. Former TWA manager Hunter Q. Robbins III was also at ringside scouting Winters.

At the end of the year, a second reunion show was held at St. Matthew's Baptist Church in Williamstown, New Jersey, to collect unwrapped toys for the Toys for Tots program. Winters won his match against King Kaluha via countout. Also headlining the show were The Blue Meanie, Steve Corino and Tony Stetson. On January 31, 2010, he and other TWA wrestlers appeared for "Wiseguy" Jimmy Cicero's "Bodyslam Autism Show" at the Flyers Skate Zone in Voorhees. Winters faced mixed martial artist "Sensei" Paul Lopresti.

After their bout, Winters "invaded" Lopresti's dojo and criticized both his opponent and martial arts in general. As the dojo regularly films its training and sparring sessions, his disruption was caught on tape and made widely available on YouTube and similar video sharing websites. A rematch was signed for the two to meet in a tag team match at the next TWA show in Vorhees on April 11. In a tag team grudge match, Winters and his partner Cujo the Hellhound lost to Lopresti and Michael Bruno when Lopresti forced Cujo to submit. The event was to help raise money for the Adopt a Pet organization.

== Death ==
Winters died from a heart attack on January 27, 2015.

== Championships and accomplishments ==
- Eastern Championship Wrestling
  - ECW Tag Team Championship (1 time) with Tony Stetson
- Hardcore Hall of Fame
  - Class of 2025
- National Wrestling Federation
  - NWF Heavyweight Championship (1 time)
- Tri-State Wrestling Alliance
  - TWA Tag Team Championship (1 time, first) with Johnny Hotbody
- United States Wrestling Federation
  - USWF Heavyweight Championship (1 time)
- Pro Wrestling Illustrated
  - PWI ranked him # 253 of the 500 best singles wrestlers of the PWI 500 in 1993
  - PWI ranked him # 251 of the 500 best singles wrestlers of the PWI 500 in 1992
  - PWI ranked him # 366 of the 500 best singles wrestlers of the PWI 500 in 1991
