= UK Rampage (1992) =

1992 World Wrestling Federation event

UK Rampage 1992
- Promotion: World Wrestling Federation
- Date: 19 April 1992
- City: Sheffield, England
- Venue: Sheffield Arena
- Attendance: 8,000

UK Rampage chronology
| ← Previous; 1991 | Next → 1993 |

WWE in Europe chronology
| ← Previous; Rampage (Birmingham and Glasgow) | Next → Rampage (Stuttgart) |

Television special chronology
| ← Previous; March To WrestleMania VIII | Next → SummerSlam Spectacular |

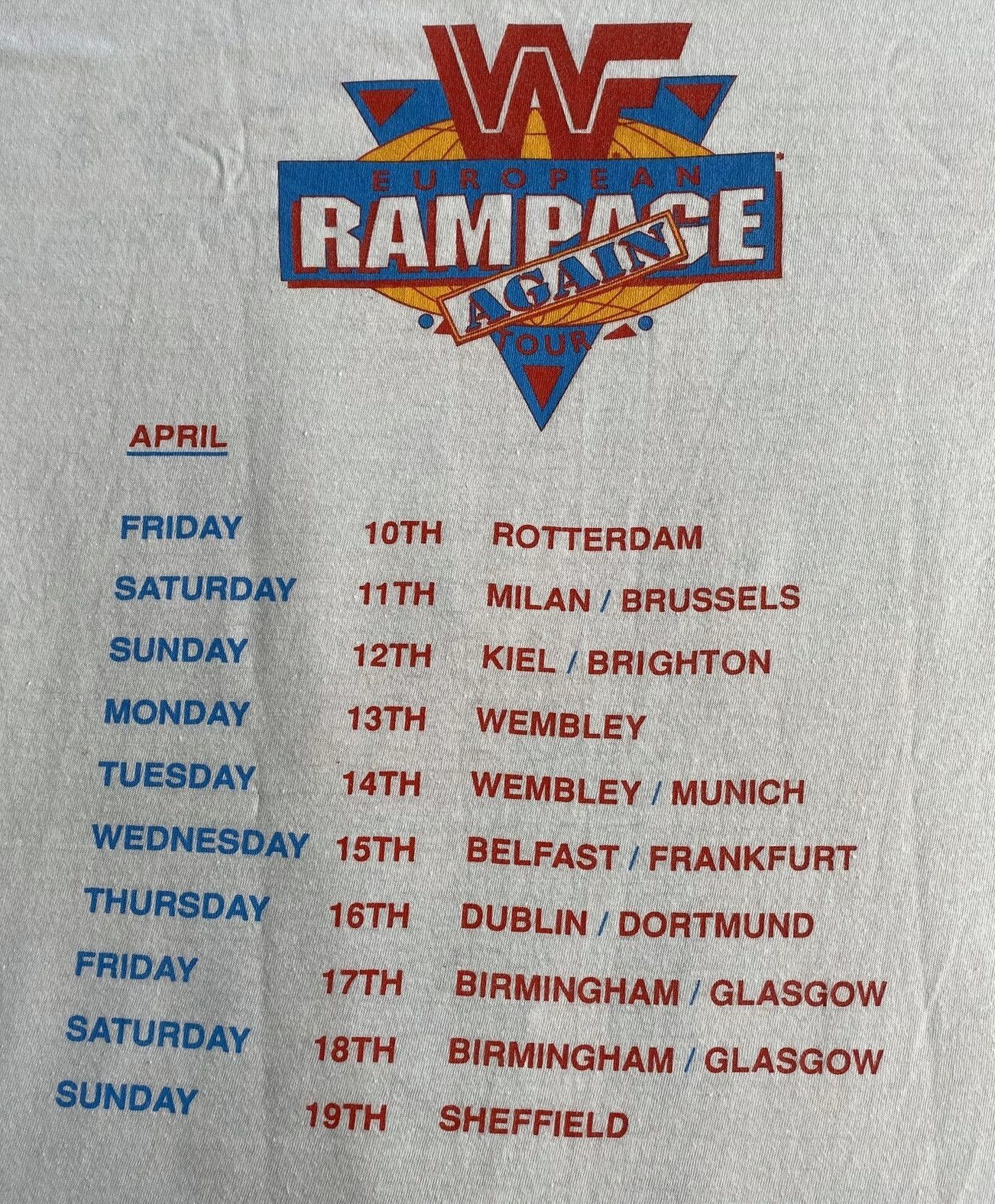
An official WWF t-shirt showing locations and dates of the European Rampage Again Tour

The 1992 UK Rampage event was produced by the World Wrestling Federation (WWF) as part of the company's European Rampage Again Tour. The first event of the tour took place on 12 April 1992 in Brighton and culminated on 19 April 1992 from the Sheffield Arena in Sheffield, England which aired live on Sky Movies Plus and which this article is about. This event marked the final event of that year's European tour, held in various locations across Europe. This was also Miss Elizabeth's final appearance with the WWF.

Some of these matches were shown on Prime Time Wrestling months later. On February 5, 2018, UK Rampage 1992 became available on the WWE Network.

== Event ==
Gorilla Monsoon and Bobby Heenan kick off the show discussing whats to come during the event.

The first match of the event saw Tatanka defeat Skinner. Tatanka hit the tomahawk chop between the eyes, then hit a second one off the middle rope, followed by a back body drop for the win.

Upon returning from break, The Legion of Doom (Hawk and Animal) were interviewed back stage by Sean Mooney about their match coming up against Colonel Mustafa and Dino Bravo. The Legion of Doom would pick up the victory in this match after Hawk hit a clothesline on Mustafa, off the top rope.

Before the next match, Sid Justice was interviewed by Mooney about his match next with The Undertaker. They then switch to Lord Alfred Hayes talking with both Paul Bearer and The Undertaker. As The Undertaker went for the Tombstone, Harvey Wippleman jumped on the ring apron distracting him. The enabled Justice to take control of the match. The two ultimately made their way outside the ring, which enabled Justice to pick up the count-out victory, after as he was able to get back into the ring before the count of 10, although Undertaker was not. After the match, Justice continued to attack Undertaker, including hitting him with a chair. Undertaker however sat up and hit the tombstone on Justice.

They next return to the back where Shawn Michaels discusses how he will defeat Randy Savage for the WWF World Heavyweight Championship. After the referee got knocked out, Savage hit the elbow off the top however there was no one to count. After Sensational Sherri attempted to get involved, Miss Elizabeth came out to stop her. Savage picked up the victory after a high cross body from the top. After the match, Michaels attacked Savage, and as Sherri attempted to jump off the top rope, Savage moved out of the way and Sherri hit Michaels instead.

The Bushwhackers next made their way out and were interviewed by Mooney.

Backstage Hayes interviewed Jimmy Hart and The Mountie about taking on Virgil next. While The Mountie was show boating to the crowd, Virgil was able to regroup and went on the offensive against Mountie. As Virgil went toward the rope, Hart tripped Virgil. While the referee was distracted, Mountie used his taser on Virgil to pick up the victory.

Mooney next interviews Rick Martel about this WWF Intercontinental Championship match next with Bret Hart, followed by Hayes interviewing Hart. As Martel went for a suplex Hart rolled him up into an inside cradle to pick up the victory, and retain the title.

Hayes next is waiting to interview Jim Duggan, who is still in the bathroom when they come back. After their interview, the Repo Man makes his way to the ring to take on Duggan. Duggan, after hitting a scoop slam and hiplock on Repo Man, sent Repo Man out of the ring. Repo Man grabbed his rope and hit Duggan with the hook, resulting in the referee disqualifying him. Following the match Repo Man continued to attack Duggan, however while the referee tried to keep Repo Man away, Duggan grabbed his 2x4 and chased Repo Man to the back.

Mooney backstage talked with Savage and Elizabeth again about their victory earlier in the evening.

While Irwin R. Schyster made his way to the ring, Hayes interviewed The British Bulldog. Schyster then grabbed the mic in the ring and congratulated Sheffield for becoming the tax cheating capital of the world. As Schyster went toward the corner, Bulldog lifted him up, accidentally hitting the referee. Bulldog slammed Schyster out of the corner and covered him for the victory. Following the match, Bulldog celebrated for several minutes with the UK flag in the ring.

== Results ==
| No. | Results | Stipulations | Times |
|---|---|---|---|
| 1^{D} | Alan Kilby defeated Danny Boy Collins | Singles match | — |
| 2 | Tatanka defeated Skinner | Singles match | 11:53 |
| 3 | The Legion of Doom (Hawk and Animal) defeated Colonel Mustafa and Dino Bravo | Tag Team match | 4:29 |
| 4 | Sid Justice (with Harvey Wippleman) defeated The Undertaker (with Paul Bearer) by countout | Singles match | 5:15 |
| 5 | Randy Savage (c) (with Miss Elizabeth) defeated Shawn Michaels (with Sensational Sherri) | Singles match for the WWF Championship | 16:21 |
| 6 | The Mountie (with Jimmy Hart) defeated Virgil | Singles match | 8:57 |
| 7 | Bret Hart (c) defeated Rick Martel | Singles match for the WWF Intercontinental Championship | 13:02 |
| 8 | Jim Duggan defeated Repo Man by disqualification | Singles match | 7:14 |
| 9 | The British Bulldog defeated Irwin R. Schyster (with Jimmy Hart) | Singles match | 12:48 |
(c) / – the champion(s) heading into the match; D / – this was a dark match

== See also ==
- 1992 in professional wrestling
- Professional wrestling in the United Kingdom
