= HoPWF Heavyweight Championship =

Professional wrestling championship

Details
- Promotion: House of Pain Wrestling Federation
- Date established: April 18, 1997
- Current champion(s): "Cocky" Rocky Dicola
- Date won: October 9, 2007
Statistics
- First champion(s): Blackhawk
- Most reigns: Jeff Davis (4); Leslie Leatherman (4)
- Longest reign: Jason Static (582 days)
- Shortest reign: Jimmy Jessup (<1 day)

The HoPWF Heavyweight Championship is the top professional wrestling title in the House of Pain Wrestling Federation promotion. It was created on April 8, 1997, when Blackhawk defeated Skank in Hagerstown, Maryland. The title is defended primarily in the Mid-Atlantic and East Coast, most often in Maryland, but also Pennsylvania and West Virginia. There are 32 recognized known champions with a total of 55 title reigns.

== Title history ==
Wrestler:	Times:	Date:	Location:	Notes:
Blackhawk	1	April 18, 1997	Hagerstown, Maryland	Defeated Skank to become first champion.
Slickyboy	1	M	Hagerstown, Maryland	Defeated Gutterboy in a singles match to win the vacant title.
Jack Hammer	1	March 17, 1998	Hagerstown, Maryland	
Slickyboy	2	June 30, 1998	Hagerstown, Maryland	
Title is vacated in July 1998.
Gutterboy	1	July 7, 1998	Hagerstown, Maryland	Won tournament to win vacant title.
Bart Sawyer	1	July 18, 1998	Hagerstown, Maryland	
Skank	2	July 21, 1998	Hagerstown, Maryland	
Title is vacated.
Blackhawk	2	September 8, 1998	Hagerstown, Maryland	Defeated Slickyboy in a singles match to win the vacant title.
Thor	1	October 20, 1998	Hagerstown, Maryland	
Title is held up.
Thor	2	November 24, 1998		Defeated Blackhawk to win the held up title.
Blackhawk	3	December 5, 1998	Berryville, Virginia	
Ox Hog	1	February 2, 1999	Hagerstown, Maryland	
Morgus the Maniac	1	April 6, 1999	Hagerstown, Maryland	Awarded title via forfeit.
Title is vacated in June 1999.
Brian Anthony	1	June 22, 1999		Awarded vacant title.
Title is vacated on June 29, 1999, when Brian Anthony suffers a knee injury.
Aidean	1	July 6, 1999		Won battle royal to win the vacant title.
Gutterboy	2	November 16, 1999	Hagerstown, Maryland	
Aidean	2	May 2, 2000	Hagerstown, Maryland	
Title is vacated on February 7, 2001, when Aidean suffers a knee injury.
Chewey	1	March 6, 2001		Defeated Chuckie Manson and Jake Davis in three-way match tournament final.
Slickyboy	3	April 3, 2001	Hagerstown, Maryland	Awarded title.
Jake Davis	1	June 12, 2001	Hagerstown, Maryland	
Leslie Leatherman	1	July 4, 2001	Hagerstown, Maryland	Won title in a "No-DQ No Time Limit Lumberjack" match.
Jake Davis	2	July 10, 2001	Hagerstown, Maryland	
Leslie Leatherman	2	July 17, 2001	Hagerstown, Maryland	
Jake Davis	3	July 24, 2001	Hagerstown, Maryland	
Leslie Leatherman	3	July 31, 2001	Hagerstown, Maryland	Won title in a tag team match.
JD Slaughter	1	December 4, 2001	Hagerstown, Maryland	Awarded title when Leatherman failed to appear.
Title is vacated on December 11, 2001, when JD Slaughter is injured during a title defense against NWL Heavyweight Champion John Rambo.
Spazman Anthony	1	December 22, 2001	Hagerstown, Maryland	Won Royal Rumble to win the vacant title.
Jake "The Machine" Davis	4	January 15, 2002	Hagerstown, Maryland	Won title in a 6-man tag team match.
Spazman Anthony	2	April 23, 2002	Hagerstown, Maryland	
Leslie Leatherman	4	August 31, 2002	Blue Ridge Summit, Pennsylvania	
Spazman Anthony	3	September 10, 2002	Hagerstown, Maryland	
Kevin Featherstone	1	October 15, 2002	Hagerstown, Maryland	
Aidean	1	December 7, 2002	Greencastle, Pennsylvania	
Latin Tornado	1	January 11, 2003	Martinsburg, West Virginia	
Aidean	2	February 1, 2003	Blue Ridge Summit, Pennsylvania	
Latin Tornado	2	February 8, 2003	Greencastle, Pennsylvania	
Kevin Featherstone	2	July 19, 2003	Martinsburg, West Virginia	
Tank Thomas	1	August 30, 2003	Hagerstown, Maryland	
Kevin Featherstorm	3	September 2, 2003	Hagerstown, Maryland	Awarded title when Thomas fails to appear.
Pirate of the Caribbean	1	September 6, 2003	Martinsburg, West Virginia	Won title in a Dog Collar match.
Gutterboy	3	February 14, 2004	Blue Ridge Summit, Pennsylvania	
Eagle	1	April 24, 2004	Martinsburg, West Virginia	
Jason Static	1	July 24, 2004	Hagerstown, Maryland	Awarded title by forfeit when Eagle failed to appear.
Shorty Smalls	1	February 25, 2006	Hagerstown, Maryland	
Jerkface	1	July 22, 2006	Hagerstown, Maryland	
Title is vacated on October 3, 2006, when Jerkface fails to appear for a scheduled title defense.
Kevin Featherstone	1	October 3, 2006	Hagerstown, Maryland	Defeated Doken in a singles match to win the vacant title.
Title is vacated.
Professor Egon Ecton	1	November 14, 2006	Hagerstown, Maryland	Won the vacant title in a battle royal.
LT	1	January 27, 2007	Hagerstown, Maryland	
Title is vacated on February 10, 2007, when LT suffers a back injury.
Jeremy Stoned	1	February 10, 2007	Chambersburg, Pennsylvania	Won battle royal.
Professor Egon Ecton	2	April 7, 2007	Hagerstown, Maryland	
"Jackpot" Jimmy Jessup	1	July 3, 2007	Hagerstown, Maryland	
Professor Egon Ecton	3	July 3, 2007	Hagerstown, Maryland	
Title is vacated on October 9, 2007, when Professor Egon Ecton is stripped for failing to appear for a scheduled Triple Threat title defense.
"Cocky" Rocky Dicola	1	October 9, 2007	Hagerstown, Maryland	Defeated Chris Cline to win the vacant title.
