= Jimmy Snuka =

Fijian-American professional wrestler (1943–2017)

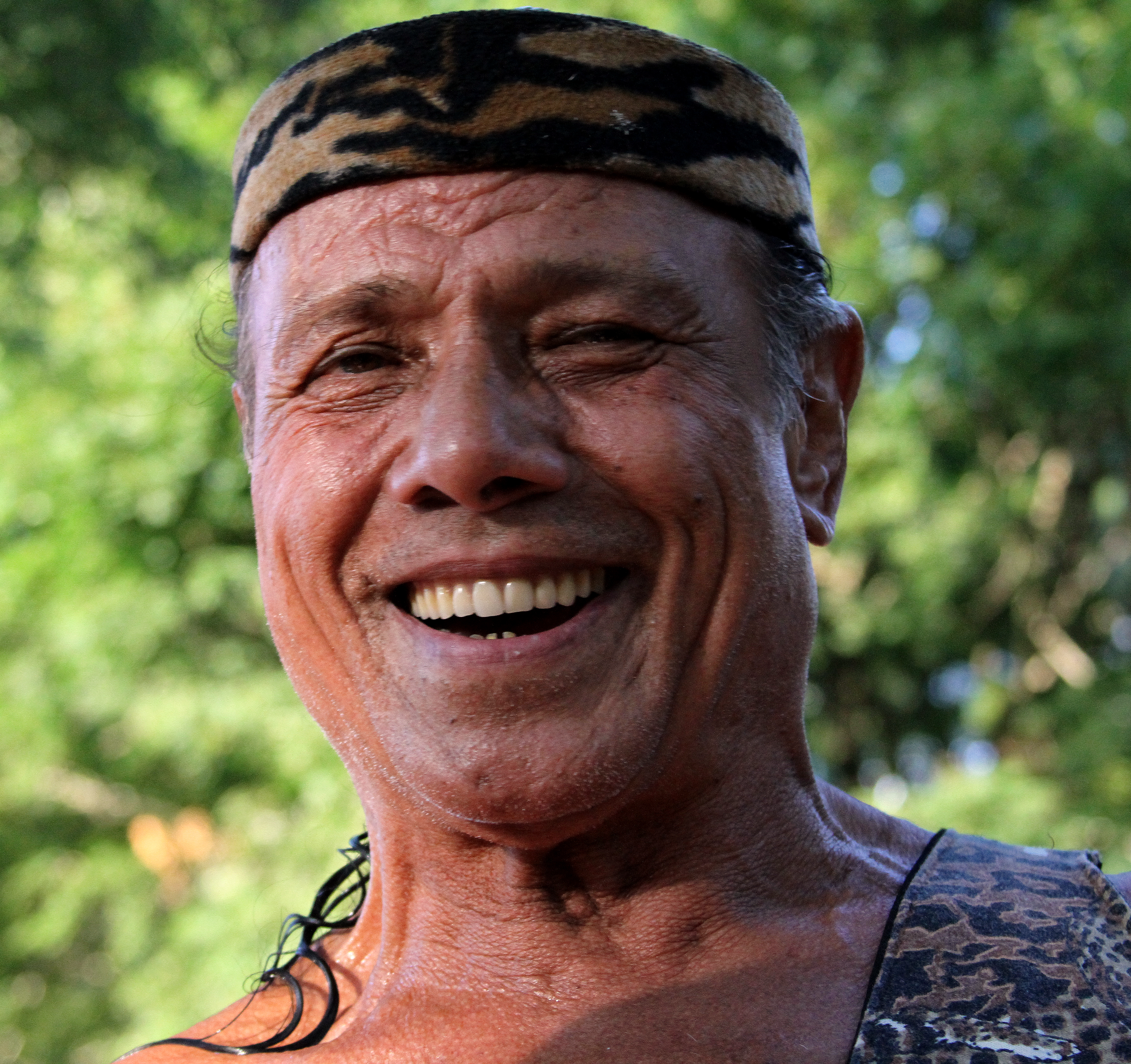
- Snuka in 2011

Personal information
- Born: James Wiley Smith; May 18, 1943 Suva, Colony of Fiji
- Died: January 15, 2017 (aged 73) Coral Springs, Florida, U.S.
- Spouses: Sharon Snuka (m. 1964; div. 1999); Carole Snuka (m. 2004)
- Children: 3, including Jimmy Snuka, Jr. and Tamina
- Family: Anoaʻi

Professional wrestling career
- Ring name(s): Jimmy Snuka; Jimmy Kealoha; Lani Kealoha; Tami Snuka; The Superfly; Big Snuka; Great Snuka
- Billed height: 5 ft 10 in (178 cm)
- Billed weight: 235 lb (107 kg)
- Billed from: The Fiji Islands
- Trained by: Danny Hodge
- Debut: 1968
- Retired: 2015

James Reiher Snuka (Note: Reiher legally changed his surname to Snuka.) (born James Wiley Smith; May 18, 1943 – January 15, 2017) was a Fijian and American professional wrestler, better known by the ring name Jimmy "Superfly" Snuka.

Snuka wrestled for several promotions from the 1970s to 2010s. He was best known for his time in the World Wrestling Federation (WWF, now WWE) in the 1980s to where he was credited with introducing the high-flying wrestling style. He was inducted into the WWF Hall of Fame in 1996, and was the inaugural ECW World Heavyweight Champion (a title he held twice) in Eastern Championship Wrestling (later Extreme Championship Wrestling). His children, Sim Snuka and Tamina Snuka, are both professional wrestlers.

Snuka was indicted and arrested in September 2015 on third-degree murder and involuntary manslaughter charges in relation to the May 1983 death of his girlfriend and mistress, Nancy Argentino, in Allentown, Pennsylvania. He pleaded not guilty, but was found unfit to stand trial in June 2016 due to dementia. Terminally ill with stomach cancer, his charges were dismissed on January 3, 2017, twelve days before his death.

== Early life ==
Snuka was born in the British colony of Fiji on May 18, 1943, to Louisa Smith and Charles Thomas. Thomas was married to another woman, and Smith was engaged to Bernard Reiher. Before Snuka was born, his mother married Reiher. As a child, Snuka moved with his family to the Marshall Islands and then to Hawaii.

Snuka was active in amateur bodybuilding in Hawaii in the 1960s. He also enjoyed some success as a professional bodybuilder, earning the titles of Mr. Hawaii, Mr. Waikiki and Mr. North Shore.

== Professional wrestling career ==
=== Early career (1968–1981) ===
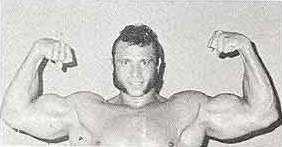
Snuka in 1977

Snuka opted to go into the more lucrative career of professional wrestling due to the uncertainty of his making a living in bodybuilding. While working at Dean Ho's gym in Hawaii, Snuka met many of the wrestlers who worked in the South Pacific region and decided to try the business. Snuka made his debut as Jimmy Kealoha fighting Maxwell "Bunny" Butler in Hawaii in 1970. He later moved to the mainland and wrestled for Don Owen’s NWA Pacific Northwest territory where he held the belt as heavyweight champion six times. He first won the title by pinning Bull Ramos on November 16, 1973. It was in this territory that Reiher transformed himself into Jimmy Snuka. Snuka also held the NWA Pacific Northwest Tag Team Championship six times with partner Dutch Savage. Snuka also had a two-year feud with another rookie, Jesse "the Body" Ventura.

Snuka also wrestled in several other National Wrestling Alliance (NWA) regions, including Texas. In 1977, he won both the Texas heavyweight and tag team titles. Snuka then left for the Mid-Atlantic where he formed a tag team with Paul Orndorff. In their first television match they defeated the NWA World Tag Team champions Jack and Jerry Brisco in a non-title bout. Orndorff and Snuka defeated Baron von Raschke and Greg Valentine to become the tag team title holders in 1979. On September 1, 1979, Snuka defeated Ricky Steamboat to hold the United States title. Snuka also formed a tag team with Ray Stevens while with this promotion. His career eventually led him to Georgia, where he teamed with Terry Gordy to win the NWA National Tag Team Championship by defeating Ted DiBiase and Steve Olsonoski."

=== World Wrestling Federation (1982–1985) ===
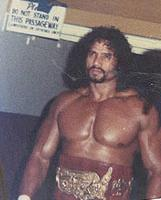
Jimmy Snuka in 1981 at a wrestling event in the Maple Leaf Gardens arena in Toronto, Ontario, Canada

In January 1982, Snuka entered the World Wrestling Federation (WWF) as a villainous character under the guidance of Captain Lou Albano. Snuka lost several title shots at WWF champion Bob Backlund, including a steel cage match at Madison Square Garden on June 28, 1982, in which Snuka leapt from the top of the cage and missed a prone Backlund, who managed to roll out of the way and escape the cage for the win. The contest was declared Match of the Year by Pro Wrestling Illustrated.

Even though Snuka portrayed a violent villain, he won fans because of his athletic style. In a storyline in 1982, Buddy Rogers told Snuka that Albano was cheating him financially, and as a result, Snuka fired Albano. Snuka took on Rogers as his manager during the feud with Albano, Freddie Blassie, and Ray Stevens. The attack solidified Snuka's new role as a fan favorite seeking to settle the score. Snuka defeated Stevens in the majority of the series of matches between the two. He also faced several other of Albano's wrestlers, and defeated Albano in a steel cage match in Madison Square Garden.

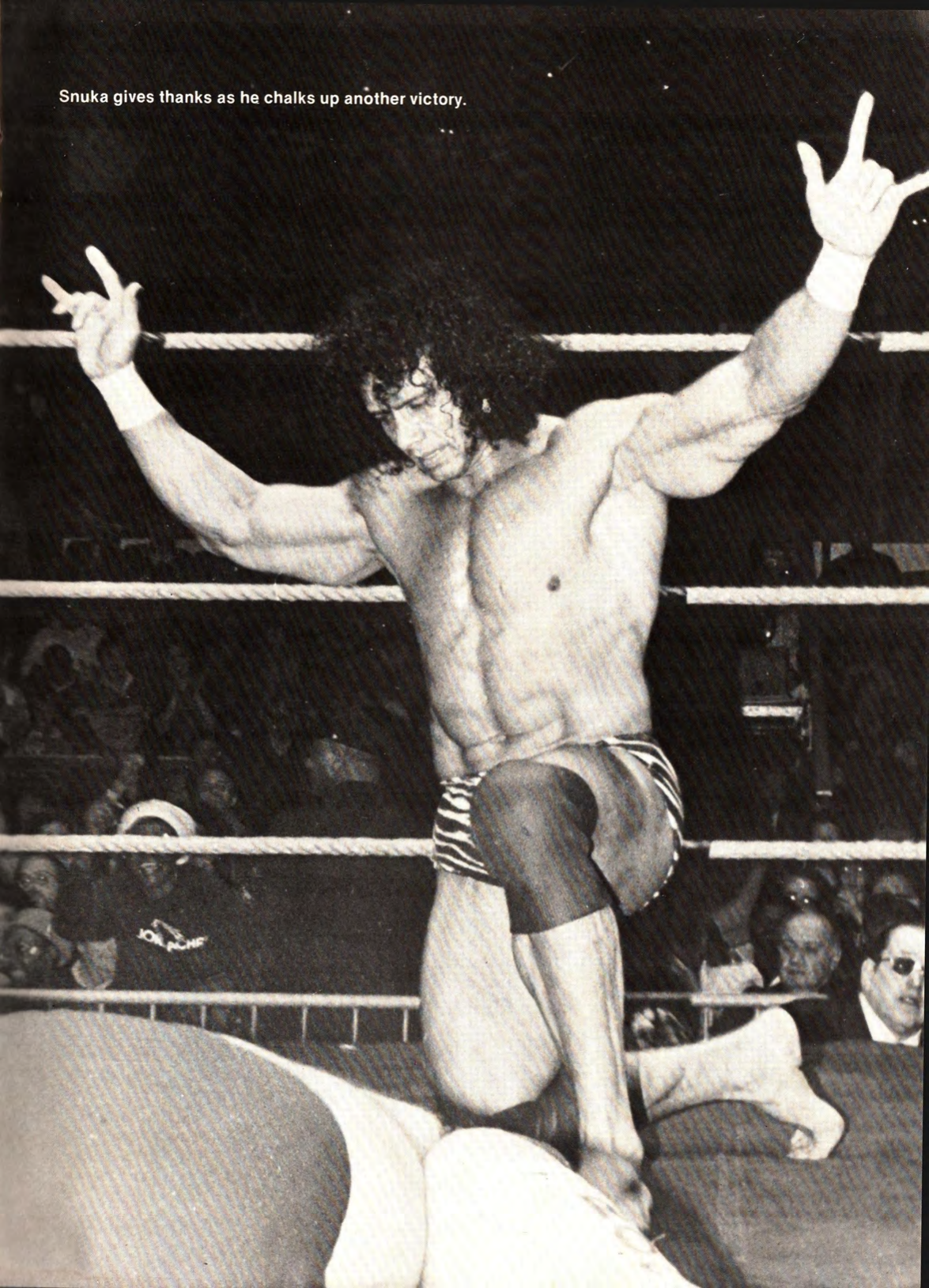
Snuka with his signature kneeling pose, circa 1983

Snuka also feuded with Don Muraco in 1983, which began after Snuka entered the ring for a match against Don Kernodle on the June 18 episode of Championship Wrestling while Muraco, the Intercontinental Heavyweight champion, was being interviewed. Muraco, enraged at the perceived lack of respect, confronted Snuka at ringside, triggering a brawl. This feud led to a defining moment of Snuka's career on October 17, 1983, in a steel cage match at Madison Square Garden. The match ended in a loss for Snuka, but afterward he dragged Muraco back into the ring and connected with the most famous "Superfly splash" of his career, off the top of the 15-foot (4.6 m) high steel cage.

Future wrestling stars the Sandman, Mick Foley, Tommy Dreamer, and Bubba Ray Dudley were all in attendance at the event and cite this match as the reason they decided to actively pursue professional wrestling. Snuka was named the 1983 Wrestler of the Year by Victory Magazine (later renamed WWF Magazine) for his efforts.

In June 1984, Snuka became embroiled in a feud with one of the WWF's top villains, "Rowdy" Roddy Piper. In a segment of Piper's Pit, Piper hit Snuka on the left side of his head very close to the temple, with a coconut. The attack led to a series of grudge matches between the two that were played out over venues across the US throughout the summer of 1984. In late 1984, Snuka entered a rehabilitation facility; the WWF created a storyline in which Piper had broken Snuka's neck by hitting him over the head with a chair. Tonga Kid, who was billed as Snuka's cousin, continued the feud on Snuka's behalf.

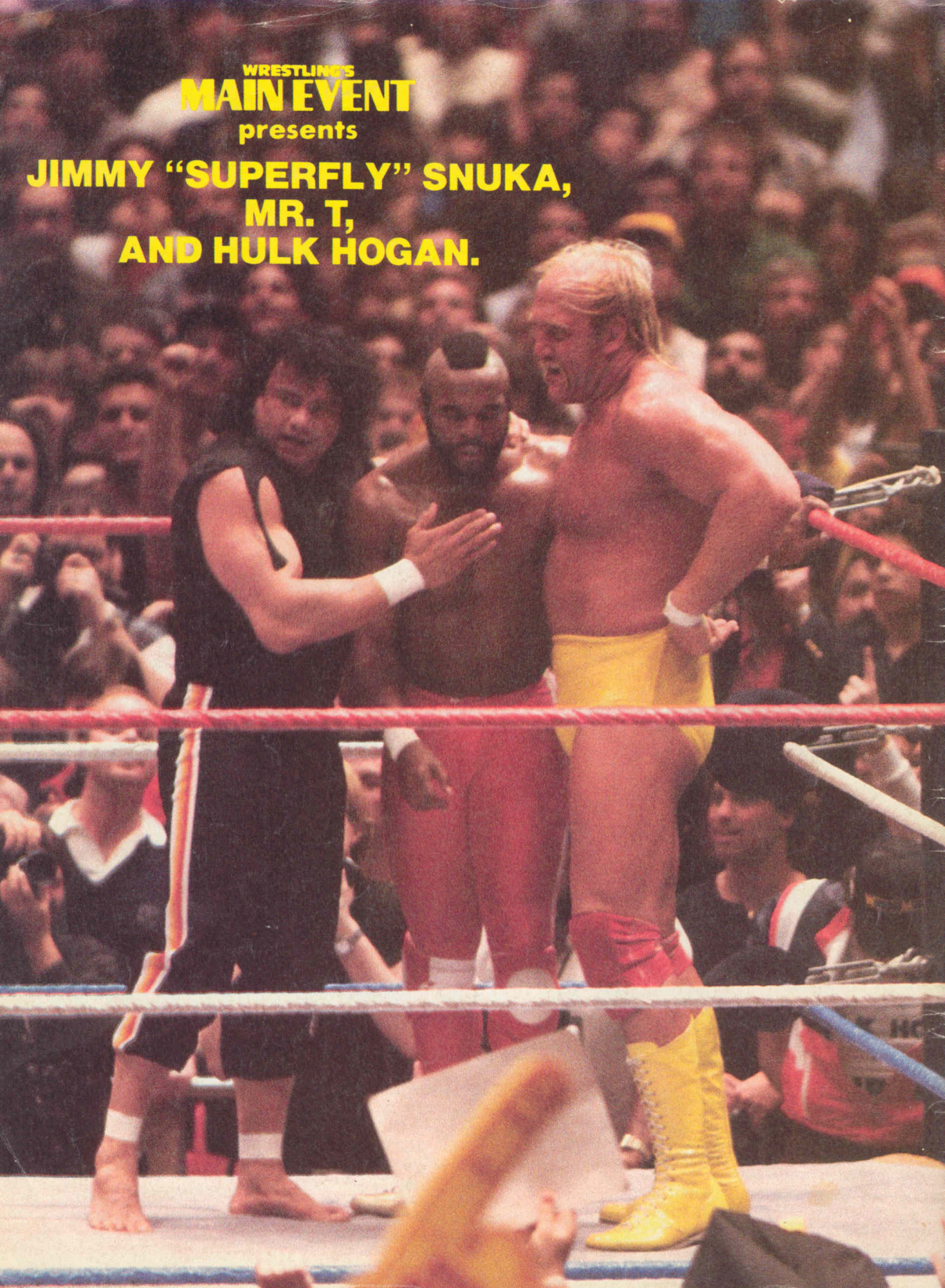
Snuka (left), Mr. T (center) and Hulk Hogan (right) at Wrestlemania, 1985

The remainder of Snuka's initial WWF stint had him frequently tangling with Piper one way or another, often via tag matches or wrestling Piper's closest ally, Bob Orton Jr. Snuka defeated Orton at The War to Settle the Score on February 18, 1985; an injury during the match forced Orton to wear a cast on his left arm, which he continued to wear after the injury healed. The feud played a small part in the first WrestleMania, in March 1985, when Snuka acted as a cornerman for Hulk Hogan and Mr. T when they defeated Piper and Paul Orndorff (with Orton in their corner). Snuka left the WWF in July 1985, though he still appeared in cartoon form when Hulk Hogan's Rock 'n' Wrestling premiered in September.

=== Japan, AWA and more (1985–1988) ===
After spending the rest of 1985 and early 1986 competing for New Japan Pro-Wrestling, Snuka resurfaced in the American Wrestling Association (AWA), replacing Jerry Blackwell as Greg Gagne's partner, to defeat Bruiser Brody and Nord the Barbarian in a tag team cage match at WrestleRock 86.

Snuka split his time between the AWA and Japan throughout 1986 and 1987. His most notable feud in the AWA during that time was with Colonel DeBeers, who portrayed a racist and looked down on Snuka because of his skin color. This led the way for a series of grudge matches in 1987.

Snuka also worked for Pacific Northwest Wrestling and Continental Wrestling Association. In 1988, he worked a couple of matches in Singapore. He wrestled throughout 1988 for All Japan Pro Wrestling, often teaming with Tiger Mask.

=== Return to WWF (1989–1993) ===
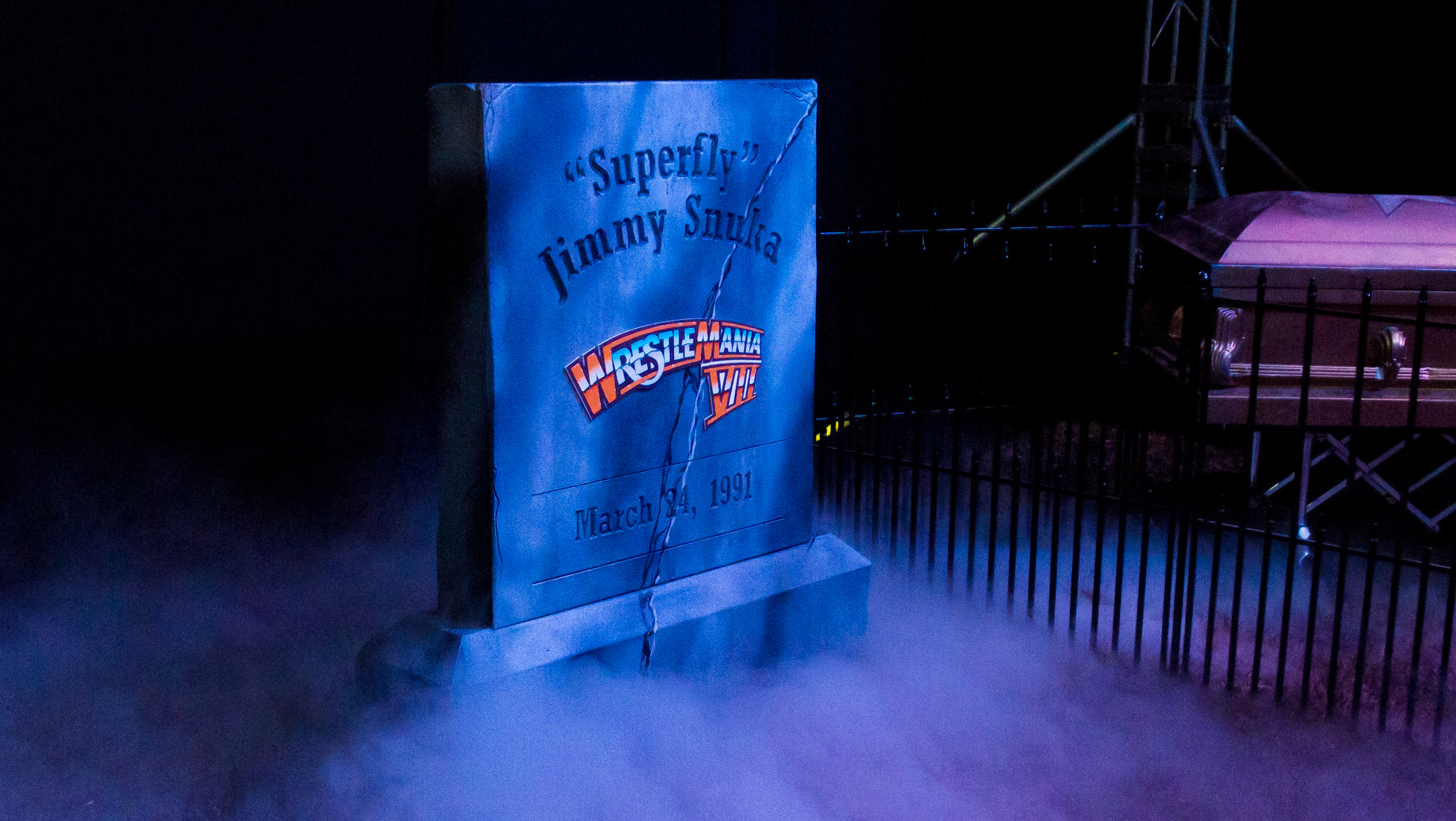
A tombstone commemorating Snuka's loss at WrestleMania VII

Snuka re-emerged in the WWF at WrestleMania V on April 2, 1989. He made his televised return to action on the May 27 episode of Saturday Night's Main Event XXI, defeating Boris Zhukov. After a brief feud with the Honky Tonk Man, Snuka made his in-ring pay-per-view debut at SummerSlam against "Million Dollar Man" Ted DiBiase. Snuka lost the match by count-out as a result of interference from DiBiase's bodyguard Virgil.

By the later part of 1989, Snuka was put into a spot like many veterans before him, being used to help put over other rising stars such as "Mr. Perfect" Curt Hennig. At the Survivor Series, Snuka and Hennig were each the final remaining members of their teams, with Hennig pinning Snuka to win the match for his team. In January 1990, Snuka made his Royal Rumble match debut, lasting 17 minutes and eliminating two competitors before being eliminated by the eventual winner, Hulk Hogan. Snuka had his first WrestleMania match at WrestleMania VI, where he was defeated by Rick Rude. When the Intercontinental Championship was vacated after WrestleMania, Snuka entered the tournament to crown a new champion. He was eliminated in the first round when he once again lost to Mr. Perfect. At that November's Survivor Series, Snuka joined Jake Roberts and the Rockers in a losing effort against Rick Martel, the Warlord and Power and Glory.

On March 24, 1991, Snuka was defeated by the Undertaker at WrestleMania VII, which began Undertaker's undefeated streak at WrestleMania. In January 1992, he competed in the Royal Rumble for the vacant WWF Championship, but lasted only three minutes before being eliminated by Undertaker. Snuka left the WWF soon after, his last recorded match being a loss to Shawn Michaels at the Los Angeles Sports Arena on February 8, 1992.

In the midst of his ECW career, Snuka once again returned to the WWF on September 25, 1993, defeating Brian Christopher at a Madison Square Garden house show. He returned to television two nights later, defeating Paul Van Dale via Superfly Splash on the September 27 episode of Monday Night Raw. The following week on Raw, Snuka participated in a battle royal for the vacant Intercontinental Championship, in which he was eliminated by Rick Martel before departing the company.

=== NWA Eastern Championship Wrestling (1992–1994) ===
==== Heavyweight champion (1992) ====
After leaving the WWF in March 1992, Snuka toured with various smaller organizations and played a role in the formation of Tod Gordon's Philadelphia-based Eastern Championship Wrestling (ECW) organization along with fellow veterans Don Muraco and Terry Funk. Snuka made his ECW debut as a fan favorite at a live event on April 25. He won his first match, a battle royal to qualify for the ECW Heavyweight Championship match against Salvatore Bellomo, the winner of the other battle royal. Immediately after, Snuka defeated Bellomo to become the promotion's first heavyweight champion. A day later, he dropped the title to Johnny Hotbody.

He returned to ECW on July 14, where he defeated Hotbody to regain the heavyweight title, winning it for a second time. He made his first successful title defense, against Mr. Sandman, on July 15. Snuka held the title for the next two months, defeating challengers like Super Destroyer No. 1 and King Kaluha, before losing the title to Muraco on September 30. Snuka unsuccessfully challenged Muraco for the title in a rematch on October 24, after which he turned into a villain by feigning confrontation with color commentator Stately Wayne Manor and then attacking ECW owner Tod Gordon with a chair. Snuka took on Hunter Q. Robbins III as his manager and closed the year with a loss to Davey Boy Smith on December 19.

==== Television champion and various feuds (1993–1994) ====
Snuka became a member of Paul E. Dangerously's new faction Hotstuff International on the debut episode of the company's eponymous television program Eastern Championship Wrestling on April 6 and won an eight-man tournament for the vacant television championship by defeating Larry Winters, the undefeated Tommy Cairo and Glen Osbourne. Snuka frequently teamed with his stablemates Eddie Gilbert and Muraco. Snuka made his first televised title defense against Osbourne on the May 25 episode of Eastern Championship Wrestling, where Snuka retained the title. Snuka successfully defended the title against J.T. Smith and the NWA Pennsylvania Heavyweight champion Tommy Cairo at Super Summer Sizzler Spectacular, while also defending the title on Eastern Championship Wrestling. Snuka lost the title to Terry Funk in a brutal steel cage match at NWA Bloodfest.

Snuka's next notable match took place at The Night the Line Was Crossed in 1994, where he faced rising star Tommy Dreamer in an infamous match. During the match, Dreamer kicked out of a pinfall attempt by Snuka after a Superfly splash, thus marking one of the few times in wrestling history that an opponent kicked out of Snuka's finishing move. Snuka still managed to win by delivering three splashes. Snuka continued his assault on Dreamer after the match, which began a feud between the two. Snuka lost to Dreamer on March 5 before beating him in a steel cage match at Ultimate Jeopardy. Snuka wrestled his last ECW match at Hardcore Heaven in August, where he and the Tazmaniac picked up a tag team victory over the Pitbulls. Later that month, ECW was taken over by Paul Heyman, who renamed it Extreme Championship Wrestling.

=== World Championship Wrestling appearances (1993, 2000) ===
Snuka wrestled for one night at WCW's Slamboree 1993: A Legends' Reunion on May 23, 1993, teaming with Don Muraco and Dick Murdoch against Wahoo McDaniel, Blackjack Mulligan, and Jim Brunzell in a no contest.

Snuka also appeared on WCW Monday Nitro January 10, 2000, where he gave Jeff Jarrett a Superfly splash off the top of a steel cage, giving Jarrett a concussion on the process.

=== Independent circuit and retirement (1995–2015) ===
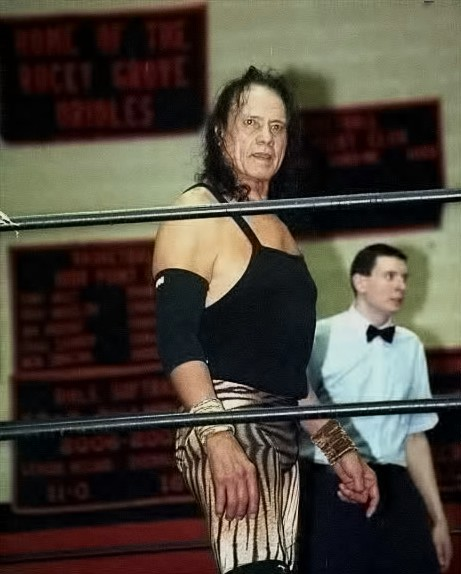
Snuka in March 2009

Snuka continued to spend much of his time with East Coast Wrestling organizations through the mid-1990s and into the 2000s. During this time, he wrestled the Metal Maniac in a series of matches that spanned across many independent wrestling promotions, winning most of these matches. On August 15, 1997, Snuka defeated the Masked Superstar at the IWA Night of the Legends show in Kannapolis, North Carolina via disqualification when his opponent hit special guest referee Ricky Steamboat.

Snuka also participated at the first X Wrestling Federation TV tapings, accompanying his son, Jimmy Snuka Jr. to the ring for matches, including one match where they both delivered a Superfly splash to prone opponents. On June 22, 2002, Snuka won the International Wrestling Superstars (IWS) United States Championship by pin fall against King Kong Bundy in Atlantic City, New Jersey. On April 3, 2004, Snuka and Kamala fought to a no-contest at the International Wrestling Cartel's first-annual "Night Of Legends" event in Franklin, Pennsylvania.

In 2004, Snuka made an appearance for Total Nonstop Action Wrestling at their Victory Road pay-per-view as Piper's guest on Piper's Pit.

On July 1, 2006, Snuka wrestled for 1PW's Fight Club 2 event where he teamed with Darren Burridge to defeat Stevie Lynn and Jay Phoenix.

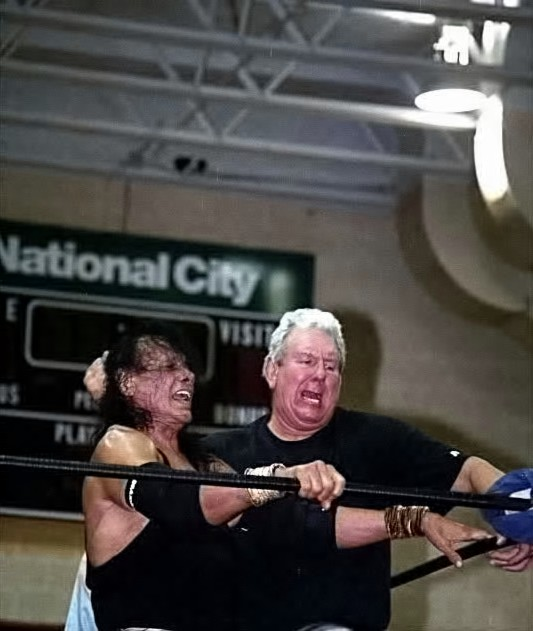
Snuka in a match against Bob Orton Jr. in 2009

On March 28, 2009, Snuka again participated at the IWC's "Night Of Legends" event, where he defeated former rival Orton. On August 1, Snuka teamed with Jon Bolen, Jimmy Vegas, and Michael Facade (with Dominic DeNucci) to defeat James Avery, Logan Shulo, Shane Taylor and Lord Zoltan (with Mayor Mystery) at IWC's "No Excuses 5" in Elizabeth, Pennsylvania. On November 28, 2009, he teamed with his son at an NWA Upstate event in Lockport, New York. They defeated the NWA Upstate Tag Team champions Hellcat and Triple X in a non-title match.

In 2011, Jimmy Snuka competed at JCW: Icons and Legends event in a battle royal match won by Zach Gowen. On May 11, 2014, Snuka teamed up with the Patriot to defeat the team of Brodie Williams and Mr. TA at a Big Time Wrestling event. Snuka's last match was at an ECPW event, where he teamed up with Frankie Flow to defeat the team of Andrew Anderson and Jason Knight on May 15, 2015, just 3 days before his 72nd birthday.

=== Sporadic WWE appearances (1996−2009) ===
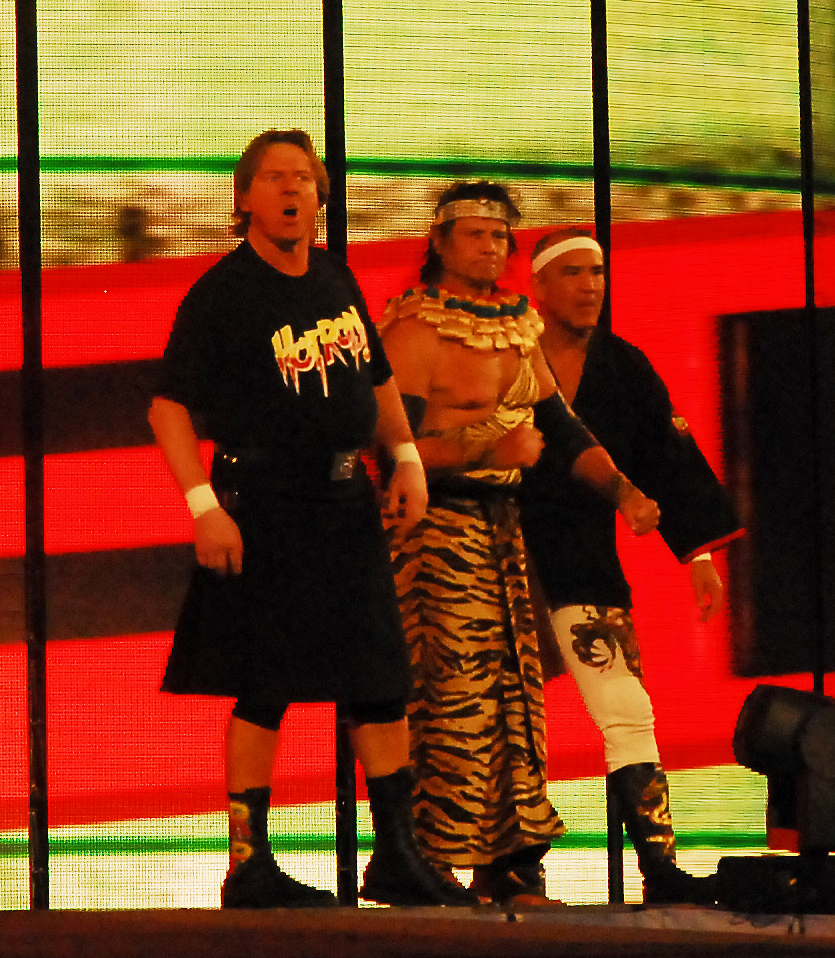
Snuka (center) with Ricky Steamboat (right) and Roddy Piper before their match against Chris Jericho at WrestleMania 25

Snuka was inducted into the WWF Hall of Fame class of 1996. Afterward, he competed at the 1996 Survivor Series. Snuka received a lifetime achievement award from WWE at Madison Square Garden on WWE Raw, August 26, 2002.

In 2005, he appeared at the WWE Homecoming, where he delivered a Superfly splash to Rob Conway. He was a part of the Taboo Tuesday pay-per-view, where fans voted for him (ahead of Kamala and Jim Duggan) to team with Eugene against Conway and Tyson Tomko. Snuka won the match, pinning Conway after a Superfly splash. He appeared at the 2007 WWE draft edition of Raw in a vignette for Vince McMahon appreciation night. On June 24, 2007, Snuka was introduced as Sgt. Slaughter's tag team partner in the open invitational match for the WWE Tag Team Championship at Vengeance, but he was ultimately pinned by his son, Deuce. In 2008, Snuka appeared in the Royal Rumble. He was in the match less than five minutes and primarily focused his efforts on onetime nemesis, Piper. Both were quickly eliminated by the next entrant, Kane.

On the March 2, 2009, episode of Raw, he was attacked by Chris Jericho during a parody of Piper's Pit. This was part of a storyline where Jericho was disrespecting and attacking legends. Two weeks later, on the March 16, 2009, episode of Raw, Snuka, Piper, Ric Flair and Steamboat attacked Jericho. At WrestleMania 25 on April 5, 2009, Snuka teamed with Steamboat and Piper to face Jericho in a legends of WrestleMania handicap match with Flair in their corner. Snuka was the first man eliminated by Jericho, who eventually won the match.

== Personal life ==
Snuka was the part-owner of Body Slam University and Coastal Championship Wrestling in South Florida with Dan Ackerman and Bruno Sassi. He wrote an autobiography, Superfly: The Jimmy Snuka Story, which was released on December 1, 2012.

=== Family ===
Snuka was married three times. His second marriage was to Sharon Ili and they had two daughters Liana Snuka and Sarona. Through his marriage to Sharon, Snuka was part of the Anoaʻi wrestling family. He has two granddaughters named Milaneta Polamalu and Maleata Polamalu and he has a stepdaughter Ata Louise, Sharon's third daughter. His third marriage was to Carole on September 4, 2004. He was the stepfather to Carole's three children: Bridget, Richard, and Dennis.

=== Nancy Argentino's death and murder allegations ===
On May 10, 1983, a few hours after defeating José Estrada at a WWF television taping at the Lehigh County Agricultural Hall in Allentown, Pennsylvania, Snuka placed a call for an ambulance. When emergency personnel arrived at his room at the George Washington Motor Lodge, they found that his girlfriend and mistress, Nancy Argentino, had been injured. She was transported to Allentown's Sacred Heart Medical Center, where she died due to "undetermined craniocerebral injuries." The coroner's report stated that Argentino, 23, died of traumatic brain injuries consistent with a moving head striking a stationary object. Autopsy findings show Argentino had more than two dozen cuts and bruises—a possible sign of serious domestic abuse—on her head, ear, chin, arms, hands, back, buttocks, legs, and feet. Forensic pathologist Isidore Mihalakis, who performed the autopsy, wrote at the time that the case should be investigated as a homicide until proven otherwise. Deputy Lehigh County coroner Wayne Snyder later said, "Upon viewing the body and speaking to the pathologist, I immediately suspected foul play and so notified the district attorney." Snuka had previously been arrested for beating Argentino on January 18, 1983, at a hotel in Salina, New York, fighting off several deputies who were called by the hotel's night manager. Although Argentino initially sought prosecution, she later denied wanting such; in a later-released file from the murder investigation, an officer's note indicates that “Vince McMahon tried to talk her out of making the complaint against Snuka.”

Snuka was the only suspect involved in the subsequent investigation. Although charges were not pressed at the time against Snuka, the case was left officially open. In 1985, Argentino's parents won a $500,000 default judgment against Snuka in U.S. District Court in Philadelphia. Snuka appears not to have ever paid, claiming financial inability. On June 28, 2013, Lehigh County District Attorney Jim Martin announced that the still-open case would be reviewed by his staff. On January 28, 2014, Martin announced that the case had been turned over to a grand jury.

On September 1, 2015, 32 years after the incident, Snuka was arrested and charged with third-degree murder and involuntary manslaughter for Argentino's death. It is the oldest case to result in charges in Lehigh County's history. On October 7, 2015, Snuka's lawyers agreed to forego a preliminary hearing, which the prosecution contended was a waste of court resources, given the thorough grand jury investigation. In return, they received transcripts and other evidence from that investigation, which defense attorney Robert J. Kirwan II said would be much more helpful in preparing Snuka's case than a hearing would have been.

On November 2, 2015, Snuka pleaded not guilty before Judge Kelly Banach. A hearing to determine Snuka's competency for trial began in May 2016. Snuka's attorneys argued that a forensic psychologist found Snuka's mental and physical health to be deteriorating. Prosecutors countered by showing a tape of Snuka performing wrestling moves at a May 2015 match. On June 1, 2016, Banach ruled that Snuka was not mentally competent to stand trial for the murder and that a new hearing would be held six months later to re-evaluate his competency, though his attorneys maintained that his condition would not improve over time. Banach dismissed the charges on January 3, 2017, deeming Snuka mentally unfit to stand trial.

=== Illness and death ===
In August 2015, Snuka's wife, Carole, announced that he was diagnosed with stomach cancer. As a result, he had surgery to remove his lymph nodes, part of his stomach and all apparent cancer. She said they both expected he would fully recover after "a long road ahead". Following his arrest his attorney, William E. Moore, told reporters Snuka had dementia, stemming from wrestling-related injuries, to the point of being unfit for trial, and a judge ultimately agreed.

In July 2016, Carole Snuka, acting as representative for her husband, joined a class action lawsuit filed against WWE which alleged that wrestlers sustained "long term neurological injuries" and that the company "routinely failed to care" for them and "fraudulently misrepresented and concealed" the nature and extent of those injuries. The suit is litigated by attorney Konstantine Kyros, who has been involved in a number of other lawsuits against WWE. According to a court document filed by Kyros in November 2016, Snuka was diagnosed with "chronic traumatic encephalopathy or a similar disease". WWE challenged the filing, stating that "no medical report was included" in it. Since the September 2007 autopsy on Chris Benoit that detected he had CTE, the Kyros Law Firm has represented over 60 wrestlers or estates of deceased wrestlers (including Carole Snuka) in litigation against the WWE. The lawsuit was dismissed by US District Judge Vanessa Lynne Bryant in September 2018.

On December 2, 2016, it was announced that Snuka was in hospice and had six months left to live, due to a terminal illness. He died on January 15, 2017, at age 73 in Pompano Beach, Florida.

== Other media ==
=== Video games ===
Video game appearances
Year	Title	Notes
2001	Legends of Wrestling	Video game debut
2002	Legends of Wrestling II	
2003	WWE SmackDown! Here Comes the Pain	
2004	Showdown: Legends of Wrestling	
2004	WWE SmackDown! vs. Raw	
2005	WWE WrestleMania 21	
2009	WWE Legends of WrestleMania	
2010	WWE SmackDown vs. Raw 2011	
2011	WWE All Stars	

== Championships and accomplishments ==
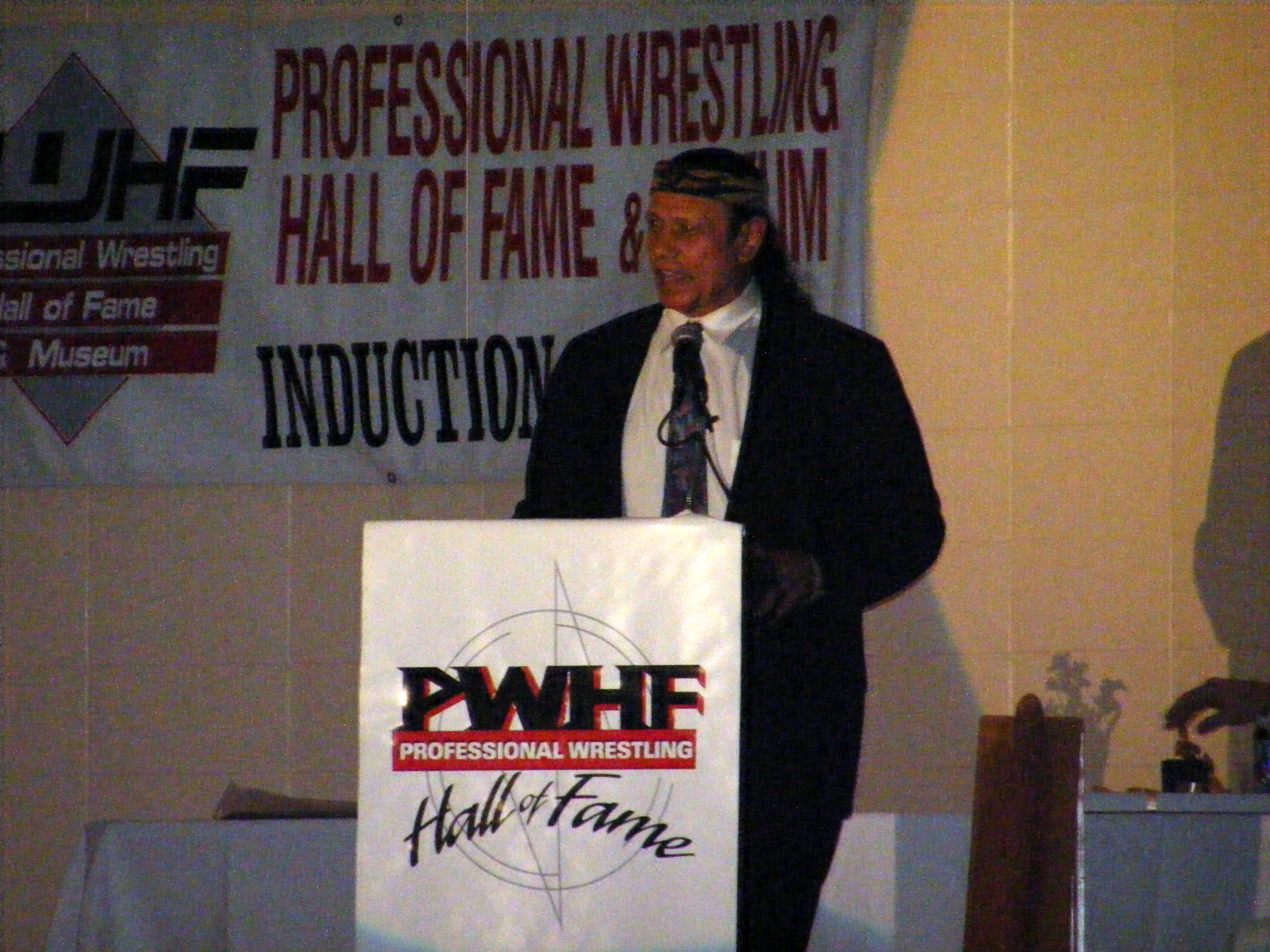
Snuka is an inductee into the Professional Wrestling Hall of Fame and Museum

- All Japan Pro Wrestling
  - World's Strongest Tag Determination League (1981) – with Bruiser Brody
  - World's Strongest Tag Determination League Technique Award (1988) – with Tiger Mask II
- All-Star Wrestling Alliance / American States Wrestling Alliance
  - ASWA Heavyweight Championship (1 time)
- American Wrestling Association
  - AWA Midwest Heavyweight Championship (1 time)
- Catch Wrestling Association
  - CWA British Commonwealth Championship (1 time)
- Cauliflower Alley Club
  - Other honoree (1996)
- Continental Wrestling Association
  - CWA International Tag Team Championship (1 time) – with J. T. Southern
- East Coast Pro Wrestling
  - ECPW Heavyweight Championship (1 time)
- Eastern Championship Wrestling
  - NWA ECW Heavyweight Championship (2 times, inaugural) (Note: Jimmy Snuka's reigns occurred while the promotion was a National Wrestling Alliance affiliate named Eastern Championship Wrestling, and was prior to the promotion becoming Extreme Championship Wrestling and the title being declared a world title by ECW.)
  - NWA ECW Television Championship (1 time)
  - ECW Heavyweight Championship Tournament (1993)
  - ECW Television Championship Tournament (1993)
- Georgia Championship Wrestling
  - NWA National Tag Team Championship (1 time) – with Terry Gordy
- International Wrestling Superstars
  - IWS United States Championship (1 time)
- Mid-Atlantic Championship Wrestling
  - NWA United States Heavyweight Championship (Mid-Atlantic version) (1 time)
  - NWA World Tag Team Championship (Mid-Atlantic version) (2 times) – with Paul Orndorff (1) and Ray Stevens (1)
- National Championship Wrestling
  - NCW Tag Team Championship (1 time) – with Johnny Gunn
- National Wrestling Federation
  - NWF Heavyweight Championship (1 time, final)
- National Wrestling League
  - NWL Heavyweight Championship (1 time)
- Northeast Wrestling
  - NEW Heavyweight Championship (1 time)
- NWA All-Star Wrestling
  - NWA Canadian Tag Team Championship (Vancouver version) (1 time) – with Don Leo Jonathan
- NWA Big Time Wrestling
  - NWA Texas Heavyweight Championship (1 time)
  - NWA Texas Tag Team Championship (1 time) – with Gino Hernandez
- NWA Tri-State Wrestling
  - NWA Tri-State Heavyweight Championship (1 time)
- NWA West Virginia/Ohio
  - NWA West Virginia/Ohio Heavyweight Championship (1 time)
- New England Pro Wrestling Hall of Fame
  - Class of 2010
- Pacific Northwest Wrestling
  - NWA Pacific Northwest Heavyweight Championship (6 times)
  - NWA Pacific Northwest Tag Team Championship (7 times) – with Frankie Laine and Dutch Savage (6)
- Pro Wrestling Illustrated
  - Match of the Year (1982) vs. Bob Backlund in a cage match on June 28
  - Most Popular Wrestler of the Year (1983)
  - Tag Team of the Year (1980) with Ray Stevens
  - Ranked No. 75 of the top 500 singles wrestlers in the PWI 500 in 1993
  - Ranked No. 29 of the top 500 singles wrestlers during the PWI Years in 2003
- Pro Wrestling This Week
  - Wrestler of the Week (January 25–31, 1987)
- Professional Wrestling Hall of Fame
  - Class of 2012
- Ring Around The Northwest Newsletter
  - Tag Team of the Year (1973–1974, 1976) with Dutch Savage
  - Wrestler of the Year (1975)
- Universal Superstars of America
  - USA Heavyweight Championship (2 times)
- USA Pro Wrestling
  - USA Pro New York Heavyweight Championship (1 time)
- World Wide Wrestling Alliance
  - WWWA Heavyweight Championship (1 time)
  - WWWA Intercontinental Championship (1 time)
- World Wrestling Federation
  - WWF Hall of Fame (Class of 1996)
- Wrestling Observer Newsletter
  - Tag Team of the Year (1981) with Terry Gordy
  - Best Flying Wrestler (1981)
  - Best Wrestling Maneuver (1981, 1983) Superfly Splash
  - Most Unimproved (1984)
  - Worst on Interviews (1984)
  - Most Washed Up Wrestler (1984)
