= List of Extreme Championship Wrestling tournaments =

Extreme Championship Wrestling had held a variety of professional wrestling tournaments between 1992 and 2001 that were competed for by wrestlers that were a part of their roster.

== Sporadic tournaments ==
=== ECW Tag Team Championship Tournament (1992) ===
The ECW Tag Team Championship Tournament was a four-team tournament created to crown the first-ever ECW Tag Team Champions on June 23, 1992.

=== ECW Television Championship Tournament (1993) ===
The ECW Television Championship Tournament was an eight-man tournament for the vacated ECW Television Championship on March 12, 1993. The former champion Glen Osbourne was stripped of the title, resulting in the title being decided in the tournament. The tournament aired on television between April 6 and April 20 episodes of Eastern Championship Wrestling.

Quarterfinals
Glen Osbourne	Pin
Johnny Hotbody	Eastern Championship Wrestling (4/6)
Eddie Gilbert	Pin
J.T. Smith	Eastern Championship Wrestling (4/13)
Salvatore Bellomo	Eastern Championship Wrestling (4/6)
Tommy Cairo	Count-out
Jimmy Snuka	Pin
Larry Winters	Eastern Championship Wrestling (4/13)

Semifinals
Glen Osbourne	Reverse Decision
Eddie Gilbert	Eastern Championship Wrestling (4/20)
Tommy Cairo	Eastern Championship Wrestling (4/20)
Jimmy Snuka	Pin

Finals
Glen Osbourne	Eastern Championship Wrestling (4/20)
Jimmy Snuka	Pin

=== ECW Tag Team Championship Tournament (1993) ===
The ECW Tag Team Championship Tournament was a tag team tournament to crown the new ECW Tag Team Champions on August 7 and August 8, 1993 after the titles were vacated when Chris Candido, one half of the champions with Johnny Hotbody left the company for Smoky Mountain Wrestling. The tournament aired on television between the August 17, 1993 and the September 7, 1993 episodes of Eastern Championship Wrestling.

Quarterfinals
Eddie Gilbert and The Dark Patriot	Reverse Decision
Tommy Cairo and J.T. Smith	Eastern Championship Wrestling (8/24)
The Super Destroyers	Forfeit
The Suicide Blondes (Chris Candido and Johnny Hotbody)	Eastern Championship Wrestling (8/24)
The Headhunters	Eastern Championship Wrestling (8/17)
Ivan Koloff and Vladimir Koloff*	DDQ
Salvatore Bellomo and Sandman	Pin
Tony Stetson and Richard Michaels	Eastern Championship Wrestling (8/17)

Semifinals
Eddie Gilbert and The Dark Patriot	Pin
The Super Destroyers	Eastern Championship Wrestling (8/31)
Ivan Koloff and Vladimir Koloff	Eastern Championship Wrestling (8/31)
Salvatore Bellomo and Sandman	Pin

Final
Eddie Gilbert and The Dark Patriot	Pin
Salvatore Bellomo and Sandman	Eastern Championship Wrestling (9/7)

- The match ended in a double disqualification but still Koloffs advanced to the semi-finals.

=== NWA World Heavyweight Championship Tournament ===
The NWA World Heavyweight Championship Tournament was a single-elimination tournament held on August 27, 1994. The tournament was conducted for the vacant NWA World Heavyweight Championship. National Wrestling Alliance decided to crown its new champion in ECW as it was the biggest territory of NWA after World Championship Wrestling withdrew from the NWA in 1993.

=== ECW World Television Championship Tournament (2000) ===
The ECW World Television Championship Tournament was a single-elimination tournament for the vacated ECW World Television Championship after Rob Van Dam was stripped of the title by The Network due to his injury on March 4, 2000. The quarter-final matches took place on March 4, with one between Rhino and Spike Dudley airing on the March 10 episode of ECW on TNN. The semi-final and final matches took place at the Living Dangerously pay-per-view.

=== ECW World Tag Team Championship Tournament (2000) ===
The ECW World Tag Team Championship Tournament was a twelve-team tag team tournament for the vacant ECW World Tag Team Championship held on August 25, 2000. The titles were vacated when one half of the previous champions Justin Credible gave up the titles to challenge for the ECW World Heavyweight Championship at CyberSlam. The tournament matches aired on ECW on TNN and Hardcore TV. The tournament final was a three-way elimination match.

Quarterfinals
Hardcore TV	E. Z. Money and Julio Dinero	Pin
9/2	The Bad Street Boys (Joey Matthews and Christian York)
Hardcore TV	Unholy Alliance (Yoshihiro Tajiri and Mikey Whipwreck)	Pin
9/2	Full Blooded Italians (Little Guido and Tony Mamaluke)
Hardcore TV	Jerry Lynn and Tommy Dreamer	Pin
9/2	Rob Van Dam and Kid Kash
ECW on TNN	Justin Credible and Rhino	Pin
9/1	Sandman and Chilly Willy
Hardcore TV	Simon and Swinger	Pin
9/2	Chris Chetti and Nova
Live Event	Danny Doring and Roadkill	Pin
8/25	The Baldies (Tony DeVito and Angel)
BYE
BYE

Semifinals
ECW on TNN	E. Z. Money and Julio Dinero
9/15	Unholy Alliance	Pin
ECW on TNN	Jerry Lynn and Tommy Dreamer	Pin
9/1	Justin Credible and Rhino
ECW on TNN	Simon and Swinger	Pin
9/1	Danny Doring and Roadkill
BYE
BYE

Finalists
Unholy Alliance
Jerry Lynn and Tommy Dreamer
Simon and Swinger
BYE

Finals
ECW on TNN	Unholy Alliance	Pin*
9/1	Jerry Lynn and Tommy Dreamer/Simon and Swinger

- The final was a three-way elimination match.
