= Hunter Q. Robbins III =

American wrestling manager (c.1967/68–2025)

Personal information
- Born: Robin Hunt; August 7, 1957 Trenton, New Jersey, U.S.
- Died: January 11, 2025 (aged 57)

Professional wrestling career
- Ring name: Hunter Q. Robbins III
- Debut: June 1993

Robin Hunt (c. 1967–1968 – January 11, 2025), better known by the ring-name Hunter Q. Robbins III, was an American professional wrestling manager, known for his time in Eastern Championship Wrestling (ECW) during 1992 and 1993. and Mid-Eastern Wrestling Federation in Baltimore.

Robbins managed a number of teams during his short career, including The Super Destroyers, The Suicide Blonds (LuFisto and Jennifer Blake), Chris Candido, Jimmy Snuka and Sabu during his ECW debut.

Following his wrestling career, he worked in the film industry. He died on January 11, 2025.
