= Doug Stahl =

American professional wrestler (1963–2026)

Personal information
- Born: Douglas Eugene Stahl; February 25, 1963 Hagerstown, Maryland, U.S.
- Died: July 10, 2026 (aged 63) Clear Spring, Maryland, U.S.
- Website: Super Destroyer #2 Stats

Professional wrestling career
- Ring name(s): Black Scorpion; Dirty Doug; Doug Stahl; Doug Superior; Douglas J. Witherspoon; Satanic Warrior; Super Destroyer #2 (ECW)
- Billed height: 6 ft 6 in (1.98 m)
- Billed weight: 325 lb (147 kg)
- Trained by: Afa Anoa'i
- Debut: 1988
- Retired: 2006

Douglas Eugene Stahl (February 25, 1963 – July 10, 2026) was an American professional wrestler who worked in the Independent circuit as one half of the masked Tag team known as The Super Destroyers. The two were best known for their time in Eastern Championship Wrestling where they were first 2-time and longest reigning ECW Tag Team Champions.

== Boxing career ==
Prior to the Super Destroyers forming, Doug Stahl was a Golden Gloves Boxer. Doug started boxing at the age of 14 under the guidance of Dick Hess. Dick Hess made a huge impact on Doug's life during his teenage years and watched over him like a father would. Dick strategically fought Doug to win the Junior USA Championship Heavyweight title at the age of 15 and winning two regional Golden Gloves tournaments at 15 and 17 years old. After highschool, Doug joined the Army and boxed on the Ft. Bragg Boxing team. During a parachute jump, Doug tore the ACL of his left knee and his sports career went on hold.

== Professional wrestling career ==
=== National Wrestling League (1988–1992) ===
==== The Superior Brothers/Satanic Warriors ====
After the Army, Doug met up with Neil Caricofe and they were trained by "The Wild Samoans" in 1988. Doug Stahl originally teamed up with Caricofe as a tag team known as "The Superior Brothers." "Desirable" Doug Superior and "Nasty" Neil Superior were known for their ability to play off of each other during their matches. Not real brothers, they trained and lived together in Allentown, PA. for about a year. They also played a darker tag-team known as the "Satanic Warriors." They toured with the National Wrestling League (NWL) to Hawaii and to Guam and battled against the team of the Fantastics.

Doug and Neil had their differences and split up after a few years. Neil was killed in Ocean City, Maryland in 1996 by 12 O.C. police officers trying to subdue him during an outburst in a motel.

=== Eastern Championship Wrestling (1992–1993) ===
==== The Super Destroyers ====
Doug would become more successful in his career while in Eastern Championship Wrestling where he formed a tag team as a heel with A. J. Petrucci known as "The Super Destroyers". Petrucci would become Super Destroyer #1 while Stahl would become Super Destroyer #2.

==== 1992 ====
The Super Destroyers teamed for the first time on April 26, 1992 when they teamed with HD to face The Pitbulls, Jimmy Jannetty and JT Smith in a 6-man tag team match but the match ended in a double disqualification. On May 19, they defeated The Pitbulls in a match by disqualification. On May 25, they squashed Chris Michaels and John Rock.

On June 23, Super Destroyers had their biggest night in their career. They participated in a tournament to determine the first-ever ECW Tag Team Champions. They defeated Jimmy Jannetty and JT Smith in the semifinals. In the finals, they defeated The Night Breed (Max Thrasher and Glen Osbourne) to become the first-ever ECW Tag Team Champions. This started a rivalry between Super Destroyers and Night Breed. On July 14, the two teams had a rematch for the ECW Tag Team Championship which was the first title defense of Super Destroyers. They defeated Night Breed to retain their titles in the rematch. On August 22, they squashed EZ Ryder and The Super Ninja in a title defense.

On September 12, Super Destroyer #2 faced Rasta the Voodoo Mon in a singles match. The two fought to double countout. On September 30, the two Super Destroyers faced each other for the first time. The two fought each other to a double countout. They moved to tag team competition once again squashing Samoan Warrior and Super Ninja in a title defense on October 2. On October 3, Max Thrasher and Super Destroyers were defeated by The Cream Team (Rip Sawyer & Dave Casanova) and Glen Osbourne in a 6-man tag team match. On October 24, they had a successful title defense against Rip Sawyer and Dave Casanova.

==== 1993 ====
On January 23, 1993, Super Destroyers faced The Lords of Darkness in a title vs. title match where Super Destroyers defended their ECW Tag Team Championship while Lords of Darkness defended their WWA Tag Team Championship. Super Destroyers won the match and the WWA Tag Team Championship. On March 12, they squashed Super Ninja and Canadian Wolfman in a non-title tag team match. On April 2, Tony Stetson and Larry Winters ended the lengthy reign of Super Destroyers over the ECW Tag Team Championship which made Super Destroyers the longest reigning champions reigning over 283 days.

=== Independent Circuit (1993–2006) ===
After leaving ECW, the Super Destroyers went their separate ways. Stahl worked for Pro Wrestling Federation in North Carolina as the Black Scorpion. His last match recorded was in 2006.

== Championships and accomplishments ==
- Eastern Championship Wrestling
  - ECW Tag Team Championship (2 times) - with Super Destroyer #1
  - ECW Tag Team Championship Tournament (1992) - with Super Destroyer #1
- House of Pain Wrestling Federation
  - HoPWF Tag Team Championship (1 time) - with A. J. Petrucci
- National Wrestling League
  - NWL Tag Team Championship (1 time) - with Neil Superior
- World Wrestling Association
  - WWA Tag Team Championship (1 time) - with A. J. Petrucci

== Death ==
Stahl died on July 10, 2026, at the age of 63 in his sleep of heart related issues. He leaves behind a Wife (Lisa), Son (Micheal) and Daughter (Emma)
