= The Super Destroyers =

Professional wrestling tag team

Tag team
- Members: Doug Stahl; A. J. Petrucci; Hunter Q. Robbins III (manager)
- Name: Super Destroyers
- Billed heights: AJ Petrucci: 6 ft 2 in (1.88 m); Doug Stahl: 6 ft 6 in (1.98 m)
- Combined billed weight: 610 lb (280 kg)
- Debut: 1992
- Disbanded: 1993

The Super Destroyers is a professional wrestling Tag team consisting of Doug Stahl and A. J. Petrucci. They both currently perform on Independent circuit and they are best known for their stint in NWA Eastern Championship Wrestling where they were the first and longest reigning tag team champions.

== History ==
=== Eastern Championship Wrestling ===
==== 1992 ====
The Super Destroyers were formed in 1992 in NWA Eastern Championship Wrestling by Doug Stahl and AJ Petrucci. They united together because they thought that this was the only way for them to become popular. They hired Hunter Q. Robbins III as their manager. They were a team of masked super heavyweights. After the formation of their tag team, they quickly participated in a tournament for the ECW Tag Team Championship that was held on June 23, 1992. In the first round, they defeated Jimmy Jannetty and JT Smith. In the final round, they defeated The Night Breed (Glen Osbourne & Max Thrasher) to become the first ECW Tag Team Champions.

The Super Destroyers successfully defended the ECW Tag Team Championship for the first time on July 14.

==== 1993 ====
On January 23, 1993, Super Destroyers defeated the WWA Tag Team Champions Lords of Darkness in a title vs. title match where their ECW Tag Team Championship was also on the line. On the televised shows of ECW, Super Destroyers started a feud with the tag team of Tony Stetson and Larry Winters.

The long reign of Super Destroyers as ECW Tag Team Champions finally ended on April 2 when they dropped the titles to the team of Larry Winters and Tony Stetson. This made Super Destroyers the longest reigning champions with a reign of 282 days. They won their second ECW Tag Team Championship on May 15 from Suicide Blondes but lost the titles to them back at the same day. Their tag team ended when Super Destroyer #1 turned on Super Destroyer #2. Eastern Championship Wrestling was trying to sign another masked super heavyweight tag team named The War Machines to set up a feud between them and the Super Destroyers culminating on a Mask Match on UltraClash (1993), but the War Machines never signed and Eastern Championship Wrestling salvaged the storyline with a feud between the Super Destroyers.

=== Independent circuit ===
==== 2013 ====
On January 26, 2013, the Super Destroyers with Hunter Q captured the DWF/LOCO tag team titles in Philadelphia, Pa. to add another title to their honor roll.

== Championships and accomplishments ==
- Eastern Championship Wrestling
  - NWA ECW Tag Team Championship (2 times)
  - ECW Tag Team Championship Tournament (1992)
- National Wrestling League / House of Pain Wrestling Federation
  - HoPWF Tag Team Championship (1 time)
- World Wrestling Association
  - WWA Tag Team Championship (1 time)
