= A. J. Petrucci =

American wrestler

Personal information
- Born: Anthony J. Petrucci; 1951 (age 74–75) Jim Thorpe, Pennsylvania, U.S.
- Education: Kutztown University of Pennsylvania
- Spouse: Marjorie Gasker
- Children: 2
- Family: Gene Snitsky (cousin)

Professional wrestling career
- Ring name(s): A. J. Petrucci; A. J. Petruzzi; Tony Petrucci; The Bounty Hunter; The Executioner; Fracture Fransberg; Masked Assassin; Pocono Mountain Man; Sheik Fugan; Super Destroyer #1
- Billed height: 6 ft 2 in (1.88 m)
- Billed weight: 250 lb (110 kg)
- Billed from: Jim Thorpe, Pennsylvania
- Trained by: Tony Altomare
- Debut: 1984
- Retired: 2005

Anthony J. Petrucci (born 1951) is an American professional wrestler. He is best known for his appearances with the World Wrestling Federation from 1984 to 1986 as A. J. Petruzzi and for his appearances with Eastern Championship Wrestling from 1991 to 1994 as Super Destroyer #1, one half of the tag team The Super Destroyers.

== Early life ==
Petrucci was born in Jim Thorpe, Pennsylvania. He attended Jim Thorpe High School, where he competed in amateur wrestling, American football, and basketball.

== Professional wrestling career ==
=== World Wrestling Federation (1984–1986) ===
In December 1983, Petrucci enrolled in the World Wrestling Federation's training camp in Orange, Connecticut, where he was trained to wrestle by Tony Altomare. He wrestled his first match in 1984, facing B. Brian Blair in Phillipsburg, New Jersey.

In 1985, Petrucci, as The Masked Assassin, and The Spoiler lost a match against Barry Windham and Mike Rotunda at Madison Square Garden in New York City.

Petrucci was also featured as one of the trainers along with Hulk Hogan for Hillbilly Jim in some early 1985 vignettes when Hillbilly first arrived in the WWF.

=== NWA and Independent circuit (1986–1991) ===
In 1988, he and Ron Shaw formed the Executioners and made their way to Jim Crockett's National Wrestling Alliance to work against the New Breed (Chris Champion and Sean Royal).

=== Eastern Championship Wrestling (1992–1994) ===
In 1991 he formed The Super Destroyers tag team with partner Doug Stahl and manager Hunter Q. Robins III in Eastern Championship Wrestling, which was later renamed to Extreme Championship Wrestling (ECW). While in ECW, the Super Destroyers were crowned the first ECW Tag Team Champions. Both Petrucci and Stahl left the company in 1994, after holding the title twice.

=== Later career (1994–2005) ===
In 1996, Petrucci began to train his cousin and Gene Snitsky and Robb Harper. At this time he also formed the tag team The Darkside Demons, alternating between Snitsky and Harper until he felt they were ready to wrestle on their own. After the passing of his father and the signing of Snitsky to World Wrestling Entertainment, Petrucci returned to wrestling in 2005 with NWL/HOPWL. Petrucci has won the Heavyweight, Television and Tag Team titles with this promotion. In 2005 he was also awarded the Most Inspirational Wrestler of the Year. July 2012 the Super Destroyers, A J Petrucci and Doug Stahl, were inducted in the IPWA hall of fame. Returned to the DWF/LOCO wrestling promotion in New Jersey and Pa. to win the tag team championship titles, which they defended in March. August 3 the Super Destroyers won the tag team titles at Super Star wrestling in Dillsburg Pa. making them the unifyed Pa. tag team champions.

== Personal life ==
Petrucci is married to Marjorie Petrucci (née Gasker). The couple have two children, Jason and Suzanne.

Petrucci graduated from Kutztown University of Pennsylvania with a B.S. in Criminal Justice. When he is not wrestling, he works as a counselor for troubled and runaway clients. He was recognized for 10 years of service at Valley Youth House as a counselor.

Petrucci is the cousin of fellow professional wrestler Gene Snitsky, who he trained.

== Championships and accomplishments ==
- DWF/LOCO wrestling
  - DWF/LOCO wrestling Tag Team championship (1 time)
- Eastern Championship Wrestling
  - ECW Tag Team Championship (2 times) – with Super Destroyer #2
  - ECW Tag Team Championship Tournament (1992) – with Super Destroyer #2
- National Wrestling League / House of Pain Wrestling Federation
  - NWL Heavyweight Championship (1 time)
  - HoPWF Tag Team Championship (1 time) – with Doug Stahl
- World Wrestling Association
  - WWA Tag Team Championship (1 time) – with Doug Stahl

== See also ==
- The Super Destroyers
