= Chris Duffy (wrestler) =

American professional wrestler (1965–2000)

Personal information
- Born: Christopher Thomas Duffy; July 7, 1965 Braintree, Massachusetts, United States
- Died: August 25, 2000 (aged 35) Braintree, Massachusetts, United States
- Cause of death: Brain aneurysm

Professional wrestling career
- Ring name(s): The Bouncer; Chris Duffy
- Billed height: 6 ft 1 in (185 cm)
- Billed weight: 230 lb (104 kg)
- Billed from: Hollywood, California, United States
- Trained by: Killer Kowalski
- Debut: 1985

Christopher Thomas Duffy (July 7, 1965 – August 25, 2000) was an American professional wrestler who appeared primarily under the name Chris Duffy. He was a mainstay on the New England independent circuit during the late 1980s and 1990s, most notably competing for the International Wrestling Federation (IWF). Duffy was also notable for his sporadic appearances with the World Wrestling Federation (WWF) between 1986 and 1997.

== Professional wrestling career ==
Duffy was trained by wrestling legend Killer Kowalski and made his debut in the mid-1980s. On August 17, 1985, in World Class Championship Wrestling, he was defeated by Iceman Parsons. He later became a star in Kowalski's Massachusetts-based International Wrestling Federation promotion and won the IWF Heavyweight Championship in 1986 and 1987. In October 1991, he was one of several American wrestlers to tour Austria, Germany, Spain and Switzerland with Bob Yorey's World Wrestling Superstars. While in Europe, Duffy formed The Suicide Blonds with Johnny Rotten. He was called pro wrestling's "diamond in the rough" by Wrestling Eye the following year.

Duffy was one of several Kowalski students to regularly appear in the World Wrestling Federation. He began wrestling with the WWF in 1986, appearing frequently as a jobber. His first match saw him teaming with Lanny Poffo, where they were defeated by the Funk brothers Dory Jr and Terry. He would lose to Bret Hart, Jim Duggan, Jake Roberts and Tito Santana. His most notable appearance was a loss to Mike Shaw when he was Friar Ferguson on the 12th episode of Monday Night Raw on April 12, 1993. This was the only time the Friar Ferguson gimmick was used and afterward Shaw became Bastion Booger. His only victory was over Scott Taylor who later became Scotty 2 Hotty, on a house show. He also wrestled as The Goon, a character that was later played by Bill Irwin. His last match was a loss to a young Mark Henry on Shotgun Saturday Night on December 8, 1997, a dark match. Duffy played the Santa Claus who got stunned by Stone Cold Steve Austin on RAW.

On May 25, 1992 in Extreme Championship Wrestling, Duffy worked as "The Bouncer" where he lost to Japanese legend Tatsumi Fujinami. Duffy continued wrestling on the New England independent circuit after leaving the WWF. In 1994 during his time in IWF, he was defeated by Ronnie D, and defeated him around a month later. He also lost to Tony Roy and was defeated by The Bulldozer in a two on one handicap match, where he teamed with Tim McNeany.

== Death ==
Duffy died in his sleep on August 25, 2000. Multiple web sources had previously noted a seizure or heart attack as the culprit, but it was later made clear that it was a brain aneurysm. After his death, donations of Chris's organs and tissues gave sight to two women and his tissue donation helped 45 others. TBI and the New England Organ Bank hosted an event at December 5, 2013, at Braintree Town Hall to decorate Duffy's portrait. Sandy Duffy, his mother, put the finishing touches on his arrangement.

== Championships and accomplishments ==
- International Wrestling Federation
  - IWF Heavyweight Championship (2 times)
- Pro Wrestling Illustrated
  - PWI ranked him # 474 of the 500 best singles wrestlers in the PWI 500 in 1994
