= International Wrestling Federation =

American professional wrestling promotion

- Acronym: IWF
- Founded: 1979
- Defunct: 1996
- Headquarters: Reading, Massachusetts; Burlington, Vermont
- Founder: Killer Kowalski
- Owner: Killer Kowalski (1979–1996)

The International Wrestling Federation (IWF, also known as Killer Kowalski's All-Stars) was a professional wrestling promotion that held events in the New England area of the United States from 1979 to 1996, when it was run by Killer Kowalski. The promotion was based in Reading, Massachusetts, with offices in Burlington, Vermont. It operated in conjunction with Kowalski's wrestling school in Malden, Massachusetts.

== History and overview ==
=== Formation ===
The International Wrestling Federation was formed in 1979 by Killer Kowalski two years after starting his wrestling school, the Killer Kowalski Institute for Professional Wrestling, in Malden, Massachusetts. According to former student John Callahan, Kowalski decided to form his own group after an argument with Angelo Savoldi at the Boston Garden. The first championship titles were introduced in the early 1980s with Kowalski and The Executioners being billed as the first IWF Heavyweight and Tag Team Champions respectively. That same year, the IWF began airing a Sunday morning show, Bedlam from Boston, on the WXNE-TV. During this period, Kowalski partnered with Dominic DeNucci and Bruno Sammartino's "International Wrestling" group based in Pittsburgh, Pennsylvania.

=== Territorial reach ===
Kowalski initially promoted shows in the Greater Boston Area but eventually toured throughout the Northeastern United States. IWF event tours also included high school gyms and fairs in cities throughout New England. Some of the promotion's regular towns included Andover, Bellingham, Billerica, Grafton, Middleboro, Norwood, Waltham, and Westford, Massachusetts. Kowalsi was able to promote IWF shows via his weekly column, "Killer's Corner", for the Boston Sunday Herald. The IWF relocated to Burlington, Vermont in the early-1990s but returned to the Boston area by November 2001.

=== Notable talent ===
The IWF featured many former World Wide Wrestling Federation stars during its early years including, most notably, Dominic DeNucci, Larry Zbyszko, The Haiti Kid and The Valiant Brothers (Jerry Valiant and Johnny Valiant). Bull Curry was the main "heel" wrestling manager before his death. Zbyszko's infamous WWWF feud with Bruno Sammartino spilled over into the IWF as he battled his former mentor's real-life son Bruno Sammartino Jr. in late 1982. Kowalski continued bringing in talent from the World Wrestling Federation when Vince McMahon Jr. took over his father's promotion in the 1980s.

The promotion showcased a number of wrestlers who were regulars in the northeast wrestling scene and was the birthplace of Paul Levesque (then known as Terra Ryzing), Perry Saturn and Chyna. Levesque, who had graduated from Kowalski's school at the top of his class, made his IWF debut in March 1992 defeating Tony Roy. Two months later, he won the organization's heavyweight title from Mad Dog Richard. Saturn, billed as "The Iron Horseman", won the IWF North American and Light Heavyweight Championship during the early 1990s. He also won the IWF Tag Team Championship with Levesque. Saturn met his future tag team partner John Kronus while working for the IWF and helped enroll him in Kowalski's wrestling school. Brittany Brown was the longest reigning Women's Champion (12 years), then Chyna (Joanie Lee) won the IWF Ladies Championship from Violet Flame in the very late 1990s. "Giant" Ron Reis and The Renegade, as "Rio, Lord of the Jungle", found success in World Championship Wrestling.

=== World Wrestling Federation ===
Kowalski had a strong relationship with both Vince McMahon Sr. and his son Vince McMahon Jr. His students (many of whom IWF stars) regularly appeared on World Wrestling Federation television as preliminary wrestlers during the 1980s and 90s. His best known students - Triple H, Chyna and Perry Saturn - had prominent roles in the company during the Attitude Era.

The IWF later featured former WWF stars Demolition Ax, King Kong Bundy, Hercules, The Honky Tonk Man, The Mountie, Jake "The Snake" Roberts, Jimmy Snuka, and Nikolai Volkoff. In December 1992, following his controversial departure from the WWF, The Ultimate Warrior (appearing under his old "Dingo Warrior" ring name) wrestled Hercules at an IWF show in Billerica, Massachusetts. Then current WWF stars, such as Adam Bomb, Bob Backlund, Doink the Clown, King Kong Bundy and Hakushi, occasionally appeared at IWF events in the mid-1990s.

=== Demise ===
The IWF stopped holding regular shows after 1996 though Kowalski continued promoting under the "Killer Kowalski's All-Stars" banner for a few more years. In November 2001, the IWF took part in "Headlocks for Humanity", an American Red Cross benefit show for victims of the September 11th attacks, with Slyk Wagner Brown (managed by April Hunter) and CueBall representing the promotion. One of the IWF's last shows was held in Sutton, New Hampshire on November 2, 2002. Finally in 2003, health issues forced Kowalski to withdraw from both promoting and the wrestling school. Following his death in 2008, the Kowalski estate auctioned off IWF correspondence and other wrestling memorabilia from his career.

== Alumni ==
Male wrestlers

Birth name:	Ring name(s):	Tenure:	Notes
Michael Davis	Mike Davis	1994	
Theodore Arcidi	Ted Arcidi	1988	
Victor Arko	Mike Kelly	1982	
William Arko	Pat Kelly	1982	
Robert Backlund	Bob Backlund	1995–1996^{WWF}	
Jimmie Banks^{†}	Jojo Andrews	1982	
Edward Bazzaza	Ed Bonzo	1982	
Richard Beauchamp^{†}	Mad Dog Richard	1990–1995	
Matt Bloom	The Mongolian	1998	
Steve Bolus^{†}	Steve Bolus	1982	
Wagner Brown	Slyk Wagner Brown	2002	
Nick Busick	Nick Busick	1982	
Richard Byrne^{†}	"Superstar" Richard Byrne / The Russian Mauler	1982; 1993; 1995	
David Cahill^{†}	D.C. Dillinger	2002	
George Caiazzo^{†}	The Eliminator / John Kronus	1994–1995	
John Callahan	John Callahan	1982	
Preston Carrington	Tony Ulysses	1990; 1993; 1995	
Bert Centeno	El Mascarado	1994	
John Charyszyn^{†}	Larry Winters	1982	
Michael Chrosniak^{†}	Irish Mike McGee	1982	
Bryan Clark	Adam Bomb	1995^{WWF}	
William Coleman^{†}	Bad Billy Coleman	1982	
Jeremy Cotter	The Outpatient	1994–1996	
Richard Creasia	Ricky Sexton	1982	
William DeCoff	Sean O'Reilly	1985	
Dominic DeNucci	Dominic DeNucci	1982	
Darren DiCenso	Snooky Fink / Rain Drop	1993–1996	
Ron DiMaria	Ronnie Dee / The Star Warrior	1990; 1994–1995	
Kenneth Doane Jr.	Kenn Phoenix		
Christopher Duffy^{†}	Chris Duffy	1988- 1996	
James Duggan Jr.	Jim Duggan	1994	
Kevin Smyth	Irish Kevin Shaughnessy	1979–1982	
Bill Eadie	Demolition Ax	1993	
Eric Maher	Eddie Edwards	2002	
William Eichenberger^{†}	Billy Berger	1982	
Robert Elowitch	Robbie Ellis	1988; 1995	
Solofa Fatu, Jr.	Fatu	1996^{WWF}	
Gerard Fazio	Jerry Johnson / Jerry Fazio	1982	
Raymond Fernandez^{†}	Hercules	1993	
Wayne Farris	The Honky Tonk Man	1993	
Rudolph Freed	Rudy Diamond	1982	
Richard Fuller	Rick Fuller	1995	
Scott Garland	Scott Taylor	1993; 1995	
Steven Grabowski	Steve Grabowski	1982	
James Hellwig^{†}	The Dingo Warrior	1993	
Derek Higbee	The Bulldozer / Bull Dozer	1993–1996	
John Hill^{†}	Jerry Valiant	1982	
Michael Hollow	"All-American" Mike Hollow / Mike Harlow	1994–1998	
Curtis Hughes	Mr. Hughes	1994	
Glenn Jacobs	Isaac Yankem, D.D.S.	1996^{WWF}	
Michael Jones	Rocky Jones	1982	
Michael Jones	Virgil	1995	
Ken Jugan	Zoltan the Great	1982	
Steven King	Steve King / Phoenix King / Steve Hart / Stephan Roy / Arctic Angel	1993–1999	
Walter Kowalski^{†}	Killer Kowalski	1982; 1993	
Paul Levesque	Terra Ryzing	1992–1994	
Ray Licameli	Doink the Clown	1995^{WWF}	
Steve Lombardi	The Brooklyn Brawler / Doink the Clown	1995–1996^{WWF}	
James McCarthy	James Cody / Jim Cote / Kid Delicious	1995-1999	
Timothy McNeany	Tim McNeany / Doink the Clown	1993–1996	
Joe Meagher	Tim O'Reilly	1985; 1990	
Robert Miller^{†}	Bushwhacker Butch	1995	
John Minton^{†}	Big John Studd	1990	
James Neidhart	Jim Neidhart	1992	
Robert Orton Jr.	Bob Orton, Jr.	1988; 1992	
Tom O'Sullivan	Tom O'Sullivan		
Dan Ouellete	Freight Train Dan / Freightrain	1995–2002	
Christoper Pallies^{†}	King Kong Bundy	1995^{WWF}	
Josip Peruzovic^{†}	Nikolai Volkoff	1994^{WWF}	
Darryl Peterson	Man Mountain Rock	1995^{WWF}	
Dan Pettiglio	Dan Petty	1982; 1985	
Lanny Poffo^{†}	Lanny Poffo	1994	
Timothy Reid	Tim Reid	1982	
James Reiher^{†}	Jimmy Snuka	1993	
Ron Reis	"Giant" Ron Reis	1994	
Jacques Rougeau Jr.	The Mountie	1993	
Raymond Roy	The Stormtrooper	1994–1995	
Tony Roy	Antoine Roy / Tony Roy	1990–1996	
David Sammartino	Bruno Sammartino Jr.	1982	
Perry Satullo	The Iron Horseman / Perry Saturn	1992–1995	
Scott L. Schwartz	Giant David	1982	
Jerry Seavey	The Candyman	1992–1993	
Michael Sharpe Jr.^{†}	Iron Mike Sharpe	1990	
Michael Shaw^{†}	Bastion Booger	1995	
Ronald Shaw	Ron Shaw	1982	
Kensuke Shinzaki	Hakushi	1995^{WWF}	
Robert Shoup	Rob Van Winkle / Mark Lombardi	1985; 1988 1992	
Merced Solis	Tito Santana	1994–1995	
John Sullivan	Johnny Valiant	1982	
Paul Swanger	Concrete Cowboy	1982	
Terry Szopinski	The Warlord	1994–1995	
Dan Vinal	Big Dan Vinal	1985-2002	
Kevin Wacholz	Nailz	1993	
Brian Walsh	Brian Walsh	1985; 1995–1996	
Phil Watson	Whipper Watson Jr.	1982	
Lawrence Whistler	Larry Zbyszko	1982	
Brian Wickens	Bushwhacker Luke	1995	
Richard Williams^{†}	Rio, Lord of the Jungle	1993	
Unknown	The Beast	1982	
Unknown	Bill Wilcox	1991	
Unknown	Brian Bugle		
Unknown	Buddy Donovan	1982	
Unknown^{†}	Chief War Cloud	1982	
Unknown	Chris Grant	1982	
Unknown	Cueball	2002	
Unknown	Davey O'Hannon	1982	
Unknown	Freight Train Fulton	1992	
Unknown	Greg Winston	1982	
Unknown	Gypsy Rodriguez	1982	
Unknown	Hans Schroeder	1982	
Unknown	Jack Buford	1982	
Unknown	Jamie Pain	2002	
Unknown	Jed Skreem	1994	
Unknown	Jeff Craney	1982	
Unknown	Jeff Roberts	2002	
Unknown	John Bonello	1982	
Unknown	John Sullivan	2002	
Unknown	Manuel Soto	1982	
Unknown	Mike Madison	1982	
Unknown	Dangerous Dave Star	1984-1989	
Unknown	Mike "Jethro" Chambers	1982	
Unknown	Nemesis	2002	
Unknown	Richie Rich		
Unknown	Ron Lee	1982	
Unknown	Rush	2002	
Unknown	The Smooth Operator / Tre, The Smooth Operating Gangsta	1993–1996; 2002	
Unknown	Ultimate Hater	2002	

Female wrestlers

Birth name:	Ring name(s):	Tenure:	Notes
Theresa Best	Violet Flame / Rita Book	1995	
Dawn Francis	Rosebud	1990; 1993	
April Hunter	April Hunter	2002	
Linda Joaquin	Linda Dallas	1988	
Malia Hosaka	Malia Hosaka	1995	
Joan Laurer^{†}	Joanie Lee	1996	
Amy Nicoletti	Ramblin' Rose	1990–1995	
Nicole Raczynski	Nikki Roxx	2002	
Diane Syms	Misty Blue Simmes	1985; 1988	
Debbie Szostecki	Debbie Combs	1982	
Alexandra Whitney	Amanda Storm; Blackwidow	2000–2001	
Unknown	Alexa Starr	1994	
Unknown	Brittany Brown	1990-2003	
Unknown	Crystal Blue	1994	
Unknown	Donna Day	1982	
Unknown	Jamie West	1992–1996	
Unknown	Tammy West	1994	

Midget wrestlers

Birth name:	Ring name(s):	Tenure:	Notes
Raymond Kessler	The Haiti Kid	1982	
Jeffrey Ludy	Irish Leprechaun	1988; 1996; 1999	
Dana Magazu^{†}	Dana Carpenter	1985; 1988	
Roger Tomlin^{†}	Little Boy Blue	1982	
Douglas Tunstall Jr.	Tiny the Terrible	1996	
Louis Waterhouse	Little Louie	1985; 1994–1998	
Unknown	Mighty Doom	1994	
Unknown	Little Leopard	1994	

Stables and tag teams

Tag team/Stable(s)	Members	Tenure(s)
The Arc Angels	Phoenix King and Damon D'Arcangelo	1998
The Bushwhackers	Bushwhacker Butch and Bushwhacker Luke	1995
The Eliminators	Perry Saturn and John Kronus	1994–1995
The Kelly Twins	Mike Kelly and Pat Kelly	1982
The Mutilators	Jamie Pain and Nemesis	2002
The Soul Brothers	Tony Ulysses and Chris Grant	
The Valiant Brothers	Jerry Valiant and Johnny Valiant	1982

Managers and valets

Birth name:	Ring name(s):	Tenure:	Notes
Barry Atwood	The Court Jester	1992	
Claude Giroux	Dink	1995	
Fred Koury Sr.^{†}	Bull Curry	1982	
Don Liable	The Bug	1994; 1996	
Kevin Smyth	Mr. Ego-Trip Ian Foxx	1990; 1993	
John Minton^{†}	Big John Studd	1994	
Unknown	John Rodeo	1993–1998	
Unknown	Professor Eugene Bickell	1995–1996	
Unknown	Vito Carlucci	1995	

Commentators and interviewers

Birth name:	Ring name(s):	Tenure:	Notes
Chris Claussen	Chris Claussen	1982	Bedlam from Boston announcer
Stephen Driscoll	Stephen Driscoll	1982	Ring announcer Bedlam from Boston on-air talent
Mel Simons	Mel Simons	1982–1999	Ring announcer Bedlam from Boston on-air talent

Referees

Birth name:	Ring name(s):	Tenure:	Notes
Matt Cail	Matt Cail		
Richard Lannon	Richard Lannon		
Gary McCarthy	Gary McCarthy		
Fred Sparta	Fred Sparta		Head referee

Other personnel

Birth name:	Ring name(s):	Tenure:	Notes
Walter Kowalski^{†}	Killer Kowalski	1979–1996	Promoter
Don Liable	Don Liable		Head of publicity Official photographer

Company name to Year
Company name:	Years:
International Wrestling Federation	1979–1996
Killer Kowalski's All Stars	2002
Notes
^{†} Indicates they are deceased.
^{‡} Indicates they died while they were employed with .
^{WWF} Indicates they were part of a talent exchange with the World Wrestling Federation.

== Championships ==
Key

Reign	The reign number for the specific set of wrestlers listed
Event	The event promoted by the respective promotion in which the titles were won
N/A	The specific information is not known
—	Used for vacated reigns so as not to count it as an official reign
(n)	Indicates that a title change took place "no later than" the date listed. (Note: Documentation of the specific date of a title change is not found but documentation of the champion holding the title on that date/in that period.)
	Indicates that there was a period where the lineage is undocumented due to the lack of written documentation

=== IWF Heavyweight Championship ===
No.	Champion	Reign	Date	Days held	Location	Event	Notes	Ref.
1	Killer Kowalski	1	1982 (n)	N/A	Unknown	Live event		
2	Bryan Walsh	1	N/A	N/A	Unknown	Live event		
3	Chris Duffy	1	1986	N/A	Unknown	Live event		
4	Chris Duffy	2	1987	N/A	Unknown	Live event		
5	Ronnie Dee	1	N/A	N/A	Unknown	Live event		
6	Mad Dog Richard	1	June, 1991 (n)	N/A	Unknown	Live event		
7	Terra Ryzing	1	March 27, 1993	N/A	Middleboro, Massachusetts	Live event		
—	Vacated	—	March 12, 1994	—	N/A	N/A	Championship vacated upon signing a contract with World Championship Wrestling	
8	Tony Roy	1	October, 1994 (n)	N/A	Unknown	Live event		
9	Big Dan Vinal	2	November 2002	N/A	Unknown	Live event		

=== IWF Tag Team Championship ===
No.	Champions	Reign	Date	Days held	Location	Event	Notes	Ref.
1	The Executioners (Executioner #1 and Executioner #2)	1	1981 (n)	N/A	Unknown	Live event		
2	David Byrne and Danny Pettiglio	1	March, 1981 (n)	N/A	Unknown	Live event		
3	The Executioners (Executioner #1 and Executioner #2)	2	1982 (n)	N/A	Unknown	Live event		
4	Richard Byrne and Dan Petty	2	1982 (n)	N/A	Unknown	Live event		
5	Executioner #1 and Johnny Valiant	1	1982 (n)	N/A	Unknown	Live event		

=== IWF North American Championship ===
No.	Champion	Reign	Date	Days held	Location	Event	Notes	Ref.
1	The Iron Horseman	1	March, 1994 (n)	N/A	Unknown	Live event		
2	Tony Roy	1	March, 1995 (n)	N/A	Unknown	Live event		

=== IWF Light Heavyweight Championship ===
No.	Champion	Reign	Date	Days held	Location	Event	Notes	Ref.
1	Bill Wilcox	1	December, 1991 (n)	N/A	Unknown	Live event		
2	The Iron Horseman	1	December 6, 1991	N/A	Andover, Massachusetts	Live event		
3	Tony Ulysses	1	January, 1993 (n)	N/A	Unknown	Live event		
4	The Iron Horseman	2	January 8, 1993	N/A	Billerica, Massachusetts	Live event		

=== IWF Northeast Heavyweight Championship ===
No.	Champion	Reign	Date	Days held	Location	Event	Notes	Ref.
1	Kevin Shaughnessy (Kevin Smyth)	1	June, 1984 (n)	Retired Title 1985	Holyoke, Massachusetts	Live event		

=== IWF Ladies Championship ===
No.	Champion	Reign	Date	Days held	Location	Event	Notes	Ref.
1	Nickie Ryan	1	N/A	N/A	Unknown	Live event		
2	Linda Dallas	1	February 28, 1985	30	Boston, Massachusetts	Live event		
3	Misty Blue Simmes	1	March 30, 1985	N/A	N/A	Live event		
4	Kat Leroux	1	1987	N/A	N/A	Live event		
5	Misty Blue Simmes	2	1987	N/A	N/A	Live event	Also holds the NWA United States Women's Championship	
6	Babyface Nellie	1	December 17, 1991	N/A	N/A	Live event		
7	Brittany Brown	1	January 17, 1992	N/A	Hanover, Massachusetts	Live event		
8	Violet Flame	1	January, 1996 (n)	N/A	Unknown	Live event		
9	Joanie Lee	1	September 28, 1996	N/A	Salem, New Hampshire	Live event		
10	Blakwidow	1	June, 2001 (n)	N/A	N/A	Live event		
