= Ronnie D. Lishus =

American professional wrestler

Personal information
- Born: Ronald DiMaria United States

Professional wrestling career
- Ring name(s): Ronnie D. Lishus; Ronnie D. Licious; Ronnie D'lishus; The Star Warrior; Ronnie Dee; Ronny Dee; Ron Dee; Ron DiMaria
- Billed height: 6 ft 1 in (1.85 m)
- Billed weight: 220 lb (100 kg)
- Billed from: "Straight from the After Hours Parties of New York City"; The Far Corners of the Universe; Tampa, Florida
- Debut: 1985
- Retired: 2002

Ronald "Ron" DiMaria, also known by the ring name Ronnie D. Lishus, is an American retired professional wrestler. DiMaria began his career in Killer Kowalski's International Wrestling Federation, where he held the IWF Heavyweight Championship, and was an occasional preliminary wrestler for the World Wrestling Federation. DiMaria also competed in International World Class Championship Wrestling where he was known as The Star Warrior. He was one of the most popular stars in the promotion despite never holding a championship title.

During the early-2000s, DiMaria reinvented himself as an arrogant "heel" performer named Ronnie D. Lishus. DiMaria was part of The One Night Stand with partners Edward G. Xtasy and Aaron Stevens in Chaotic Wrestling. During his time with the company, he held both the Chaotic Wrestling Heavyweight Championship and Chaotic Wrestling Tag Team Championship twice with Edward G. Xtasy. He also worked for the Century Wrestling Alliance, New England Championship Wrestling and other Northeastern independent promotions.

== Professional wrestling career ==
=== World Wrestling Federation ===
In early 1985, DiMaria began working for the World Wrestling Federation as a preliminary wrestler under the name Ronnie Dee. On March 26, DiMaria was defeated by Brutus "The Barber" Beefcake at the Mid-Hudson Civic Center. He returned to Poughkeepsie the following month teaming with Tony Garea and Jose Luis Rivera against George "The Animal" Steele, The Iron Sheik and Nikolai Volkoff in a 6-man team match. DiMaria's team lost when he submitted to Steele's flying hammerlock. He made his television debut on the April 20th episode of WWF All American Wrestling against King Kong Bundy at the Civic Centre in Brantford, Ontario. On the May 23rd episode of WWF Tuesday Night Titans, DiMaria took on Ken Patera. DiMaria submitted to a swinging full nelson after a two-minute bout, however, he was attacked by Patera after the match who reapplied the hold until being stopped by referees. He also faced Brutus "The Barber" Beefcake, Don Muraco, and "Macho Man" Randy Savage at the Brantford Civic Centre that year.

Near the end of his first WWF run, DiMaria scored a surprise victory over Terry Funk on the October 26th edition of WWF Championship Wrestling. Initially pinned by Funk following an elbow drop, DiMaria was awarded the match via reverse decision after Funk used a branding iron and continued assaulting him after the match was over. DiMaria's last WWF TV appearance was on the May 5th 1986 episode of WWF Prime Time Wrestling in a tag team match with Mario Mancini against The Hart Foundation (Bret Hart and Jim Neidhart). DiMaria's team lost when he was pinned by Hart following The Hart Foundation's "Hart Attack" finisher.

=== International Wrestling Federation ===
DiMaria wrestled for Killer Kowalski's International Wrestling Federation where he feuded with Mad Dog Richard. On April 20, 1990, DiMaria and Tony Ulysses defeated Mad Dog Richards and Big Al Mac in Brockton, Massachusetts. That same night, DiMaria took part in a 10-man battle royal which was won by his tag team partner. He also held the IWF Heavyweight Championship at one point. The following year, he toured Europe with Road Warrior Animal, Misty Blue, Tom Brandi and other American wrestlers. On March 22, 1991, DiMaria wrestled fellow IWF star Chris Duffy in Vienna. Seven months later, DiMaria teamed with The Cheetah Kid to wrestle Duffy and Johnny Rotten in front of around 1,100 fans in Oslo.

=== International World Class Championship Wrestling ===
In the summer of 1991, DiMaria enjoyed a brief but memorable run for the Savoldi family in International World Class Championship Wrestling. He wrestled as The Star Warrior, a mysterious facepaint-clad wrestler somewhat similar to The Ultimate Warrior, who was billed from "The Far Corners of the Universe". DiMaria made his IWCCW television debut against Georgia Gorilla #1 on August 3, 1991, pinning his opponent with a reverse elbow off the top rope. He quickly became one of the promotion's most popular "fan favorites" after rescuing "Jumpin'" Joe Savoldi from The Billion Dollar Babies (Mike Samson and G.Q. Stratus) and manager Kevin "The Truth" Casey.

=== Independent circuit ===
DiMaria spent most of the decade wrestling in the New England area both as The Star Warrior and Ronnie Dee. In addition to IWCCW and the IWF, DiMaria also worked for Richard Byrne's United States Wrestling Federation and smaller independent groups. He also made sporadic appearances as a preliminary wrestler on WWF Monday Night Raw between 1993 and 1994. DiMaria eventually retired The Star Warrior character in the mid-1990s.

=== Century Wrestling Alliance ===
In 1996, DiMaria began wrestling for the Century Wrestling Alliance. On March 2, DiMaria defeated Hugh Morrus by disqualification in Waltham, Massachusetts. He eventually became involved in a feud with The Brotherhood led by Tony Rumble. On March 28, 1997, DiMaria was defeated by Knuckles Nelson in Bristol, Rhode Island. He avenged this loss at an Eastern Wrestling Alliance show at Edward Little High School two months later. DiMaria, accompanied by El Mascarado and Baby Black Kangaroo, won the bout by disqualification when the rest of Nelson's stablemates attempted to interfere. On June 27, DiMaria joined Demolition Ax, Vic Steamboat and The Power Company (Dave and Dean Power) in a 10-man tag team match against The Brotherhood (Tony Rumble, Knuckles Nelson, Tre, Rick Fuller and Baldo) at Harry Dellarusso Stadium in Revere, Massachusetts. The match ended in a double disqualification. On October 4, 1997, DiMaria lost to Knuckles Nelson at the Sports Palace in New Britain, Connecticut. He also teamed with Vic Steamboat to defeat Devon Storm and Ace Darling at the same event.

=== Chaotic Wrestling ===
==== One Night Stand ====
By the end of the 1990s, DiMaria had become a "rulebreaker" wrestling under the name Ronnie D. Lishus. As part of his new in-ring persona, DiMaria formed The One Night Stand with Edward G. Xtasy and were among the first wrestlers signed to contracts with Chaotic Wrestling. A 15-year veteran at that point, DiMaria was considered one of the most experienced wrestlers on the roster. They made their debut in 2000 and quickly worked their way up the tag team division. The One Night Stand spent their first year in the promotion feuding with The Millennium Killaz (Gino Martino and Ali Mohammed). On September 17, 2000, The One Night Stand battled The Millennium Killaz in front an estimated 1,000-1,500 fans at WAAF's annual Locobazooka festival at Worcester's Green Hill Park. The year-long rivalry was voted Feud of the Year by Chaotic Wrestling fans in 2000.

==== Tag Team Champion ====
On October 20, 2000, One Night Stand defeated The Damned (Mad Dog and Draven) at the Worcester Palladium for the Chaotic Wrestling Tag Team Championship. The team lost the title to Spike Dudley and Kyle Storm at Revere's Wonderland Greyhound Park four months later. On February 9, 2001, Master Sandy became the manager for The One Night Stand. In the spring of 2001, DiMaria took on both Ali Muhammed and Gino Martino in singles matches. On March 17, DiMaria lost to Muhammed via disqualification when he was caught passing a foreign object back to his partner at ringside. On April 6, DiMaria unsuccessfully challenged Martino for the Chaotic Wrestling Heavyweight Championship in a no-disqualification match. Ricky "The Dragon" Steamboat was the special guest referee.

The tag team title was vacated on April 14, 2001, after Dudley signed with World Wrestling Entertainment and Storm suffered a shoulder injury, allowing DiMaria and Xtasy to regain the belts after defeating Touch of Reality (Jim the Messenger and Bob Steele) in Andover, Massachusetts the following week. That summer, the team defended the championship against midget wrestler Short Sleeve Sampson with partners Gino Martino and Vince Vicallo. The One Night Stand and Sampson were later included as part of a Boston article on Chaotic Wrestling. Their second championship reign lasted another four months until the team's loss to Little Guido Maritato and "Latin Fury" Luis Ortiz in Lynn, Massachusetts on August 10, 2001. One Night Stand, specifically Edward G. Xtasy and Aaron Stevens, won the tag titles back at Bryant College that fall.

==== Heavyweight Champion ====
On September 7, DiMaria defeated Gino Martino in Lawrence, Massachusetts to win the Chaotic Wrestling Heavyweight Championship. Marino suffered a serious neck injury during this bout and was out of action for three months. On the October 26 edition of Friday Night Chaos, DiMaria defended the Chaotic Wrestling title in a "champion vs. champion" match against AWF Heavyweight Champion Tito Santana at North Smithfield High School. The bout ended when The One Night Stand entered the ring to attack Santana as was putting DiMaria in a figure-four leglock. The group continued attacking Santana until they were chased off by Tony Atlas. Santana was declared the winner via disqualification allowing DiMaria to retain the Chaotic Wrestling Heavyweight Championship. Two months later, DiMaria was one of several Chaotic Wrestling stars involved with Toys for Tots.

The One Night Stand made their final appearance at Cold Fury 1 on December 14, 2001. The group refused to defend the tag titles as Edward G. Xtasy's contract had expired five days prior to the event. Xtasy delivered a "worked shoot" in which he criticized Mike Hollow, then head instructor at Chaotic Wrestling's training facility, and announced he was taking his half of the tag team title with him. After a confrontation with announcer Rich Palladino, their opponents R. J. Brewer and Vince Vicallo stormed the ring. DiMaria was at ringside during the match and frequently interfered on the team's behalf. This later backfired when DiMaria accidentally knocked out Xtasy with his heavyweight belt and allowed Vicallo to pin Xtasy to win the tag titles. Xtasy was subsequently forced to leave the building by Chaotic Wrestling president Randy Miller and other officials. In the main event, DiMaria lost the heavyweight championship to Luis Ortiz in a Lumberjack match. DiMaria was fired by Chaotic Wrestling that same night.

=== Later career and retirement ===
DiMaria and Xtasy briefly resurfaced in New England Championship Wrestling before DiMaria's sudden retirement. On May 21, 2002, they defeated Brian Jury and Kevin Grace at the Good Time Emporium in Somerville, Massachusetts. That summer, The One Night Stand entered a tournament to declare new NECW Tag Team Champions. They were eliminated by Slyk Wagner Brown and April Hunter in the first semi-final match at NECW's second annual Birthday Bash supercard. After the match, both men "gave a profanity-laden promo" before the house mics were cut and the wrestlers thrown out of the building.

== Championships and accomplishments ==
- Chaotic Wrestling
  - Chaotic Wrestling Heavyweight Championship (1 time)
  - Chaotic Wrestling Tag Team Championship (2 times) – with Edward G. Xtasy
  - Feud of the Year (2000) with Edward G. Xtasy vs. The Millennium Killaz (Gino Martino and Ali Mohammed)
- International Wrestling Federation
  - IWF Heavyweight Championship (1 time)
- Pro Wrestling Illustrated
  - Ranked #449 of the top 500 singles wrestlers in the PWI 500 in 1991
