= John Callahan (wrestler) =

American professional wrestler

Personal information
- Born: August 21, 1960 (age 65) Milford, Massachusetts, U.S.

Professional wrestling career
- Ring name(s): John Callahan; Sgt. Muldoon
- Trained by: Killer Kowalski
- Debut: 1979
- Retired: 1999

John Callahan (born August 21, 1960) was a former professional wrestler in the World Wrestling Federation (WWF) from 1979 to 1984. He held the New England Heavyweight title twice, from June 1994 to November 1995, and the New England Tag Team title (along with fellow wrestler Big City Mike) from November 1993 to July 1995.

== Early life ==
John Callahan was born in Milford, Massachusetts and at the age of 10 was taken with the exploits of such colorful and established professional wrestlers as George "The Animal" Steele and Manuel Soto. His friends joined him in the construction of a makeshift wrestling ring, or "squared circle", and imitated the mannerisms and techniques of their heroes, holding their own matches.

In 1979 he left home to study the sport under the guidance of Edward Władysław Spulnik, better known as "Killer Kowalski", in Salem, Massachusetts. He was also trained by Hurricane Bob Wheeler in Waltham, Massachusetts.

== Killer Kowalski (1979) ==
At his wrestling school at the YMCA in Salem, Killer Kowalski found Callahan ready to turn professional within a few months .

== World Wrestling Federation ==
In 1979, Callahan began his professional wrestling career with the World Wrestling Federation. His first major match took place in April 1981 against Hulk Hogan. The match took place in the Boston Garden in front of many of Callahan's friends and family members. Callahan was defeated and later recalled, "All I saw was the heads (of the crowd) silhouetted by the lights".

In addition to Hulk Hogan, Callahan wrestled the Junkyard Dog, Tony Atlas and Rowdy Roddy Piper. A personal favorite was his Allentown, Pennsylvania, battle against the Iron Shiek, which resulted in another Callahan defeat, this time within three minutes.

It was at this point that while some wrestlers took the path of the "good guy," Callahan opted for a "villain" persona. Over the years he created and performed as characters such as the "Baltimore Terror", the "American Ninja", and finally "Big John Callahan". Another character he created during a wrestling stint in Quebec, Canada, was "Sgt. Muldoon". This persona was dropped when a promoter asked why he had inexplicably decided to play an Irish wrestler from a world populated entirely by French Canadians, "rather than Southie".

== Injuries and the end of career ==
Throughout his career Callahan battled dislocated joints and broken bones. On at least one occasion, he claims to have fought through a 10-minute match despite a dislocated knee. On another, he continued wrestling even after his nose had been shattered, the match finally coming to an end when he could no longer breathe. "People come in (to the matches) looking to believe everything they see, so you might as well make it believable," Callahan later said.

In 1999, Callahan dislocated his hip and a doctor determined he needed a hip replacement. "I decided if I wasn't going to be able to put on a show anymore and really entertain, it wasn't worth doing," he later told an interviewer.

Callahan was for a time a circulation manager for Milford Daily News, and now works as Sgt. Muldoon for the Woonsocket, Rhode Island–based Showcase Pro Wrestling as the ring announcer and conducting interview segments during the shows.

== Induction to the New England Professional Wrestling Hall of Fame (2011) ==
In May 2011, Callahan was recognized with his induction to the New England Wrestling Hall of Fame.

== Showcase Pro Wrestling ==
As of 2013, Callahan was still active in Woonsocket, Rhode Island's Showcase Pro Wrestling, as a manager of the tag team the Convicts.
