= NWA Southern Heavyweight Championship (Tennessee version) =

The NWA Tennessee Southern Heavyweight Championship was a short-lived title in the National Wrestling Alliance that was defended in Southern Championship Wrestling. It existed from 1981 to 1982.

== Title history ==
Wrestler:	Times:	Date:	Location:	Notes:
Mongolian Stomper	1	June 5, 1981	Knoxville, TN	Defeated Blackjack Mulligan, Jr. to become the first recognized champion.
Blackjack Mulligan, Jr.	1	July 1981		
Big John Studd	1	July 24, 1981	Knoxville, TN	
Blackjack Mulligan, Jr.	2	October 2, 1981	Knoxville, TN	
Kevin Sullivan	1	December 1981		Title is abandoned in 1982.

== See also ==
- List of National Wrestling Alliance championships
- NWA Southern Heavyweight Championship (Florida version)
- NWA Southern Heavyweight Championship (Georgia version)
