= Kevin Sullivan (wrestler) =

American professional wrestler and booker (1949–2024)

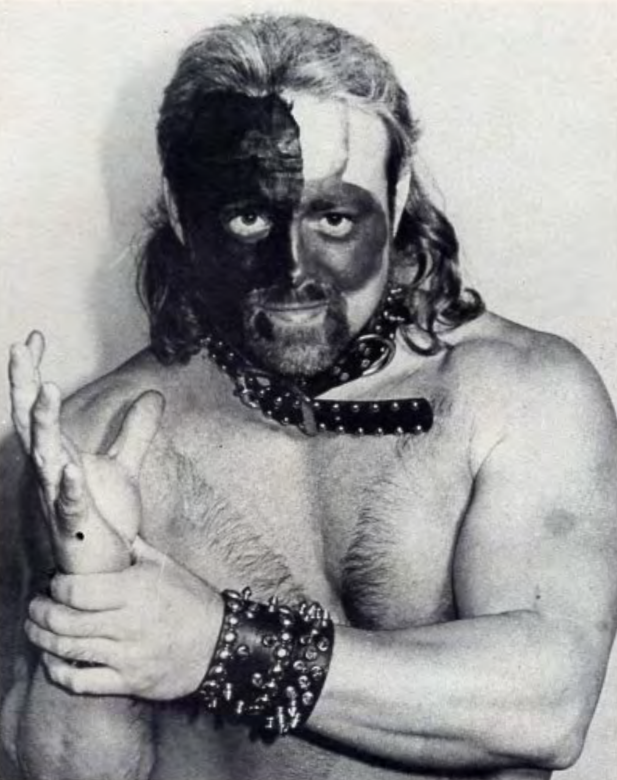
- Sullivan, circa 1984

Personal information
- Born: Kevin Francis Sullivan; October 26, 1949 Cambridge, Massachusetts, U.S.
- Died: August 9, 2024 (aged 74) Concord, Massachusetts, U.S.
- Spouses: Nancy Toffoloni (m. 1985; div. 1997): Linda Sullivan
- Children: 4

Professional wrestling career
- Ring name(s): The Boston Battler; The Gamesmaster; Johnny West; Kevin Caldwell; Kevin Sullivan; Masked Lucifer; The Great Wizard; The Taskmaster; The Prince of Darkness
- Billed height: 5 ft 9 in (1.75 m)
- Billed weight: 250 lb (110 kg; 18 st)
- Billed from: Boston, Massachusetts; Lexington, Massachusetts; Singapore; Eleuthera, The Bahamas "The Iron Gates of Fate" (as "The Taskmaster" Kevin Sullivan as the leader of the Dungeon of Doom); The Conch Republic
- Debut: October 1970
- Retired: July 20, 2019

Kevin Francis Sullivan (October 26, 1949 – August 9, 2024) was an American professional wrestler and booker, best known for his roles in Championship Wrestling From Florida and World Championship Wrestling.

== Early life ==
Sullivan was born on October 26, 1949 in Cambridge, Massachusetts, the son of a police officer. He grew up in a working class Irish American neighborhood. As a youth, Sullivan participated in amateur wrestling at the YMCA and at boys' clubs, as well as weightlifting. He was a fan of the local Big Time Wrestling professional wrestling promotion.

== Professional wrestling career ==
=== Early career (1970–1982) ===
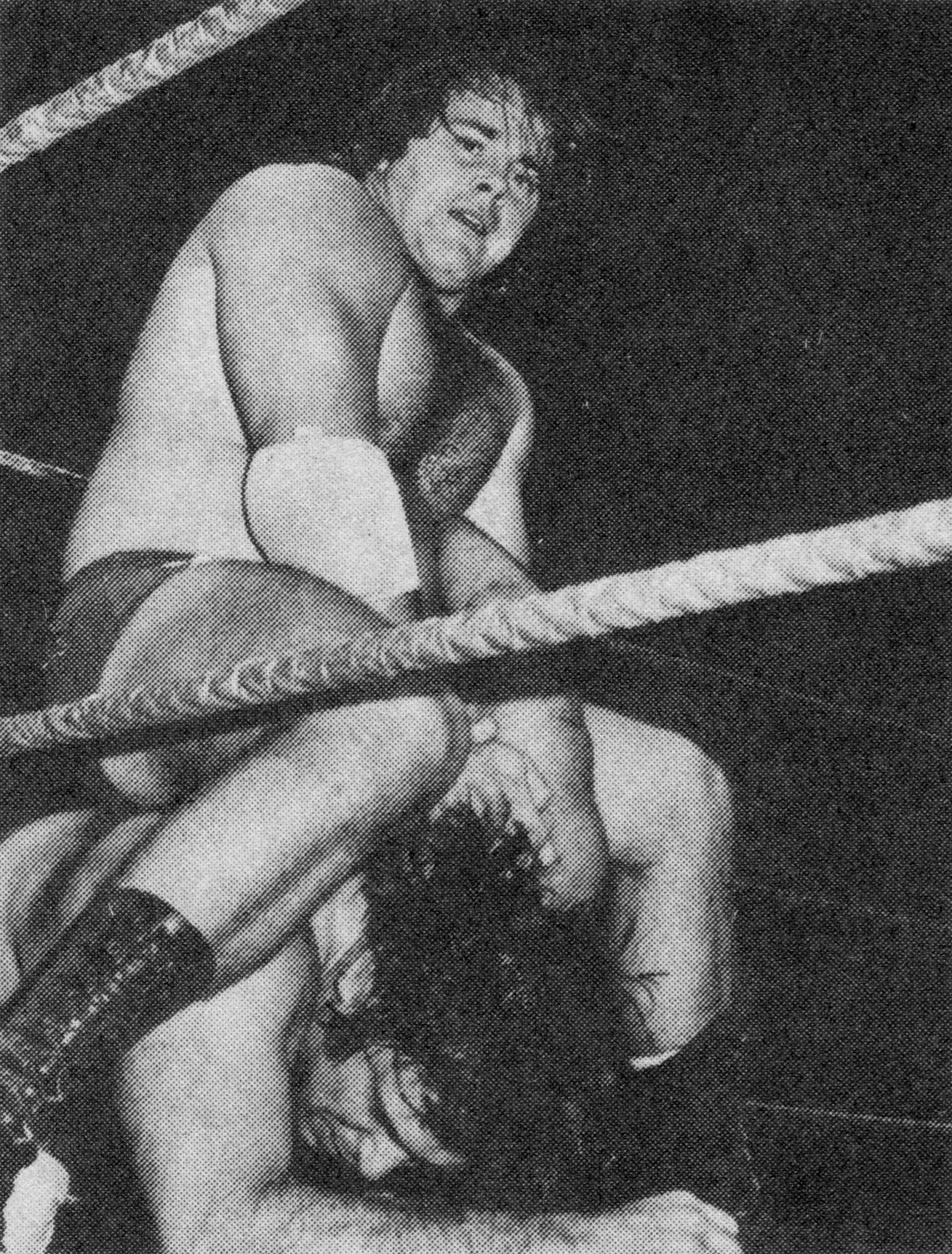
Sullivan wrestling Pete Sanchez at Madison Square Garden on November 17, 1975

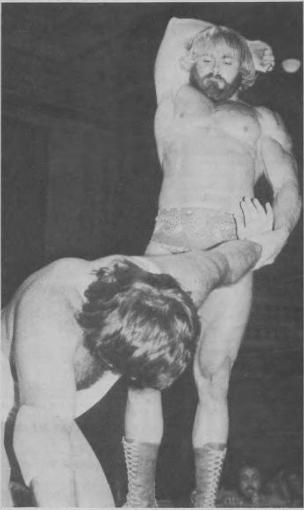
Sullivan during a match with Jerry Lawler in 1981

Sullivan had been an amateur wrestler in the Boston area, and was not trained professionally. His first professional match was in Montreal, beating Fernand Frechette. Sullivan wrestled as "Johnny West" in the National Wrestling Alliance's Gulf Coast Championship Wrestling in the early 1970s, capturing the NWA Gulf Coast Tag Team Championship with Ken Lucas, defeating Jack Morrell and Eddie Sullivan on March 11, 1971. Next, he went to Championship Wrestling from Florida (CWF) in 1972 and captured the NWA Florida Tag Team Championship with Mike Graham. He then went north to join the World Wide Wrestling Federation (WWWF) as a mid-card face from 1974 to 1977. He had a (rare for the time) face versus face battle with Pete Sanchez on a Madison Square Garden undercard. Sullivan also wrestled as a face for promoter Roy Shire's Big Time Wrestling in San Francisco. Wrestling for Georgia Championship Wrestling, Sullivan and partner Austin Idol challenged The Fabulous Freebirds for the NWA Georgia Tag Team Championship in November 1980. During this feud was the angle where the Freebirds flattened all four of Idol's tires to prevent him and Sullivan from wrestling for the titles (though Idol only mentioned a single flat tire). Sullivan also worked in CWF as a face until the early 1980s.

His first heel turn was in Georgia in late 1980, when he won the NWA National Television Championship from Steve Keirn on November 29, after Sullivan attacked Keirn during the match while Keirn was re-entering the ring. Sullivan would lose the belt to Steve O on January 16, 1981, due to outside interference by Keirn. From April to July 1981, Sullivan wrestled as a heel in the Memphis territory, where alongside Wayne Ferris (The Honky Tonk Man) and manager Jimmy Hart, he battled the local faces including Jerry Lawler, while also continuing his feud with Keirn, who also was wrestling in Memphis at the time. Sullivan returned to Georgia as a heel in November 1981, but turned face by late-March 1982, feuding with Buzz Sawyer while in the Georgia territory before returning to Florida again to wrestle for Eddie Graham.

=== Championship Wrestling from Florida (1982–1987) ===
Known as the heel "Boston Battler", Sullivan's "Prince of Darkness" gimmick started during this time, adopting the persona of an occultist and cult leader who would invoke the powers of dark spirits in promos and matches. The gimmick was inspired by the then-ongoing Satanic panic and by the Manson Family, with Sullivan sometimes wearing a Charles Manson-esque 'X' drawn on his forehead.

In CWF he became associated with "Maniac" Mark Lewin (Purple Haze), Mike Davis, Bob Roop, The Lock and Luna Vachon and others as the Army of Darkness. His biggest rivals during this time included Dusty Rhodes, Barry Windham, and his former partner Mike Graham. Sullivan split his time with International Championship Wrestling and brought "The Prince of Darkness" gimmick there, along with Lewin and Roop. He had the Fallen Angel as his valet, who later became known as Woman. Sullivan was the top heel in ICW when the company first went national and had noted feuds with Austin Idol, Superstar Billy Graham, Bruiser Brody, Joseph Savoldi and Blackjack Mulligan.

=== Jim Crockett Promotions / World Championship Wrestling (1987–1991) ===
Sullivan (front) as a member of the Varsity Club, c. 1988

Sullivan formed the Varsity Club upon arrival in Jim Crockett Promotions with Mike Rotunda and Rick Steiner. They immediately started feuding with Jimmy Garvin because Sullivan wanted Garvin's wife Precious for himself. This feud lasted a while with Sullivan kayfabe breaking Garvin's leg at one point. Steiner left the group and was replaced by "Dr. Death" Steve Williams and Dan Spivey. They feuded with Dusty Rhodes, the Road Warriors, Rick Steiner and Eddie Gilbert. Sullivan even attacked Gilbert's wife Missy Hyatt.

By late 1989, the Varsity Club was gone, and Sullivan formed the stable "Sullivan's Slaughterhouse" with Cactus Jack and Buzz Sawyer (later replaced by Bam Bam Bigelow) to feud with Rotunda. Sullivan took time off in late 1990 and returned in early 1991 as the manager of One Man Gang, Black Blood, and the Angel of Death. They cut El Gigante's hair and had a brief feud. Sullivan also was the masked Great Wizard briefly to manage Oz.

Sullivan left WCW in August 1991 upon his contract expiring.

=== Frontier Martial-Arts Wrestling / W*ING (1992) ===
In 1992, Sullivan worked in Japan, participating in Frontier Martial-Arts Wrestling where he wrestled against Atsushi Onita with Ed Farhat, and later moved on to compete in W*ING.

=== Smoky Mountain Wrestling (1992–1994) ===
Sullivan was in a feud with "Primetime" Brian Lee where after Lee's matches there would be a miniature tombstone brought to ringside. During this feud he was known as The Master and enlisted the help of The Nightstalker and the Mongolian Mauler to soften up Lee. After Lee defeated Nightstalker, he finally came face to face with The Master who was revealed to be Sullivan after he delivered a fireball to the face of Lee and was joined by Nightstalker in busting open Lee on live television. Lee would return and finally get the upper hand on Sullivan in a Singapore Spike match with Sullivan which Lee won after Nightstalker accidentally hit Sullivan with the spike. Sullivan left SMW shortly after losing a match to Ronnie Garvin by DQ in March 1994.

=== Eastern Championship Wrestling (1993–1994) ===
In September 1993, Sullivan – along with Woman – joined the Philadelphia, Pennsylvania-based promotion Eastern Championship Wrestling. He debuted at UltraClash, teaming with Abdullah The Butcher against Stan Hansen and Terry Funk in a bunkhouse match. At NWA Bloodfest the following month, Sullivan faced Abdullah in a steel cage match that ended in a double disqualification. At Terror at Tabor in November, Sullivan won a battle royal. The following day, at November to Remember, he defeated Tommy Cairo.

In December 1993, Sullivan formed a tag team with The Tazmaniac. In their first match together, the duo defeated Shane Douglas and Tommy Dreamer for the ECW Tag Team Championship. They successfully defended the titles against opponents such as Badd Company and The Young Dragons before a match against The Bruise Brothers in February 1994 ended in controversial fashion, resulting in the titles being vacated. Sullivan and The Tazmaniac defeated The Bruise Brothers in a rematch the following month to regain the titles, but lost them to The Public Enemy the next day. At The Night the Line Was Crossed that month, Sullivan and The Tazmaniac lost to Pat Tanaka and The Sheik. At Ultimate Jeopardy on March 26, 1994, Sullivan teamed with The Tazmaniac, Road Warrior Hawk, and ECW Heavyweight Champion Terry Funk to face Mr. Hughes, The Public Enemy, and Shane Douglas in an Ultimate Jeopardy match with the stipulation that Sullivan and The Tazmaniac would be forced to disband if they were defeated; the match ended when Douglas pinned Funk. Sullivan continued to team with The Tazmaniac until April 1994.

In May 1994, Sullivan unsuccessfully challenged Mikey Whipwreck for the ECW Television Championship. His final match for ECW was a loss to Jimmy Snuka on May 14, 1994 at When Worlds Collide; during the match, Woman left Sullivan to join forces with The Sandman. Sullivan subsequently left ECW to return to World Championship Wrestling full-time; Woman remained in ECW until February 1996. While working for WCW, Sullivan – along with Brian Pillman and Sherri Martel – made an appearance at an ECW event on November 18, 1994 as part of a settlement for a copyright infringement claim filed against WCW by ECW.

=== Return to WCW (1994–2001) ===
==== Tag team division; Three Faces of Fear (1994–1995) ====
Sullivan made appearances with World Championship Wrestling in January and March 1994, teaming with his kayfabe brother Dave Sullivan (a dyslexic character who was being picked on by The Nasty Boys) at house shows and on WCW Pro and WCW Worldwide. In April 1994, Sullivan began appearing regularly with WCW.

Sullivan enlisted Cactus Jack's help and beat The Nasty Boys for the Tag Team Title. Dave was injured and out of action for a while and Sullivan split with Cactus after losing the titles. Sullivan defeated Cactus in a Loser Leaves WCW match at Fall Brawl.

Dave came back and dressed like his idol, Hulk Hogan. This infuriated Kevin, who hated Hogan, and they started feuding. Kevin brought in Hogan's best friend, Ed Leslie, as The Butcher, to help him with his feud against Hogan. He also brought in Avalanche and called the trio the Three Faces of Fear. They feuded with Hogan, Randy Savage and Sting. In early 1995, after not being able to end Hogan's career, Avalanche left the group and Sullivan turned on The Butcher.

==== Dungeon of Doom (1995–1997) ====
Later in 1995 Sullivan began hearing the voice of someone calling for him to come find him. Over the course of several weeks, vignettes were shot with Sullivan searching for the man, who eventually became known as The Master. Once Sullivan found The Master he was rechristened with a new gimmick, The Taskmaster. The two men immediately started putting together a new group that eventually became known as the Dungeon of Doom. In time, the group grew to include Kamala, The Barbarian, Meng, The Yeti, Hugh Morrus, Loch Ness, One Man Gang, Big Bubba Rogers, and The Giant. Sullivan also brought in his former 3 Faces of Fear stablemates, with Avalanche wrestling as The Shark and The Butcher wrestling as The Zodiac. For a very short time, Big Van Vader also was a member. Managed by Sullivan, four Dungeon of Doom members lost to The Hulkamaniacs in a WarGames match at September's Fall Brawl. As a result of Hogan's win over Zodiac, he got to spend five minutes alone with Sullivan. The feud with Hogan continued for much of the remainder of the year and saw the group add Jimmy Hart as its manager, after he turned on Hogan in October 1995 and cost him the WCW World Heavyweight Championship in a match with the Giant.

The Dungeon then feuded with the Four Horsemen, and Sullivan acquired a certain disliking for Brian Pillman. Once Sullivan sent Pillman packing, the Dungeon and the Horsemen joined forces again to get rid of Hulk Hogan and his friends and formed the unsuccessful Alliance To End Hulkamania.

==== Retirement and switch to booking duties (1997–2001) ====
Afterward, Sullivan and Horseman Chris Benoit began a feud much like his with Pillman. It lasted for over a year, during which Benoit took Woman from him. Sullivan brought in Jacquelyn to help him and added Konnan to the Dungeon. He lost a retirement match to Benoit at Bash at the Beach on July 13, 1997.

This loss gave him more time to concentrate on his job as booker. Sullivan stayed on as the booker or a member of the WCW booking committee after he put Benoit over and made a brief on-screen appearance with the reformed Varsity Club of Mike Rotunda and Rick Steiner with their cheerleader, Leia Meow. After a couple of months, he was back off television.

In 2000, after the demotion of Ed Ferrara and Vince Russo (and subsequent departure of the latter), the resulting chaos led to Sullivan's promotion to head booker. This move infuriated a number of WCW wrestlers, given Sullivan's history of professional rivalries with Benoit (Benoit had an affair with Nancy Benoit and later married her). Benoit, Dean Malenko, Eddie Guerrero and Perry Saturn would quit the night after, immediately signing with the World Wrestling Federation. Sullivan was fired before WCW's sale in 2001.

=== Independent promotions (2002–2024) ===
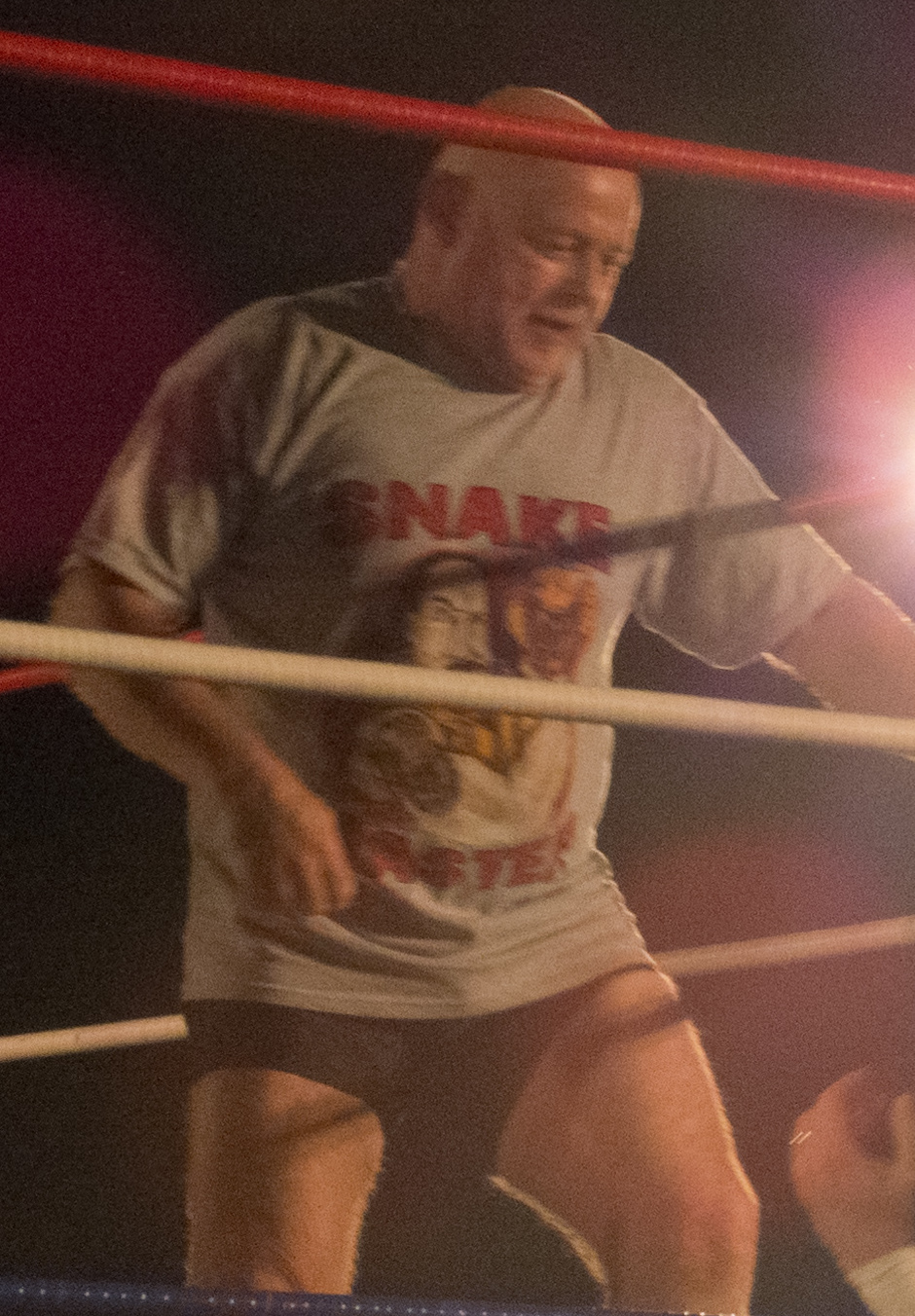
Sullivan in 2012

In 2003, Sullivan made one surprise appearance in Total Nonstop Action Wrestling, as the officiator in the first Clockwork Orange House of Fun match. In late 2003/2004, he worked for the All World Wrestling League/Big Time Wrestling. In 2010, Sullivan appeared as one of the main subjects in the feature-length documentary film Card Subject To Change. In 2012 he started wrestling in the Pacific Northwest with his nephew Dash Venture and one other Ron Sullivan (Von Hess). Together they won the AIWF World Six-Man Championship. Also The Taskmaster fought the Grappler during this time. First time ever in their long careers. On April 28, 2012, Sullivan made a surprise appearance, initially under a mask, during the Shane Douglas vs. 2 Cold Scorpio match at Extreme Reunion in Philadelphia, Pennsylvania. On March 8, 2013, Sullivan appeared in Nitro, West Virginia where he reunited with Dash Venture Sullivan in his corner as he faced Ron Mathis. On July 7, 2013, Sullivan appeared at Supercon in Miami as himself to sign autographs.

He appears as himself in the opening wrestling sequence of the 2013 film Pro Wrestlers vs Zombies during APWA Wrestling Pile Driving Drugs II. He wrestled in a tag match teaming with Barbarian and was managed by Don West. They would defeat Beastman and Jock Samson. In May 2014, Kevin Sullivan began working for promoter Don West with the American Pro Wrestling Alliance and is the current booker for the promotion. Kevin put Don over, passing him the torch, saying that he would be darker than he ever was. Kevin is mentoring him as the manager for The First Family in the APWA with The Barbarian, Ricky Reyes and the Turkana Warrior. On June 26, 2014, Sullivan teamed with Ace Perry and Christian Skyfire to defeat John Wayne Murdoch, Reed Bentley and Tripp Cassidy in the Main Event of an Evolution Pro Wrestling event He is podcast host for MLW Radio. He co-hosted a free show with Mister Saint Laurent called MSL & Sullivan until early 2018 and continues to host a premium show called Kevin Sullivan's Helluva Deal.

On July 13, 2019, Sullivan wrestled his last match against Brian Pillman Jr. in a No Holds Barred match which ended in a no contest at ECCW: Ballroom Brawl XII in Vancouver, British Columbia, Canada. Sullivan served as a color commentator for the television show for the Texas-based SWE promotion in 2020 until the promotion closed in 2021. From 2021 to 2024, Sullivan became the manager of The Blood Hunter in PCW Ultra and World Class Pro.

=== Ring of Honor (2016–2017) ===
On June 24, 2016, Sullivan made a surprise appearance during an Unsanctioned Fight Without Honor match at Ring of Honor's Best in the World '16 between Steve Corino and B. J. Whitmer. Sullivan helped Whitmer win the match by striking Corino's head with his signature golden spike. He then formed an alliance with Whitmer and "Punishment" Damian Martinez in which Whitmer is billed as his second "son," and started terrorizing Corino as his "first son" for not letting his evil side out.

== Personal life ==
Sullivan was born in Cambridge, Massachusetts on October 26, 1949. He married American professional wrestling manager and model, Nancy Toffoloni, also known as ‘Woman,’ in 1985. It was Toffoloni’s second marriage. Toffoloni left Sullivan in 1997, and married Chris Benoit in 2000.

Starting in 1997, Sullivan's partner was LA Taylor (Linda Sullivan). She collaborated with Sullivan to publish the "Old School: Ring Squared" series, a fictionalized account of the beginnings of the wrestling business and the influences of television and the territories.

In 2022, Sullivan made an appearance on Judge Steve Harvey with wrestler and manager J. J. Dillon.

=== Health issues and death ===
In May 2024, Sullivan was involved in a "devastating accident" that had a major impact on his health. He underwent surgery and sustained multiple complications, and the accident reportedly affected his ability to function independently. On July 15, Sullivan claimed that he was in the process of recovering. Sullivan died from complications of a blood clot in Concord, Massachusetts, on August 9, 2024, at the age of 74.

== Championships and accomplishments ==
- Allied Independent Wrestling Federations
  - AIWF World Six Man Tag Team Championship (1 time, inaugural) – with R.R. Sullivan and D.V. Sullivan
- Cauliflower Alley Club
  - Men's Wrestling Award (2022)
- Central States Wrestling
  - NWA World Tag Team Championship (Central States version) (1 time) – with Ken Lucas
- Century Wrestling Alliance
  - CWA Heavyweight Championship (1 time)
- Championship Wrestling from Florida
  - NWA Florida Heavyweight Championship (1 time)
  - NWA Florida Tag Team Championship (4 times) – with Mike Graham (3), and Haystacks Calhoun (1)
  - NWA Southern Heavyweight Championship (Florida version) (4 times)
- Eastern Championship Wrestling
  - ECW Tag Team Championship (2 times) – with The Tazmaniac (Note: Although Sullivan and The Tazmaniac won the title twice, only their first reign is recognized officially by WWE, the current owners of ECW. These reigns also occurred prior to ECW's withdrawal from the NWA and prior to ECW declaring their tag title a "World" title.)
- Georgia Championship Wrestling
  - NWA Georgia Junior Heavyweight Championship (2 times)
  - NWA Georgia Tag Team Championship (1 time) – with Tony Atlas
  - NWA National Television Championship (2 times)
- Gulf Coast Championship Wrestling / Southeastern Championship Wrestling
  - NWA Continental Heavyweight Championship (2 times)
  - NWA Southeastern Tag Team Championship (2 times) – with Ken Lucas
  - NWA Southeastern United States Junior Heavyweight Championship (2 times)
  - NWA United States Tag Team Championship (Gulf Coast version) (1 time) – with Ken Lucas
- National Wrestling Alliance
  - NWA Hall of Fame (2014)
- New England Pro Wrestling Hall of Fame
  - Class of 2013
- NWA Mid-America
  - NWA Mid-America Television Championship (1 time)
  - NWA Southern Tag Team Championship (Mid-America version) (1 time) – with Len Rossi
  - NWA World Tag Team Championship (Mid-America version) (2 times) – with Robert Fuller (1), and Mike Graham (1)
- Pro Wrestling Illustrated
  - PWI Most Improved Wrestler of the Year (1981)
  - PWI ranked him #58 of the top 500 singles wrestlers in the PWI 500 in 1994
  - PWI ranked him #106 of the top 500 singles wrestlers of the "PWI Years" in 2003
- Southern Championship Wrestling
  - NWA Southern Heavyweight Championship (Tennessee version) (1 time)
- Southwest Championship Wrestling
  - SCW Southwest Heavyweight Championship (1 time)
- World Championship Wrestling
  - WCW World Tag Team Championship (1 time) – with Cactus Jack
  - NWA United States Tag Team Championship (Mid-Atlantic version) (1 time) – with Steve Williams
- Wrestling Observer Newsletter
  - Worst Worked Match of the Year (1996) with Arn Anderson, Meng, The Barbarian, Ric Flair, Lex Luger, Z-Gangsta and The Ultimate Solution vs. Hulk Hogan and Randy Savage - Towers of Doom match, Uncensored
