= Perry Saturn =

American professional wrestler (born 1966)

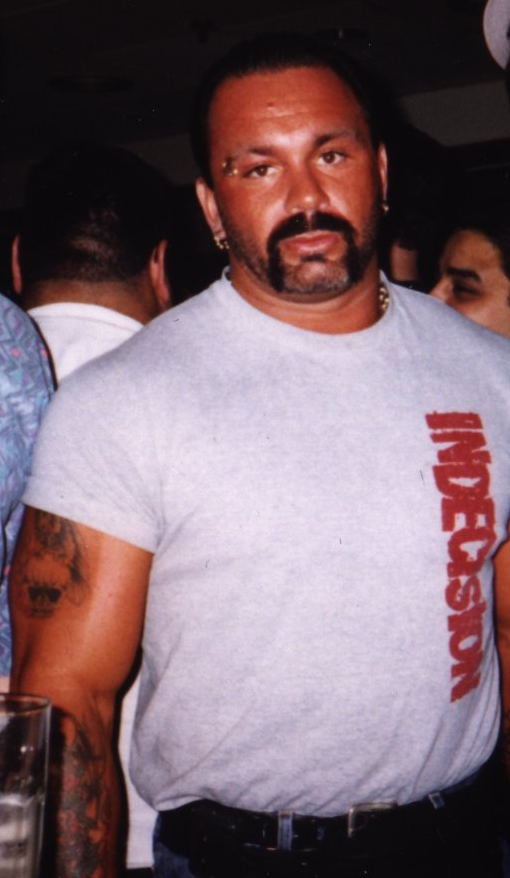
- Saturn in 1998

Personal information
- Born: Perry Arthur Satullo; October 25, 1966 (age 59) Cleveland, Ohio, U.S.
- Spouse: Lisa Kuhlemeier (m. 2009)

Professional wrestling career
- Ring name(s): The Gargoyle; The Iron Horseman; Perry Saturn; Peter Motts; Saturn; Dry Cleaner
- Billed height: 5 ft 10 in (1.78 m)
- Billed weight: 241 lb (109 kg)
- Billed from: Boston, Massachusetts
- Trained by: Scott Pieroni
- Debut: October 27, 1990
- Retired: July 7, 2013
- United States
- Allegiance: United States
- Branch: United States Army
- Units: United States Army Rangers

Perry Arthur Satullo (born October 25, 1966) is an American retired professional wrestler known by his ring name, Perry Saturn. After his debut in 1990, Saturn wrestled for promotions including Extreme Championship Wrestling (ECW), World Championship Wrestling (WCW), the World Wrestling Federation (WWF, now WWE) and Total Nonstop Action Wrestling (TNA). He is a former ECW World Tag Team Champion, WCW World Tag Team Champion, WCW World Television Champion, WWF European Champion and WWF Hardcore Champion.

== Early life ==
Satullo enlisted in the United States Army for four years at the age of seventeen, before eventually embarking on a career in professional wrestling. Satullo finished a bachelor's degree before he became a full-time wrestler. Satullo is also a certified graduate of the U.S. Army Ranger School and has served in the United States Army Rangers.

== Professional wrestling career ==
=== Early career (1990–1995) ===
Satullo began training as a professional wrestler at Killer Kowalski's school in Malden, Massachusetts around 1988, taking the ring name Saturn from the Roman god of the same name before later tweaking it to Perry Saturn. He debuted on October 27, 1990, in Waltham, Massachusetts. Satullo also wrestled in Kowalski's International Wrestling Federation as "The Iron Horseman", a cowboy complete with black leather stetson and chaps. Satullo eventually won the IWF Light Heavyweight Championship. Satullo began wrestling for independent promotions throughout New England, as well as touring Japan with New Japan Pro-Wrestling in 1993. In June 1992 he worked as enhancement talent as Peter Motts in WWF where he lost to Tatanka and the Legion of Doom.

While working as the manager of a nightclub in Boston, Satullo met bouncer George Caiazzo, who expressed an interest in becoming a wrestler. Satullo sent Caiazzo to Kowalski's school to train, and then offered to form a tag team with him. The Greek equivalent of the god Saturn was Cronus, so Satullo chose the ring name "John Kronus" for Caiazzo. As Saturn and Cronus were their cultures' respective gods of the harvest, Satullo proposed that they be known as "The Harvesters of Sorrow". Promoter Jerry Lawler advised Satullo that the significance of the name would not be evident to many fans, so they became known as The Eliminators.

The Eliminators wrestled their first match together at a United States Wrestling Association (USWA) house show in 1993 in Tennessee. They were hired at a starting salary of $40 a week (they later successfully negotiated a 100% pay raise), and shared an apartment with four other wrestlers. The Eliminators won the World Tag Team Championship on May 2, 1994, from Satullo's mentor, Eddie Gilbert, and Brian Christopher. They held the titles until June 13 when they were defeated by PG-13. On March 22, 1994, Saturn wrestled a dark match at a WWF Superstars taping in Lowell, MA. On April 2, 1995, The Eliminators wrestled on WCW Saturday Night in Atlanta, defeating Barry Houston and Kenny Kendall. Then on August 17, 1995, The Eliminators wrestled in a house show for WWF in Manchester, New Hampshire defeating Smooth Operator and Tim McNeeany.

=== Wrestle and Romance (1994–1995) ===
In November 1994, Satullo and Caiazzo made their debut with the Japanese Wrestle and Romance (WAR) promotion as part of its "Mega-Power" series. They returned to WAR in February 1995 as part of its "Revolutionary Ring '95" series, having a series of matches against Lionheart. They made a third tour in April 1995 as part of WAR's "Warfare Disruption" series, teaming with Warlord to face Fuyuki-Gun and Lion Do in a series of six-man cage matches. They made their final appearances with WAR in June–July 1995 as part of its "3rd Revolution Anniversary" series, including teaming with Héctor Garza in a loss to Bob Backlund, Jimmy Snuka, and Mil Máscaras at WAR's 3rd Anniversary Show in Tokyo's Ryōgoku Kokugikan.

=== Extreme Championship Wrestling (1995–1997) ===
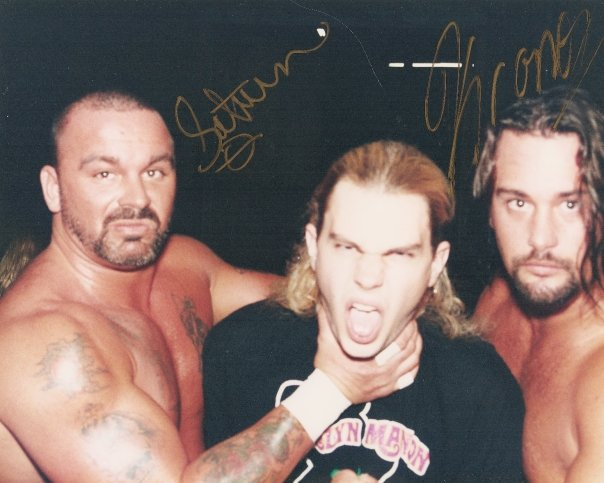
Saturn and John Kronus with a fan

The compactly-built and heavily tattooed Satullo and the high-flying Caiazzo caught the attention of Paul Heyman's Extreme Championship Wrestling (ECW) when they were brought in to job to the Steiner Brothers (Rick and Scott), and the Eliminators were hired by ECW in 1995. Heyman quickly abandoned plans to give them a sadism and masochism gimmick and instead booked them as an unstoppable force in the ECW tag division, giving them a manager, Jason. The Eliminators captured the ECW Tag Team Titles three times between 1996 and 1997, and feuded with teams such as The Gangstas and The Pitbulls. After The Pitbulls' manager Francine cut Saturn's hair, he shaved his head in a homage to Mickey Knox, the character depicted by Woody Harrelson in Natural Born Killers (in reality, Satullo was beginning to go bald).

Satullo was a trainer in the ECW House of Hardcore, a professional wrestling school at which Taz and Mikey Whipwreck also taught. Saturn was respected for his focus and drive on fundamentals and technical wrestling.

On May 31, 1997, in Trenton, New Jersey, Satullo tore his ACL when he landed on a crutch while executing a kick on Big Dick Dudley. After intense reconstructive surgery, he was given a recovery time of up to a year. He began rehabilitating after two months and returned to action in August. Impatient with what he regarded as Caiazzo's lack of motivation and dedication, he refused to reform the Eliminators. Paul Heyman offered to release him from his contract if he could find alternative employment, and Satullo entered into negotiations with World Championship Wrestling (WCW).

=== World Championship Wrestling (1997–2000) ===
==== Raven's Flock (1997–1998) ====
On August 28, 1997, Satullo was offered a job by WCW road agent Terry Taylor, who had been impressed by a bump that Satullo had taken in a scaffold match. He debuted in WCW on September 8, facing Billy Kidman, but was sidelined for a month afterward as his knee had not entirely healed. Later that year, he and Kidman joined The Flock, a heel stable of misfits and misanthropists led by the nihilistic Raven. Saturn's childhood was referenced, with Raven bringing up the violence Saturn incurred at the hands of his stepfather. The enforcer of The Flock, Saturn won gold on November 3, 1997, when he defeated Disco Inferno to win the World Television Championship. He held the title for a month before losing it back to Inferno in a rematch.

Beginning in 1998, Saturn began feuding with Glacier after Saturn's usage of the Super Kick offended Glacier, who deemed it a plagiarism of his Cryonic Kick finisher. Later in the year, Saturn was defeated by fellow Flock member Van Hammer in a "Loser Leaves The Flock" match. Raven threw Hammer out of the Flock instead. Problems arose between Raven and Saturn, and the latter eventually left The Flock, turning face by standing up to the domineering Raven. Raven held all the other Flock members in thrall, so Saturn challenged him to match for the September 13 Fall Brawl pay-per-view. If Saturn won, The Flock would be freed, but if Raven won, Saturn would become his slave.

In the meantime, on Nitro, Raven's lackey Lodi challenged him to a match, with the stipulation that Lodi would leave The Flock if Saturn won, and Saturn would become Lodi's servant until Fall Brawl if he lost. Saturn unexpectedly lost following copious interference from The Flock, and Lodi forced Saturn to carry his bags, made him hold up pro-Lodi signs at ringside, and ordered him to chant Lodi's name while Lodi wrestled. Lodi also used Saturn to defeat the enemies of The Flock.

Raven began questioning whether Saturn could "hurt those he wants to free so badly" and forced him to face Riggs. Saturn won cleanly, but refused Raven's order to break Riggs' fingers. When Saturn refused, Raven broke his fingers (Saturn would not break his agreement with Lodi because of a personal honor code, and Lodi ordered him to allow Raven to harm him). Raven repeatedly tried to goad Saturn into breaking his word, but was unable to do so. Finally, on September 13 at Fall Brawl, Saturn defeated Raven with help from Kidman, disbanding The Flock forever.

==== The Revolution (1999–2000) ====
Saturn went on to feud with Eddie Guerrero and Ernest Miller before beginning a rivalry with Chris Jericho. After Jericho cost Saturn a number of matches with the help of crooked referee Scott Dickinson, he mocked Saturn's complaints and accused him of crying "like a schoolgirl." This led to Jericho challenging Saturn to a "loser wears a dress for ninety days" match at Souled Out on January 17, 1999, which he won after some suspect officiating from Dickinson. Taking on a bizarre, goth transvestite gimmick, Saturn began wearing a variety of dresses to the ring and using a variation of Marilyn Manson's "The Beautiful People" as his entrance music. He appeared to begin enjoying wearing dresses and even wore cosmetics to complement them. Saturn finally stopped wearing them after defeating Jericho in a dog collar match at Uncensored on March 14, 1999.

Raven and Saturn reunited in March 1999, feuding with Dean Malenko and Chris Benoit, members of the Four Horsemen. At Slamboree the former Flock members defeated Benoit and Malenko and champions Rey Misterio, Jr. and Billy Kidman for the World Tag Team Championship. After Raven was injured, Saturn lost the titles to Bam Bam Bigelow and Diamond Dallas Page when Chris Kanyon, who substituted for Raven, betrayed him. He then teamed with Benoit in order to regain the titles. They were successful, but lost the titles several days later to Page and Kanyon. Benoit and Saturn continued to team together, and eventually formed a stable with Shane Douglas and Dean Malenko known as The Revolution. After Benoit left the Revolution to align himself with Bret Hart, the remainder of the stable began feuding with him. They then moved on to feuds with Jim Duggan and The Filthy Animals before disbanding.

Booker Kevin Sullivan opined that Saturn was incapable of getting over with fans, prompting the wrestler to negotiate with the World Wrestling Federation (WWF). In January 2000, Saturn, along with Benoit, Malenko and Eddie Guerrero, was granted a release from WCW and signed a three-year contract with the WWF.

=== World Wrestling Federation/Entertainment (2000–2002) ===
==== The Radicalz (2000–2001) ====
Benoit, Guerrero, Saturn, and Malenko, dubbed The Radicalz, debuted in the WWF during the Attitude Era on January 31, 2000. They appeared in the front row of a live episode of Raw and brawled with the New Age Outlaws after The Road Dogg literally fell into their laps. Cactus Jack urged them to help him fight the heel McMahon-Helmsley Faction, but they quickly turned on Jack in order to gain employment from Triple H, who was then controlling the WWF. Benoit left the group on amicable terms when he became sidetracked by his feud with Chris Jericho, and the three remaining Radicalz began feuding with Too Cool and Chyna. After Guerrero left to be with Chyna, Saturn and Malenko teamed together for a while before disbanding.

Saturn moved into the Hardcore division, pursuing then-champion Crash Holly. After Malenko tried to win the Hardcore Championship for himself, the former partners turned on one another. Guerrero was drawn into their feud, leading to a triple threat match at Judgment Day on May 21 with Guerrero's European Championship on the line. Guerrero was able to retain with the assistance of Chyna.

Saturn was later joined by Terri Runnels, who became his manager and onscreen girlfriend. After failing to proceed in the King of the Ring tournament, Saturn went after the European Championship once more, finally beating Guerrero at Fully Loaded on July 23. Terri's rivalry with The Kat led to a feud between Saturn and Al Snow, and on the August 31 episode of SmackDown! Snow defeated Saturn for the European Championship.

The Radicalz reformed in late 2000, feuding with the revived D-Generation X (DX) and defeating them at Survivor Series on November 19. That same evening, the Radicalz attacked Stone Cold Steve Austin during his match with Triple H, briefly reforging their alliance with Triple H.

Dean Malenko began trying to win the affections of Lita, the valet of The Hardy Boyz. This led to a feud between the Radicalz and The Hardy Boyz, with The Radicalz defeating The Hardy Boyz at Armageddon on December 10. Saturn helped Guerrero defeat Test at WrestleMania X-Seven on April 1, 2001, but Guerrero later left the Radicalz once more, again reducing the faction to just Saturn and Malenko (Benoit had left in early 2001), with Terri still accompanying Saturn. The remaining Radicalz returned to the tag team division.

==== "Moppy" and departure (2001–2002) ====
After a match on the May 17 episode of Jakked, in which he legitimately attacked jobber Mike Bell, Saturn immediately underwent a significant gimmick change and, possibly as punishment for his actions, was involved in storylines about his becoming infatuated with a mop. After receiving head trauma in matches against The Acolytes Protection Agency (APA) and Raven, Saturn began acting eccentrically and speaking nonsensically, allegedly as the result of a concussion. Saturn began uttering the phrase "you're welcome" at inopportune intervals, and then fell in love with Moppy, an inanimate mop which he believed was alive, similar to Wilson the volleyball in the 2000 film Cast Away. This gimmick went over well with the fans, leading to a face turn. Terri Runnels told Saturn to choose between Moppy and her, and was infuriated when Saturn chose the mop. She left Saturn for Raven, who helped her enact vengeance on Saturn by stealing Moppy and feeding her into a woodchipper. Saturn in turn gained a measure of revenge when he defeated Raven at Unforgiven on September 23. After this, Saturn dropped the gimmick, but still remained a face, casually wrestling in tag matches at Sunday Night Heat.

In March 2002 the WWF initiated its brand extension in which Raw and SmackDown! had their own rosters of WWF wrestlers. During the draft, Saturn was SmackDown!'s 29th pick, the 58th pick overall and the final pick of the entire draft. Saturn's last WWF match was a tag team match with Hugh Morrus defeating Mr. Perfect and Shawn Stasiak on March 28 at a house show. Then just a month later Saturn reinjured his ACL, sidelining him for seven months, before being released by the company in November 2002.

=== Total Nonstop Action Wrestling (2003) ===
Saturn debuted in the Nashville, Tennessee-based promotion NWA-TNA on March 26, 2003, teaming with The Sandman and The Disciples of the New Church (Brian Lee and Slash) to defeat the Harris Brothers and Triple X (Christopher Daniels and Elix Skipper). Saturn and The Sandman formed a short-lived stable known as "Team Extreme" with fellow ECW alumni Justin Credible and New Jack. On April 16, 2003, Saturn faced the debuting Mike Awesome, losing by disqualification after his stablemates interfered on his behalf. One week later, Saturn, New Jack and The Sandman defeated Awesome and The New Church in a hardcore match. Saturn wrestled his final match with NWA-TNA on June 18, 2003, defeating Kenzo Suzuki by disqualification.

=== International promotions (2002–2004) ===
Immediately after leaving the WWF, Saturn toured Europe with the World Wrestling All-Stars promotion in their European tour, mainly working against Sabu. Saturn worked for New Japan Pro-Wrestling, Hawaii and on the American independent circuit before retiring from professional wrestling due to injuries in 2004. His last match at that time was on December 4, 2004, teaming with TS Aggressor, defeating Brian Ash and Glen Octane for Impact Pro Wrestling in Delta, Iowa. He would be homeless for years due to drug addiction and his whereabouts were unknown.

=== Return to wrestling (2011–2013) ===
Saturn returned to wrestling in 2011, wrestling his first match in over seven years on October 15, 2011, at the AWE Night of the Legends pay-per-view show from Fishersville, Virginia facing CW Anderson. Saturn won the match. Saturn won his first championship in over a decade as he defeated Arik Cannon & Sir Bradley Charles in a Triple Threat match for the 3XW Pure Wrestling championship on April 27 in Des Moines, Iowa. In March 2013, Saturn wrestled at Jerry Lynn's retirement show for Heavy On Wrestling in Minneapolis, Minnesota. He competed in the opening six-man tag match, where his team came out victorious. Saturn entered the Extreme Rising World Championship tournament which was eventually won by Stevie Richards, he was defeated in the first round by Luke Hawx.

=== Other appearances ===
In October 2021, Saturn appeared at Awesome Wrestling Entertainment's Night of the Legends in Fishersville, Virginia.

== Personal life ==
Satullo claims to have been involved in an April 2004 altercation with two men when he came to the aid of a woman they were raping behind a strip club. He reportedly fought the men and was shot with a .25 caliber handgun in the back of the neck and in the right shoulder, to which he originally thought he had received a punch, as a result of the scuffle. Satullo disappeared from public view and was not seen for several years, with his family and friends unaware of his whereabouts. Satullo re-emerged in 2010, having resolved his addiction.

Satullo married Lisa Marie Kuhlemeier in June 2009. He had been married on three prior occasions. He has a teenage grandson that he looks after, in addition to an adult son and daughter.

During an interview with Bill Apter in September 2016, Satullo revealed that he was dealing with a "traumatic brain injury" that limited his abilities. In November 2016, The Boston Globe reported that Satullo had joined a class action lawsuit against WWE, litigated by Konstantine Kyros, who has been involved in a number of other lawsuits against them, alleging that "he is suffering from multiple symptoms of repetitive traumatic brain injuries and is undergoing neurological care." US District judge Vanessa Lynne Bryant dismissed the lawsuit in late 2018.

On May 24, 2026, Satullo started his YouTube channel, PerrySaturnOfficial, where he posts videos and interviews discussing his career in pro wrestling. The channel gained over 10,000 followers within the first month of launch.

== Championships and accomplishments ==
- 3XWrestling
  - 3XW Pure Wrestling Championship (1 time)
- Extreme Championship Wrestling
  - ECW World Tag Team Championship (3 times) – with John Kronus
- Impact Pro Wrestling
  - IPW Tag Team Championship (1 time) - with James Jeffries
- International Wrestling Federation
  - IWF Light Heavyweight Championship (2 times)
  - IWF North American Championship (1 time)
  - IWF Tag Team Championship (1 time) - with Terra Ryzing
- New England Pro Wrestling Hall of Fame
  - Class of 2018
- Pro Wrestling Illustrated
  - PWI ranked him No. 47 of the 500 best singles wrestlers of the "PWI 500" in 1999
  - PWI ranked him No. 227 of the 500 best singles wrestlers of the "PWI Years" in 2003
  - PWI ranked him No. 89 of the 100 best tag teams of the "PWI Years" with John Kronus in 2003
- United States Wrestling Association
  - USWA World Tag Team Championship (1 time) – with John Kronus
- World Championship Wrestling
  - WCW World Tag Team Championship (2 times) – with Raven (1) and Chris Benoit (1)
  - WCW World Television Championship (1 time)
- World Wrestling Federation
  - WWF European Championship (1 time)
  - WWF Hardcore Championship (2 times)
- Universal Championship Wrestling
  - Universal Heavyweight Championship (1 time)

== See also ==
- List of solved missing person cases (2000s)
- The Eliminators
- The Flock
- The Radicalz
- The Revolution
