= Brittany Brown =

American professional wrestler

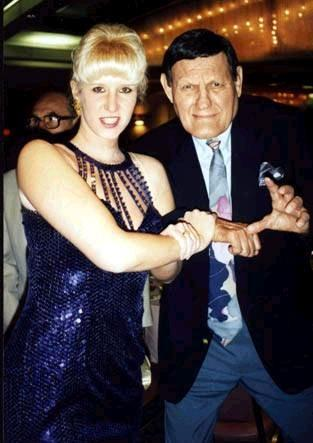
- Brown and Killer Kowalski in 1994

Personal information
- Born: August 31 Scituate, Massachusetts, U.S.

Professional wrestling career
- Billed height: 6 ft 1 in (185 cm)
- Billed weight: 160 lb (73 kg)
- Billed from: Hollywood, California
- Trained by: The Fabulous Moolah; Donna Christanello; Killer Kowalski
- Debut: 1985
- Retired: 2013

Brittany Brown is an American professional wrestler, former promoter and current trainer.

== Overview ==
Brown has competed as a wrestler from the mid-1980s to the 2010s. She has worked with the Ladies Professional Wrestling Association, The Fabulous Moolah's Ladies International Wrestling Association, as well as in Killer Kowalski's International Wrestling Federation, National Wrestling Alliance, World Championship Wrestling, New England Wrestling Federation, World Wide Wrestling Alliance, North American Wrestling Alliance, Empire Pro Wrestling, World Wrestling Alliance (Massachusetts) and New England Pro Wrestling.

She had feuds most notably with Shelley Francis, ‘Black Venus’ Jean Kirkland, Wendi Richter, Brandi Wine, Leilani Kai, Rustee the Foxx Thomas, Rosebud, Jamie West, Brandi Alexander, Babyface Nellie, Ivory, and Heidi Lee Morgan.

Brown is one of three female professional wrestlers that broke her neck and resumed her career for many years after healing.

== Professional wrestling career ==
In 1984, Brown began her training to become a professional wrestler at The Fabulous Moolah's Girl Pro Wrestling School in Columbia, South Carolina, under the direct training of The Fabulous Moolah and Donna Christanello. She then trained under Killer Kowalski and was the Ladies Champion of Kowalski's International Wrestling Federation for well over a decade.

On February 27, 1998, Brown beat number-one contender Brandi Alexander and retained her NWA New Jersey Championship title at the Third Annual Eddie Gilbert Memorial Brawl at the Airport Radisson Hotel in Philadelphia, Pennsylvania. The Fabulous Moolah was in Brown's corner while Fred The Elephant Boy from The Howard Stern Show was at ringside with Ms. Alexander.

At a Killer Kowalski Birthday Wrestling show, lady wrestler Violet Flame and her husband Steve King, along with an unknown referee changed the finish so that Flame could win a match. Former ICW wrestler ‘The Boston Bad Boy’ Rocky Raymond was in attendance and along with wrestler Chris Duffy were ready to pummel King (who is quite small for a wrestler) but Brown got in between them to stop the fight.

Brown later worked for Kowalski as a trainer to both male and female students at his school outside of Boston, Massachusetts. During this time, she was the IWF Ladies Champion, the Ladies Champion of the National Wrestling Alliance and champion of several independent promotions including EPW, NWF, WWA, and the NEWF. She was known as The Boston Bad Girl due to her 'in-ring' villainous tactics.

She and a former partner began a New England–based independent wrestling promotion called the World Wrestling Alliance in 1999. This ran for many years and featured many wrestlers from the WWF Dojo and several stars from WWE’s Tough Enough.

== Championships and accomplishments ==
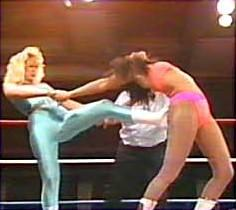
Brittany & Shelley Francis in Las Vegas, Nevada

- Cauliflower Alley Club
  - Other honoree (1994)
- International Wrestling Federation
  - IWF Ladies Championship (4 times)
- New England Pro Wrestling Hall of Fame
  - Class of 2013
- New England Pro Wrestling
  - NEPW Women's Championship (1 time)
  - New England Wrestling Federation Women's Champion (2 times)
  - Empire Pro Wrestling Women's Champion (3 Times)
  - NWA NJ Ladies Champion
  - World Wrestling Alliance Women's Champion (4 times)
  - NAWA - Ladies Champion
  - New England Pro Wrestling Hall of Fame Woman's Honoree/inductee – 2013
- World Wide Wrestling Alliance
  - WWWA Woman's Championship (1 time)
  - 2022 Recipient of ISPW Lifetime Achievement Award

== Honors ==
In 1994, Brown was inducted into the Cauliflower Alley Club along with other female inductees Candi Devine, Sherri Martel, Kitty Adams, and Susan Green as well as male inductees Gorilla Monsoon and Pedro Morales. She was also the first female to be elected as an officer of the club under then-President Lou Thesz.

Brown was on the Board of The LIWA run by The Fabulous Moolah and Mae Young, and was honored by the organization before becoming an Officer.

In 2013 Brown was inducted into the New England Professional Wrestling Hall of Fame.

Brown was also honored with the ISPW Lifetime Achievement Award in 2022.

== Other work ==
Brown was very closely linked to Queen frontman Freddie Mercury from her mid-teens until his death in 1991. She met him when he personally chose her for the music video of their song "Body Language" when she was 15. She went on to perform in many Queen videos as well as for other bands including Aerosmith, Bad Company, The Eagles and Guns and Roses across almost four decades. She was also partnered with Aerosmith singer Steven Tyler from 1993-1997. As of early 2025, Brown is the newest DJ on FunLand Radio and is currently in a relationship with one of Dog the Bounty Hunter’s sons.
