= Damien Kane =

American professional wrestler (born 1960)

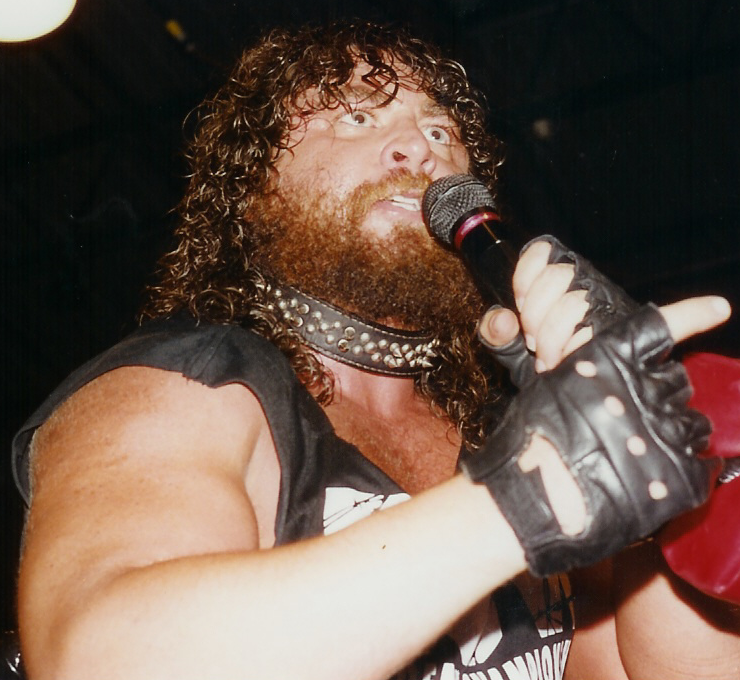

Personal information
- Born: Edward Bazzaza; April 16, 1960 (age 66) Reading, Pennsylvania
- Spouse: Lady Alexandra
- Children: 1

Professional wrestling career
- Ring name(s): Damien Kane; Ed Bonzo
- Billed height: 5 ft 10 in (1.78 m)
- Billed weight: 250 lb (110 kg)
- Trained by: Killer Kowalski
- Debut: 1980
- Retired: 1997

Edward Bazzaza (born April 16, 1960), known by his ring name Damien Kane, is an American retired professional wrestler and manager. He is best known for his appearances with the Philadelphia-based Extreme Championship Wrestling promotion in the mid-1990s.

== Professional wrestling career ==
=== Early career (1980s) ===
After being trained in Killer Kowalski's Malden, Massachusetts-based school, Kane debuted in the International Wrestling Federation in 1980. While in the IWF, Kane wrestled against prominent wrestlers such as Dominic DeNucci, Larry Zbyszko and The Valiant Brothers.

After his stint in the IWF, Kane began to work throughout the independent circuit. After joining the Continental Wrestling Alliance and winning the promotion's World Tag Team Championship with Sweet Daddy White, Kane met future tag team partner D. C. Drake. After both worked for the CWA, Kane and Drake moved on to the National Wrestling Federation, where Kane performed booking, television production and wrestling for the promotion. During his time in the NWF, Kane met a young Paul Heyman, who was working for the promotion as a photographer and commentator, and helped establish Heyman as a manager under the name Paul E. Dangerously name.

=== Extreme Championship Wrestling (1995–1996) ===
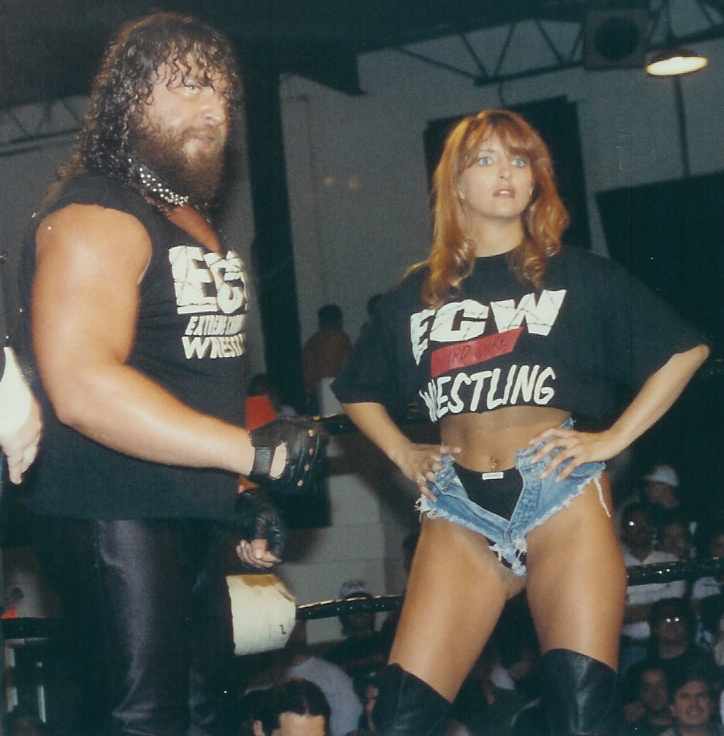
Kane (left) with his wife and valet, Lady Alexandra, in Extreme Championship Wrestling.

Due to his relationship with Heyman, Kane later ended up working for him in Extreme Championship Wrestling, where he was best known for managing The Headhunters as well forming a tag team with Devon Storm. Together, Kane and Storm successfully defeated the Dudley Boyz (Buh Buh Ray and D-Von) by disqualification (a rare occurrence in ECW) at A Matter of Respect and later feuded with The Bad Crew, a tag team he had formerly managed.

In late 1996, Kane and his then wife Lady Alexandra left ECW after making "inappropriate remarks" towards the then recently fired Missy Hyatt. The pair made their last appearance at Natural Born Killaz on August 24 when, following Devon Storm's loss to Louie Spicolli, Kane was attacked by Spicolli. His last match in ECW was a loss to Louie Spicolli.

=== Later Career (1996–1997) ===
After ECW, Kane worked for Mid Eastern Wrestling Federation in Maryland in 1996. Then in 1997 worked for Independent Professional Wrestling Alliance and retired.

== Retirement ==
Relocating to Florida shortly thereafter, Kane and Alexandra later moved with their son Damien Jr. to Texas to pursue an acting career in early 2007.

== Filmography ==
List of appearances in film and on television
| Year | Title | Role | Notes | Ref. |
|---|---|---|---|---|
| 2008 | Soul Flyers | Andy Simms | Short film | |
| 2008 | Night To Fly | Jack Barnes | Feature film | |
| 2008 | Blood on the Highway | Axe Guy | Feature film | |
| 2010 | Fed Up | Himself | Episode: "Work Associates and Arthritis" | |

== Championships and accomplishments ==
- East Coast Wrestling Federation
  - ECWF Tag Team Championship (1 time) - with Sweet Daddy White
