= Big John Studd =

American professional wrestler and actor (1948–1995)

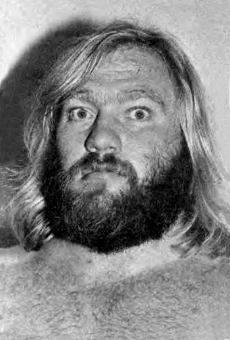
- Studd, May 1982

Personal information
- Born: John William Minton; February 19, 1948 Butler, Pennsylvania, U.S.
- Died: March 20, 1995 (aged 47) Burke, Virginia, U.S.
- Spouse: Donna Conklin (m. 1978)
- Children: 3

Professional wrestling career
- Ring name(s): Big John Studd; Captain USA; Chuck O'Connor; Executioner #2; The Mighty Minton
- Billed height: 6 ft 10 in (208 cm)
- Billed weight: 365 lb (166 kg)
- Billed from: Los Angeles, California
- Trained by: Killer Kowalski
- Debut: 1972
- Retired: 1993

John William Minton (February 19, 1948 – March 20, 1995) was an American professional wrestler and actor, better known by his ring name Big John Studd. Studd is best known for his appearances with the World Wide Wrestling Federation/World Wrestling Federation in the 1970s and 1980s. He also appeared in minor roles in a few movies.

Studd held a number of championships over his career, including the NWA American Heavyweight Championship, NWA Mid-Atlantic Tag Team Championship, and WWWF World Tag Team Championship, and was the winner of the 1989 Royal Rumble. He was posthumously inducted into the WCW Hall of Fame in 1995 and the WWE Hall of Fame class of 2004.

== Early life ==
John William Minton was born and raised in a farm in Butler, Pennsylvania. He attended Butler High School, where he played basketball. He then joined the United States Army and served as a military police officer in Vietnam.

== Professional wrestling career ==
=== Early career (1972–1973) ===
Minton was trained for a career in professional wrestling by Killer Kowalski and Charlie Moto in Los Angeles. He debuted in 1972 under the ring name "The Mighty Minton" for NWA Hollywood Wrestling. He formed a tag team with "Superstar" Billy Graham, facing the Tolos Brothers (Chris and John) in a series of matches.

=== World Wide Wrestling Federation (1972–1973) ===
In mid-1972, Studd joined the World Wide Wrestling Federation under the ring name "Chuck O'Connor". His most notable match of this run took place on September 12, when he unsuccessfully challenged Pedro Morales for the WWWF World Heavyweight Championship. He left the WWWF in February 1973.

=== Mid-Atlantic Championship Wrestling (1974–1983) ===
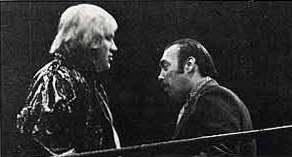
Studd (left) with Gary Hart, March 1977

As Chuck O'Connor, Minton joined Mid-Atlantic Championship Wrestling in January 1974. In 1977, he got the ring name Big John Studd from promoter Paul Boesch, who said "My God, you look like a stud." In 1978, Studd teamed up with Ken Patera to win the Mid-Atlantic Tag Team titles. He also competed as Masked Superstar #2, but unmasked after losing to Blackjack Mulligan. In early 1981, Studd gained several unsuccessful title shots at the NWA World Heavyweight Championship, which was held by Dusty Rhodes at the time.

=== World Wide Wrestling Federation (1976–1977) ===
In 1976, Studd returned to the World Wide Wrestling Federation, where he donned a mask and performed as "Executioner #2", teaming with Executioner #1 as The Executioners. On May 11, 1976, The Executioners defeated Louis Cerdan and Tony Parisi to win the WWF World Tag Team Championship, but they were stripped of them on October 26, after a third Executioner (Nikolai Volkoff) interfered in a title defense against Chief Jay Strongbow and Billy White Wolf. Studd left the WWWF once more in early 1977.

=== American Wrestling Association (1975–1976, 1980–1981) ===
From 1975 to 1976, Studd performed for the American Wrestling Association. He returned in 1980 and feuded with Mad Dog Vachon and The Crusher before leaving in 1981.

=== World Wrestling Federation (1982–1986, 1988–1989) ===
==== Feud with André the Giant (1982–1986) ====
Studd jumped to the World Wrestling Federation in late 1982, managed by Freddie Blassie. Studd quickly became a monster heel, adopting a gimmick of bringing a stretcher to the ring and beating his opponents so badly they would be taken out on the stretcher.

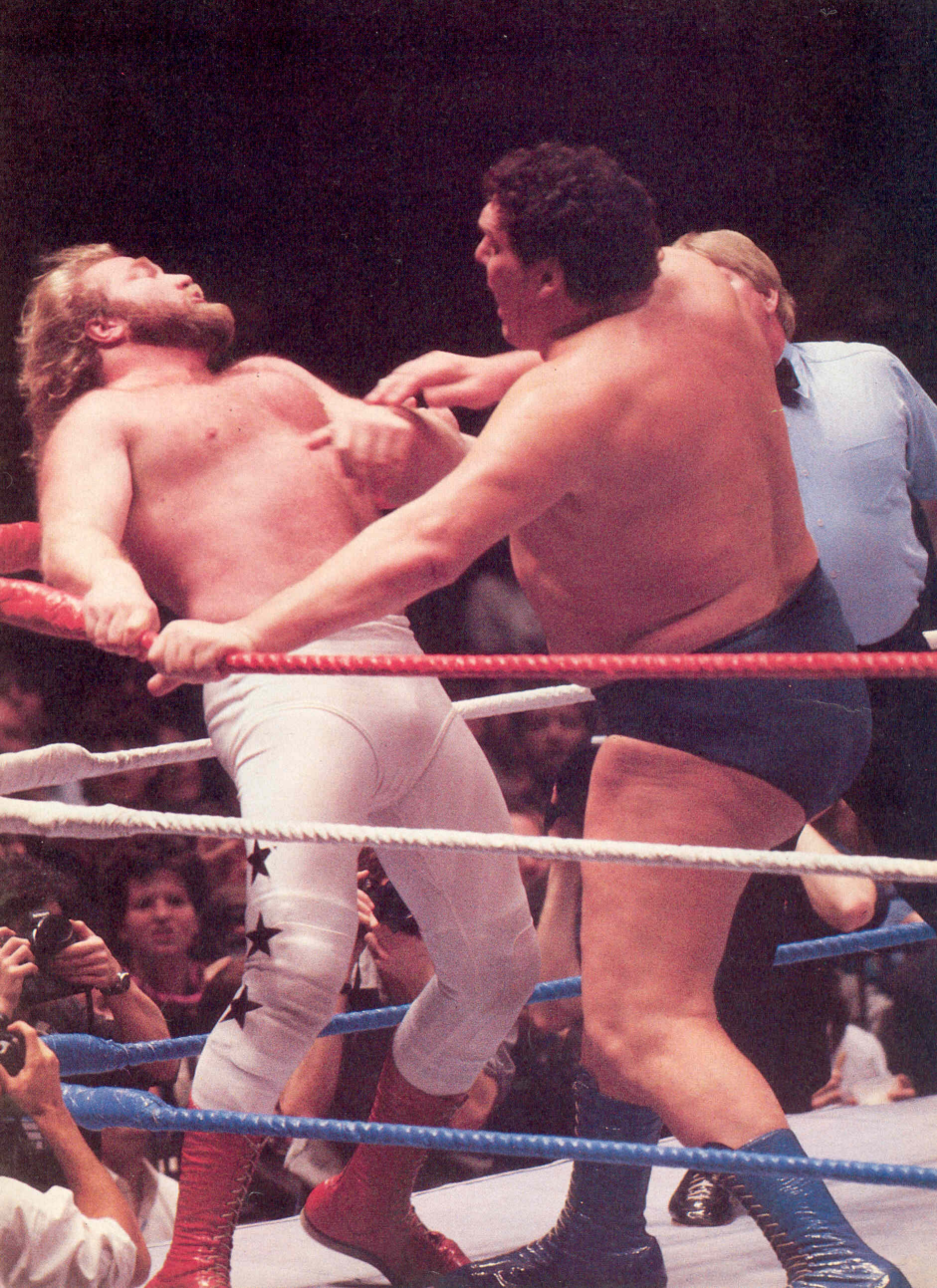
Studd (left) facing André the Giant at WrestleMania in March 1985

While Studd became a top challenger for Bob Backlund's WWF World Championship, it was his feud with 7 ft 4 in (224 cm), 520 pounds (240 kg) André the Giant over who was professional wrestling's 'true giant' that earned him main event status. Studd and Blassie had issued a "Bodyslam Challenge," offering $10,000, and later, $15,000, to any wrestler who could slam Studd before boasting that he could not be slammed.

After several wrestlers were unsuccessful in answering Studd's challenge, Andre accepted and was about to slam Studd before Blassie attacked Andre from behind, as Studd grabbed the ring ropes to prevent the slam. The Andre–Studd feud raged throughout 1983, and Andre got the upper hand and slammed Studd several times, once with enough force to collapse the entire ring.

Several times the two met inside a steel cage, where André slammed Studd, and used a sitdown splash from the top rope onto his chest to knock him out. Despite this, Studd began declaring himself the "True Giant of Wrestling" while continuing to insist he could not be, and had never been, slammed. By 1984, with his feud with Andre still raging, Studd was challenging then-new champion Hulk Hogan, who was also successful in slamming Studd, for the title.

In December, Studd was paired with Bobby "The Brain" Heenan (whom Studd became friends with while they were in the AWA). During a televised tag team match on WWF Championship Wrestling featuring Studd and fellow Heenan Family member Ken Patera against André the Giant and S. D. Jones. The match ended by disqualification after persistent rulebreaking by Studd and Patera, who attacked André afterwards and cut his hair.

André set out for revenge and accepted Studd's challenge to a "$15,000 Bodyslam Challenge" match at the first WrestleMania, whereby if Andre failed to slam Studd before the time limit (or Studd managed to slam Andre), André would be forced to retire from wrestling. At WrestleMania on March 31, 1985, André won by slamming Studd.

Studd then formed an alliance with fellow Heenan Family member King Kong Bundy, injuring André's sternum in August. Their feud continued for the rest of that year and into 1986, with André recruiting faces such as Hulk Hogan, Tony Atlas, Junkyard Dog and Hillbilly Jim to team with him. At WrestleMania 2 on April 7, 1986, Studd participated in the WWF vs. NFL battle royal, targeting Atlanta Falcons player Bill Fralic after a pre-match confrontation during an interview with "Mean" Gene Okerlund. He eliminated William "The Refrigerator" Perry, who in turn eliminated Studd; André went on to win the battle royal.

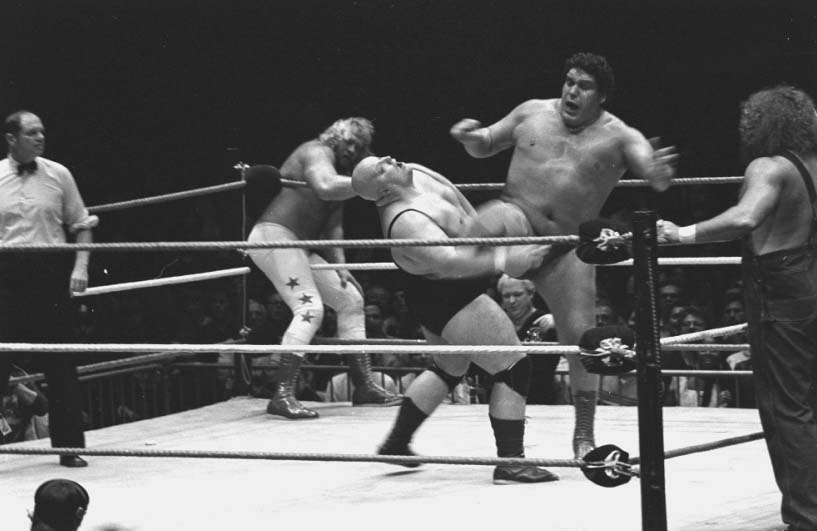
Andre the Giant and Hillbilly Jim facing King Kong Bundy and Big John Studd in an October 1985 tag team match at Madison Square Garden

The Andre–Studd feud took on a new dimension in 1986, when, in the wake of Andre's increasing health problems related to gigantism and acromegaly, his role as Fezzik in the movie The Princess Bride, and his planned tour of Japan, a storyline was developed to have André compete in a tag team called The Machines. The "Machines" angle began when André did not show up for several tag team matches against Bundy and Studd.

Heenan successfully campaigned to get André suspended, only for André to reappear shortly thereafter in a mask, billing himself as a Japanese wrestler called the Giant Machine. Studd, along with Bundy and Heenan, insisted that Andre and the Giant Machine were one and the same, and set out to prove their point by vowing to unmask the Giant Machine during a series of tag team matches. The Giant Machine's partners included Blackjack Mulligan (as "Big Machine") and Bill Eadie (as "Super Machine"), with Studd and Bundy saying in interviews that they knew who The Machines were and had never heard of Japanese wrestlers with a South-Texas accent (Mulligan/Big Machine) or a South-Florida accent (Eadie/Super Machine).

Heenan repeatedly claimed that no Japanese wrestler or person was 7'4" and over 500 lbs and spoke with a French accent. Neither Studd, Bundy, or Heenan, could unmask The Machines, and their true identities remained a secret.

Bundy and Studd feuded with other established tag teams in 1986 and contended for the WWF Tag Team Championship, held by The British Bulldogs (Davey Boy Smith and the Dynamite Kid). During a televised match later that year, Studd and Bundy argued after they lost a match to the Bulldogs, teasing a feud between the two which never materialized. Studd's last match during his original 1980s WWF run came on the November 15, 1986 episode of WWF Superstars of Wrestling, when he teamed with Bundy to defeat The Machines (in a match not involving the Giant Machine).

Despite leaving the WWF, Studd's presence was still made known in a WWF Magazine article published shortly before WrestleMania III, where he supported André in his upcoming match against Hogan, contending that Hogan's friendship with André was a ruse, to duck him as a potential challenger to the title. Studd retired from wrestling to focus on his acting career.

==== Feud with The Heenan Family (1988–1989) ====
After retiring for two years, Studd announced his return to the WWF on the Brother Love Show in December 1988. An elated Bobby Heenan appeared on the set to welcome Studd back to the Heenan family. With Heenan now also managing his old adversary André the Giant, Studd rejected the offer and ran Heenan off the Brother Love set, thus turning face. Studd went on to feud with several members of the Heenan family, including André, who had turned heel during Studd's absence, and Haku.

At Royal Rumble on January 15, 1989, Studd won the Royal Rumble match by last eliminating Ted DiBiase. He then served as a special guest referee in the match between Jake "The Snake" Roberts and André at WrestleMania V on April 2, which Roberts won when he disqualified André, who attacked Studd from behind. Studd's last match with the WWF took place on June 4, with Hillbilly Jim wrestling in Studd's place later that month. Studd quit the WWF over a financial dispute with Vince McMahon.

=== Independent circuit and retirement (1989–1993) ===
In the following years, Studd wrestled sporadically on the independent circuit, including for North American Wrestling Association (NAWA), where he was the first NAWA Champion. He also came out with his own line of workout and vitamin supplements. Studd was responsible for training Ron Reis, who he had tagged with as the "Giants of Wrestling". In tribute, Reis would make his WCW debut as Big Ron Studd.

Studd wrestled his last match in October 1993 at a show promoted by Killer Kowalski against The Honky Tonk Man, filling in for Jimmy Snuka, who could not make the event. After the match, Studd collapsed due to low stamina. In 1994, he was called as a prosecution witness at the Vince McMahon steroid distribution trial in Long Island, New York, but due to his declining health, Studd, under oath, admitted to using steroids via telephone from his home.

== Personal life ==
Minton met his wife Donna Conklin, a former competitive swimmer, at the Le Pichet restaurant in Montreal, which was co-owned by his WWF rival Andre. They had three children: Robert, Jannelle, and Sean. Sean is also a professional wrestler going by the ring name Big Sean Studd. In 1989, Minton said that his left knee, shoulder and lower back were all damaged from wrestling.

== Death ==
In the fall of 1993, Minton noticed a lump in his armpit, and a doctor found a large tumor in his chest. It remitted after chemotherapy, and he was told he might wrestle again in six months, but it returned in 1994. When no suitable bone marrow donor was found, and he was given around a month to live, Minton underwent an autotransplantation procedure with a 7% success rate. Again, the tumor remitted and he went home. Around September 1994, Minton's lungs collapsed and he went back to the hospital.

In February 1995, Minton returned for another round of chemotherapy, and it was found that the tumor had spread widely. He died after a battle with liver cancer and Hodgkin's disease on March 20, 1995.

== Filmography ==
=== Film ===
Year	Title	Role	Notes
1984	Micki & Maude	Himself	
1985	The Protector	Huge Hood	
1987	Double Agent	Igor	
1989	Hyper Space	Psycho	
1990	Caged in Paradiso	Big Man	
1991	Harley Davidson and the Marlboro Man	Jack Daniels	
1991	The Marrying Man	Dante	

=== Television ===
Year	Title	Role	Notes
1985	The A-Team	Himself	Episode: "Body Slam"
1987	Hunter	Randy	Episode: "Bad Company" or "Bad Companions"
1988	Beauty and the Beast	Erlick	Episode: "To Reign in Hell"

== Championships and accomplishments ==
- European Wrestling Union
  - World Super Heavyweight Championship ( 1 time )

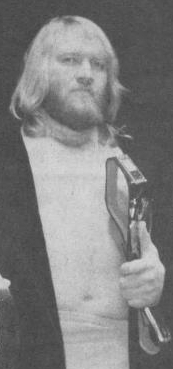
Studd as the NWA National Tag Team Champion, August 1982

- 50th State Big Time Wrestling
  - NWA North American Heavyweight Championship (Hawaii version) (1 time)
  - NWA Hawaii Tag Team Championship (1 time) – with Buddy Rose
- Championship Wrestling from Florida
  - NWA Florida Global Tag Team Championship (1 time) – with Jimmy Garvin
- Georgia Championship Wrestling
  - NWA National Tag Team Championship (1 time) – with Super Destroyer
- Maple Leaf Wrestling
  - NWA Canadian Heavyweight Championship (Toronto version) (1 time)
- Mid-Atlantic Championship Wrestling
  - NWA Mid-Atlantic Tag Team Championship (4 times) – with Ric Flair (1), Ken Patera (1), Masked Superstar #1 (1), and Roddy Piper (1)
- NWA Big Time Wrestling
  - NWA American Heavyweight Championship (1 time)
  - NWA Texas Tag Team Championship (1 time) – with Bull Ramos
  - NWA Brass Knuckles Championship (1 time)
- NWA Southern Championship Wrestling
  - NWA Tennessee Southern Heavyweight Championship (1 time)
- Pro Wrestling Illustrated
  - PWI Tag Team of the Year (1976) – with Killer Kowalski
  - PWI ranked him #60 of the top 500 singles wrestlers of the "PWI Years" in 2003
- World Championship Wrestling
  - WCW Hall of Fame (Class of 1995)
- World Wrestling Association
  - WWA World Tag Team Championship (1 time) – with Ox Baker
- World Wide Wrestling Federation / World Wrestling Federation / World Wrestling Entertainment
  - WWWF World Tag Team Championship (1 time) – with Executioner #1
  - Royal Rumble (1989)
  - WWE Hall of Fame (Class of 2004)
- Wrestling Observer Newsletter
  - Most Overrated (1984)
  - Worst Feud of the Year (1984) – vs. Andre The Giant
  - Worst Feud of the Year (1986) – with King Kong Bundy vs. The Machines

== See also ==
- List of premature professional wrestling deaths

Preceded by "Hacksaw" Jim Duggan	Royal Rumble winner 1989	Succeeded by Hulk Hogan
