= Executioners (professional wrestling) =

Professional wrestling tag team

The Executioners is the name of several tag teams and single masked wrestlers who wrestled in the BYWA, TWA, AWF and the World Wide Wrestling Federation.

== The Executioners (1970s) ==
Executioners

Tag team
- Members: Executioner #1; Executioner #2; Executioner #3
- Billed heights: Executioner #1: 6 ft 7 in (2.01 m); Executioner #2: 6 ft 10 in (2.08 m); Executioner #3: 6 ft 4 in (1.93 m)
- Combined billed weight: 758 lb (344 kg)
- Debut: 1976
- Disbanded: 1977
- Years active: 1976–1977

The first version of Executioners was founded by Executioner #1, who was a masked wrestler, wrestling for World Wide Wrestling Federation. In 1976 he trained Executioner #2, and the two became a tag team in WWWF.

Together, the Executioners captured the WWWF Tag Team Championship on May 11, 1976 by defeating Louis Cerdan and Tony Parisi. Later, they were joined by a third masked wrestler who called himself Executioner #3.

The Executioners were stripped of their titles on December 7 because Executioner #3 was used in a title defense against Chief Jay Strongbow and Billy White Wolf. A three-team tournament was announced after Executioner #3 was unmasked as Nikolai Volkoff.

Volkoff selected Tor Kamata as his partner and then The Executioners & Nikolai Volkoff and Tor Kamata were defeated by Chief Jay Strongbow and Billy White Wolf in the three-team tournament.

=== Championships and accomplishments ===
- WWWF Tag Team Championship (1 time) - Executioner #1 & Executioner #2

== List of wrestlers who wrestled as an Executioner ==
=== 1976–1977 ===
- Killer Kowalski
- Big John Studd
- Nikolai Volkoff

=== 1981–1984 ===
- Ron Shaw
- Charley Rhoads
- Frank Savage

=== 1985 ===
- Buddy Rose (at WrestleMania I)
- Charlie Fulton
- Danny Davis (later became Mr.X)

=== 1986 ===
- Jerry Fazio
- Terry Manton

=== 1988 ===
- Van Van Horne (Memphis)

=== 1988–1994 ===
- Duane Gill ("Pain")
- Barry Hardy ("Agony")

=== 1996–1997 ===
- Terry Gordy
