= Killer Kowalski =

Canadian professional wrestler (1926–2008)

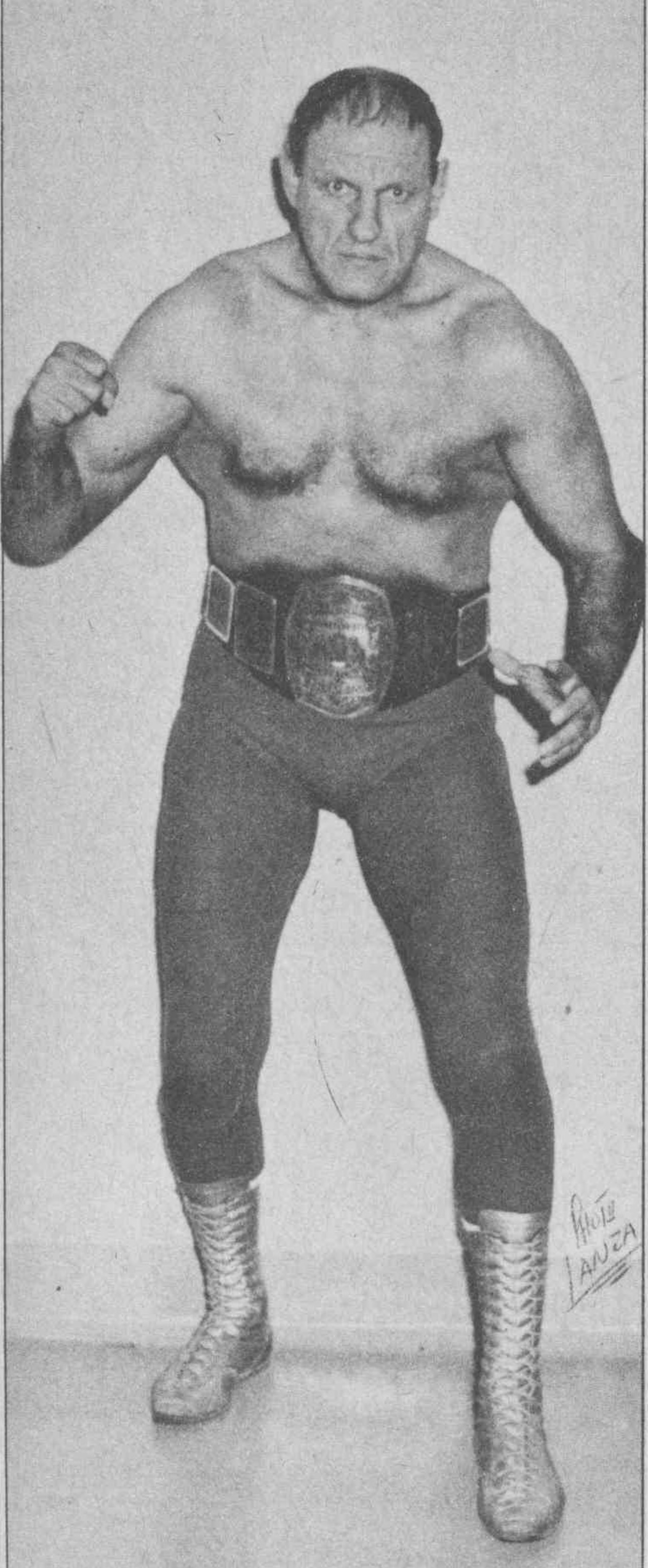
- Kowalski in 1973

Personal information
- Born: Edward Władysław Spulnik; October 13, 1926 Windsor, Ontario, Canada
- Died: August 30, 2008 (aged 81) Everett, Massachusetts, U.S.
- Spouse: Theresa Ferrioli (m. 2006)

Professional wrestling career
- Ring name(s): The Polish Apollo; Hercules Kowalski; Killer Kowalski; The Masked Destroyer; The Masked Executioner; Tarzan Kowalski
- Billed height: 6 ft 7 in (201 cm)
- Billed weight: 280 lb (127 kg)
- Trained by: Lou Thesz
- Debut: 1947
- Retired: March 14, 2008

Wladek Kowalski (born Edward Władysław Spulnik; October 13, 1926 – August 30, 2008) was a Canadian professional wrestler, known by his ring name Killer Kowalski.

Kowalski wrestled for numerous promotions during his career, including the National Wrestling Alliance (NWA) and World Wide Wrestling Federation (WWWF, now WWE), and was a known heel. He held numerous championships including the WWWF World Tag Team Championship with Big John Studd billed as the Executioners and managed by Lou Albano.

After retiring in 1977, Kowalski started a professional wrestling school in Malden, Massachusetts and trained many professional wrestlers, including Studd, Triple H, Chyna, Eddie Edwards, Frankie Kazarian, Kofi Kingston, Damien Sandow, Fandango, Brittany Brown, April Hunter, John Kronus, Perry Saturn, and Tommaso Ciampa.

== Early life ==
Wladek Kowalski was born Edward Władysław Spulnik, the son of Polish immigrants Antoni Spulnik and Maria Borowska; he, his older sister Wanda, and his younger brother Stanley were born and raised in Windsor, Ontario. Years later, he told interviewers that he never expected to be a wrestler – by the age of 14, he was already 6 feet 4 inches (193 cm), and because he was thin for his height, he began working out at the local YMCA, but had no plan to go into athletics at that time.

When he entered college, his major was electrical engineering. He worked part-time at the Ford Motor Company plant in Detroit to help pay his way.

== Professional wrestling career ==
There are several stories of how Spulnik became a wrestler. The most common one is that while attending the University of Detroit (some sources say Assumption College in Windsor), he heard that there was an opportunity to make good pay by wrestling. He was only being paid $50 a week at the Ford plant and was told he could make more as a wrestler. Since he already had an athletic build, he decided to give wrestling a try and began attending a wrestling school.

When he first wrestled professionally, he was known as "Tarzan Kowalski", but was also called Hercules Kowalski, Killer Kowalski (this nickname is used as early as 1950) and even The Polish Apollo, according to newspaper reports from 1950 to 1951. During the Cold War his name was changed to Wladek Kowalski, which was supposed to sound more menacing.

Kowalski wrestled from 1947 to 1977 in a number of organizations, including the National Wrestling Alliance (NWA) and American Wrestling Association (AWA) as a heel.

Kowalski's rise in the business came quickly. His first recorded match occurred on May 6, 1948, and by November 29 of the same year, Kowalski was facing NWA champion Orville Brown in a heavyweight championship match. Kowalski stood out in his era for his larger-than-normal size, and for a faster-paced style in the ring. He wrestled as a demonstrative "heel," or villain, except when facing the even-more-hated Buddy Rogers. In his matches with Rogers, Kowalski would adopt a more serious "babyface" approach. Outside of the ring, however, Kowalski was considered so friendly and polite that some wrestling promoters complained about the way he would "drop character" in public.

In December 1972, Kowalski became the first wrestler to pin André the Giant in North America, in what was billed as a "Battle of the Giants." Photographs from the Quebec City match helped to establish André's reputation in American wrestling magazines, since they showed him towering over the better-known Kowalski. Kowalski had done much the same to boost Giant Baba's fame in Japan, with a televised 1963 match.

=== Incidents ===
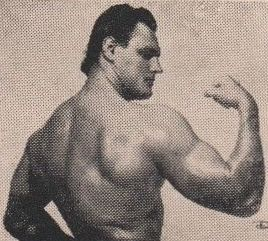
Kowalski in 1951

On October 15, 1952, in a match in Montreal versus Yukon Eric, Kowalski ripped off a part of Yukon Eric's ear while performing a knee drop. In reality, Eric's ears were already badly cauliflowered due to years of abuse and the injury was an accident, but it fortified Kowalski as being a ruthless villain who gleefully maims his opponents. Kowalski attempted to visit his opponent in the hospital and began laughing along with Eric at how silly the bandages looked, with Kowalski recalling years later, "I swear, the first thing I thought of was Humpty Dumpty on the wall. Yukon Eric looked at me, shook his head, and smiled. I started laughing and he laughed, too." When the incident was reported in the paper the next day, it stated that Kowalski showed up at the hospital and laughed at his victim rather than with him, furthering Kowalski's image as a heel. The incident sparked a long-running series of grudge matches between the two wrestlers which took place throughout North America. By the time the feud had run out of steam several years later, Yukon Eric joked to Kowalski about the small size of an audience, "God, that's a lousy house. I might have to sacrifice another ear."

Kowalski also gained some notoriety in Boston for an incident in late June 1958 when he was wrestling Pat O'Connor. The guest referee was former boxing great Jack Dempsey, who suffered a kick to the diaphragm and had to be hospitalized. Dempsey did not blame Kowalski, and both said it was an accident, but this further cemented the Killer's reputation as a villain.

In 1967, the top-rated Australian television talk show host Don Lane irritated Kowalski during an apparently friendly interview and was attacked with the Kowalski claw hold.

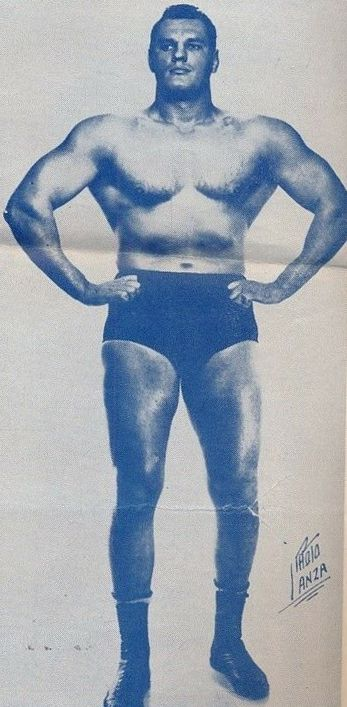
Kowalski in 1953

Also in the late 1950s, Kowalski fought what was supposed to be a best two out of three match in Fall River, Massachusetts against Mr. Moto. Just before the bell starting the first fall, Kowalski had his back turned to Moto while doing some stretches in his corner. Moto raced across the ring and hit Kowalski over the head with one of the clogs with which he had walked into the ring. Of course, the referee did not see this happen. The bell rang and a seemingly dazed Kowalski staggered around the ring and was quickly pinned by Moto. Kowalski was billed as the heavyweight champion at that time (at least in eastern Massachusetts) and, as such, was not supposed to lose the match. Just after the second fall started, Kowalski was hit in the right eye with a pea or bean shot by someone in the audience using a pea shooter. Semi-blinded and genuinely stunned, Kowalski staggered around the ring covering his eye with his right hand. Moto did not know what to do. Finally, he approached Kowalski, bumped into him and fell to the mat. Kowalski reached down, applied the claw hold and Moto was not only counted out, but deemed by the referee too hurt to continue. The two raced out of the ring to a chorus of boos from the audience and dodged various objects being thrown at them. As a side note, the two had arrived 45 minutes late for the match. The Fall River Herald News reported in its next day morning edition that these two "mortal enemies" were late because the car in which they had ridden together to the match had broken down on the way.

=== World Wide Wrestling Federation ===
Kowalski became the main antagonist of Bruno Sammartino in the World Wide Wrestling Federation in the 1960s and 1970s. Kowalski formed a tag team with fellow heel Gorilla Monsoon and took Red Berry as his manager; Monsoon and Kowalski held the WWWF United States Tag Team Championship, winning the belts in two straight falls from Skull Murphy and Brute Bernard on Washington, D.C. television, and later losing to The Tolos Brothers in two straight falls in Teaneck, New Jersey in December 1963. On May 11, 1976, Kowalski won the WWF World Tag Team Championship with Big John Studd. Both men wore black masks and tights and called themselves "The Executioners". However, they were stripped of the championship, following the interference of a third Executioner during a title defense against Chief Jay Strongbow and Billy White Wolf. The Executioners lost a match for the vacant title on December 6 to Strongbow and White Wolf and never regained the championship.

=== Retirement and training ===
After his WWWF retirement in 1977, Kowalski started a professional wrestling school in Malden, Massachusetts. Due to his health, he ceased to be involved with it in 2003, and the school subsequently moved to North Andover. Among the alumni of this school are Triple H, Chyna, Perry Saturn, John Kronus, Brittany Brown, Big John Studd, Damien Kane, Christopher Nowinski, Matt Bloom, April Hunter, R. J. Brewer, Kazarian, Nicole Raczynski, Kenny Dykstra, Tommaso Ciampa, Damien Sandow and Fandango. Mike Hollow, a student of Kowalski, later formed his own school, the Elite Pro Wrestling Training Center, which became affiliated with WWE's Independent Development (ID) program in 2024.

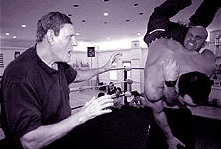
Kowalski training John Quinlan and The Boston Brawler in 2000

Kowalski returned to wrestling on independent shows in 1982, and worked only sparingly after that. In 1992 he fought John Tolos to a no-contest for Frontier Martial-Arts Wrestling in Japan. His last match took place in 1993, when Kowalski was 66 years old losing to Baron Von Raschke at the Maccabiah Mania fundraiser show in Livingston, New Jersey. Kowalski would remain a fixture on the Northeast independent wrestling scene taking autograph and personal appearances. His last appearance was on March 14, 2008, for Top Rope Promotions at an event in North Adams, Massachusetts, where he came to the ring and put the claw on local wrestler "Gorgeous" Gino Giovanni and was declared the winner of the segment.

He also made numerous post-retirement television appearances, including Late Night with David Letterman in 1982, and was featured in a comic role in Michael Burlingame's surrealist film To a Random in 1986. "Lost in the B-Zone", a music video for Birdsongs of the Mesozoic which was derived from this film, also prominently featured Kowalski.

On June 11, 2007, Kowalski was inducted into the National Polish-American Sports Hall of Fame.

== Personal life ==
Kowalski married Theresa Ferrioli on June 19, 2006.

He became a vegetarian after being influenced by middle-distance runners Roger Bannister and John Landy in 1953. Kowalski did not eat meat, dairy or eggs. He has been described as an "outspoken vegetarian" and vegan. In the 1960s, Kowalski claimed to be the only vegetarian professional wrestler. One of his favorite restaurants to go to was the Kowloon Restaurant in Saugus, Massachusetts, where a signed picture of him can be found on their walls. Kowalski did not drink alcohol or smoke.

He took interest in photography and had a book published in 2001.

== Death ==
Kowalski began experiencing escalating health problems in the time leading up to his death. The Sun received the report on Kowalski from his friend, wrestling legend Bruno Sammartino, that Kowalski had to go to a rehabilitation center in Everett, Massachusetts, where he was recovering from a knee injury. It seemed he was getting better, until he suffered a heart attack on August 8, 2008. According to Slam! Sports, the Quincy Patriot Ledger, and other sources, Kowalski's family was apprised that he would not recover. When Kowalski was taken off life support on August 18, subsequent news reports erroneously stated that he had died. Kowalski died on August 30, 2008. He was survived by his wife and family.

== Championships and accomplishments ==
- 50th State Big Time Wrestling
  - NWA United States Heavyweight Championship (Hawaii version) (once)
- Atlantic Athletic Commission
  - AAC World Heavyweight Championship (once)
- Canadian Pro-Wrestling Hall of Fame
  - Class of 2024
- Cauliflower Alley Club
  - Iron Mike Mazurki Award (2002)
- Central States Wrestling
  - NWA Central States Heavyweight Championship (once)
  - NWA Central States Tag Team Championship (once) - with Bulldog Austin
- Championship Wrestling from Florida
  - NWA Southern Heavyweight Championship (Florida version) (once)
- International Wrestling Federation
  - IWF Heavyweight Championship (once)
  - IWF Tag Team Championship (once) - with Johnny Valiant
- Montreal Athletic Commission
  - MAC World Heavyweight Championship (13 times)
- NWA All-Star Wrestling
  - NWA Pacific Coast Tag Team Championship (Vancouver version) (twice) - with Ox Anderson (1) and Gene Kiniski (1)
- NWA Hollywood Wrestling
  - NWA Americas Heavyweight Championship (once)
  - NWA Americas Tag Team Championship (once) - with Kinji Shibuya
- NWA San Francisco
  - NWA Pacific Coast Heavyweight Championship (San Francisco version) (once)
  - NWA Pacific Coast Tag Team Championship (San Francisco version) (once) - with Hans Herman
- New England Pro Wrestling Hall of Fame
  - Class of 2008
- Pro Wrestling Illustrated
  - PWI Tag Team of the Year (1976) - with Big John Studd
  - PWI Stanley Weston Award (2010)
- Professional Wrestling Hall of Fame and Museum
  - (Class of 2003)
- Southwest Sports, Inc. / Big Time Wrestling
  - NWA Texas Brass Knuckles Championship (twice)
  - NWA Texas Tag Team Championship (once) (Note: Defeated Duke Keomuka and Danny Hodge in a handicap match to win the title.)
- Stampede Wrestling
  - NWA Canadian Heavyweight Championship (Calgary version) (twice)
  - NWA International Tag Team Championship (Calgary version) (twice) - with Jim Wright (Note: Wrestled under the name of the Masked Destroyer when winning this title.)
  - Stampede Wrestling Hall of Fame (Class of 1995)
- United States Wrestling Federation
  - USWF Tag Team Championship (1 time) – with Ox Baker
- World Championship Wrestling (Australia)
  - IWA World Heavyweight Championship (5 times)
  - IWA World Tag Team Championship (4 times) - with Skull Murphy (2), Bill Miller (1), and Mark Lewin (1)
- World Wide Wrestling Federation/World Wrestling Federation
  - WWWF United States Tag Team Championship (1 time) - with Gorilla Monsoon
  - WWWF World Tag Team Championship (1 time) - with Executioner #2
  - WWF Hall of Fame (Class of 1996)
- Wrestling Observer Newsletter
  - Wrestling Observer Newsletter Hall of Fame (Class of 1996)

== See also ==
- List of vegetarians
