= MCW Rage Television Championship =

Professional wrestling championship

Details
- Promotion: MCW Pro Wrestling (MCW)
- Date established: February 21, 2001
- Current champion: Reggie Collins
- Date won: July 26, 2026
Statistics
- First champion: Gregory Martin
- Most reigns: Ryan McBride, Tyler Hilton, Joe Keys, and Ken Dixon (3 reigns)
- Longest reign: Shawn Patrick (329 days)
- Shortest reign: Ryan McBride, Tyler Hilton, and Joe Keys (<1 day)

The MCW Rage Television Championship is a professional wrestling television championship owned by the MCW Pro Wrestling (MCW) promotion. The title was created and debuted on February 21, 2001 at a MCW live event. The current champion is Reggie Collins, who is in his first reign.

The inaugural champion was Gregory Martin, who defeated Ronnie Zukko in the finals of a tournament to win the championship on February 21, 2001 at an MCW live event.

== Title history ==
Key
No.	Overall reign number
Reign	Reign number for the specific champion
Days	Number of days held
+	Current reign is changing daily

No.	Champion	Championship change			Reign statistics		Notes	Ref.
No.	Champion	Date	Event	Location	Reign	Days	Notes	Ref.
Maryland Championship Wrestling (MCW)
1	Gregory Martin	February 21, 2001	MCW	Glen Burnie, Maryland	1	75	Defeated Ronnie Zukko in a tournament final to become the inaugural champion.	
—	Vacated	April 28, 2001	—	—	—	—	The championship was vacated after Martin left the promotion.	
2	Billy Redwood	April 28, 2001	Unknown	Aberdeen, MD	1	81	Defeated Ronnie Zukko in a tournament final to win the vacated championship.	
3	Julio DiNero	July 18, 2001	Shane Shamrock Memorial Cup	Glen Burnie, MD	1	107		
4	Marcus Jordan	November 2, 2001	MCW	Chestertown, MD	1	7		
5	2-Dope	November 9, 2001	Live event	Mount Joy, PA	1	1		
6	Marcus Jordan	November 10, 2001	Unknown	Hampstead, MD	2	193		
7	Romeo Valentino	May 22, 2002	MCW Tribute To The Legends	Glen Burnie, MD	1	252		
8	Joey Matthews	January 29, 2003	Live event	Glen Burnie, MD	1	106		
9	Doug Delicious	May 15, 2003	Live event	Glen Burnie, MD	1	62		
—	Deactivated	July 16, 2003	—	—	—	—	The championship was deactivated as Maryland Championship Wrestling runs what would be, at the time, the promotion's last event.	
10	Josh Daniels	July 22, 2006	MCW Red, White, Black & Bruised	Laurel, MD	1	50	Defeated Danny Jaxx, Eddie Edwards and Qenaan Creed in a four corners match to revive the championship.	
11	Danny Jaxx	September 10, 2006	MCW Tribute To The Legends	Dundalk, MD	1	168		
12	Tyler Hilton	February 25, 2007	MCW Anniversary 2007	Dundalk, MD	1	28		
13	Chad Bowman	March 25, 2007	MCW March Madness - When Monsters Collide	Dundalk, MD	1	42		
14	Tyler Hilton	May 6, 2007	MCW Xtreme Measures 2007	Dundalk, MD	2	126		
15	Patrick Brink	September 9, 2007	MCW Kickoff Chaos	Dundalk, MD	1	108		
16	Tyler Hilton	December 26, 2007	MCW Holiday Homecoming 2007	Dundalk, MD	3	<1		
—	Deactivated	January 1, 2008	—	—	—	—	The championship was retired.	
17	Qenaan Creed	April 11, 2009	MCW Xtreme Measures 2009	Dundalk, MD	1	118	Defeated Cobian in the finals of a twelve wrestlers tournament to revive the championship.	
18	Adam Carelle	August 7, 2009	MCW Summer Heat 2009	Dundalk, MD	1	141		
19	Ryan McBride	December 26, 2009	MCW Holiday Hell 2009	Dundalk, MD	1	63	This was a ladder title for title match, in which McBride defended the MCW Cruiserweight Championship.	
20	Adam Cole	February 27, 2010	MCW Anniversary 2010	Dundalk, MD	2	154	This was a last man standing match.	
21	Cobian	July 31, 2010	MCW Shamrock Cup X	Dundalk, MD	1	244	Cobian along with Tommy Dreamer defeated Adam Cole and Tyler Hilton in an extreme Rules match. Cobian was recognized as the champion.	
22	Ronnie Zukko	April 1, 2011	Unknown	Severn, MD	1	211		
23	Oliver Grimsly	October 29, 2011	Live event	Dundalk, MD	1	62		
24	Chris Clow	December 30, 2011	MCW Holiday Hell	Dundalk, MD	1	98		
25	Alexander James	April 6, 2012	Unknown	Dundalk, MD	1	267		
26	Shawn Patrick	December 29, 2012	Unknown	Dundalk, MD	1	329		
27	Ruckus	November 23, 2013	MCW Aggravated Assault 2013	Joppa, MD	1	153		
28	Chuck Lennox	April 25, 2014	MCW Body Slam Autism 4	Dundalk, MD	1	161		
29	The Bruiser	October 3, 2014	MCW Waldorf Warfare	Waldorf, MD	1	1		
30	Chuck Lennox	October 4, 2014	MCW A Tribute To Legends	Dundalk, MD	2	147		
31	Brandon Scott	February 28, 2015	MCW Winter Blast 2015	Hollywood, MD	1	279		
32	Ken Dixon	December 4, 2015	MCW Holiday Havoc 2015	Felton, DE	1	22		
33	Billy Gunn	December 26, 2015	MCW Seasons Beatings 2015	Joppa, MD	1	84	During this reign Maryland Championship Wrestling was changed to MCW Pro Wrestling.	
MCW Pro Wrestling (MCW)
34	Ken Dixon	March 19, 2016	MCW Spring Fever Tour 2016 - Day 1	Frederick, MD	2	251		
35	Drolix	November 25, 2016	2nd Annual Showcase Of Champions	Winston-Salem, NC	1	65	This was a title for title match, in which Drolix defended the MCW Heavyweight Championship.	
—	Vacated	January 29, 2017	—	—	—	—	The championship was vacated due to Drolix suffering a torn ACL.	
36	Dante Caballero	March 3, 2017	MCW Mat Madness	Joppa, MD	1	134	Defeated Brandon Scott in the finals of an eight wrestlers tournament to vacated championship.	
37	Maxwell Jacob Friedman	July 15, 2017	MCW Shane Shamrock Memorial Cup XVIII - Day 2	Joppa, MD	1	77	This was a three–way match also involving Greg Excellent.	
38	Greg Excellent	September 30, 2017	MCW Tribute To The Legends	Joppa, MD	1	286	This was a three–way match also involving Dante Caballero.	
39	Ryan McBride	July 13, 2018	MCW Shane Shamrock Memorial Cup XVIII - Day 1	Joppa, MD	2	189		
40	Scarlett Bordeaux	January 18, 2019	MCW Winter Blast 2019 - Day 1	Joppa, MD	1	1		
41	Ryan McBride	January 19, 2019	MCW Winter Blast 2019 - Day 2	Hollywood, MD	3	<1		
42	Elijah King	January 19, 2019	MCW Winter Blast 2019 - Day 2	Hollywood, MD	1	35		
43	Joe Gacy	February 23, 2019	MCW Anniversary 2019	Joppa, MD	1	63		
44	Joe Keys	April 27, 2019	MCW Shattered Dreams	Joppa, MD	1	161		
45	Joe Gacy	October 5, 2019	MCW Tribute To The Legends 2019	Joppa, MD	2	140		
46	Joe Keys	February 22, 2020	MCW Anniversary 2020	Joppa, MD	2	273	This was a best of five series tables match in which Keys won score 3-1.	
47	Lio Rush	November 21, 2020	MCW Bruiser Strong	Joppa, MD	1	245	This was a three–way match also involving Ken Dixon.	
—	Vacated	July 24, 2021	—	—	—	—	The championship was vacated due to Lio Rush suffering an injury.	
48	Kekoa	July 24, 2021	Resurrection 2021	Joppa, MD	1	133		
49	Joe Keys	December 4, 2021	MCW Season’s Beatings 2021	Joppa, MD	3	<1		
50	Kekoa	December 4, 2021	MCW Season’s Beatings 2021	Joppa, MD	2	64		
51	Demarcus Kane	February 6, 2022	MCW Winter Blast 2022 - Night 2	Glen Burnie, MD	1	251		
52	Moses	October 15, 2022	MCW Autumn Armageddon 2022 - Night 3	Joppa, MD	1	76		
53	‘Miami’ Mike Walker	December 30, 2022	MCW Season’s Beatings 2022	Joppa, MD	1	190	This was a three–way match also involving Demarcus Kane.	
54	Myles Hawkins	July 8, 2023	MCW Summer Slamboree 2023 - Night 1	Hollywood, MD	1	154		
55	James Ellsworth	December 9, 2023	MCW Season’s Beatings 2023 - Night 1	Frederick, MD	1	21		
56	Myles Hawkins	December 30, 2023	MCW Season’s Beatings 2023 - Night 2	Joppa, MD	2	224		
57	Alex Divine	August 10, 2024	MCW Dynamo Runs the Show - The Brandon Holman Memorial Show	Joppa, MD	1	225		
58	Alec Odin	March 23, 2025	MCW Spring Fever - Night 2	Dundalk, MD	1	209		
59	Jadis Quinn	October 18, 2025	MCW Autumn Armageddon 2025 - Night 3	Joppa, MD	1	7		
60	Alec Odin	October 25, 2025	MCW Autumn Armageddon 2025 - Night 4	Hampstead, MD	2	105		
61	Ken Dixon	February 7, 2026	MCW Winter Blast 2026 - Night 2	Hollywood, MD	3	41		
62	Danny Grandview	March 20, 2026	MCW Spring Fever 2026 - Night 3	Frederick, MD	1	128		
63	Reggie Collins	July 26, 2026	MCW Summer Slamboree 2026 - Night 2	Hollywood, MD	1	77+		

== Combined reigns ==
As of October 11, 2026.

†	Indicates the current champion

Rank	Wrestler	No. of reigns	Combined days
1	Joe Keys	3	434
2	Myles Hawkins	2	378
3	Shawn Patrick	1	329
4	Alec Odin	2	314
4	Ken Dixon	3	314
6	Chuck Lennox	2	308
7	Adam Carelle/Cole	2	295
8	Greg Excellent	1	286
9	Brandon Scott	1	279
10	Alexander James	1	267
11	Ryan McBride	3	252
11	Romeo Valentino	1	252
13	Demarcus Kane	1	251
14	Lio Rush	1	248
15	Cobian	1	244
16	Alex Divine	1	225
17	Ronnie Zukko	1	211
18	Joe Gacy	2	203
19	Marcus Jordan	2	200
20	Kekoa	2	197
21	’Miami’ Mike Walker	1	190
22	Danny Jaxx	1	168
23	Tyler Hilton	3	154
24	Ruckus	1	153
25	Dante Caballero	1	134
27	Danny Grandview	1	128
26	Qeenan Creed	1	118
28	Pat Brink	1	108
29	Julio Dinero	1	107
30	Joey Matthews	1	106
31	Chris Clow	1	98
32	Billy Gunn	1	84
33	Billy Redwood	1	81
34	Reggie Collins †	1	77+
35	Maxwell Jacob Friedman	1	77
36	Moses	1	76
37	Gregory Martin	1	66
38	Drolix	1	65
39	Doug Delicious	1	62
39	Oliver Grimsly	1	62
41	Josh Daniels	1	50
42	Chad Bowman	1	42
43	Elijah King	1	35
44	James Ellsworth	1	21
45	Jadis Quinn	1	7
46	2-Dope	1	1
46	Scarlett Bordeaux	1	1
46	The Bruiser	1	1
