= MCW Women's Championship =

Professional wrestling championship

Details
- Promotion: MCW Pro Wrestling
- Date established: October 3, 2014
- Current champion: Tiara James
- Date won: November 15, 2026
Statistics
- First champion: Renee Michelle
- Most reigns: Gia Scott (8 reigns)
- Longest reign: Gia Scott (630 days)
- Shortest reign: Renee Michelle (<1 day)

The MCW Women's Championship is a professional wrestling championship owned by the MCW Pro Wrestling promotion. The title was created and debuted on October 3, 2014 at a MCW live event.

The inaugural champion was Renee Michelle, who defeated Amber Rodriguez in the finals of a tournament to win the championship on October 3, 2014 at an MCW live event.

The current champion is Tiara James, who is in her first reign.

== Title history ==
Key
| No. | Overall reign number |
| Reign | Reign number for the specific champion |
| Days | Number of days held |
| + | Current reign is changing daily |

| No. | Champion | Championship change | | | Reign statistics | | Notes | Ref. |
| No. | Champion | Date | Event | Location | Reign | Days | Notes | Ref. |
|---|---|---|---|---|---|---|---|---|
Maryland Championship Wrestling (MCW)
| 1 | Renee Michelle | October 3, 2014 | Waldorf Warfare | Waldorf, MD | 1 | 1 | Michelle defeated Amber Rodriguez in a tournament final to become the inaugural champion. | |
| 2 | Amber Rodriguez | October 4, 2014 | A Tribute to Legends | Dundalk, MD | 1 | 258 | | |
| 3 | Mickie James | June 19, 2015 | Ladies Night | Glen Burnie, MD | 1 | 147 | Victoria was the special guest referee with Melina as the special outside ring enforcer. | |
| 4 | Kimber Lee | November 13, 2015 | Autumn Armageddon Tour | Waldorf, MD | 1 | 43 | | |
| 5 | Renee Michelle | December 26, 2015 | Seasons Beatings 2015 | Joppa, MD | 2 | 167 | Mickie James was the special guest referee. Also during this reign Maryland Championship Wrestling was changed to MCW Pro Wrestling. | |
MCW Pro Wrestling (MCW)
| 6 | Brittany Blake | June 10, 2016 | Slamboree | Joppa, MD | 1 | 148 | This was a three–way match, also involving Kimber Lee. | |
| 7 | Renee Michelle | November 5, 2016 | Autumn Armageddon Tour 2016 – Day 4 | Joppa, MD | 3 | <1 | | |
| 8 | Melina | November 5, 2016 | Autumn Armageddon Tour 2016 – Day 4 | Joppa, MD | 1 | 350 | | |
| — | Vacated | October 21, 2017 | — | — | — | — | The championship was vacated after Melina suffered a knee injury. | |
| 9 | Sahara Se7en | October 21, 2017 | Autumn Armageddon Tour 2017 | Manchester, MD | 1 | 154 | Se7en defeated Brittany Blake to win the vacant championship. | |
| 10 | Brittany Blake | March 24, 2018 | Breakthrough: Proving Grounds | Joppa, MD | 2 | 231 | | |
| 11 | Gia Scott | November 10, 2018 | Autumn Armaggedon 2018 | Hollywood, MD | 1 | 69 | | |
| 12 | Aria Palmer | January 18, 2019 | Winter Blast 2019 - Day 1 | Joppa, MD | 1 | 1 | | |
| 13 | Gia Scott | January 19, 2019 | Winter Blast 2019 - Day 2 | Hollywood, MD | 2 | 71 | | |
| 14 | Aria Palmer | March 31, 2019 | Spring Fever 2019 | Joppa, MD | 2 | 188 | | |
| 15 | Renee Michelle | October 5, 2019 | Tribute to the Legends 2019 | Joppa, MD | 4 | 83 | This was a three–way match, also involving Gia Scott. | |
| 16 | Gia Scott | December 27, 2019 | New Years Extravaganza | Baltimore, MD | 3 | 630 | | |
| 17 | Ray Lyn | September 17, 2021 | Bruiser Strong 2021 | Joppa, MD | 1 | 142 | This was a three-way match, also involving Amber Rodriguez. | |
| 18 | Gia Scott | February 6, 2022 | MCW Winter Blast 2022 - Night 2 | Glen Burnie, MD | 4 | 222 | | |
| 19 | Mandy Leon | September 16, 2022 | MCW Ladies Night 2022 | Joppa, MD | 1 | 104 | This was a Four Corner Survival match, also involving Leila Grey and Melina. | |
| 20 | B3cca | December 30, 2022 | MCW Seasons Beatings 2022 | Joppa, MD | 1 | 57 | This was a Fatal 4-Way elimination match, also involving Gia Scott and Ray Lyn. | |
| 21 | Gia Scott | February 25, 2023 | MCW Winter Blast Tour 2023 Night 2 | Perryville, MD | 5 | 148 | | |
| 22 | Christina Marie | July 23, 2023 | MCW Legacy | Joppa, MD | 1 | 160 | | |
| 23 | Gia Scott | December 30, 2023 | MCW Season's Beatings 2023 - Night 2 | Joppa, MD | 6 | 315 | | |
| 24 | Leila Grey | November 9, 2024 | MCW Autumn Armageddon Tour 2024 - Night 3 | Hollywood, MD | 1 | 1 | | |
| 25 | Gia Scott | November 10, 2024 | MCW Fan Jam | Joppa, MD | 7 | 133 | | |
| 26 | Amara Voyd | March 23, 2025 | MCW Spring Fever Tour 2025 - Night 2 | Dundalk, MD | 1 | 181 | | |
| 27 | Simone Valentina | September 20, 2025 | Bruiser Strong 2025 | Joppa, MD | 1 | 20 | | |
| 28 | Brittany Blake | October 10, 2025 | MCW Autumn Armageddon Tour 2025 - Night 1 | Ridgely, MD | 3 | 23 | | |
| 29 | Simone Valentina | November 2, 2025 | MCW Autumn Armageddon Tour 2025 - Night 6 | Dundalk, MD | 2 | 55 | | |
| 30 | Tina San Antonio | December 27, 2025 | MCW Season's Beatings 2025 | Joppa, MD | 1 | 85 | This was a Winner Takes All Intergender tag team match where Valentina and Jadis Quinn faced San Antonio and Alec Odin, whose | |
| 31 | Simone Valentina | March 22, 2026 | MCW Spring Fever 2026 - Night 5 | Joppa, MD | 3 | 119 | This was a three-way match, also involving Tiara James. | |
| 32 | Gia Scott | July 19, 2026 | MCW 28th Anniversary Show | Dundalk, MD | 8 | 119 | | |
| — | Vacated | November 15, 2026 | — | — | — | — | The championship was vacated after Gia Scott left the company. | |
| 33 | Tiara James | November 15, 2026 | MCW Autumn Armageddon - Night 6 | Joppa, MD | 1 | 1+ | This was a Fatal 4-Way match, also involving Brittany Blake, Tina San Antonio, & Lucky Leone. | |

== Combined reigns ==
As of November 16, 2026.

| Rank | Wrestler | No. of reigns | Combined days |
|---|---|---|---|
| 1 | Gia Scott | 8 | 1,707 |
| 2 | Brittany Blake | 3 | 402 |
| 3 | Melina | 1 | 350 |
| 4 | Amber Rodriguez | 1 | 258 |
| 5 | Renee Michelle | 4 | 251 |
| 6 | Simone Valentina | 3 | 194 |
| 7 | Aria Palmer | 2 | 189 |
| 8 | Amara Voyd | 1 | 181 |
| 9 | Christina Marie | 1 | 160 |
| 10 | Sahara Se7en | 1 | 154 |
| 11 | Mickie James | 1 | 147 |
| 12 | Ray Lyn | 1 | 142 |
| 13 | Mandy Leon | 1 | 104 |
| 14 | Tina San Antonio | 1 | 85 |
| 15 | B3CCA | 1 | 57 |
| 16 | Kimber Lee | 1 | 43 |
| 17 | Tiara James † | 1 | 1+ |
| 18 | Leila Grey | 1 | 1 |
