= Leila Grey =

American professional wrestler

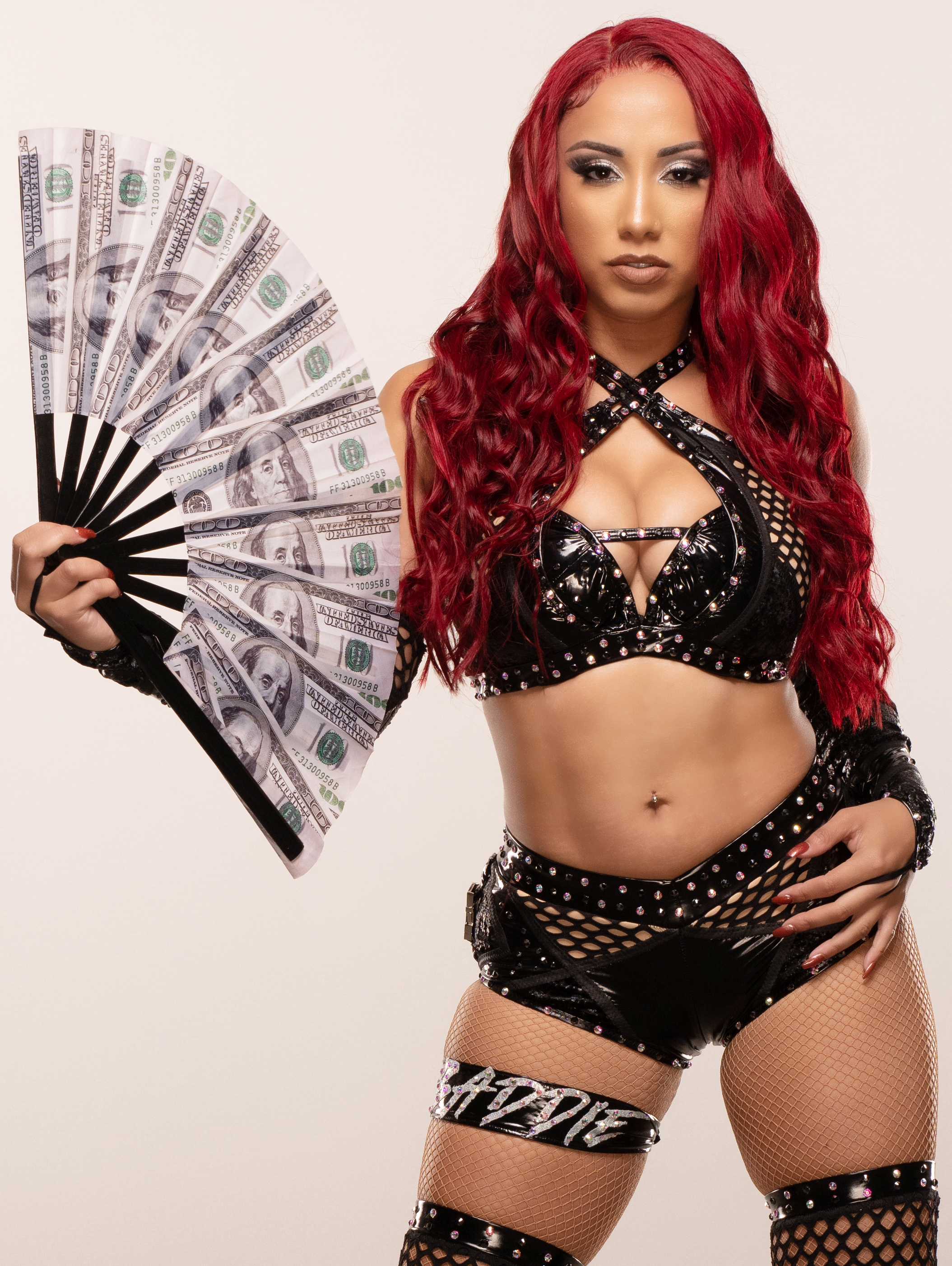
- Grey in 2023

Personal information
- Born: Queens, New York, U.S.

Professional wrestling career
- Ring name(s): Leila Grey; Cat Cardoza
- Billed height: 5 ft 3 in (160 cm)
- Billed weight: 125 lb (57 kg)
- Trained by: JB Cool
- Debut: November 7, 2020

Leila Grey is an American professional wrestler, singer, model and actress. She is signed to All Elite Wrestling (AEW) and Ring of Honor (ROH), where she is a member of Sky Flight and its sub-group Top Flight. She is known for her time in Ohio Valley Wrestling (OVW).

== Professional wrestling career ==
=== Early career (2020–2022) ===
Grey debuted in 2020, wrestling in the independent circuit in Florida.

On June 1, 2021, Grey won her first championship at Pro Wrestling 2.0's live event PW2.0 Genesis, defeating Raeven Marie to win the PW2.0 Women's title. The following year, she won her second championship on December 3, 2022, at the Great Lakes Championship Wrestling live event GLCW Blizzard Brawl: ATTITUDE in a match refereed by ODB, defeating Tiffany Nieves to become the new GLCW Women's Champion.

=== All Elite Wrestling (2021–present) ===
She made her All Elite Wrestling (AEW) debut on March 3, 2021, losing to Tay Conti on AEW Dark. On March 10, she made her AEW Dark: Elevation debut, losing to Diamante. On March 4, 2022, she made her television debut on AEW Rampage, losing to Serena Deeb. On June 29, following a loss to Jade Cargill on AEW Dynamite, Grey turned heel and aligned herself with Cargill, becoming one of The Baddies. The Baddies were quietly disbanded in mid-2023 as Cargill departed the promotion.

In August 2024, Grey was repackaged as the "Flight Attendant" of Top Flight (Darius and Dante Martin, alongside Action Andretti), working as their valet and manager while dressed in air hostess attire. The group appeared together in both Ring of Honor and All Elite Wrestling. In July 2025, Top Flight formed an alliance with Christopher Daniels and Scorpio Sky, known as "SkyFlight". In December 2025, Grey announced that she had suffered a torn ACL during an AEW TBS Championship against Mercedes Moné, rending her out indefinitely.

=== Ohio Valley Wrestling (2022–2024) ===
From 2022 to 2024, Grey worked for Ohio Valley Wrestling. During her time there, she captured the OVW Women's Championship three times.

== Other media ==
In October 2018, Grey appeared in the music video for Bad Bunny's song "Mia", featuring Drake. On October 12, 2024 Grey released her debut single titled "Baddie". She has also previously appeared in the music videos for LunchMoney Lewis's "Make That Cake" featuring Doja Cat and Lil Wayne's "Mama Mia".

As a result of her time in OVW, Grey appeared in the Netflix show Wrestlers in 2023; footage of her wedding was used as part of the show.

== Personal life ==
Grey is originally from Queens, New York, and has a Dominican family background. She has stated that she holds a bachelor's degree in broadcast journalism from Florida International University.

Grey cites Melina, Sasha Banks, and Trish Stratus among her inspirations in wrestling. Grey is married to fellow professional wrestler Luke Kurtis.

== Championships and accomplishments ==
- Great Lakes Championship Wrestling
  - GLCW Women's Championship (1 time, current)
- Maryland Championship Wrestling
  - MCW Women's Championship (1 time)
- Ohio Valley Wrestling
  - OVW Women's Championship (3 times)
  - Impact Opportunity (2022)
  - OVW Women's Title #1 Contendership Gauntlet (2022)
  - Battle Rumble (2024)
  - Women's Nightmare Rumble (2024)
- Pro Wrestling 2.0
  - PW2.0 Women's Championship (1 time)
- Pro Wrestling Illustrated
  - Ranked No. 96 of the top 150 female wrestlers in the PWI Women's 150 in 2022
