= MCW Heavyweight Championship =

Professional wrestling championship

Details
- Promotion: MCW Pro Wrestling
- Date established: October 11, 1998
- Current champion: Brandon Scott
- Date won: September 26, 2026
Statistics
- First champion: Romeo Valentino
- Most reigns: The Bruiser (11 reigns)
- Longest reign: Joseph Keys (450 day)
- Shortest reign: The Bruiser and Drolix (<1 day)

The MCW Heavyweight Championship is a professional wrestling heavyweight championship owned by the MCW Pro Wrestling (MCW) promotion. The title was created and debuted on October 11, 1998, at a MCW live event. In 2003, MCW ceased operations; at its last show MCW Last Dance on July 16, the MCW Heavyweight Championship was unified with the FTW Heavyweight and the MEWF Heavyweight Championships, when then–MCW Heavyweight Champion Danny Doring defeated MEWF Heavyweight Champion Romeo Valentino and self-proclaimed FTW Heavyweight Champion Chris Chetti. MCW reopened in 2005 and held its first show on October 1, 2005, titled Fort Meade Wrestling. The MCW Heavyweight Championship was reinstated on March 26, 2006, at MCW's The Phenomenal Final Four event, where Julio Dinero won a tournament to become the champion.

Title reigns are determined either by professional wrestling matches between wrestlers involved in pre-existing scripted feuds and storylines, or by scripted circumstances. Wrestlers are portrayed as either villains or heroes as they follow a series of tension-building events, which culminate in a wrestling match or series of matches for the championship. Title changes happen at live events, which are usually released on DVD. The inaugural champion was Romeo Valentino, who defeated Corporal Punishment in the finals of a tournament to win the championship on October 11, 1998, at an MCW live event. As of November 2020, The Bruiser holds the record for most reigns, with eleven. Joseph Key's first reign is the longest in the title's history at 450 days. The current champion is Brandon Scott, who is in his first reign. Overall, there have been 62 reigns shared between 36 wrestlers.

== Title history ==
Key
No.	Overall reign number
Reign	Reign number for the specific champion
Days	Number of days held
+	Current reign is changing daily

No.	Champion	Championship change			Reign statistics		Notes	Ref.
No.	Champion	Date	Event	Location	Reign	Days	Notes	Ref.
Maryland Championship Wrestling (MCW)
1	Romeo Valentino	October 11, 1998	Live event	Baltimore, MD	1	53	Valentino defeated Corporal Punishment in a tournament final to become the inaugural champion.	
2	King Kong Bundy	December 3, 1998	Live event	Denton, MD	1	35		
3	Romeo Valentino	January 7, 1999	Live event	Glen Burnie, MD	2	91		
4	Headbanger Mosh	April 8, 1999	Live event	Dundalk, MD	1	70		
5	Tom Brandi	June 17, 1999	Live event	Dundalk, MD	1	80		
6	The Bruiser	September 5, 1999	Live event	Dundalk, MD	1	52		
7	Romeo Valentino	October 27, 1999	Live event	Glen Burnie, MD	3	38		
8	The Bruiser	December 4, 1999	Live event	Sandy Spring, MD	2	228		
9	Jimmy Cicero	July 19, 2000	Live event	Glen Burnie, MD	1	123		
10	Adam Flash	November 19, 2000	Live event	Odenton, MD	1	17		
11	Jimmy Cicero	December 6, 2000	Live event	Glen Burnie, MD	2	163		
12	Adam Flash	May 18, 2001	Live event	Wye Mills, MD	2	168		
13	The Bruiser	November 2, 2001	Live event	Chestertown, MD	3	<1		
14	Jerry Lawler	November 2, 2001	Live event	Chestertown, MD	1	8		
15	The Bruiser	November 10, 2001	Live event	Hampstead, MD	4	91		
16	Orlando Jordan	February 9, 2002	Live event	Lexington, KY	1	7		
17	The Bruiser	February 16, 2002	Live event	Harrington, DE	5	347		
18	Danny Doring	January 29, 2003	Live event	Glen Burnie, MD	1	168		
—	Deactivated	July 16, 2003	Last Dance	Glen Burnie, MD	—	—	Maryland Championship Wrestling (MCW) ceases operations, and the championship is unofficially unified with the FTW Heavyweight and the MEWF Heavyweight Championships after Doring defeated Valentino and Chetti.	
19	Julio Dinero	March 26, 2006	The Phenomenal Final Four	Dundalk, MD	1	105	MCW officially reopened in February 2006. Dinero defeated Genesis in a tournament final to win the newly revived championship.	
20	Adam Flash	July 9, 2006	Live event	Dundalk, MD	3	364		
21	Joey Matthews	July 8, 2007	Shane Shamrock Memorial Cup VII	Dundalk, MD	1	171		
22	Christian York	December 26, 2007	Holiday Homecoming 2007	Glen Burnie, MD	1	423		
23	Ruckus	February 21, 2009	Anniversary 2009	Dundalk, MD	1	258		
24	Kent Brink	November 6, 2009	Live event	Dundalk, MD	1	267		
25	Ryan McBride	July 31, 2010	Shane Shamrock Memorial Cup 2010	Dundalk, MD	1	210		
26	Tyler Hilton	February 26, 2011	Live event	Dundalk, MD	1	82		
27	Cobian	May 19, 2011	Live event	Baltimore, MD	1	134		
28	Ronnie Zukko	September 30, 2011	Live event	Severn, MD	1	91		
29	Tyler Hilton	December 30, 2011	Live event	Dundalk, MD	2	98		
30	Nui Tofiga	April 6, 2012	Live event	Dundalk, MD	1	204		
—	Vacated	October 27, 2012	Live event	Dundalk, MD	—	—	The championship was vacated for undocumented reasons.	
31	Ryan McBride	October 27, 2012	Live event	Dundalk, MD	2	118		
32	Christian York	February 22, 2013	Anniversary	Dundalk, MD	2	435		
33	Drolix	May 3, 2014	Xtreme Measures	Waldorf, MD	1	<1		
34	Matt Hardy	May 3, 2014	Xtreme Measures	Waldorf, MD	1	154		
35	Drolix	October 4, 2014	Tribute to Legends	Waldorf, MD	2	126		
36	The Bruiser	February 7, 2015	Anniversary MMXV	Joppa, MD	6	259		
37	Ryan McBride	October 24, 2015	Autumn Armageddon Tour	Windber, PA	3	336	During this reign Maryland Championship Wrestling was changed to MCW Pro Wrestling.	
MCW Pro Wrestling (MCW)
38	Drolix	September 24, 2016	Tribute to Legends 2016	Joppa, MD	3	126	This was a Dog collar match.	
39	Big Sean Studd	January 28, 2017	Broken Anniversary MMXVII	Joppa, MD	1	245		
40	The Bruiser	September 30, 2017	Tribute to the Legends 2017	Joppa, MD	7	<1	This was a "Stairway to Hell" match.	
41	Joey Matthews	September 30, 2017	Tribute to the Legends 2017	Joppa, MD	2	62		
42	The Bruiser	December 1, 2017	Seasons Beatings 2017	Joppa, MD	8	78	This was a no disqualification match.	
43	Joey Matthews	February 17, 2018	Horsemen Anniversary	Joppa, MD	3	7		
44	The Bruiser	February 24, 2018	Winter Blast 2018	Hollywood, MD	9	28		
45	Joey Matthews	March 24, 2018	Breakthrough: Proving Grounds	Joppa, MD	4	21	This was a steel cage match.	
46	The Bruiser	April 14, 2018	Spring Fever 2018	Hollywood, MD	10	91	This was a steel cage match.	
47	Dante Caballero	July 14, 2018	Shane Shamrock Memorial Cup XVIII - Day 2	Joppa, MD	1	433		
48	Rhett Titus	September 20, 2019	Future of Honor Honor Games	Joppa, MD	1	119	This was an "Honor Games" match, also including Austin Gunn, Brian Johnson, Greg Excellent, Joe Keys and Ken Dixon.	
49	Kekoa	January 17, 2020	Winter Blast 2020	Joppa, MD	1	309	This was a three-way match, also involving Brandon Scott.	
50	The Bruiser	November 21, 2020	Bruiser Strong: Tribute to a Legend	Joppa, MD	11	<1	Given the title by Kekoa as a tribute to his memory.	
—	Vacated	November 21, 2020	Bruiser Strong: Tribute to a Legend	Joppa, MD	—	—	The title was vacated following The Bruiser’s death on November 16, 2020, after a lengthy battle with Leukemia.	
51	Brian Johnson	September 17, 2021	Bruiser Strong 2021	Joppa, MD	1	104	This was a 30-entrant Bruiser Strong Rumble. Johnson was entrant number one, last eliminating Moses.	
52	Ken Dixon	December 30, 2021	MCW Last Call	Joppa, MD	1	254	Dixon won a 4 way match earlier in evening to earn Title Match in NO DQ Main Event against Johnson	
53	Brian Johnson	September 10, 2022	Bruiser Strong 2022	Joppa, MD	2	35	This was an 11-Man Bruiser Strong Rumble. Johnson was entrant number five, last eliminating Action Andretti.	
54	Action Andretti	October 15, 2022	Autumn Armageddon Tour 2022 Night 3	Joppa, MD	1	76		
55	Ken Dixon	December 30, 2022	Season’s Beatings 2022	Joppa, MD	2	35	This was a Fatal 4-Way match, also involving The Mecca and Robert Locke.	
56	Robert Locke	February 3, 2023	MCW Anniversary 2023	Joppa, MD	1	330		
57	Demarcus Kane	December 30, 2023	Seasons Beatings 2023 Night 2	Joppa, MD	1	259	This was a no disqualification match.	
58	Kaun	September 14, 2024	Bruiser Strong 2024	Joppa, MD	1	104	This was an 11-Man Bruiser Strong Rumble. Kaun was entrant number five, last eliminating Joseph Keys.	
59	Joseph Keys	December 27, 2024	Season's Beatings 2024	Joppa, MD	1	450	This was a three-way match, also involving Demarcus Kane.	
60	'Miami' Mike Walker	March 22, 2026	Spring Fever 2026 Night 5	Joppa, MD	1	118	This was a Steel Cage match	
—	Vacated	July 18, 2026	Shane Shamrock Memorial Cup XXV	Joppa, MD	—	—	The championship was vacated by 'Miami' Mike Walker due to medical reasons	
61	Patrick Clark	July 26, 2026	Summer Slamboree - Night 2	Hollywood, MD	1	62	This was a Fatal 4-Way match Steel Cage match also involving Myles Hawkins, Alec Odin, and Ken Dixon.	
62	Brandon Scott	September 26, 2026	Bruiser Strong 2026	Joppa, MD	1	2	This was an 11-Man Bruiser Strong Rumble. Brandon was entrant number ten, last eliminating Patrick Clark.	

== Combined reigns ==
As of September 28, 2026

†	Indicates the current champion

Rank	Wrestler	No. of reigns	Combined days
1	The Bruiser	11	1,174
2	Christian York	2	858
3	Ryan McBride	3	664
4	Adam Flash	3	549
5	Joseph Keys	1	450
6	Dante Caballero	1	433
7	Robert Locke	1	330
8	Kekoa	1	309
9	Ken Dixon	2	289
10	Jimmy Cicero	2	286
11	Kent Brink	1	267
12	Joey Matthews	4	261
13	Demarcus Kane	1	259
14	Ruckus	1	258
15	Drolix	3	252
16	Big Sean Studd	1	245
17	Nui Tofiga	1	204
18	Romeo Valentino	3	182
19	Tyler Hilton	2	180
20	Danny Doring	1	168
21	Matt Hardy	1	154
22	Brian Johnson	2	139
23	Cobian	1	134
24	Rhett Titus	1	119
25	'Miami' Mike Walker	1	118
26	Julio Dinero	1	105
27	Kaun	1	104
28	Ronnie Zukko	1	91
29	Tom Brandi	1	80
30	Action Andretti	1	76
31	Headbanger Mosh	1	70
32	Patrick Clark	1	62
33	King Kong Bundy	1	35
34	Brandon Scott †	1	2+
34	Jerry Lawler	1	8
35	Orlando Jordan	1	7
