= MCW Pro Wrestling =

Independent wrestling promotion

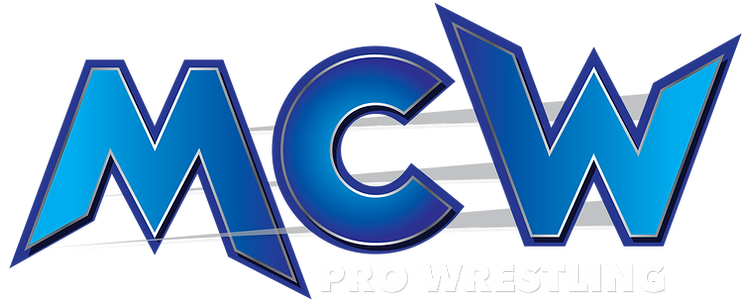
- Acronym: MCW
- Founded: 1998
- Style: Professional wrestling
- Headquarters: Baltimore, Maryland
- Founder(s): Dan McDevitt; Mark Shrader
- Owner(s): Dan McDevitt (1998-2003); Dennis Wipprecht (1998-2003)
- Parent: MSDM, Inc.
- Formerly: Maryland Championship Wrestling
- Website: http://www.mcwprowrestling.com

MCW Pro Wrestling (formerly known as Maryland Championship Wrestling) is a regional independent wrestling promotion based in Joppa, Maryland. It has regularly run events in the Mid-Atlantic region since the late 1990s.

== History ==
Maryland Championship Wrestling (MCW) was originally established by wrestlers Dan McDevitt and Mark Shrader as an extension of the wrestling school Bone Breakers Training Center. MCW held its first card at Baltimore's Patapsco Arena on July 19, 1998, featuring Jerry Lynn, Devon Storm, Little Guido, Balls Mahoney, manager Jim Cornette and The Headbangers. During that event, MCW held a six-man match to crown the first ever Light Heavyweight Champion. The winner of the match was Shane Shamrock and due to his shooting death by police the following month, MCW named him as the lifetime Light Heavyweight Champion and replaced it with the Cruiserweight Championship.

Throughout the next year, the promotion featured veteran wrestlers such as Ricky Steamboat, Ricky Morton, Bobby Eaton, Tito Santana, The Iron Sheik, Sherri Martel, The Road Warriors, King Kong Bundy and Jerry "The King" Lawler, the latter two winning the promotion's heavyweight championship. Longtime mainstays such as Joey Matthews, Jimmy Cicero, Judas Young and Mickie James also began gaining popularity in the promotion.

On March 27, 2002, Steve Wilkos of The Jerry Springer Show made a one night appearance teaming with Gillberg to defeat The Slackers (Chad Bowman and Dino Devine) in a tag team match in Glen Burnie, Maryland; the 1,267 in attendance setting a new record for its home arena Michael's Eighth Avenue ballroom.

After holding its final card, The Last Dance: Shane Shamrock Memorial Cup, on July 16, 2003, MCW announced its intentions to merge with its longtime rival the Mid-Eastern Wrestling Federation. McDevitt and Shrader had originally left Mid-Eastern due to a business dispute with half its roster subsequently leaving for the newly established MCW. Although operations officially ceased in 2003, McDevitt continued holding occasional cards exclusively at Fort Meade under the "Fort Meade Wrestling" banner during the next several years before returning booking regular MCW events again.

MCW made Baltimore headlines in October 2006, with the booking of WIYY morning show personalities Kirk McEwen and Mark Ondayko as part of an eight-man tag match. Participating would have been a breach of their contract with their radio station, however, in the ensuing controversy, the longtime DJs left WIYY for rival WHFS.

On April 22, 2016, it was announced that the promotion was changing its name from Maryland Championship Wrestling to MCW Pro Wrestling.

The company's YouTube Channel is MCW Pro Wrestling.

== Rage TV ==
The promotion also has a syndicated television show, Rage TV, which is also broadcast via the internet. Episodes of Rage TV have also been released on DVD.

In December 2000, local television producer Natasha Small filed a complaint to city officials in Bowie, Maryland in which she claimed she and her daughter had been subject to harassment stemming from a verbal confrontation with Rage TV host Jeff Jones during a television taping at the Bowie Community Television station on October 1, 2002. Although a written response by the city manager's office condemned both parties, no criminal or civil charges were filed against Jones or Maryland Championship Wrestling. Small's claims were supported by former studio director Milly Hall who had previously filed a complaint accusing Jones of using the studio to produce tapes for sale over the internet and what she described as "pornographic-like images" appearing on the show's official website. Maryland Championship Wrestling denied these charges however and, while city officials admitted the possibility of the promotion using the show to "assist a commercial venture", the city notified producers of new policy updates to guard against such assistance.

In April 2011, Rage TV taped shows at Duane "Gillberg" Gill's Professional Wrestling Academy in Severn, Maryland. The show was hosted by country music singer Mark Bray and Gill.

== Shane Shamrock Memorial Cup ==
The Shane Shamrock Memorial Cup is an annual tournament held since 1999. The format of the tournament sees twelve wrestlers competing in six one-on-one matches, with the six winners advancing to an elimination match finale. The tournament is named in honor of Shane Shamrock, the inaugural MCW Light Heavyweight Champion who was shot and killed during an altercation with police officers in 1998.

When MCW closed its doors in 2003, an arrangement was made with Ring of Honor (ROH) that when ROH made its debut in the Baltimore area, it would carry on the tradition of the Shane Shamrock Cup. At Ring of Honor: The Last Stand, it was announced ROH would continue the Shane Shamrock Cup on June 24, 2004. In March, however, Ring of Honor owner Rob Feinstein was forced to step down from his position after being caught in a Perverted-Justice conducted sting operation, allegedly trying to meet an underage boy for sex (no criminal charges were ever filed against Feinstein, as it was not a dual sting operation with law enforcement). Less than a week before the tournament, Feinstein sold his share of ROH to Cary Silkin, causing Maryland promoter Dick Caricofe to pull out of the show. ROH was forced to move the show to Philadelphia and renamed the show Survival of the Fittest.

When MCW reopened in February 2006, it was announced that they were bringing back the Shane Shamrock Cup.

=== Shamrock Cup (2006) ===
MCW held its 6th Shane Shamrock Memorial Cup on July 6, 2006.

No.	Results	Stipulations
1	Derek Frazier defeated Reckless Youth and Alter Boy Luke	Shane Shamrock Memorial Cup 2008 First Round Three-way match match
2	Jerry Lynn defeated Rich Myers (with Earl The Pearl)	Shane Shamrock Memorial Cup First Round match
3	Chris Sabin defeated Alex Shelley	Shane Shamrock Memorial Cup First Round match
4	Steve Anthony defeated Qenaan Creed	Shane Shamrock Memorial Cup First Round match
5	Petey Williams defeated Josh Daniels	Shane Shamrock Memorial Cup First Round match
6	Ruckus defeated Sonjay Dutt	Shane Shamrock Memorial Cup First Round match
7	Adam Flash vs. Corporal Punishment ended in a No Contest	Street Fight
8	Adam Flash defeated Julio Dinero (c) and Jason Static and Scott Fowler (c), and Danny Jaxx, Genesis, and The Bruiser; Adam Flash pinned Dinero to win the MCW Heavyweight Championship	"Ultimate Jeopardy" Six-man tag team match for the MCW Heavyweight Championship and the MCW Tag Team Championship.
9	Ruckus defeated Derek Frazier, Jerry Lynn, Chris Sabin (c), Steve Anthony, and Petey Williams	Six-way elimination match for the Shane Shamrock Memorial Cup and the MCW Cruiserweight Championship
(c) / – the champion(s) heading into the match

Competitor	Eliminated by
Steve Anthony	Chris Sabin
Jerry Lynn	Petey Williams
Petey Williams	Chris Sabin
Chris Sabin	Derek Frazier
Derek Frazier	Ruckus
Ruckus	Winner
(p) – refers to the previous winner heading into the match

=== Shamrock Cup (2007) ===
MCW held its 7th Shane Shamrock Memorial Cup on July 8, 2007.

No.	Results	Stipulations
1	Christopher Daniels defeated Jay Lethal	Shane Shamrock Memorial Cup First Round match
2	Josh Daniels defeated Derek Frazier	Shane Shamrock Memorial Cup First Round match
3	Delirious defeated Christian York	Shane Shamrock Memorial Cup First Round match
4	Human Tornado defeated Azrieal	Shane Shamrock Memorial Cup First Round match
5	Sonjay Dutt defeated Eddie Edwards	Shane Shamrock Memorial Cup First Round match
6	Adam Flash (c) vs. Danny Doring ended in a no contest	Singles match for the MCW Heavyweight Championship
7	Joey Matthews defeated Adam Flash (c)	Singles match for the MCW Heavyweight Championship
8	Pat Brink defeated The Bruiser	No Holds Barred match
9	Creative Control (Jimmy Cicero and Tom Brandi) won by last eliminating Qenaan Creed	Tag TeamBattle Royal for a MCW Tag Team Championship match
10	Josh Daniels defeated Human Tornado, Sonjay Dutt, Delirious, Christopher Daniels, and Ruckus	Six-way elimination match for the Shane Shamrock Memorial Cup
(c) / – the champion(s) heading into the match

Competitor	Eliminated by
Delirious	Josh Daniels
Sonjay Dutt	Christopher Daniels
Human Tornado	Ruckus
Ruckus (p)	Christopher Daniels
Christopher Daniels	Josh Daniels
Josh Daniels	Winner
(p) – refers to the previous winner heading into the match

=== Shamrock Cup (2008) ===
MCW held its 8th annual Shane Shamrock Memorial Cup (branded as "Shamrock VIII") on July 18 and 19, 2008.

Day 1

No.	Results	Stipulations
1	Claudio Castagnoli defeated Delirious	Shane Shamrock Memorial Cup 2008 First Round match
2	The S.A.T. (Jose and Joel Maximo) vs. Team Macktion (Kirby Mack and TJ Mack) ended in a Double Countout	Shane Shamrock Memorial Cup 2008 First Round tag team match
3	Rhett Titus defeated Pelle Primeau and Mitch Franklin	Shane Shamrock Memorial Cup 2008 First Round Three-way match match
4	Devon Storm defeated Devon Moore	Shane Shamrock Memorial Cup 2008 First Round match
5	Balls Mahoney and Danny Doring (with Tammy Sytch) defeated The Bruiser and D. J. Hyde	No Disqualification tag team match
6	The Holy Rollers (Jimmy Jannetty and Ramblin' Rich (with Earl The Pearl)) defeated Adam Carelle and Wes Mercer	Tag team match
7	Christian York (c) (with Kimberly McDevitt) defeated Adam Flash 2-0	Two-out-of-three-falls match for the MCW Heavyweight Championship: Fall 1: Last Man Standing match (won by York); Fall 2: "I Quit" match (won by York)
8	Josh Daniels (c) defeated Champ Champagne (with Bobby Starr)	Singles match for the MCW Cruiserweight Championship
9	Joey Matthews (with Kimberly McDevitt) defeated Ruckus (with Chrissy Rivera)	Shane Shamrock Memorial Cup 2008 First Round match
10	The Ghetto Mafia (2-Dope and Qenaan Creed) (c) defeated Ryan McBride and Teddy Stigma (with Angela)	Tag Team Ladder match for the MCW Tag Team Championship
(c) / – the champion(s) heading into the match

Day 2

No.	Results	Stipulations
1	Derek Frazier defeated Pelle Primeau, Devon Moore, and Ruckus (with Chrissy Rivera)	Shane Shamrock Memorial Cup 2008 Last Chance Four Way Match
2	The Rehoboth Beach Crew (Tyler Hilton and Zachary Shane (with Tara)) defeated The Rehoboth Beach Crew (Joseph Brooks and Link Kory (with Noel))	Tag team match
3	Mitch Franklin defeated Champ Champagne (with Bobby Starr)	Singles match
4	The Best Around (Bruce Maxwell and TJ Cannon) (with Dino Divine) defeated Ryan McBride and Teddy Stigma (with Angela)	Tag team match
5	The Bruiser defeated Danny Doring	Loser Leaves Town Match
6	The Ghetto Mafia (2-Dope and Qenaan Creed) (c) defeated Adam Flash and Corporal Punishment	Tag Team No Disqualification Falls Count Anywhere match for the MCW Tag Team Championship
7	Christian York (c) (with Kimberly McDevitt and Cobian) defeated Delirious	Singles match for the MCW Heavyweight Championship
8	Christian York (c) (with Kimberly McDevitt and Cobian) vs. Ruckus (with Chrissy Rivera) ended in a no contest	Singles match for the MCW Heavyweight Championship
9	Derek Frazier defeated Rhett Titus, Claudio Castagnoli, Devon Storm, Joey Matthews, and Josh Daniels	Six-way elimination match for the 2008 Shane Shamrock Memorial Cup with Bill Alfonso as the special guest referee
(c) / – the champion(s) heading into the match

Competitor	Eliminated by
Rhett Titus	Derek Frazier
Devon Storm	Joey Matthews
Josh Daniels (p)	Derek Frazier
Claudio Castagnoli	Joey Matthews
Joey Matthews	Derek Frazier
Derek Frazier	Winner
(p) – refers to the previous winner heading into the match

=== Shamrock Cup (2009) ===
MCW held its 9th annual Shane Shamrock Memorial Cup (branded as "MCW Shamrock Cup 9") on July 11, 2009.

No.	Results	Stipulations
1	Team Macktion (Kirby Mack and TJ Mack) defeated Ryan McBride and Teddy Stigma	Shane Shamrock Memorial Cup First Round tag team match
2	Cobian defeated The Bruiser	Singles match
3	Privileged (Tyler Hilton and Zachary Shane) defeated Stevie Richards and Sugarmask, Cole Calloway and Rhett Titus, and Dino Divine and D. J. Hyde (c)	Four Corners tag team match for the MCW Tag Team Championship
4	Aden Chambers defeated Ray Alexander	Shane Shamrock Memorial Cup First Round match
5	Qenaan Creed defeated Cloudy	Shane Shamrock Memorial Cup First Round match
6	Adam Carelle defeated The American Marvel	Shane Shamrock Memorial Cup First Round match
7	Kenny Dykstra defeated Cheech	Shane Shamrock Memorial Cup First Round match
8	Ryan McBride defeated Teddy Stigma	Shane Shamrock Memorial Cup First Round Wildcard match
9	Daffney defeated Roxie Cotton	Singles match
10	Jake Manning defeated Caleb Konley	Singles match
11	Ruckus (c) defeated Christian York and Josh Daniels	Three-way match for the MCW Heavyweight Championship
12	Ryan McBride defeated Aden Chambers, Kirby Mack, Qenaan Creed, Kenny Dykstra, and Adam Carelle	Six-way elimination match for the Shane Shamrock Memorial Cup
(c) / – the champion(s) heading into the match

Competitor	Eliminated by
Aden Chambers	Ryan McBride
Kenny Dykstra	Adam Carelle
Adam Carelle	Qenaan Creed
Qenaan Creed	Kirby Mack
Kirby Mack	Ryan McBride
Ryan McBride	Winner
(p) – refers to the previous winner heading into the match

=== Shamrock Cup X (2010) ===
MCW held its 10th annual Shane Shamrock Memorial Cup (branded as "MCW Shamrock Cup X") on July 31, 2010.

No.	Results	Stipulations
1	Ryan McBride defeated Patrick Brink (c)	Singles match for the MCW Heavyweight Championship
2	Rich Swann defeated Ruckus	Shane Shamrock Memorial Cup First Round match
3	Sami Callihan defeated Scott Reed	Shane Shamrock Memorial Cup First Round match
4	Teddy Stigma defeated Joe Ettel	Shane Shamrock Memorial Cup First Round match
5	Tommaso Ciampa defeated Bobby Shields	Shane Shamrock Memorial Cup First Round match
6	Christian York and Joel Maximo defeated The Best Around (Bruce Maxwell and TJ Cannon)	Shane Shamrock Memorial Cup First Round tag team match
7	Kevin Eck, Ronnie Zukko, and Cole Calloway defeated Fed Up (C-Fed and G-Fed) and Peter Schmuck	Six-man tag team match
8	The Holy Rollers (Earl The Pearl and Rich Myers) defeated Team MackTion (Kirby Mack and T.J. Mack) (c), CA Elliott and Nui Tofiga and The Hit Squad (Drolix and Kindred)	four-way Tag team match for the MCW Tag Team Championship
9	Cobian and Tommy Dreamer defeated Adam Cole (c) and Tyler Hilton	Hardcore tag team match for the MCW Rage Television Championship
10	Mickie James defeated Mia Yim	Singles match
11	Christian York defeated Tommaso Ciampa, Teddy Stigma, Sami Callihan, Rich Swann, and Ryan McBride	Six-man elimination match for the Shane Shamrock Memorial Cup
(c) / – the champion(s) heading into the match

Competitor	Eliminated by
Sami Callihan	Rich Swann
Rich Swann	Tommaso Ciampa
Tommaso Ciampa	Christian York
Teddy Stigma	Ryan McBride
Ryan McBride (p)	Christian York
Christian York	Winner
(p) – refers to the previous winner heading into the match

=== Shamrock Cup XI (2011) ===
MCW held its 11th annual Shane Shamrock Memorial Cup (branded as "MCW Shamrock Cup XI") on July 30, 2011.

No.	Results	Stipulations
1	Alex Colon defeated Corey Hollis and Judas Young	Shane Shamrock Memorial Cup XI First Round Triple threat match
2	Vordell Walker defeated Kyle Matthews and Nathan Crown	Shane Shamrock Memorial Cup XI First Round Triple threat match
3	Ronnie Zukko (c) defeated Nui Tofiga by Count Out	Singles match for the MCW Rage TV Championship
4	Ricky Reyes defeated Aiden Chambers and Mike Posey	Shane Shamrock Memorial Cup XII First Round Triple threat match
5	Josh Daniels defeated Oliver Grimsly and Alexander James	Shane Shamrock Memorial Cup XII First Round Triple threat match
6	Napalm Bomb won by last eliminating Mustafa Aziz Daniels	Battle Royal for a MCW Rage TV Championship match
7	Fed Up (C-Fed and G-Fed) defeated The Holy Rollers (Earl The Pearl and Rich Meyers) (c)	Tag team match for the MCW Tag Team Championship
8	Cobian (c) defeated The Bruiser	Singles match for the MCW Heavyweight Championship
9	Sami Callihan defeated Vordell Walker, Ricky Reyes, Josh Daniels, Alex Colon, and Kirby Mack	Six-way elimination match for the Shane Shamrock Memorial Cup
(c) / – the champion(s) heading into the match

Competitor	Eliminated by
Vordell Walker	Sami Callihan
Alex Colon	Kirby Mack
Kirby Mack	Sami Callihan
Ricky Reyes	Josh Daniels
Josh Daniels	Sami Callihan
Sami Callihan	Winner
(p) – refers to the previous winner heading into the match

=== Shamrock Cup XII (2012) ===
MCW held its 12th annual Shane Shamrock Memorial Cup (branded as "MCW Shamrock Cup XII") on July 7, 2012.

No.	Results	Stipulations
1	Josh Daniels defeated Shawn Patrick	Shane Shamrock Memorial Cup XII First Round match
2	Delirious defeated Alexander James	Shane Shamrock Memorial Cup XII First Round match
3	Adam Cole defeated Oliver Grimsly	Shane Shamrock Memorial Cup XII First Round match
4	Ricky Reyes defeated Ben Dejo and Marty con Dejo	Shane Shamrock Memorial Cup XII First Round Triple threat match
5	Ruckus defeated Derek Frazier	Shane Shamrock Memorial Cup XII First Round match
6	Fed Up (C-Fed and G-Fed) (c) defeated Hoss Hagood and Mustafa Aziz Daniels, Black Wallstreet (Chuck Lennox and Prolix), The Ghetto Mafia (2-Dope and Qenaan Creed), Buck Chyld and Napalm Bomb, and The Holy Rollers (Earl The Pearl and Ramblin' Rich)	Gauntlet match for the MCW Tag Team Championship
7	Nui Tofiga (c) defeated Christian York	Singles match for the MCW Heavyweight Championship
8	Tyler Hilton and Matt Hardy defeated Adam Flash and Ronnie Zukko	Tag team match
9	Adam Cole defeated Josh Daniels, Delirious, Ricky Reyes, Ruckus, Sami Callihan	Six-way elimination match for the Shane Shamrock Memorial Cup
(c) / – the champion(s) heading into the match

Competitor	Eliminated by
Delirious	Josh Daniels
Ruckus	Josh Daniels
Josh Daniels	Ricky Reyes
Ricky Reyes	Adam Cole
Sami Callihan (p)	Adam Cole
Adam Cole	Winner
(p) – refers to the previous winner heading into the match

=== Shane Shamrock Cup (2013) ===
The 13th MCW Shane Shamrock Cup was held on August 10, 2013.

No.	Results	Stipulations
1	Derek Frazier and Ruckus defeated The Unleashed (Dezmond Xavier and Fenix Fury)	Shane Shamrock Memorial Cup First Round tag team match
2	Drolix defeated Alexander James	Shane Shamrock Memorial Cup First Round match
3	Papadon defeated Oliver Grimsly	Shane Shamrock Memorial Cup First Round match
4	Luke Hawx defeated Lance Anoai	Shane Shamrock Memorial Cup First Round match
5	Mike Mondo defeated Shawn Patrick	Shane Shamrock Memorial Cup First Round match
6	Buck Chyld and G-Fed defeated The New Age Scumbags (Adam Flash and Ronnie Zukko) (c), Mitch Miller and Paul White, 2-Dope and Napalm Bomb, The Hell Cats (Jimmy Starz and Sexy Steve), Hoss Hagood, and Chuck Lennox and Solo	Gauntlet match for the MCW Tag Team Championship
7	Cobian vs. Nui Tofiga ended in a double countout	Singles match
8	Jessie Kaye and Veda Scott defeated Amber Rodriguez and Renee Michelle	Tag team match
9	Christian York (c) defeated C-Fed	Singles match for the MCW Heavyweight Championship
10	Luke Hawx defeated Adam Cole, Derek Frazier, Drolix, Papadon and Mike Mondo	Six-way elimination match for the Shane Shamrock Memorial Cup
(c) / – the champion(s) heading into the match

Competitor	Eliminated by
Mike Mondo	Papadon
Papadon	Derek Frazier
Derek Frazier	Drolix
Drolix	Adam Cole
Adam Cole (p)	Luke Hawx
Luke Hawx	Winner
(p) – refers to the previous winner heading into the match

=== Shane Shamrock Memorial Cup (2014) ===
The 14th Shane Shamrock Memorial Cup was held on July 19, 2014, in Joppa, Maryland.

No.	Results	Stipulations
1	Shane Strickland defeated Fenix Fury	Shane Shamrock Memorial Cup First Round match
2	Bo Nekoda defeated Brandon Scott	Shane Shamrock Memorial Cup First Round match
3	Papadon defeated Tony Nese	Shane Shamrock Memorial Cup First Round match
4	Drolix defeated Shaun Cannon	Shane Shamrock Memorial Cup First Round match
5	Rush Hour (Bolt Brady and Bu Ku Dao) defeated Los Ben Dejos (Jay Cruz and Jay Rios)	Shane Shamrock Memorial Cup First Round tag team match
6	Black Wall Street (Napalm Bomb and Solo) (c) defeated Adam Flash and Ronnie Zukko	Tag team match for the MCW Tag Team Championship
7	The Bruiser defeated Chuck Lennox	Singles match
8	Brother Devon, Buck Chyld, and G-Fed defeated The Hell Cats (Jimmy Starz and Sexy Steve) and Ryan McBride	Six-man tag team match
9	Reby Sky defeated Shelley Martinez	Singles match
10	Drolix defeated Bo Nekoda, Bolt Brady, Bu Ku Dao, Papadon and Shane Strickland	Six-way elimination match for the 2014 Shane Shamrock Memorial Cup
11	Matt Hardy (c) defeated Luke Hawx (c)	Tables, Ladders, and Chairs match for Hardy's MCW Heavyweight Championship and Hawx's Extreme Rising Championship
(c) / – the champion(s) heading into the match

Competitor	Eliminated by
Bo Nekoda	Bu Ku Dao
Bolt Brady	Papadon
Papadon	Shane Strickland
Shane Strickland	Bu Ku Dao
Bu Ku Dao	Drolix
Drolix	Winner

=== Shane Shamrock Memorial Cup XV (2015) ===
The 15th annual Shane Shamrock Memorial Cup took place on July 18, 2015, at the MCW Arena in Joppa, Maryland.

No.	Results	Stipulations
1	Shane Strickland defeated Eddie Smooth	Shane Shamrock Memorial Cup 2015 First Round match
2	Lio Rush defeated Kai Katana	Shane Shamrock Memorial Cup 2015 First Round match
3	Brandon Scott defeated Chuck Lennox	Shane Shamrock Memorial Cup 2015 First Round match
4	Matt Cross defeated Bo Nekoda	Shane Shamrock Memorial Cup 2015 First Round match
5	Eddie Edwards and Fenix Fury defeated The Punk Rock All Stars (Drake Carter and Shaun Cannon)	Shane Shamrock Memorial Cup 2015 First Round tag team match (Winner of the Fall advances)
6	Madison Rayne and Veda Scott defeated Amber Rodriguez and Kimber Lee	Tag team match; Velvet Sky was special guest referee
7	The Ecktourage (Dirty Money and Eric Chapel) defeated The Hell Cats (Jimmy Starz and Sexy Steve) (c), Black Wall Street (Napalm Bomb and Solo), and Fed Up (C-Fed and G-Fed)	Four Corners tag team match for the MCW Tag Team Championship
8	The Bruiser (c) defeated Ryan McBride	No-Countout, No disqualification match for the MCW Heavyweight Championship
9	Lio Rush defeated Brandon Scott, Drolix, Eddie Edwards, Matt Cross and Shane Strickland	Six-way elimination match for the Shane Shamrock Memorial Cup
(c) / – the champion(s) heading into the match

Competitor	Eliminated by
Eddie Edwards	Shane Strickland
Brandon Scott	Drolix
Matt Cross	Lio Rush
Drolix (p)	Shane Strickland
Shane Strickland	Lio Rush
Lio Rush	Winner
(p) – refers to the previous winner heading into the match

=== Shane Shamrock Memorial Cup XVI (2016) ===
The 16th annual Shane Shamrock Memorial Cup took place on July 16, 2016, at the MCW Arena in Joppa, Maryland.

No.	Results	Stipulations
1	Sonjay Dutt defeated Chuck Lennox	Shane Shamrock Memorial Cup 2016 First Round match
2	Travis Gordon defeated Facade and Leon St. Giovanni	Shane Shamrock Memorial Cup 2016 First Round three-way match
3	The Dixon Line (Robert Locke and Joe Keys) defeated Brandon Scott and Sean Carr	Shane Shamrock Memorial Cup 2016 First Round tag team match (Winner of the Fall advances)
4	Tommaso Ciampa defeated Jason Kincaid	Shane Shamrock Memorial Cup 2016 First Round match
5	Jason Kincaid defeated Brandon Scott, Chuck Lennox, Facade, Leon St. Giovann, Robert Locke and Sean Carr	Shane Shamrock Memorial Cup 2016 Last Chance Battle royal
6	F.U. (Chris Swann and George Jenkins) defeated The Hell Cats (Jimmy Starz and Sexy Steve)	Unsanctioned Street Fight
7	Ecktourge (Dirty Money and Eric Chapel) defeated Punk Rock All-Stars (c) (Shaun Cannon and Drake Carter), Black Wallstreet (Napalm Bomb and Solo), The Bruiser and Rayo, Cousin Clay and Bo Nekoda and Guns 4 Hire (Paul Jordane and Bill Collier)	MCW Tag Team Championship Gauntlet match
8	Brittany Blake (c) defeated Kennadi Brink	Singles match for the MCW Women's Championship
9	King McBride (c) defeated Drolix	Singles match for the MCW Heavyweight Championship
10	Lio Rush defeated Jason Kincaid, Joe Keys, Sonjay Dutt, Travis Gordon and Tommaso Ciampa	Six-way elimination match for the 2016 Shane Shamrock Memorial Cup
(c) / – the champion(s) heading into the match

Competitor	Eliminated by
Joe Keys	Jason Kincaid
Sonjay Dutt	Travis Gordon
Jason Kincaid	Lio Rush
Travis Gordon	Tommaso Ciampa
Tommaso Ciampa	Lio Rush
Lio Rush (p)	Winner
(p) – refers to the previous winner heading into the match

=== Shane Shamrock Memorial Cup XVII (2017) ===
The 17th annual Shane Shamrock Memorial Cup took place on July 14 and 15, 2017 at the MCW Arena in Joppa, Maryland.

Day 1

No.	Results	Stipulations
1	Brandon Scott defeated Anthony Bowens, Lor Diaz and Matt Macintosh	Shane Shamrock Memorial Cup 2017 First Round four-way match
2	Lio Rush defeated Ken Dixon	Singles match
3	Joey Janela defeated Maxwell Jacob Friedman	Shane Shamrock Memorial Cup 2017 First Round match
4	Greg Excellent defeated Dante Cabellero (c) by disqualification	Singles match for the MCW Rage TV Championship
5	Shaheem Ali defeated Leon St. Giovanni	Shane Shamrock Memorial Cup 2017 First Round match
6	Joey Matthews defeated Joe Keys	Shane Shamrock Memorial Cup 2017 First Round match
7	Anthony Henry vs. Josh Woods ended in a time limit draw	Shane Shamrock Memorial Cup 2017 First Round match
8	The Rock 'n' Roll Express (Robert Gibson and Ricky Morton) defeated The Appalachian Outlaws (Bo Nekoda and Hoss Hagood)	Tag team match
9	Marcellus Prime defeated Sean Studd (c) by disqualification	Singles match for the MCW Heavyweight Championship; The Bruiser and Napalm Bomb were Special Guest Enforcers
(c) / – the champion(s) heading into the match

Day 2

No.	Results	Stipulations
1	Leon St. Giovanni defeated Joe Keys	Singles match
2	The Winner's Circle (Jeremiah and Rayo) defeated The Hell Cats (Jimmy Starz and Sexy Steve)	Tag team match
3	Anthony Henry defeated Chuck Lennox, Elia, Hoss Hagood, Josh Woods, Kai Katana, Leon St. Giovanni, Lor Diaz, Punk Rock All-Stars (Shaun Cannon and Drake Carter) and Shaun Moore	Shane Shamrock Memorial Cup 2016 Last Chance Battle royal
4	Anthony Bowens defeated Matt Macintosh	Singles match
5	Maxwell Jacob Friedman defeated Dante Cabellero (c) and Greg Excellent	Three-way match for the MCW Rage TV Championship
6	The Bruiser and Marcellus Prime defeated Napalm Bomb and Sean Studd	No-Countout, No disqualification tag team match
7	Ryan McBride defeated Ken Dixon	Singles match
8	Guns 4 Hire (Bill Collier and Paul Jordane) (c) defeated Ecktourge (Dirty Money and Eric Chapel)	Tag team match for the MCW Tag Team Championship
9	Joey Matthews defeated Anthony Henry, Brandon Scott, Joey Janela, Lio Rush and Shaheem Ali	Six-way elimination match for the 2017 Shane Shamrock Memorial Cup
(c) / – the champion(s) heading into the match

Competitor	Eliminated by
Shaheem Ali	Joey Matthews
Brandon Scott	Lio Rush
Anthony Henry	Joey Janela
Joey Janela	Lio Rush
Lio Rush (p)	Joey Matthews
Joey Matthews	Winner
(p) – refers to the previous winner heading into the match

=== Shane Shamrock Memorial Cup XVIII (2018) ===
The 18th annual Shane Shamrock Memorial Cup took place on July 13 and 14, 2018 at the MCW Arena in Joppa, Maryland.

Day 1

No.	Results	Stipulations
1	Anthony Henry defeated Joe Keys	Shane Shamrock Memorial Cup 2018 First Round match
2	Brandon Scott defeated Ken Dixon	Shane Shamrock Memorial Cup 2018 First Round match
3	Dante Caballero defeated Joe Gacy	Shane Shamrock Memorial Cup 2018 First Round match
4	Ryan McBride defeated Greg Excellent (c)	Singles match for the MCW Rage TV Championship
5	2 Cold Scorpio defeated Drew Alder	Shane Shamrock Memorial Cup 2018 First Round match
6	John Skyler defeated Rayo	Shane Shamrock Memorial Cup 2018 First Round match
7	James Drake vs. Kekoa ended in a draw	Shane Shamrock Memorial Cup 2018 First Round match
8	Joe Keys defeated Drew Alder, James Drake, Joe Gacy, Kekoa, Ken Dixon and Rayo	Shane Shamrock Memorial Cup 2018 Last Chance Battle Royal
9	The Bruiser (c) defeated The Cartel (Dante Caballero and Joe Keys)	Handicap match for the MCW Heavyweight Championship
(c) / – the champion(s) heading into the match

Day 2

No.	Results	Stipulations
1	Tehuti Miles defeated Dirty Money	Singles match
2	Bishop Khan and Malcolm Moses defeated The Hell Cats (Jimmy Starz and Sexy Steve)	Tag team match
3	Rosa Mendes defeated Robyn Reid	Singles match to determine the #1 contender for the MCW Women's Championship
4	Bobby and Robby defeated The Cartel (Dante Caballero and Joey Keys) (c)	Tag team match for the MCW Tag Team Championship
5	The Bruiser (c) defeated Christian York	Street Fight for the MCW Heavyweight Championship
6	Dante Caballero defeated The Bruiser (c)	Singles match for the MCW Heavyweight Championship
7	Greg Excellent and Momma Excellent defeated Andy Vineberg and Ryan McBride	Tag team match
8	Joe Gacy defeated James Drake and Rayo	Three-way match
9	Ken Dixon defeated Drolix	Singles match
10	Joe Keys defeated 2 Cold Scorpio, Anthony Henry, Brandon Scott, Dante Caballero and John Skyler	Six-way elimination match for the 2018 Shane Shamrock Memorial Cup
(c) / – the champion(s) heading into the match

Competitor	Eliminated by
Anthony Henry	2 Cold Scorpio
John Skyler	Brandon Scott
2 Cold Scorpio	Joe Keys
Dante Caballero	Joe Keys
Brandon Scott	Joe Keys
Joe Keys	Winner
(p) – refers to the previous winner heading into the match

=== Shane Shamrock Memorial Cup XIX (2019) ===
The 19th annual Shane Shamrock Memorial Cup took place on July 13, 2019, at the MCW Arena in Joppa, Maryland.

No.	Results	Stipulations
1	Brandon Scott defeated Ryan McBride	Kendo Stick match, Winner advances to a Shane Shamrock Memorial Cup 2019 First Round match
2	Anthony Gangone defeated Jimmy Lloyd	Shane Shamrock Memorial Cup 2019 First Round match
3	Will Ferrara defeated Greg Excellent	Shane Shamrock Memorial Cup 2019 First Round match
4	Kekoa defeated Brian Johnson	Shane Shamrock Memorial Cup 2019 First Round match
5	VSK defeated Scarlett Bordeaux	Shane Shamrock Memorial Cup 2019 First Round match
6	Brandon Scott and Crowbar defeated Tracer X and Ken Broadway	Shane Shamrock Memorial Cup 2019 First Round Tag Team match
7	The Saviors (Eric Martin and John Skyler) defeated Bobby and Robby	Tag team match for the vacant MCW Tag Team Championship
8	Dante Caballero (c) defeated Drolix	Unsanctioned match for the MCW Heavyweight Championship
9	Nick Aldis (c) defeated Dirty Money	Singles match for the NWA Worlds Heavyweight Championship
10	Brandon Scott defeated Anthony Gangone, Will Ferrara, Kekoa, VSK, and Joe Keys	Six-way elimination match for the 2018 Shane Shamrock Memorial Cup
(c) / – the champion(s) heading into the match

Competitor	Eliminated by
Anthony Gangone	Will Ferrara
Joe Keys (p)	VSK
VSK	Kekoa
Will Ferrara	Brandon Scott
Kekoa	Brandon Scott
Brandon Scott	Winner
(p) – refers to the previous winner heading into the match

=== Shane Shamrock Memorial Cup XX (2021) ===
The 20th annual Shane Shamrock Memorial Cup took place on November 12, 2021, at the MCW Arena in Joppa, Maryland.

No.	Results	Stipulations
1	Action Andretti defeated Jake Crist	Shane Shamrock Memorial Cup XX First Round match
2	PJ Hawx defeated Myles Hawkins and Rayo	Shane Shamrock Memorial Cup XX First Round Triple threat match
3	Ninja Mack defeated Sam Adonis	Shane Shamrock Memorial Cup XX First Round match
4	KC Novarro defeated Luke Hawx	Shane Shamrock Memorial Cup XX First Round match
5	Shannon Moore defeated Aaron Rourke	Shane Shamrock Memorial Cup XX First Round match
6	Ray Lyn (c) defeated Megan Bayne	Singles match for the MCW Women's Championship
7	Black Wallstreet (Drolix and Chuck Lennox) defeated Ken Dixon and Boom Hayden, and Seduce and Destroy (Joe Keys and Breaux Keller) (c)	Three-way tag team match for the MCW Tag Team Championship
8	Brian Johnson (c) vs. Moses ended in a no contest	Singles match for the MCW Heavyweight Championship
9	Action Andretti defeated PJ Hawx, Ninja Mack, KC Novarro, Shannon Moore, and Brandon Scott	Six-way elimination match for the Shane Shamrock Memorial Cup
(c) / – the champion(s) heading into the match

Competitor	Eliminated by
Brandon Scott (p)	Shannon Moore
KC Novarro	PJ Hawx
Shannon Moore	PJ Hawx
PJ Hawx	Ninja Mack
Ninja Mack	Action Andretti
Action Andretti	Winner
(p) – refers to the previous winner heading into the match

=== Shane Shamrock Memorial Cup XXI (2022) ===
The 21st annual Shane Shamrock Memorial Cup took place on July 23, 2022, at the RJ Meyer Arena in Joppa, Maryland.

No.	Results	Stipulations
1	Rich Swann defeated Myles Hawkins	Shane Shamrock Memorial Cup XXI First Round match
2	Jack Evans defeated Breaux Keller	Shane Shamrock Memorial Cup XXI First Round match
3	Flip Gordon defeated 'Miami' Mike Walker	Shane Shamrock Memorial Cup XXI First Round match
4	Brandon Scott defeated Killian McMurphy	Shane Shamrock Memorial Cup XXI First Round match
5	Ken Dixon (c) defeated Kekoa	Singles match for the MCW Heavyweight Championship
6	The Trade (Robert Locke and Eric Martin) defeated Alec Odin and Samuel Shaw (c)	Tag team match for the MCW Tag Team Championship
7	Tim Spriggs defeated Alex Divine	Singles match
8	Mandy Leon and Moses defeated Gia Scott and Demarcus Kane	Mixed tag team match
9	Flip Gordon defeated Joey Janela, Jack Evans, Brandon Scott, Rich Swann, and Action Andretti	Six-way elimination match for the Shane Shamrock Memorial Cup
(c) / – the champion(s) heading into the match

Competitor	Eliminated by
Jack Evans	Joey Janela
Joey Janela	Action Andretti
Action Andretti (p)	Brandon Scott
Brandon Scott	Rich Swann
Rich Swann	Flip Gordon
Flip Gordon	Winner
(p) – refers to the previous winner heading into the match

=== Shane Shamrock Memorial Cup XXII (2023) ===
The 22nd annual Shane Shamrock Memorial Cup took place on July 22, 2023, at the RJ Meyer Arena in Joppa, Maryland.

No.	Results	Stipulations
1	Lio Rush defeated Myles Hawkins	Shane Shamrock Memorial Cup XXII First Round match
2	Marcus Mathers defeated Techno	Shane Shamrock Memorial Cup XXII First Round match
3	Kekoa defeated 'Miami' Mike Walker and Alex Divine †	Shane Shamrock Memorial Cup XXII First Round Triple threat match
4	Mike Bailey defeated Jordan Oliver	Shane Shamrock Memorial Cup XXII First Round match
5	Jack Cartwheel defeated Carlie Bravo	Shane Shamrock Memorial Cup XXII First Round match
6	Brittany Blake, Kaia McKenna, and Gia Scott defeated Simone Valentina, Hailey J, Tiffany Nieves	Six-Woman Tag Team Match with Mickie James as the special guest referee
7	Capital Punishment (Tim Spriggs and Spencer Slade) defeated Dante Caballero and Joe Keys (c)	Tag team match for the MCW Tag Team Championship
8	Robert Locke (c) defeated Ken Dixon	No Disqualification Match for the MCW Heavyweight Championship with Van Hammer as the Special Guest Enforcer
9	'Miami' Mike Walker defeated Marcus Mathers, Kekoa, Mike Bailey, Jack Cartwheel, and Flip Gordon	Six-way elimination match for the Shane Shamrock Memorial Cup
(c) / – the champion(s) heading into the match

† Lio Rush suffered an injury which forced him to withdraw. Therefore, in the Triple Threat match, whomever was NOT pinned would also advance to the finals.

Competitor	Eliminated by
Jack Cartwheel	Kekoa
Marcus Mathers	Flip Gordon
Kekoa	Flip Gordon
Flip Gordon (p)	Mike Bailey
Mike Bailey	’Miami’ Mike Walker
’Miami’ Mike Walker	Winner
(p) – refers to the previous winner heading into the match

=== Shane Shamrock Memorial Cup XXIII (2024) ===
The 23rd annual Shane Shamrock Memorial Cup took place on July 13, 2024, at the RJ Meyer Arena in Joppa, Maryland.

No.	Results	Stipulations
1	The Hype (Khazman Lee and Myron Malone) defeated Capital Punishment (Tim Spriggs and Spencer Slade) (c)	Tag Team Match for the MCW Tag Team Championship
2	LSG defeated Brandon Scott	Shane Shamrock Memorial Cup XXIII First Round match
3	Alex Divine defeated Jet Black	Shane Shamrock Memorial Cup XXIII First Round match
4	Ichiban defeated 'Fancy' Ryan Clancy	Shane Shamrock Memorial Cup XXIII First Round match
5	Myles Hawkins defeated Dustin Waller	Shane Shamrock Memorial Cup XXIII First Round match
6	Chris Slade defeated The Mecca	Shane Shamrock Memorial Cup XXIII First Round match
7	Joseph Keys defeated Kekoa	Singles match
8	Ace of Space Academy (Max St. Giovanni and Colton Charles) defeated The Zukkos (Ronnie and Ryan Zukko)	Tag Team Match
9	Demarcus Kane (c) vs. Kaun ended in a No Contest	Singles Match for the MCW Heavyweight Championship
10	Ichiban defeated LSG, Alex Divine, Myles Hawkins, Chris Slade, and 'Miami' Mike Walker	Six-Way Elimination Match for the Shane Shamrock Memorial Cup
(c) / – the champion(s) heading into the match

Competitor	Eliminated by
Chris Slade	Myles Hawkins
Myles Hawkins	Alex Divine
Alex Divine	LSG
’Miami’ Mike Walker (p)	LSG
LSG	Ichiban
Ichiban	Winner
(p) – refers to the previous winner heading into the match

=== Shane Shamrock Memorial Cup XXIV (2025) ===
The 24th annual Shane Shamrock Memorial Cup will take place on July 19, 2025, at the RJ Meyer Arena in Joppa, Maryland.

No.	Results	Stipulations
1	Chris Slade defeated Mark Davidson	Shane Shamrock Memorial Cup XXIV First Round match
2	Alex Divine defeated Will Ferrara	Shane Shamrock Memorial Cup XXIV First Round match
3	Jake St. Patrick defeated Danny Grandview and Love Doug	Shane Shamrock Memorial Cup XXIV First Round Triple Threat match
4	Jadis Quinn defeated Aaron Rourke	Shane Shamrock Memorial Cup XXIV First Round match
5	Sidney Akeem defeated TJ Crawford	Shane Shamrock Memorial Cup XXIV First Round match
6	The Devil's Business (AK Baine and Clay Jacobs) (c) vs The Zukkos (Ronnie and Ryan Zukko) ended in Double Count Out	Tag team match for the MCW Tag Team Championship
7	'Miami' Mike Walker defeated 'The Mecca' Brian Johnson	"I Quit" match
8	Simone Valentina, Shotzi Blackheart, and Bishop Dyer defeated James Ellsworth, Ben Bishop, and Aristote	Six-Person Tag Team Match
9	Chris Slade defeated Alex Divine, Jake St. Patrick, Jadis Quinn, Sidney Akeem, and Ichiban (c)	Six-Way Elimination Match for the Shane Shamrock Memorial Cup
(c) / – the champion(s) heading into the match

Competitor	Eliminated by
Jadis Quinn	Ichiban
Jake St. Patrick	Sidney Akeem
Ichiban (p)	Sidney Akeem
Sidney Akeem	Alex Divine
Alex Divine	Chris Slade
Chris Slade	Winner
(p) – refers to the previous winner heading into the match

=== Shane Shamrock Memorial Cup XXV (2026) ===
The 25th annual Shane Shamrock Memorial Cup will take place on July 18, 2026, at the RJ Meyer Arena in Joppa, Maryland.

No.	Results	Stipulations
1	Alex Divine defeated Diego Cruz	Shane Shamrock Memorial Cup XXV First Round match
2	Daron Richardson defeated Reno	Shane Shamrock Memorial Cup XXV First Round match
3	Raheem Royal defeated JJ Doze and Brandon Scott	Shane Shamrock Memorial Cup XXIV First Round Triple Threat match
4	Danny Grandview defeated Shaun Cannon	Shane Shamrock Memorial Cup XXV First Round match
5	Tyler Breeze defeated Myron Malone	Shane Shamrock Memorial Cup XXV First Round match
6	The Headbangers (Mosh and Thrasher) defeated Sexy & Blessed (Ykies & Chulo Montana) (c)	Tag Team Match for the MCW Tag Team Championship
7	Gia Scott & Sirena Linton defeated Simone Valentina & Izzy Moreno vs.	Tag Team Match
8	Alex Divine defeated Daron Richardson, Raheem Royal, Danny Grandview, Tyler Breeze, & Chris Slade (c)	Six-Way Elimination Match for the Shane Shamrock Memorial Cup
(c) / – the champion(s) heading into the match

Competitor	Eliminated by
Daron Richardson	Raheem Royal
Raheem Royal	Danny Grandview
Danny Grandview	Tyler Breeze
Tyler Breeze	Chris Slade
Chris Slade (p)	Alex Divine
Alex Divine	Winner
(p) – refers to the previous winner heading into the match

== Bruiser Strong Rumble ==
The Bruiser Strong Rumble is an annual match held since 2019. The match is named in honor of RJ "The Bruiser" Meyer, who died from leukemia in 2020. The format started out similar to the Royal Rumble, with the exception that each entrant could be a singles star, a tag team, or a faction, with eliminations occurring when a competitor is tossed over the top rope, with both feet touching the floor. However, in 2022 the format was adjusted to feature 11 stars (one for each heavyweight title reign of The Bruiser), with eliminations occurring as before, however once the 11th entrant (reserved for the heavyweight champion at the time) enters the match, eliminations would then only occur by pinfalls or submissions. In 2019, the prize for winning was a chance to challenge for the MCW Heavyweight Championship at the Shane Shamrock Memorial Cup that year, where since then the prize was the MCW Heavyweight Championship; the title was vacant for the 2021 match, with the defending champion entering the match as the final entrant in the years that followed.

=== Events and winners ===
#	Event	Date	Defending champion	Winner	
#	Event	Date	Defending champion	Winner	No.
1	MCW Slamboree	June 1, 2019	-	Drolix	30
2	Bruiser Strong 2021	September 17, 2021	-	The Mecca	1
3	Bruiser Strong 2022	September 10, 2022	Ken Dixon	The Mecca	5
4	Bruiser Strong 2023	September 16, 2023	Robert Locke	Robert Locke	11
5	Bruiser Strong 2024	September 14, 2024	Demarcus Kane	Kaun	5
6	Bruiser Strong 2025	September 20, 2025	Joseph Keys	Joseph Keys	11
7	Bruiser Strong 2026	September 26, 2026	Patrick Clark	Brandon Scott	10

== Championships ==
=== Active ===
As of November 16, 2026

Championship	Champion(s)	Date won	Days	Location	Note
MCW Heavyweight Championship	Brandon Scott	September 26, 2026	51+	Joppa, Maryland	
MCW Rage TV Championship	Reggie Collins	July 26, 2026	113+	Hollywood, Maryland	
MCW Tag Team Championship	AK Baine & Clay Jacobs	November 15, 2026	1+	Joppa, Maryland	
MCW Women's Championship	Tiara James	November 15, 2026	1+	Joppa, Maryland	

=== Retired ===
Championship	Champion(s)	Previous champion(s)	Date won	Location	Note
MCW Light Heavyweight Championship	Shane Shamrock	N/A	July 19, 1998	Dundalk, MD	Shamrock was the only champion. Shamrock was named lifetime Light Heavyweight Championship after his death due to being shot. The Light Heavyweight Championship was replaced with the Cruiserweight Championship.
MCW Cruiserweight Championship	Ryan McBride	Adam Cole	December 26, 2009	Dundalk, MD	After McBride won the Rage Championship, the Cruiserweight championship was combined with the Rage TV title since he held both titles.

=== Shane Shamrock Memorial Cup winners ===
Name	Date
Christian York	July 8, 1999
Qeenan Creed	July 9, 2000
Joey Matthews	July 18, 2001
Reckless Youth	July 17, 2002
Christian York (2)	July 16, 2003
Ruckus	July 7, 2006
Josh Daniels	July 8, 2007
Derek Frazier	July 19, 2008
Ryan McBride	July 11, 2009
Christian York (3)	July 31, 2010
Sami Callihan	July 30, 2011
Adam Cole	July 7, 2012
Luke Hawx	August 10, 2013
Drolix	July 19, 2014
Lio Rush	July 18, 2015
Lio Rush (2)	July 16, 2016
Joey Matthews (2)	July 15, 2017
Joe Keys	July 14, 2018
Brandon Scott	July 13, 2019
Action Andretti	November 12, 2021
Flip Gordon	July 23, 2022
'Miami' Mike Walker	July 22, 2023
Ichiban	July 13, 2024
Chris Slade	July 19, 2025
Alex Divine	July 18, 2026

== Roster ==
=== Male wrestlers ===
Name	Notes
AK Baine	MCW Tag Team Champion
Alec Odin	
Alex Divine	Shamrock Cup Champion
Aristote	
Austin Kingsley V	
Brandon Scott	MCW Heavyweight Champion
'The Mecca' Brian Johnson	
Chris Slade	
Chuck Lennox	
Chukwu	
Chulo Montana	
Clay Jacobs	MCW Tag Team Champion
Damian Gray	
Danny Grandview	
Demarcus Kane	
Diego Cruz	
Drew Blackwood	
Drolix	
Hellfire McGuire	
Jadis Quinn	
James Ellsworth	
Javari Wolf	
Joseph Keys	
Kelly Burkhart	
Ken Dixon	
Khazman Lee	
Lor Diaz	
Mark Brutal	
'Miami' Mike Walker	
Myles Hawkins	
Myron Malone	
Nick Comoroto	
Nikita	
Patrick Clark	
Reggie Collins	MCW Rage TV Champion
Reno	
Richie Burkhart	
Ronnie Zukko	
Ryan Zukko	
Salem Gray	
Spencer Slade	National Wrestling Alliance
Sponge	
Steven Fuerte	
Stevie Shweezióne	
Teddy	
Tony Macko	
Tyler Root	
Vincenzo Verse	
Ykies	
Zakar Shah	

=== Female wrestlers ===
Name	Notes
Amara Voyd	
Brittany Blake	
Lucky Leone	
Maia Martinez	
Simone Valentina	
Tiara James	MCW Women's Champion
Tina San Antonio	

=== Referees ===
Name	Notes
Jason Tano	
Justin Rodgers	
Justin Vaughn	
Mike Kehner	Senior Referee
Meghan Seerey	

=== Other on-air personnel ===
Name	Notes
Dante Caballero	Manager to Joseph Keys
Juliette	Valet to The Helm
Mr. Rahman	Manager of The Brain Trust, Occasional wrestler
Phil Stamper	General Manager
Tara	Assistant General Manager, Backup Ring Announcer

=== Broadcast team ===
Name	Notes
Amy Rose	Backstage Interviewer
Danny Mays	Ring Announcer
Dom Demarco	Backstage Correspondent
Pat Anthony	Ring Announcer
Ricky Owens	Commentator
Shawn Credle	Commentator
Sydney Mack	Backstage Interviewer
Timmy Baltimore	Commentator

== Hall of Fame ==
The MCW Hall of Fame is an American professional wrestling hall of fame. It was established in 2009.

Ring name	MCW debut	Year inducted	Notes
Axl Rotten	July 1998	2009	
Barry Hardy	November 2009	2009	
Dennis Wipprecht	N/A	2009	Co-owner of Maryland Championship Wrestling
Duane Gill	December 1998	2009	
Nikolai Volkoff		2009	
Tim "Lucifer" Burke	November 2009	2009	
Adam Flash	July 1998	2010	(3 time) MCW Heavyweight Champion, (4 time) MCW Cruiserweight Champion and (1 time) MCW Tag Team Champion
Dave Casanova	N/A	2010	
Bob Starr	November 2009	2010	
Max Thrasher	November 2011	2010	
Morgus The Maniac	N/A	2010	
Rip Sawyer	November 2009	2010	
Steve Corino	March 2000	2010	

== Media ==
- MCW: Xtreme Measures II DVD. Maryland Championship Wrestling, 2007.
- MCW: Shane Shamrock Tribute Show, 9/20/98. DVD. Maryland Championship Wrestling, 2007.
- MCW: Aggravated Assault. DVD. Maryland Championship Wrestling, 2007.
- MCW: Anniversary 2007. DVD. Maryland Championship Wrestling, 2007.
- MCW: 6th Shane Shamrck Memorial Cup DVD. Maryland Championship Wrestling, 2006.
- MCW: Guerrilla Warfare. DVD. Maryland Championship Wrestling, 2006.
- MCW: Holiday Homecoming. DVD. Maryland Championship Wrestling, 2006.
- MCW: March Madness. DVD. Maryland Championship Wrestling, 2006.
- MCW: Monster Mash. DVD. Maryland Championship Wrestling, 2006.
- MCW: Phenomenal Final Four. DVD. Maryland Championship Wrestling, 2006.
- MCW: Red, White, Black & Bruised. DVD. Maryland Championship Wrestling, 2006.
- MCW: Resurrection. DVD. Maryland Championship Wrestling, 2006.
- MCW: Tribute to the Legends. DVD. Maryland Championship Wrestling, 2006.
- MCW: Xtreme Measures. DVD. Maryland Championship Wrestling, 2006.
- MCW: The Last Dance. DVD. Maryland Championship Wrestling, 2003.
