= Jimmy Cicero =

American professional wrestler (born 1969)

Personal information
- Born: Matthew Bowman; January 2, 1969 (age 57) New York City, New York, U.S.

Professional wrestling career
- Ring name: Jimmy Cicero
- Billed height: 6 ft 1 in (1.85 m)
- Billed weight: 280 lb (127 kg)
- Trained by: Ivan Koloff
- Debut: 1992

Matthew Bowman (born January 2, 1969) is an American professional wrestler, best known by his ring name "Wiseguy" Jimmy Cicero, who has worked for the United States Wrestling Association, Extreme Championship Wrestling, the World Wrestling Federation and various other promotions on the independent circuit. He also works at the Independent Pro Wrestling Association Wrestling School and has trained several wrestlers who later worked for major promotions.

== Professional wrestling career ==
Cicero was trained for his career in professional wrestling by former WWF Champion Ivan Koloff. In 1994, he held the Carolina Championship Wrestling Alliance Tag Team Championship as a member of a tag team known as the Country Club along with Steve Storm. Later that year, the teamed with Brian Perry to form the Rat Pack. On November 17, they won a tournament to become the promotion's first tag team champions. On March 25, 1995, they lost the title to the team of Billy Simmons and Sean Powers.

In 1996, he appeared in Extreme Championship Wrestling (ECW), where he formed a tag team with Balls Mahoney in a loss to Spike and Buh Buh Ray Dudley. Cicero also had matches in ECW against Taz and Axl Rotten in 1996 and 1997. In December 1996, Cicero wrestled against Mahoney, who was using the ring name Boo Bradley, in the Mid-Eastern Wrestling Federation (MEWF), and defeated him to win the MEWF Mid-Atlantic Championship, which Cicero held for six months. He continued to compete for MEWF and held the promotion's Tag Team Championship a total of four times in 1997, three times with Steve Corino and once with Julio Sanchez.

In July 1997, he competed for the National Wrestling Alliance's NWA 2000 promotion, where he won a battle royal to become the first NWA 2000 Heavyweight Champion. He held the belt for over five months before a loss to Lance Diamond.

In 1997, he wrestled for the West Virginia-based Championship Pro Wrestling. He competed against his former student Christian York and defeated him at the promotion's "Hot August Night" event. Cicero had a brief stint in the Memphis-based USWA feuding with Paul Diamond, Steve Corino and Flash Flanagan. Cicero also made his debut with the World Wrestling Federation (WWF) in 1997. He wrestled several matches for the WWF as a jobber; this included a handicap match on the January 12, 1998 episode of Raw is War, in which Cicero teamed with Lance Diamond in a loss to Kurrgan. Cicero continued to compete for the WWF until late in 1998.

While wrestling on the American Atlantic Coast for the Independent Professional Wrestling Alliance in 1997, Cicero competed in a tournament to determine the promotion's Heavyweight Champion. He made it to the final round but ultimately lost to Salvatore Sincere. He later claimed the belt after defeating champion Lance Diamond on February 19, 1998. He held the belt for almost four months before dropping it to Buddy Landel. He later formed a tag team with Cueball Carmichael, and the pair held the promotion's Tag Team Championship twice in 1998 and 1999.

He also appeared regularly in Maryland Championship Wrestling (MCW). He formed a tag team with Julio Sanchez to compete in a tournament for the initial MCW Tag Team Championship. They made it to the final match on August 18, 1998, but ultimately lost to The Headbangers. The following month, Cicero and Sanchez won the title belts by defeating The Headbangers. They held the belts until November, when they dropped them to Stevie Richards and Earl the Pearl. Cicero regained the title the following year, however, while teaming with Romeo Valentine; they held the belts for over four months before losing them to The Bruiser and Jerry Lawler. Cicero also held the promotions's Heavyweight Championship, as he defeated The Bruiser for the title on July 19, 2000. He dropped the belt four months later to Adam Flash; his rivalry over the belt with Flash continued, as Cicero regained it that December before losing it to Flash again in May 2001.

While competing for MCW, Cicero also wrestled in the Pennsylvania-based Allied Powers Wrestling Federation (APWF), where he held the APWF Heavyweight Championship for one month in 1999 before dropping it to Stevie Richards. He was also awarded the APWF Television Championship on July 30, 1999, which he held until October 2001. Also in 2000, Cicero teamed with Dino Devine in Atlantic Terror Championship wrestling to hold the promotion's tag team title. The duo won the belts on July 15 and held them until the following January, when they dropped them to the team of Mark Shrader and Gregory Martin.

Cicero went on to compete for 6 years in the Pittsburgh, Pennsylvania based RWA where he held the heavyweight title twice, the tag team titles twice with his son Dr. Jack Cicero (Michael Bowman) as well as Akuma. He lost a lengthy feud with Bronco McBride which culminated in a bloody Dog Collar Match.

Cicero left the Pittsburgh area and began competing for Rocket City Championship Wrestling in Alabama in April 2021 under the name Lord James Cicero proclaiming himself the Lord of Alabama. He and his heel group 'The Lords Army' feuded with RCCW mainstays Barry Kohlhoff, Johnny Rodriguez and Scrapiron Lewis. Cicero defeated Super Crazy in a controversial match at WrestleCon 5.

Cicero was the head trainer of the IPWA Wrestling School; among those trained by Cicero were IMPACT wrestler Christian York and WWE wrestler Joey Matthews. Cicero is the current head trainer for Rocket City Championship Wrestling/Al Snow Training Academy in Hazel Green, Alabama.

On December 29, 2012, Cicero was inducted into the MCW Hall of Fame.

== Championships and accomplishments ==
- Allied Powers Wrestling Federation
  - APWF Heavyweight Championship (2 times)
  - APWF Television Championship (1 time)
- Atlantic Terror Championship Wrestling
  - ATCW Tag Team Championship (1 time) – with Dino Devine
- Carolina Championship Wrestling Alliance
  - CCWA Tag Team Championship (1 time) – with Steve Storm
- Continental Wrestling Alliance
  - CWA Tag Team Championship (1 time) – with Steve Storm
- Independent Professional Wrestling Alliance
  - IPWA Heavyweight Championship (1 time)
  - IPWA Tag Team Championship (2 times) – with Cueball Carmichael
- NWA Fusion
  - NWA Continental Heavyweight Championship (1 time)
- NWA 2000
  - NWA 2000 Heavyweight Championship (1 time)
- Maryland Championship Wrestling
  - MCW Heavyweight Championship (2 times)
  - MCW Tag Team Championship (2 times) – with Julio Sanchez (1) and Romeo Valentino (1)
  - MCW Hall of Fame (Class of 2012)
- Mid-Eastern Wrestling Federation
  - MEWF Mid-Atlantic Championship (1 time)
  - MEWF Tag Team Championship (4 times) – with Steve Corino (3) and Julio Sanchez (1)
- Southern Championship Wrestling
  - SCW Heavyweight Championship (1 time)
  - SCW Tag Team Championship (2 times) – with Brian Perry
- Primal Conflict Wrestling
  - DOA Memorial Cup (2010)
- Pro Wrestling Illustrated
  - PWI ranked him # 150 of the 500 best singles wrestlers of the PWI 500 in 1999
- Renegade Wrestling Alliance
  - RWA Heavyweight Championship (1 time)
  - RWA No Limits Championship (1 time)
  - RWA Pennsylvania Regional Championship (1 time)
  - RWA Tag Team Championship (2 times) - with Ron Hunt (1), The Great Akuma (1)
- Rocket City Championship Wrestling
  - Rocket City Heavyweight Championship (1 time)
