= MCW Light Heavyweight Championship =

Professional wrestling championship

Details
- Promotion: Maryland Championship Wrestling (MCW)
- Date established: July 19, 1998
- Date retired: September 20, 1998
Statistics
- First champion: Shane Shamrock
- Final champion: Shane Shamrock
- Most reigns: Shane Shamrock (1 reign)

The MCW Light Heavyweight Championship was a professional wrestling light heavyweight championship owned by the Maryland Championship Wrestling (MCW) promotion. The title was created and debuted on July 19, 1998, at a MCW live event.

The inaugural champion was Shane Shamrock, who defeated Christian York, Joey Matthews, Mark Schrader, Quinn Nash, and Earl the Pearl in a Six Way match on July 19, 1998, win at an MCW live event to become the first and only champion.

== Title history ==
Key
No.	Overall reign number
Reign	Reign number for the specific champion
Days	Number of days held
+	Current reign is changing daily

No.	Champion	Championship change			Reign statistics		Notes	Ref.
No.	Champion	Date	Event	Location	Reign	Days	Notes	Ref.
Maryland Championship Wrestling (MCW)
1	Shane Shamrock	July 19, 1998	Live event	Baltimore, Maryland	1	63	Shamrock defeated Christian York, Joey Matthews, Mark Schrader, Quinn Nash, and Earl the Pearl in a Six Way match to become the first (and only) champion.	
–	Deactivated	September 20, 1998	Live event	Baltimore, Maryland	1	—	The title was retired following Shamrock's death on August 18, 1998. Shamrock was named "Lifetime Heavyweight Champion" by MCW. Subsequently, the MCW Cruiserweight Championship replaced the Light Heavyweight Championship and the division.	
