= Sidney Stewart (American football) =

American football player

No. 29 – Maryland Terrapins
- Position: Defensive end
- Class: Freshman

Personal information
- Listed height: 6 ft 3 in (1.91 m)
- Listed weight: 255 lb (116 kg)

Career information
- High school: Concordia Preparatory (Towson, Maryland)
- College: Maryland (2025–present)
- Stats at ESPN

Sidney Stewart is an American football defensive end for the Maryland Terrapins.

== Early life ==
Stewart is Baltimore, Maryland. He grew up in Joppa, Maryland and attended high school at Concordia Preparatory located in Towson, Maryland. Coming out of high school, he was rated as a three-star recruit, where he committed to play college football for the Maryland Terrapins.

== College career ==
Heading into the 2025 season, Stewart was named a starter for the Terrapins, as well as being named to the 2025 Preseason Freshman All-America Team. In week one of the 2025 season, he recorded five tackles with three being for a loss, a sack, and a safety in a win over Florida Atlantic. In week two, Stewart recorded three tackles with one being for a loss, and a sack in a victory versus Northern Illinois.

== Personal life ==
Stewart is the son of Lashelle Stewart, a nonprofit Leader in Baltimore and current assistant coach and former professional basketball player Stephen Stewart, while his two uncles Larry and Lynard also played professionally.
