= Julio Dinero =

American retired professional wrestler

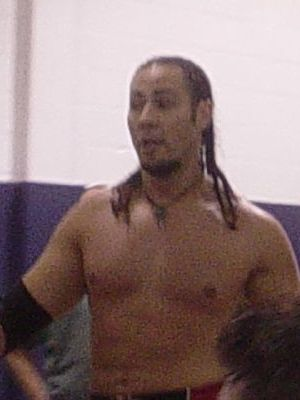
- Dinero in 2005

Personal information
- Born: Brian Wohl; April 14, 1972 (age 54) Washington, D.C., U.S.

Professional wrestling career
- Ring name(s): Brian Wall; Julio Dinero; Julio (S.) Fantastico; Julio Sanchez; Sheik Ali Amin; The Crow; Unknown Soldier
- Billed height: 6 ft 2 in (1.88 m)
- Billed weight: 232 lb (105 kg)
- Billed from: Baltimore, Maryland
- Trained by: Baltimore Monster Factory; Axl Rotten; Hack Meyers; Tom Prichard
- Debut: October 1994
- Retired: 2010

Brian Wohl (born April 14, 1972) is an American retired professional wrestler, better known for his ring name Julio Dinero.

== Professional wrestling career ==
Wohl debuted in 1994 after training at the Baltimore Wrestling Factory under Axl Rotten and Hack Meyers. While wrestling on the independent circuit he worked as an accountant during the day.

In the mid to late 1990s Wohl competed along the east coast in various indy promotions. Among these included the IPWA (Independent Pro Wrestling Association) Wohl was originally cast as the manager of a group known as the "Rat Pack." Jimmy Cicero and Sean "Showtime" Powers comprised that team led by the genius of Wohl's character known as Sheik Ali Amin. Amin eventually became a Sting/Crow like character who was exposed by poor production values and slamming doors in the IPWA's home "arena", The Secret Cove in 1998.

In the late 1990s Wohl worked for both World Championship Wrestling (as Julio Sanchez) and the World Wrestling Federation (as Sanchez or Julio Fantastico). He was a jobber in both promotions, wrestling dark matches and on B-Shows such as WCW Thunder and Sunday Night Heat. While in the WWF, he was sent to the Funkin' Dojo to train with Dory Funk, Jr. and Tom Prichard.

After being booked on the infamous Heroes of Wrestling pay-per-view in 1999 against 2 Cold Scorpio, he joined Extreme Championship Wrestling, where he formed a tag team with EZ Money known as Hot Commodity. Wohl was renamed Julio Dinero and given the character of a gigolo. He made his ECW pay-per-view debut on November 5, 2000 at November To Remember 2000. Wohl remained with ECW until the promotion went bankrupt in March 2001.

On February 9, 2003, Wohl debuted in Delaware Championship Wrestling competing in the first-ever DCW International Heavyweight Championship Match against "The Madman" Glen Osbourne. Wohl would go on to win the DCW Television Championship in April 2003. The Television Championship would later be renamed the No Limits Championship in 2004. In early 2004, Delaware Championship Wrestling would change its name to Dynamite Championship Wrestling. Wohl has made other appearances over the years, but not on a full-time basis.

On February 26, 2003 Wohl debuted in Total Nonstop Action Wrestling. In September 2003, he was a part of The Gathering, Raven's stable. Along with Raven, CM Punk and Alexis Laree, Wohl feuded with Shane Douglas and the Disciples of the New Church. On September 24 the Gathering defeated the Disciples in a Dog Collar Match, but were hanged from the rafters using chains afterwards. Alexis Laree was hired by World Wrestling Entertainment, and on December 17 Punk and Wohl turned on Raven. They feuded with Raven for several weeks before being released.

Wohl continues to wrestle on the independent circuit, wrestling for KCW (Keystone Championship Wrestling) out of Altoona, PA and most recently debuted in DCW (Diamond Championship Wrestling) based in central PA. Wohl has also worked as security for the 9:30 club in Washington DC for several years. He makes appearances at the indy wrestling fed based in NJ BodySlam Wrestling Organization (BWO).

On May 2, 2008 Wohl appeared as a jobber on an episode of WWE SmackDown in a match against Finlay under his Julio Dinero ring name.

On September 18, 2010 he and tag team partner "Dirty Don" Montoya won the Bodyslam Wrestling Organization "Tag Team Turmoil' tournament n Elmwood Park (formerly East Paterson), NJ. They went on to beat the Saints of Lodi to win the BWO tag team titles. However, Montoya retired immediately after winning the belts.

== Championships and accomplishments ==
- Allied Powers Wrestling Federation
  - APWF Heavyweight Championship (1 time)
  - APWF 2000 Heavyweight Championship (1 time)
- Assault Championship Wrestling
  - Dave Vicious Memorial Cup (2003)
- Cleveland All-Pro Wrestling
  - CAPW North American Tag Team Championship (1 time) - with Chris Hamrick
- Dynamite Championship Wrestling
  - DCW Television Championship (Renamed DCW No Limits Championship) (1 time)
- Independent Professional Wrestling Alliance
  - IPWA Light Heavyweight Championship (4 time)
- Independent Superstars of Professional Wrestling
  - ISPW Tag Team Championship (1 time) – with Glen Osbourne
- Keystone Championship Wrestling
  - KCW Heavyweight Championship (3 times)
- Maryland Championship Wrestling
  - MCW Heavyweight Championship (1 time)
  - MCW Tag Team Championship (1 time) - with Jimmy Cicero
  - MCW Rage Television Championship (1 time)
  - MCW Heavyweight Championship Tournament (2006)
- Maryland Wrestling Federation
  - MWF Heavyweight Championship (1 time)
  - MWF Tag Team Championships (1 time) - with Christian York
- National Wrestling Superstars
  - WSU/NWS King and Queen of the Ring (2006) - with Kara Slice
  - WSU/NWS King and Queen of the Ring (2011) - with Mercedes Martinez
- New Era Pro Wrestling
  - NEPW Heavyweight Championship (2 times)
  - NEPW Triple Crown Heavyweight Championship (2 times)
- New Jack City Wrestling
  - NJCW Tag Team Championship (1 time) - with Don Montoya
- NWA Cyberspace
  - NWA Cyberspace Tag Team Championship (1 time) - with CM Punk
- Pennsylvania Championship Wrestling
  - PCW Heavyweight Championship (2 times)
- Pro Wrestling Illustrated
  - PWI ranked him # 489 of the 500 best singles wrestlers of the PWI Years in 2003.
- Steel City Wrestling
  - SCW Television Championship (1 time)
