= MCW Tag Team Championship =

Professional wrestling tag team championship

Details
- Promotion: MCW Pro Wrestling
- Date established: August 16, 1998
- Current champions: AK Baine & Clay Jacobs
- Date won: November 15, 2026
Statistics
- First champions: The Headbangers (Mosh and Thrasher)
- Most reigns: (as team); The Ghetto Mafia (6 reigns) (as individual); 2-Dope (6 reigns)
- Longest reign: Rush Hour (Deion Epps and Tommy Seto) (523 days)
- Shortest reign: The Slackers and The Ghetto Mafia (<1 day)

The MCW Tag Team Championship is a professional wrestling tag team championship owned by the MCW Pro Wrestling promotion. The titles were created and debuted on August 16, 1998, at a MCW live event. The current champions are The Devil's Business, AK Baine & Clay Jacobs, who are in their second reign as a team and individually.

The inaugural champions were The Headbangers (Mosh and Thrasher), who defeated Jimmy Cicero and Julio Sanchez in the finals of a tournament to win the championship on August 16, 1998, at an MCW live event.

== Title history ==
Key
No.	Overall reign number
Reign	Reign number for the specific champion
Days	Number of days held
+	Current reign is changing daily

No.	Champion	Championship change			Reign statistics		Notes	Ref.
No.	Champion	Date	Event	Location	Reign	Days	Notes	Ref.
Maryland Championship Wrestling (MCW)
1	The Headbangers (Mosh and Thrasher)	August 16, 1998	Live event	Baltimore, Maryland	1	35	Defeated Jimmy Cicero and Julio Sanchez in a tournament final to become the inaugural champions.	
2	Jimmy Cicero and Julio Sanchez	September 20, 1998	Live event	Baltimore, Maryland	1	45		
3	Earl the Pearl and Stevie Richards	November 4, 1998	Live event	Glen Burnie, Maryland	1	95		
4	The Ghetto Mafia (2-Dope and Sydeswype)	February 7, 1999	Live event	Dundalk, Maryland	1	84	Defeated Earl the Pearl and Stevie Richards, and Joey Matthews and Quinn Nash in a three-way match.	
5	The Bruiser and Danny Rose	May 2, 1999	Live event	Dundalk, Maryland	1	14		
6	The Ghetto Mafia (2-Dope and Sydeswype)	May 16, 1999	Live event	Glen Burnie, Maryland	2	6		
7	Adam Flash and The Bruiser (2)	May 22, 1999	Live event	Pylesville, Maryland	1	47		
8	Jimmy Cicero (2) and Romeo Valentino	July 8, 1999	Live event	Dundalk, Maryland	1	128		
9	The Bruiser (3) and Jerry Lawler	November 13, 1999	Live event	Owings Mills, Maryland	1	22		
–	Vacated	December 5, 1999	N/A	N/A	—	—	Vacated after Jerry Lawler is unable to defend the championships.	
10	The Holy Rollers (Earl the Pearl (2) and Rich Myers)	January 19, 2000	Live event	Glen Burnie, Maryland	1	119	Defeated Chad Austin and Jimmy Cicero, and Christian York and Joey Matthews in a three-way match.	
11	Christian York and Joey Matthews	May 17, 2000	Live event	Glen Burnie, Maryland	1	77		
12	Christopher Carmichael and Dino Divine	August 2, 2000	Live event	Ocean City, Maryland	1	203	Defeated Christian York and Joey Matthews, The Executions, and Ghetto Mafia in a four-way match.	
13	Romeo Valentino (2) and Ronnie Zukko	February 21, 2001	Live event	Glen Burnie, Maryland	1	108		
14	The Ghetto Mafia (2-Dope and Sydeswype)	June 9, 2001	Live event	Middle River, Maryland	3	39	Defeated Romeo Valentino and Ronnie Zukko, and Earl the Pearl and Rich Myers in a three-way match.	
15	The Holy Rollers (Earl the Pearl (2) and Rich Myers)	July 18, 2001	Live event	Glen Burnie, Maryland	2	108	Defeated 2-Dope and Sydeswype (The Ghetto Mafia), and Romeo Valentino and Zukko in a three-way match.	
16	Christian York and Joey Matthews	November 3, 2001	Live event	Paw Paw, West Virginia	2	200		
17	The Slackers (Chad Bowman and Dino Divine (2))	May 22, 2002	Live event	Glen Burnie, Maryland	1	420		
18	The Ghetto Mafia (2-Dope and Sydeswype)	July 16, 2003	Live event	Glen Burnie, Maryland	4	0	2-Dope and Sydeswype (The Ghetto Mafia) defeated Chad Bowman and Dino Divine (The Slackers), and MEWF Tag Team Champions Buzz Stryker and Derek Wayne in a three-way match to unify both championships.	
–	Unified	July 16, 2003	Live event	Glen Burnie, Maryland	—	—	Maryland Championship Wrestling closes.	
19	The Slackers (Chad Bowman and Dino Divine (2))	February 26, 2006	Live event	Dundalk, Maryland	2	0	Defeated The Holy Rollers, The Ghetto Mafia, and Jason Static and Judas Young in a four-way match to revive the championship.	
20	B.G. and Kip James (The James Gang)	February 26, 2006	Live event	Dundalk, Maryland	1	28	Defeated The Slackers, and The Holy Rollers in a three-way match.	
21	Danny Doring and Danny Jaxx	March 26, 2006	Live event	Dundalk, Maryland	1	42	Danny Doring and Danny Jaxx defeated B.G. and Kip James (The James Gang), The Holy Rollers, and The Slackers in a four-way match.	
22	Jason Static and Scott Fowler	May 7, 2006	Live event	Dundalk, Maryland	1	126		
23	The Bruiser (4) and Genesis	September 10, 2006	Live event	Dundalk, Maryland	1	109		
24	Buzz Stryker and Kelly Bell (Phat Blues Inc.)	December 28, 2006	Live event	Glen Burnie, Maryland	1	114		
25	Ruckus and Sabian (BLKOUT)	April 21, 2007	Live event	Bel Air, Harford County, Maryland	1	141	Defeated Buzz Stryker and Kelly Bell (Phat Blues Inc.), and Buck Chyld and Doyle Day (The Best of Both Worlds) in a three-way match.	
26	The Ghetto Mafia; 2-Dope (5) and Qenaan Creed	September 9, 2007	Live event	Dundalk, Maryland	1	239		
27	Johnny Hardwick and Zachary Shane	April 5, 2008	Live event	Dundalk, Maryland	1	29	Johnny Hardwick and Zachary Shane defeated Ghetto Mafia (2-Dope and Qenaan Creed), and Teddy Stigma and Ryan McBride in a three-way.	
28	The Ghetto Mafia (2-Dope (6)and Qenaan Creed)	May 4, 2008	Live event	Dundalk, Maryland	2	237	2-Dope and Qenaan Creed (The Ghetto Mafia) defeated Johnny Hardwick and Zachary Shane, and Ryan Mcbride and Teddy Stigma in a three-way match	
29	Ryan McBride and Teddy Stigma	December 27, 2008	Live event	Dundalk, Maryland	1	105	Ryan McBride and Teddy Stigma defeated 2-Dope and Qenaan Creed (The Ghetto Mafia) in a ladder match.	
—	Vacated	April 11, 2009	N/A	N/A	—	—	Ryan McBride and Teddy Stigma were stripped of the championships.	
30	D. J. Hyde and Dino Divine (4)	April 11, 2009	Live event	Dundalk, Maryland	1	91	Defeated Cole Calloway and Rhett Titus in a tournament final.	
31	Tyler Hilton and Zachary Shane (2)	July 11, 2009	Live event	Dundalk, Maryland	1	168	Tyler Hilton and Zachary Shane defeated D. J. Hyde and Dino Divine, Cole Calloway and Rhett Titus, Stevie Richards and Sugarmask in a four-way match to win the championships.	
32	Kirby Mack and T. J. Mack (Team Macktion)	December 26, 2009	Live event	Dundalk, Maryland	1	217		
33	(Holy Rollers); Earl the Pearl (4) and Ramblin' Rich Myers (3)	July 31, 2010	Live event	Dundalk, Maryland	3	364		
34	C-Fed and G-Fed (Fed-Up)	July 30, 2011	Live event	Dundalk, Maryland	1	153		
35	Drolix and Marcus Streets (Black Wallstreet)	December 30, 2011	Live event	Dundalk, Maryland	1	98		
36	C-Fed (2) and G-Fed (2) (Fed-Up)	April 6, 2012	Live event	Dundalk, Maryland	2	267		
37	Adam Flash (2) and Ronnie Zukko (2)	December 29, 2012	Live event	Dundalk, Maryland	1	224		
38	Buck Chyld and G-Fed (3)	August 10, 2013	Shane Shamrock Memorial Cup	Dundalk, Maryland	1	224		
39	Napalm Bomb and Solo (Black Wall Street)	March 22, 2014	Live event	Joppatowne, Maryland	1	195		
40	Christian York (3) and Ruckus (2)	October 3, 2014	Live event	Waldorf, Maryland	1	1		
41	Napalm Bomb and Solo (Black Wall Street)	October 4, 2014	Live event	Joppatowne, Maryland	2	84		
42	The Hell Cats (Jimmy Starz and Sexy Steve)	December 27, 2014	Seasons Beatings	Joppatowne, Maryland	1	203		
43	The Ecktourage (Dirty Money and Eric Chapel)	July 18, 2015	Shane Shamrock Memorial Cup	Joppatowne, Maryland	1	77		
44	Sudden Impact (Lio Rush and Patrick Clark)	October 3, 2015	Live Event	Joppatowne, Maryland	1	13	Clark and Rush defeated The Ecktourage and The Hell Cats in a triple threat match to win the championships.	
45	The Ecktourage (Dirty Money and Eric Chapel)	October 16, 2015	Autumn Armageddon Tour 2015	Felton, Delaware	2	190		
46	The Punk Rock All Stars (Drake Carter and Shaun Cannon)	April 23, 2016	MCW Spring Fever Tour 2016 – Day 3	Joppatowne, Maryland	1	84	This was a No Disqualification No Count Out Match. Also during this reign Maryland Championship Wrestling was changed to MCW Pro Wrestling.	
MCW Pro Wrestling (MCW)
47	The Ecktourage (Dirty Money and Eric Chapel)	July 16, 2016	MCW Shane Shamrock Memorial Cup XVI	Joppatowne, Maryland	3	196	This was a 6-Way Gauntlet Match also including Guns For Hire (Bill Collier and Paul Jordane), Black Wall Street (Napalm Bomb and Solo), The Bruiser and Rayo and Cousin Clay and Bo Nekoda.	
48	The Broken Hardys ("Broken" Matt Hardy and Brother Nero)	January 28, 2017	MCW Broken Anniversary MMXVII	Joppatowne, Maryland	1	66	This match was also for the TNA World Tag Team Championship.	
—	Vacated	April 4, 2017	N/A	N/A	—	—	Vacated after The Hardys signed with WWE.	
49	Guns 4 Hire (Bill Collier and Paul Jordane)	April 22, 2017	MCW Spring Fever 2017	Joppatowne, Maryland	1	223	Defeated The Ecktourage for the vacant titles.	
50	The Cartel (Dante Caballero and Joe Keys)	December 1, 2017	MCW Seasons Beatings 2017	Joppatowne, Maryland	1	113		
51	Bobby and Robby	March 24, 2018	MCW Breakthrough: Proving Grounds	Joppatowne, Maryland	1	77		
52	The Cartel (Dante Caballero and Joe Keys)	June 9, 2018	MCW Breakthrough: Shot At Glory	Joppatowne, Maryland	2	35	Cashed in their Golden Boot contract.	
53	Bobby and Robby	July 14, 2018	MCW Shane Shamrock Memorial Cup XVIII – Day 2	Joppatowne, Maryland	2	77		
54	Guns 4 Hire (Bill Collier and Paul Jordane)	September 29, 2018	MCW Tag Wars 2018	Joppatowne, Maryland	2	41	This was a Tag Team Gauntlet match also including The Hell Cats (Jimmy Starz and Sexy Steve), The Punk Rock All Stars (Drake Carter and Shaun Cannon) and Dirty Money and G-Fed.	
55	Sons of Savagery (Bishop Khan and Malcolm Moses)	November 9, 2018	MCW Autumn Armageddon 2018	Joppatowne, Maryland	1	142		
—	Vacated	March 31, 2019	MCW Spring Fever 2019	Joppatowne, Maryland	—	—	Vacated after Sons of Savagery signed with Ring of Honor.	
56	The Saviors (Eric Martin and John Skyler)	July 13, 2019	Shane Shamrock Memorial Cup 2019	Joppatowne, Maryland	1	188	Defeated Bobby and Robby in tournament final for the vacant titles.	
57	Rush Hour (Deion Epps and Tommy Seto)	January 17, 2020	Winter Blast 2020	Joppatowne, Maryland	1	523		
58	Seduce & Destroy (Joe Keys (3) and Breaux Keller)	June 23, 2021	Breakthrough Ep. 2	Joppatowne, Maryland	1	142		
59	Black Wallstreet (Drolix (2) and Chuck Lennox)	November 12, 2021	Shane Shamrock Memorial Cup XX	Joppatowne, Maryland	1	48	This was a three–way match also involving the team of Ken Dixon and Boom Hayden.	
60	The Trade (Killian McMurphy and Myles Hawkins)	December 30, 2021	Last Call at The MCW Arena	Joppatowne, Maryland	1	107		
61	Pat Brink (2) and Alec Odin	April 16, 2022	Breakthrough	Havre De Grace, Maryland	1	98		
62	The Trade (Robert Locke (3) and Eric Martin (2))	July 23, 2022	Shane Shamrock Memorial Cup XXI	Joppatowne, Maryland	1	160	Defeated Alec Odin and Samuel Shaw, who was substituting for Pat Brink	
63	Dante Caballero (3) and Joe Keys (4)	December 30, 2022	Season’s Beatings 2022	Joppatowne, Maryland	3	204		
64	Capital Punishment (Spencer Slade and Tim Spriggs)	July 22, 2023	Shane Shamrock Memorial Cup 2023	Joppatowne, Maryland	1	357		
65	The Hype (Khazman Lee and Myron Malone)	July 13, 2024	Shane Shamrock Memorial Cup 2024	Joppatowne, Maryland	1	167		
66	The Zukkos (Ronnie (3) and Ryan Zukko)	December 27, 2024	Season's Beatings 2024	Joppatowne, Maryland	1	71		
67	The Devil's Business (Clay Jacobs and AK Baine)	March 8, 2025	Winter Blast 2025 - Night 4	Frederick, Maryland	1	141	This was a Handicap match as Ryan opted to defend the titles alone rather than forfeit due to Ronnie Zukko's injury	
66	The Zukkos (Ronnie (4) and Ryan Zukko (2))	July 27, 2025	Summer Slamboree 2025	Dundalk, Maryland	2	216	This was a Street Fight	
67	Sexy & Blessed (Chulo Montana & Ykies)	February 28, 2026	Winter Blast 2026 - Night 3	Ranson, West Virginia	1	140		
68	The Headbangers (Mosh and Thrasher)	July 18, 2026	Shane Shamrock Memorial Cup XXV	Joppatowne, Maryland	2	1		
69	The Heavenly Assassins (Alex Divine & Chris Slade)	July 19, 2026	MCW 28th Anniversary Show	Dundalk, Maryland	1	97	This was a Triple Threat match also involving Sexy & Blessed.	
70	The Brain Trust (Diego Cruz & Zakar Shah)	October 24, 2026	Monster Mash 2026	Joppatowne, Maryland	1	20		
71	The Good Brothers (Doc Gallows and Karl Anderson)	November 13, 2026	Autumn Armageddon Tour - Night 4	Frederick, Maryland	1	2		
72	The Devil's Business (Clay Jacobs and AK Baine)	November 15, 2026	Autumn Armageddon Tour - Night 6	Joppatowne, Maryland	2	1+		

== Combined reigns ==
As of November 16, 2026.

†	Indicates the current champions

=== By team ===
Rank	Team	No.of reigns	Combined days
1	Earl the Pearl and Ramblin' Rich Myers (The Holy Rollers)	3	591
2	Deion Epps and Tommy Seto (Rush Hour)	1	523
3	2-Dope and Qenaan Creed (The Ghetto Mafia)	2	476
4	Dirty Money and Eric Chapel (The Ecktourage)	3	463
5	Chad Bowman and Dino Divine (The Slackers)	2	420
5	C-Fed and G-Fed (Fed-Up)	2	420
7	Spencer Slade and Tim Spriggs (Capital Punishment)	1	357
8	Dante Caballero and Joe Keys (The Cartel)	3	352
9	Ronnie Zukko and Ryan Zukko (The Zukkos)	2	287
10	Napalm Bomb and Solo	2	279
11	Christian York and Joey Matthews	2	277
12	Bill Collier and Paul Jordane (Guns 4 Hire)	2	264
13	Adam Flash and Ronnie Zukko (The New Age Scumbags)	1	224
13	Buck Chyld and G-Fed	1	224
15	Kirby Mack and T.J. Mack (Team Macktion)	1	217
16	Christopher Carmichael and Dino Divine	1	203
16	Jimmy Starz and Sexy Steve (The Hell Cats)	1	203
18	Eric Martin and John Skyler (The Saviors)	1	188
19	Tyler Hilton and Zachary Shane	1	168
20	Khazman Lee and Myron Malone (The Hype)	1	167
21	Robert Locke and Eric Martin (The Trade)	1	160
22	Robby and Bobby	2	154
23	Bishop Khan and Malcolm Moses (Sons of Savagery)	1	142
23	Joe Keys and Breaux Keller (Seduce & Destroy)	1	142
25	Clay Jacobs and AK Baine † (The Devil's Business)	2	142+
26	Ruckus and Sabian (BLKOUT)	1	141
27	Chulo Montana and Ykies (Sexy & Blessed)	1	140
28	2-Dope and Sydeswype (The Ghetto Mafia)	4	129
29	Jimmy Cicero and Romeo Valentino	1	128
30	Jason Static and Scott Fowler	1	126
31	Buzz Stryker and Kelly Bell (Phat Blues Inc.)	1	114
32	The Bruiser and Genesis	1	109
33	Romeo Valentino and Ronnie Zukko	1	108
34	Myles Hawkins and Killian McMurphy (The Trade)	1	107
35	Ryan McBride and Teddy Stigma	1	105
36	Drolix and Marcus Streets (Black Wallstreet)	1	98
36	Pat Brink and Alec Odin	1	98
38	Alex Divine and Chris Slade (The Heavenly Assassins)	1	97
39	Earl the Pearl and Stevie Richards	1	95
40	D. J. Hyde and Dino Divine	1	91
41	Drake Carter and Shaun Cannon (The Punk Rock All Stars)	1	84
42	Brother Nero and "Broken" Matt Hardy (The Broken Hardys )	1	65
43	Drolix and Chuck Lennox (Black Wallstreet)	1	48
44	Adam Flash and The Bruiser	1	47
45	Jimmy Cicero and Julio Sanchez	1	45
46	Danny Doring and Danny Jaxx	1	42
47	Mosh and Thrasher (The Headbangers )	1	36
48	Johnny Hardwick and Zachary Shane	1	29
49	B.G. and Kip James (The James Gang )	1	28
50	The Bruiser and Jerry Lawler	1	22
51	Diego Cruz and Zakar Shah (The Brain Trust)	1	20
52	The Bruiser and Danny Rose	1	14
53	Lio Rush and Patrick Clark (Sudden Impact)	1	13
54	The Good Brothers (Doc Gallows and Karl Anderson)	1	2
55	Christian York and Ruckus	1	1

=== By wrestler ===
Rank	Wrestler	No. of reigns	Combined days
1	Dino Divine	4	714
2	Earl the Pearl	4	686
3	G-Fed	3	644
4	Ronnie Zukko	4	619
5	2-Dope	6	605
6	Ramblin' Rich Myers	3	591
7	Deion Epps	1	523
7	Tommy Seto	1	523
9	Joe Keys	4	494
10	Qenaan Creed	2	476
11	Dirty Money	3	463
11	Eric Chapel	3	463
13	C-Fed	2	420
13	Chad Bowman	2	420
15	Spencer Slade	1	357
15	Tim Spriggs	1	357
17	Dante Caballero	3	352
18	Eric Martin	2	348
19	Robert Locke/Robby	3	314
20	Ryan Zukko	2	287
21	Napalm Bomb	2	279
21	Solo	2	279
23	Christian York	3	278
24	Joey Matthews	2	277
25	Adam Flash	2	271
26	Bill Collier	2	264
26	Paul Jordane	2	264
28	Romeo Valentino	2	236
29	Buck Chyld	1	224
30	Kirby Mack	1	217
30	T.J. Mack	1	217
32	Pat Brink/Genesis	2	207
33	Christopher Carmichael	1	203
33	Jimmy Starz	1	203
33	Sexy Steve	1	203
36	Zachary Shane	2	197
37	The Bruiser	4	192
38	John Skyler	1	188
39	Jimmy Cicero	2	173
40	Tyler Hilton	1	168
41	Khazman Lee	1	167
41	Myron Malone	1	167
43	Bobby	2	154
44	Drolix	2	146
45	Ruckus	2	142
45	Bishop Khan	1	142
45	Malcolm Moses	1	142
45	Breaux Keller	1	142
49	Clay Jacobs †	2	142+
49	AK Baine †	2	142+
51	Sabian	1	141
52	Chulo Montana	1	140
52	Ykies	1	140
54	Sydeswype	4	129
55	Jason Static	1	126
55	Scott Fowler	1	126
57	Buzz Stryker	1	114
57	Kelly Bell	1	114
59	Myles Hawkins	1	107
59	Killian McMurphy	1	107
61	Ryan McBride	1	105
61	Teddy Stigma	1	105
63	Marcus Streets	1	98
63	Alec Odin	1	98
65	Alex Divine	1	97
65	Chris Slade	1	97
67	Stevie Richards	1	95
68	D. J. Hyde	1	91
69	Drake Carter	1	84
69	Shaun Cannon	1	84
71	Brother Nero	1	65
71	"Broken" Matt Hardy	1	65
73	Chuck Lennox	1	48
74	Julio Sanchez	1	45
75	Danny Doring	1	42
75	Danny Jaxx	1	42
77	Mosh	1	36
77	Thrasher	1	36
79	Johnny Hardwick	1	29
80	B.G. James	1	28
80	Kip James	1	28
82	Jerry Lawler	1	22
83	Diego Cruz	1	20
83	Zakar Shah	1	20
85	Danny Rose	1	14
86	Lio Rush	1	13
86	Patrick Clark	1	13
88	Doc Gallows	1	2
88	Karl Anderson	1	2

== Notes ==
1. – Each reign is ranked highest to lowest; reigns with the exact same number mean that they are tied for that certain rank.
