= Shane Shamrock =

American professional wrestler (1975–1998)

Personal information
- Born: Brian Stephan Howser; February 8, 1975 Baltimore, Maryland, U.S.
- Died: August 18, 1998 (aged 23) Glen Burnie, Maryland, U.S.
- Cause of death: Gunshot wounds

Professional wrestling career
- Ring name: Shane Shamrock
- Billed height: 1.80 m (5 ft 11 in)
- Billed weight: 102 kg (225 lb)
- Trained by: Axl Rotten
- Debut: 1993

Brian Stephen Howser (February 8, 1975 – August 18, 1998), known by his ring name Shane Shamrock, was an American professional wrestler best known for his time Maryland Championship Wrestling. He is the only wrestler to win the Light Heavyweight Champion in the company's history, having become the inaugural champion two months before his death.

== Career ==
Howser took his ring name of "Shane Shamrock" as a tribute to his adopted father, Bob Shamrock. He wrestled in independent promotions including Mid-Eastern Wrestling Federation, but is likely best known for his time in Maryland Championship Wrestling. During his time in MCW, he won the Light Heavyweight Championship in a 6-way match on July 19, 1998.

== Death ==
Howser died at the age of 23 on August 18, 1998, after being fatally shot by police during an altercation at his Glen Burnie, Maryland, home. Officers were responding to a 9-1-1 call from his girlfriend after Howser allegedly threatened to stab her with a kitchen knife. Howser was then shot and killed by responding officers after refusing to drop the weapon. He was posthumously named "The Lifetime MCW Light Heavyweight Champion" with the organization retiring the title a month after his death. The MCW Cruiserweight Championship was created in its place.

== Championships and accomplishments ==
- Maryland Championship Wrestling
  - MCW Light Heavyweight Championship (1 time, First & Final)

== See also ==
- List of premature professional wrestling deaths
