= Action Andretti =

American professional wrestler

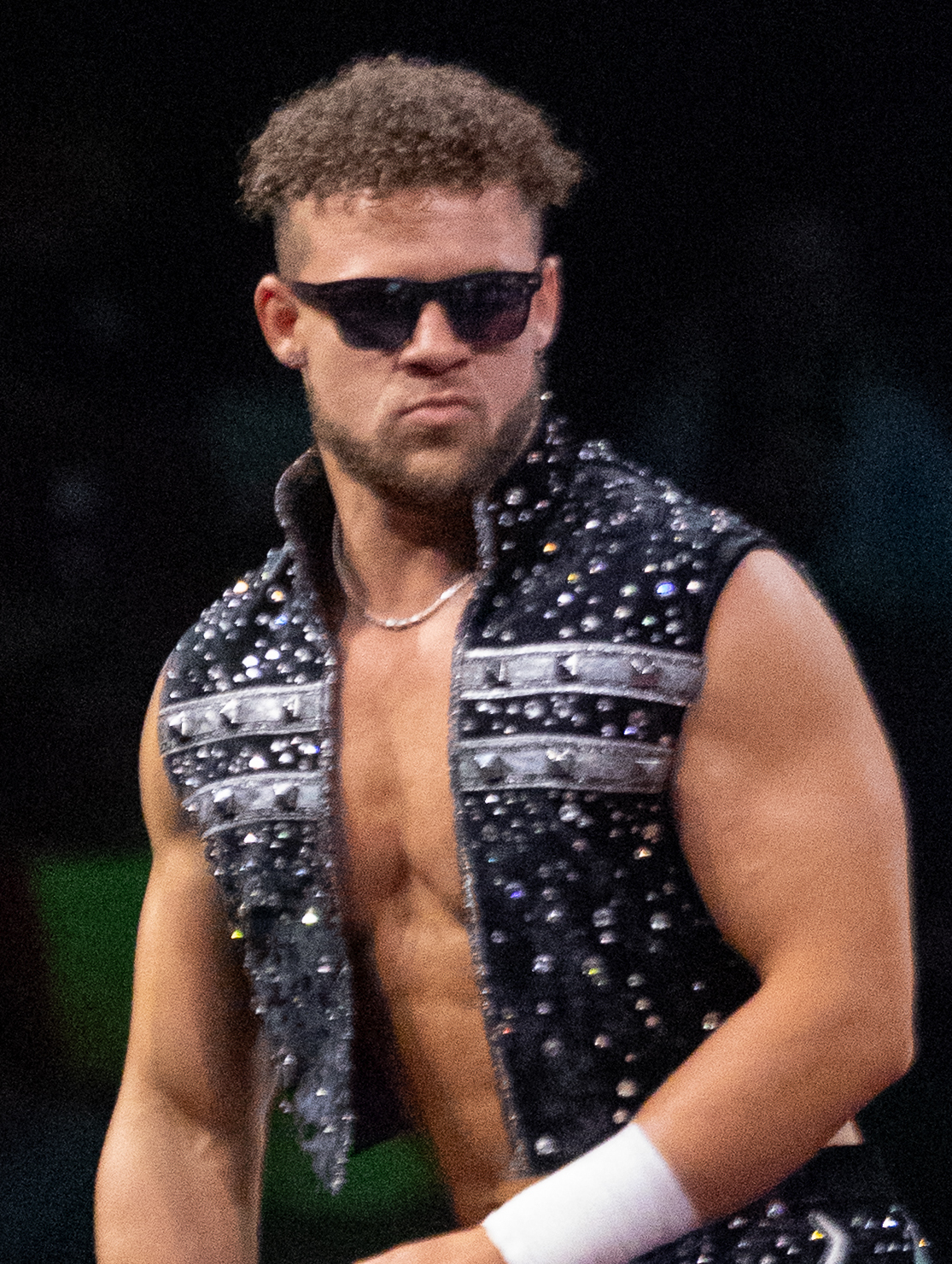
- Andretti in 2026

Personal information
- Born: Tyler Reber; February 1, 1998 (age 28) Philadelphia, Pennsylvania, U.S.

Professional wrestling career
- Ring names: Action Andretti; Tyler Andretti
- Billed height: 5 ft 8 in (173 cm)
- Billed weight: 185 lb (84 kg)
- Billed from: Philadelphia, Pennsylvania, U.S.
- Trained by: MCW Pro Wrestling
- Debut: November 2, 2019

Tyler Reber (born February 1, 1998) is an American professional wrestler. He is signed to All Elite Wrestling (AEW), where he performs under the ring name Action Andretti and is a member of The Opps. He also makes appearances for its sister promotion Ring of Honor (ROH), where he is the current ROH World Television Champion in his first reign.

== Professional wrestling career ==
=== Early career (2019–2022) ===
Andretti was trained to wrestle by MCW Pro Wrestling, debuting in November 2019. Over the following year, he primarily appeared with MCW Pro Wrestling in Maryland and Virginia. In June 2021, Andretti debuted with Game Changer Wrestling, competing in a scramble match on its "Zombie Walk" pay-per-view. Over the rest of 2021, he appeared with MCW Pro Wrestling, Game Changer Wrestling, and other promotions in the northeastern United States including National Championship Wrestling, Pennsylvania Premiere Wrestling, and the Susquehanna Wrestling Organization. In November 2021, he won the Shane Shamrock Memorial Cup promoted by MCW Pro Wrestling. Beginning in January 2022, Andretti began appearing regularly with Combat Zone Wrestling. In October 2022, he defeated Brian Johnson to win the MCW Heavyweight Championship. In December 2022, he lost the title to Ken Dixon in a four way match.

=== All Elite Wrestling / Ring of Honor (2022–present) ===
==== Feud with Chris Jericho (2022–2023) ====
Andretti made his first appearance with All Elite Wrestling (AEW) in January 2022, losing to Dante Martin on an episode of AEW Dark: Elevation. He made further appearances with AEW in January and October of that year. In December 2022, he made his AEW television debut at Dynamite: Winter Is Coming, defeating Chris Jericho in an upset that drew comparisons to the May 17, 1993 bout between Razor Ramon and The Kid. Shortly thereafter, Andretti signed a full-time contract with the company. Andretti teamed with Jericho's enemy Ricky Starks on the January 25, 2023 episode of AEW Dynamite, losing to Jericho and Sammy Guevara in a tag-team match. On the March 1 edition of Dynamite, Andretti participated in the Face of the Revolution ladder match, but the match was won by Powerhouse Hobbs. On March 5 at Revolution, Andretti helped Starks defeat Jericho, by stopping Jericho's Jericho Appreciation Society stablemates from interfering in the match. Starks' victory marked the end of both men's feud with Jericho.

==== Teaming with Top Flight (2023–2024) ====
On April 13, 2023 Andretti made his debut for AEW's sister promotion Ring of Honor, saving Darius Martin from an attack at the hands of Mike Bennett, causing the two men to form an alliance. The following week, the duo teamed against The Kingdom (Bennett and Matt Taven), but lost. On May 18, the duo faced Taven and Bennett in a Fight without Honor rematch, where Andretti and Martin defeated the duo, ending their feud. On June 15, Andretti and Martin teamed with AR Fox to challenge Mogul Embassy for the ROH World Six-Man Tag Team Championship, but the trio was defeated. The trio teamed on Dynamite, facing off against Sammy Guevara, Minoru Suzuki and Chris Jericho, but were defeated once again. On July 22, Martin and Andretti made their debut as a team on AEW Collision, losing to Bullet Club Gold (Jay White and Juice Robinson).

On the October 14, 2023 episode of Collision, Miro attacked Andretti after he expressed an interest in being managed by Miro's wife CJ; this led to a match between the two men on Collision that was won by Miro. In November 2023, Andretti began teaming with Top Flight (Darius Martin and his brother Dante Martin) in a series of six-man tag team matches. In December 2023, Andretti and Top Flight unsuccessfully challenged The Acclaimed and Billy Gunn for the AEW World Trios Championship. In August 2024 at All In, Andretti and Top Flight were on the winning team of a 16-man tag team match. In October 2024, Andretti and Top Flight unsuccessfully challenged the Blackpool Combat Club for the AEW World Trios Championship.

==== CRU (2024–2026) ====
On the December 4 episode of Dynamite, Andretti and Lio Rush eliminated Top Flight during the Dynamite Dozen Battle Royale, teasing a split in the alliance. On December 14 at the Winter is Coming special episode of Collision, Andretti and Rush defeated Top Flight, earning a future AEW World Tag Team Championship title shot. On the January 4, 2025 episode of Collision, Andretti and Rush failed to capture the titles from Private Party. On January 18 at the Maximum Carnage special episode of Collision, Andretti and Rush attacked Top Flight, turning heel. On the February 22 episode of Collision, Andretti and Rush revealed their team name to be "CRU" as an acronym for "crazy, ruthless, and unhinged".

On the January 8, 2026 episode of ROH on HonorClub, Andretti and Rush added Lacey Lane to CRU.

==== The Opps (2026–present) ====
At Supercard of Honor on May 15, 2026, CRU disbanded after Andretti costed Rush an ROH World Television Championship match against AR Fox. On August 21 at Death Before Dishonor, Andretti defeated Rush in a Fight Without Honor to win the ROH World Television Championship with assistance from the Opps, who Andretti would later join.

=== Consejo Mundial de Lucha Libre (2025) ===
On June 17, 2025, CRU made their Consejo Mundial de Lucha Libre (CMLL) debut at Martes de Arena Mexico event where they unsuccessfully challenged Los Nuevos Ingobernables (Ángel de Oro and Niebla Roja) for the CMLL World Tag Team Championship.

== Professional wrestling style and persona ==
Andretti wrestles in a high-flying style. His finishing move is the running shooting star press. He is nicknamed "the Sight to See".

== Championships and accomplishments ==
- MCW Pro Wrestling
  - MCW Heavyweight Championship (1 time)
  - Shane Shamrock Memorial Cup (2021)
- Pro Wrestling Illustrated
  - Ranked No. 410 of the top singles wrestlers in the PWI 500 in 2026
- Ring of Honor
  - ROH World Television Championship (1 time, current)
