= Joppa, Maryland =

Unincorporated community in Maryland, United States

- Unincorporated community
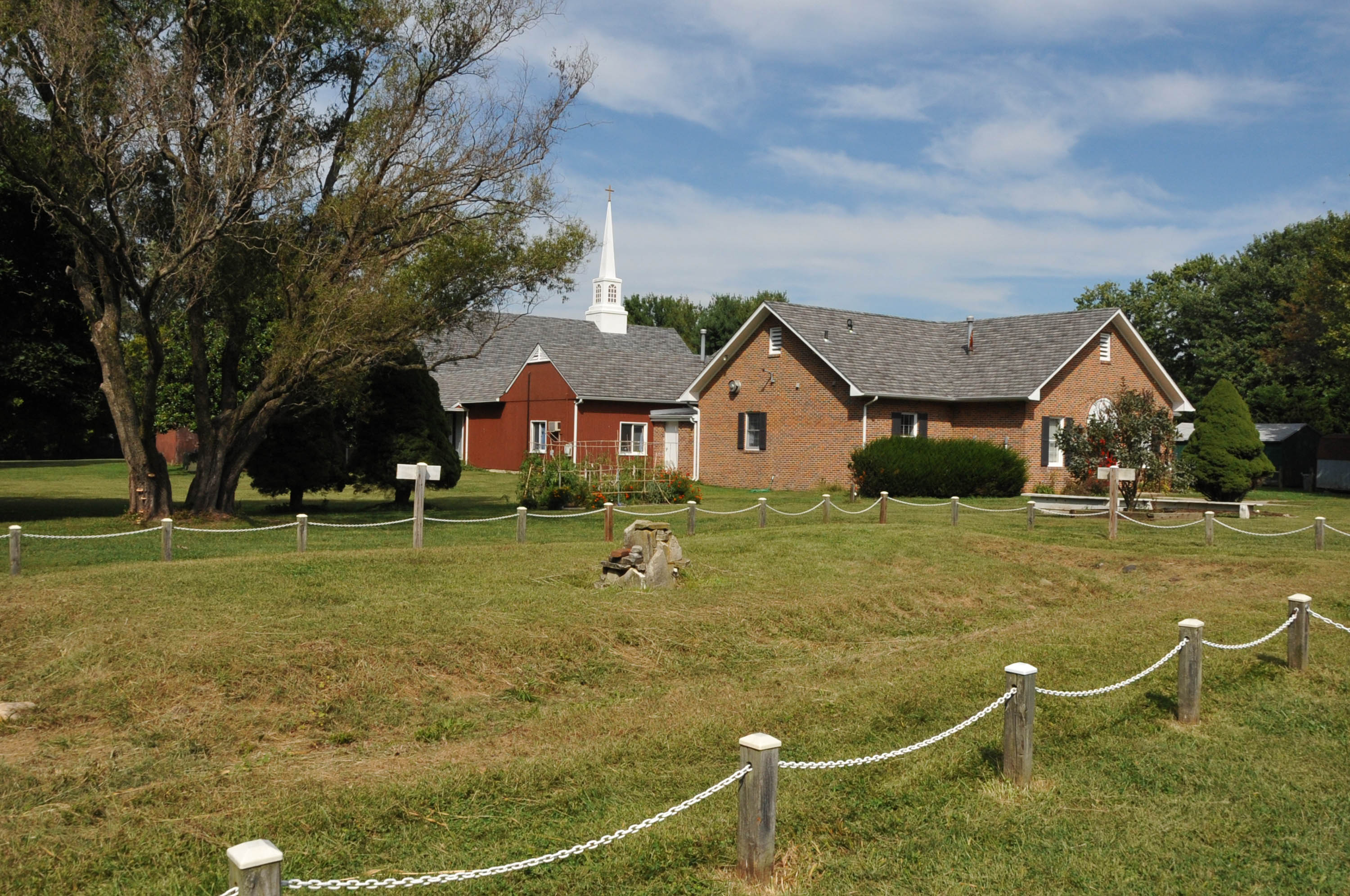
- Historic church site in Joppa

- Location within Maryland Location within the United States
- Coordinates: 39°26′01″N 76°21′28″W
- Country: United States
- State: Maryland
- County: Harford
- Elevation: 15 ft (4.6 m)

Population
  - Total: 12,304
- Time zone: UTC-5 (Eastern (EST))
  - Summer (DST): UTC-4 (EDT)
- ZIP code: 21085
- Area codes: 410 & 443

Joppa (/ˈdʒɒpə/ JOP-ə) is a former colonial town and current planning region of Harford County, Maryland, United States. Joppa was founded as a British settlement on the Gunpowder River in 1707 and designated as the third county seat of Baltimore County in 1712. The original boundaries of Baltimore County were defined in 1659 and contained all of modern day Baltimore County, Baltimore City, Harford and Cecil counties and parts of Howard, Carroll, Anne Arundel and Kent counties. The settlement was named for the Biblical town of Jaffa in the ancient Holy Land of modern-day Israel. Joppa's harbor began to silt in due to clearcutting and farming upriver and coupled with multiple outbreaks of diseases such as smallpox and malaria, the county seat was moved to the growing, deep water port of Baltimore in 1768. Joppa's population would decline rapidly thereafter and businesses left for more prosperous environments in the new Baltimore Town.

== History ==
The town of Joppa near the Western Shore of the Chesapeake Bay was designated as a "Port of Entry" by the colonial legislature, the Maryland General Assembly. It traded internationally in agricultural products, primarily tobacco; the chief commodity crop and currency throughout much of its colonial era.

At its peak, the port was home to about 50 or more homes, the courthouse, two prisons, a church, several inns, shops, and warehouses.

In 1768, the Maryland General Assembly moved the county seat of Baltimore County from Joppa to Baltimore Town, which was developing as a major port. A new courthouse was built in the center of town that year.

With court and related trade business diverted to Baltimore, much of the population followed. By 1815, all that remained of Joppa were the church and a few ruins of once stately homes, shops and warehouses. The Rumsey Mansion, home to Maryland's first and longest serving Chief Judge of the Maryland Supreme Court, Benjamin Rumsey, is the only remaining structure from that period.

The McComas Institute was listed on the National Register of Historic Places in 1980. Olney was listed in 1987, and Whitaker's Mill Historic District in 1990.

=== Film location ===
Joppa is the site of large film sound-stages constructed for use in interior scenes of the US television series House of Cards. Sets include the full-scale reconstruction of the West Wing of the White House and Congressional offices.

=== Education ===
Harford County Public Schools operates the public schools. Trinity Lutheran Christian School, a PreK–12 Christian school, is located in Joppa.

Joppa as it is known today is a planning region within Harford County and a federal zip code designation that includes modern day Joppatowne. It is a distinct community with an identity all its own that dates to the end of the colonial era of its namesake town.

== Notable people ==
Zion Elee - American football player

Sidney Stewart - American football player

Wendy Davis - Actress

Dave Boswell - Baseball player

== See also ==
- Joppatowne, Maryland
- Joppa Iron Works
