= Hollywood, Maryland =

Unincorporated community in Maryland, U.S.

Coordinates: 38.345426°N 76.569214°W

Hollywood is an unincorporated community located within St. Mary's County, Maryland, United States. It was named in 1867, when a storeowner at Thompson's General Store near the Uniontown section of Hollywood required a name for the post office inside the store. The storeowner was inspired by the gigantic holly tree planted in front of the store and named the post office Hollywood.

== History ==
Hollywood is home to distinctive landmarks such as the congregation of St. John Francis Regis Catholic Church, which was founded in 1690. The area also includes the nationally renowned Sotterley Plantation on the banks of the Patuxent River. Sotterley was founded in 1703 by James Bowles, a wealthy planter, eventually changing hands to former Maryland Governor George Plater and through the 20th century to Louisa Satterlee (daughter of J.P. Morgan) and her husband. The town is also home to a recently demolished manor house, Resurrection Manor, which was thought to have been built in 1640 by Thomas Cornwalleys, the grandfather of the General Lord Cornwallis who surrendered to George Washington at the Battle of Yorktown during the American Revolutionary War.

On December 24 1947, Fulton Lewis Jr. broadcast his nightly Mutual Broadcasting System program as a Christmas special from a small church in Hollywood, hosted by his daughter Betsy Lewis, while Lewis Jr. himself accompanied her narration on the organ. The broadcast was so well received that it was re-broadcast by transcription the following night on Christmas. The transcription disc for this broadcast is housed at American University in the John R. Hickman Collection.

== Economy ==
The contemporary community of Hollywood now serves as a small rural community with extensive farms that produce soybean, corn, hay, grains, wheats, and formerly tobacco. It currently hosts an industrial park where corporations such as Northrop Grumman have branch offices. There is a training/conference center for engineers attached to the nearby Patuxent River Naval Air Station. Numerous roads lead to the shore of the Patuxent River. Hollywood is not an incorporated town, residing under the direct authority of the St. Mary's County Commissioners.

== Schools ==
Hollywood is home to Hollywood Elementary School on Joy Chapel Road, which is divided into multiple "houses" that each emphasize a different culture from around the world. Hollywood is also the home of St. John Francis Regis Catholic School. St. John's School was opened on September 12, 1923 under the leadership of Rev. Joseph M. Johnson, S.J. The first four grades were taught in the sacristy of the church and grades five through eight were held in a second story room over the sacristy.

From the 1920s until the 1980s, the school was staffed by the Sisters of Charity of Nazareth, Kentucky. On May 20, 1924 the white frame section of the school was completed as a four-room school building. On June 15, 1952 a brick addition of two classrooms, auditorium and full basement were completed. Later, part of the auditorium was partitioned to make two additional classrooms and the remaining auditorium space was converted to a library.

In February 2010, the roof above the library, auditorium, fourth grade, and fifth grade classrooms collapsed due to a major snowstorm. Community volunteers as well as volunteer firefighters from HWVFD came together to help clear the debris and, after the snow melted, reconstruction began. The white frame section was remodeled and the brick addition was rebuilt, with the reconstructed building finally reopening the following January.

== Socks the cat ==
Socks, the cat of President Bill Clinton and Hillary Clinton, lived in Hollywood after the Clintons left the White House in 2001. Socks, who lived with Bill Clinton's secretary Betty Currie, was euthanized in 2009 at an age of nearly twenty after several years of declining health.
