= David Baker =

David Baker may refer to:

== Arts and entertainment ==
- David Baker (composer) (1931–2016), American symphonic jazz composer
- David Baker (poet) (born 1954), American poet
- David Baker (singer), former lead singer for Mercury Rev
- David Aaron Baker (born 1963), American actor and audiobook narrator
- David Erskine Baker (1730–1767), English drama critic
- David Howard Baker (c. 1946–2004), American audio engineer
- David Baker (born 1931), Australian film director and writer of Libido

== Law and politics ==
- David Baker (activist), American activist and founder of Community Against Pollution
- David Gordon Baker (1884–1958), justice of the South Carolina Supreme Court
- David Hume Baker (1841–1916), state legislator in Kentucky and then Florida
- David J. Baker (1792–1869), US senator from Illinois
- David J. Baker Jr. (1834–1899), American judge, son of David J. Baker
- David L. Baker, justice of the Iowa Supreme Court
- David Martin Baker (1923–2010), Republican member of West Virginia State House of Delegates
- Dave Baker (Kansas politician) (born 1955), member of the Kansas House of Representatives
- Dave Baker (Minnesota politician) (born 1962), Minnesota politician

== Religion ==
- Augustine Baker (1575–1641), English Benedictine mystic, born David Baker
- David Bristow Baker (1803–1852), English religious writer

== Science ==
- David Baker (author) (born 1944), British space scientist and author
- David Baker (biochemist) (born 1962), American biochemist and 2024 Nobel Laureate
- David H. Baker (animal nutritionist) (1939–2009), American animal nutritionist
- David Baker, aerospace engineer, co-author of the Mars Direct proposal
- David Baker-Gabb (born 1952), ornithologist
- David P. Baker (born 1952), American sociologist

== Sports ==
- Dave Baker (American football) (1937–2002), American football player
- Dave Baker (baseball) (born 1956), baseball player
- David Baker (cricketer, born 1935) (1935–2021), English cricketer
- David Baker (cricketer, born 1945), English cricketer
- David Baker (cyclist) (born 1965), British Olympic mountainbike racer
- David Baker (track cyclist) (born 1965), English Commonwealth Games cyclist
- C. David Baker (born 1953), former president & CEO of the Pro Football Hall of Fame; former commissioner of the Arena Football League
- Paul Baker (footballer) (David Paul Baker, born 1963), English professional footballer

== Other ==
- David Baker (academic and musician) (born 1952), British academic librarian and organist
- David Baker (architect) (born 1949), American architect
- David Baker, detective involved in the introductory use of DNA profiling
- David Baker, experimental historian, propmaker, blacksmith, and, judge on Forged in Fire
- David Bakes Baker (born 1986), American professional poker player
- David ODB Baker (born 1972), American professional poker player
- David William Baker (born 1959), British businessman
