= Gab =

Gab or GAB may refer to:

== Organizations ==
- Games and Amusements Board, a Philippine sports and gambling regulatory government agency
- Georgia Academy for the Blind
- German American Bund, a German-American pro-Nazi organization (1936–1941)
- Government Accountability Board, a defunct (since 2016) Wisconsin political regulatory institution
- Greater Atlantic Bank, a defunct American community bank

== Places ==
- Gab, Iran, a village in Hormozgan Province
- Great Artesian Basin, in Australia
- Great Australian Bight, an open bay

== Other uses ==
- Gáb, a cuneiform sign
- Gab (social network), an American social networking platform
- "Gab" (song), an Occitan boasting song of the Middle Ages
- The Great American Bash, a professional wrestling event

== See also ==
- Gabb (disambiguation)
- Gabs (disambiguation)
- Gabriel (disambiguation)
