= The Great American Bash (2006) =

World Wrestling Entertainment pay-per-view event

- Promotional poster featuring Batista
- Promotion: World Wrestling Entertainment
- Brand: SmackDown!
- Date: July 23, 2006
- City: Indianapolis, Indiana
- Venue: Conseco Fieldhouse
- Attendance: 9,750
- Buy rate: 227,000

Pay-per-view chronology
← Previous; Vengeance	Next → SummerSlam

The Great American Bash chronology
← Previous; 2005	Next → 2007

The 2006 Great American Bash was a professional wrestling pay-per-view (PPV) event produced by World Wrestling Entertainment (WWE). It was WWE's third annual Great American Bash and 17th overall. The event took place on July 23, 2006, at the Conseco Fieldhouse in Indianapolis, Indiana, held exclusively for wrestlers from the promotion's SmackDown! brand division.

This was the last brand-exclusive Great American Bash during the first brand split period (2002–2011), as following WrestleMania 23 in April 2007, brand-exclusive PPVs were discontinued. There would not be another brand-exclusive Great American Bash event until 2020 during the second brand split period that began in 2016, with The Great American Bash becoming an exclusive annual event for WWE's developmental brand, NXT.

The main event was Rey Mysterio versus King Booker for the World Championship, which King Booker won by pinfall after Chavo Guerrero interfered—the title subsequently went back to being called the World Heavyweight Championship. One of the predominant matches on the card was The Undertaker versus Big Show in the first Punjabi Prison match, which The Undertaker won by escaping the structure. Another primary match on the undercard was Batista versus Mr. Kennedy, which Kennedy won after Batista was disqualified.

The Great Khali and Bobby Lashley were originally scheduled to compete in their respective matches against The Undertaker in the Punjabi Prison match and against Finlay for the WWE United States Championship, but they were both pulled from the event due to elevated enzymes in the liver that would possibly signify hepatitis. Further tests came back clear for them both after the event. Mark Henry was also scheduled to compete against the returning Batista in a grudge match, however, he ruptured his patellar tendon and dislocated his kneecap just before this event in a match on Saturday Night's Main Event XXXIII, forcing a replacement in the form of Mr. Kennedy.

== Production ==
=== Background ===
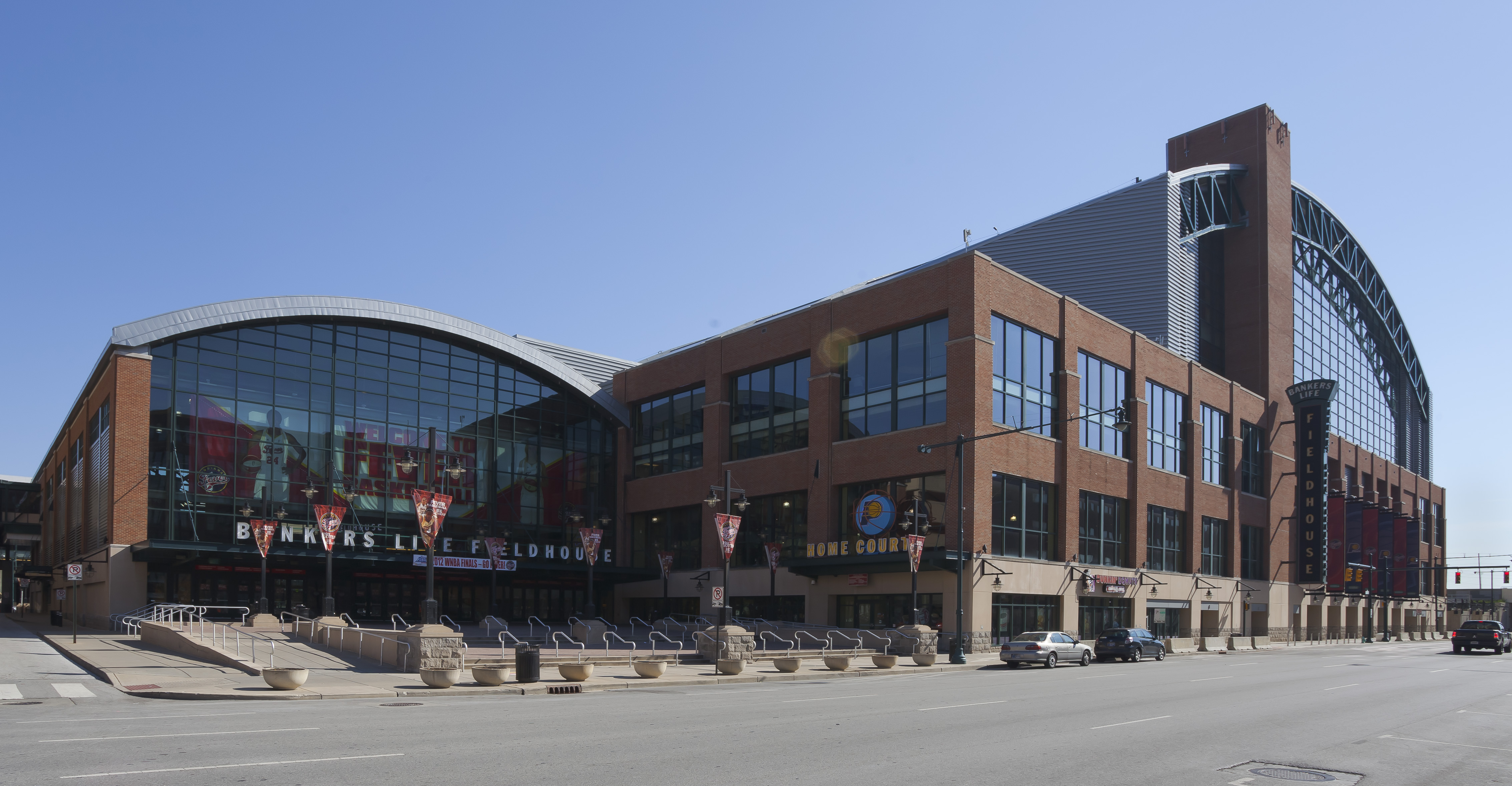
WWE's third annual Great American Bash was held at the Conseco Fieldhouse in Indianapolis, Indiana.

The Great American Bash is a professional wrestling event established in 1985, held during the summer. Following World Wrestling Entertainment's (WWE) acquisition of World Championship Wrestling (WCW) in March 2001, WWE revived The Great American Bash as its own annual pay-per-view (PPV) event in 2004. WWE's third annual Great American Bash, and 17th overall, was scheduled to be held on July 23, 2006, at the Conseco Fieldhouse in Indianapolis, Indiana. Like the previous two years, it featured wrestlers exclusively from the SmackDown! brand.

=== Storylines ===
The main feud heading into The Great American Bash was between Rey Mysterio and King Booker over the World Championship. On the July 7 episode of SmackDown!, King Booker became the number one contender to the World Championship by last eliminating William Regal and Matt Hardy in a Battle Royal. Later that night, King Booker and Queen Sharmell, King Booker's wife, attacked Mysterio backstage, and executed a low blow.

I will beat this peasant (Mysterio), and take the World Championship at the Great American Bash. I want it all. I want my entire kingdom to rejoice in my royal splendor. King Booker will soon be King of the world.

— King Booker commenting on his future World Championship match against Rey Mysterio

The following week, on SmackDown!, Mysterio faced off against William Regal, a member of King Booker's Court. King Booker, who was providing commentary for the match, attempted to interfere and attack Mysterio. Mysterio, however, attacked King Booker and pinned Regal for the win. After the match, Mysterio executed a 619 and a seated senton on King Booker. On the July 21 episode of SmackDown!, Mysterio defeated King Booker in a non-title match. Mysterio pinned King Booker after a 619 following interference from Chavo Guerrero.

Another primary feud heading into the event was between The Great Khali and The Undertaker. At the previous SmackDown! brand pay-per-view event, Judgment Day, Khali defeated The Undertaker. One month later, on the edition of June 30 of SmackDown!, Khali challenged Undertaker to a Punjabi Prison match at The Great American Bash. The following week, Undertaker accepted Khali's challenge.

Great Khali, you dare challenge me. There's an old saying that says you should quit while you're ahead. At The Great American Bash, I will face you in your Punjabi Prison match, and you will, Rest in Peace.

— Undertaker accepting The Great Khali's challenge to a Punjabi Prison match at The Great American Bash.

== Event ==
Other on-screen personnel
Role:	Name:
English commentators	Michael Cole
English commentators	John "Bradshaw" Layfield
Spanish commentators	Hugo Savinovich
Spanish commentators	Carlos Cabrera
Interviewer	Mike Mizanin
Ring announcer	Tony Chimel
Referees	Charles Robinson
Referees	Nick Patrick
Referees	Chris Kay

Before the live broadcast of the event began, Funaki defeated Simon Dean in a dark match.

The first match of the event was Paul London and Brian Kendrick facing The Pit Bulls (Jamie Noble and Kid Kash) for the WWE Tag Team Championship. London and Kendrick controlled most of the match, as they performed a variety of double-team maneuvers. Kendrick pinned Noble with a sunset flip with a dropsault from London to win the match and retain the titles.

The next match saw Finlay defend the WWE United States Championship against William Regal. Prior to the match, General manager Theodore Long announced that Bobby Lashley, who was previously scheduled to be in the match, could not compete due to elevated enzymes in his liver. Finlay had the advantage throughout the match, as The Little Bastard attacked Regal numerous times. Finlay pinned Regal with his feet on the ropes after hitting him with Regal's boot, which had been taken off by the Little Bastard, to win the match and retain the title.

The third match was Gregory Helms versus Matt Hardy, who was substituting for Super Crazy, who was also suffering from elevated enzymes in his liver. The match went back and forth, as each man was able to gain the advantage. In the end, Helms pinned Hardy while holding onto his tights to win.

The match that followed was Big Show versus The Undertaker in the first-ever Punjabi Prison match. In order to win the match, one must escape both the inner and outer bamboo structures. On-screen, General Manager Theodore Long put Big Show in the match instead of The Great Khali for attacking The Undertaker backstage. In reality, Khali was not medically cleared to compete as, like Lashley and Super Crazy, he had elevated levels of enzymes in his liver. Both Big Show and The Undertaker managed to escape the inner structure. While fighting in the space between the two structures, The Undertaker jumped at the Big Show from the inner structure, breaking the outer structure. As The Undertaker's feet were declared to hit the floor first, he was declared the winner.

The following match was a Fatal Four-Way Bra and Panties match between Ashley Massaro, Kristal Marshall, Jillian Hall, and Michelle McCool. Massaro won the match after last stripping Kristal of her top. After the match, an upset Jillian confronts Ashley only for her suggest celebrating with her. As Jillian poses on the turnbuckle, Ashley pulls her pants off leading to Jillian playfully retaliating by taking off Ashley's skirt before the two continue celebrating before leaving the ring.

The sixth match was between Batista and Mr. Kennedy. During the match, Batista slammed Kennedy's head into the steel steps, which cut Kennedy and exposed his cranium. Kennedy won the match after Batista was disqualified for failing to release a choke he had applied on Kennedy. After the match, Kennedy received twenty stitches to close the cuts he received during the match.

The main event saw Rey Mysterio defend the World Championship against King Booker. In the end, Chavo Guerrero came out to supposedly help Mysterio. As Guerrero looked to hit King Booker with a steel chair, he turned on Mysterio and hit him with it instead. King Booker pinned Mysterio to win the title.

== Aftermath ==
Following The Great American Bash, a rematch between King Booker and Rey Mysterio for the World Championship—which went back to being called the World Heavyweight Championship—took place. The match saw King Booker retain the World Heavyweight Championship, after interference from Chavo Guerrero. On the August 4 episode of SmackDown!, in a scheduled match, Batista defeated Mr. Kennedy. SmackDown! commentator Michael Cole congratulated Batista on his win. Batista informed Cole to save his congratulations until after he won back the World Heavyweight Championship. The following week, Batista thanked King Booker for holding onto "his" World Heavyweight Championship and told him he would be needing it back at SummerSlam. At SummerSlam, Batista defeated King Booker by disqualification after Queen Sharmell interfered.

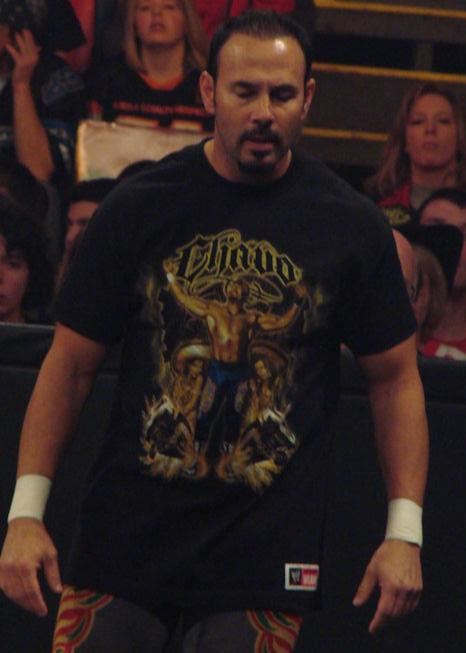
Chavo Guerrero, who began a storyline with Rey Mysterio following the event.

Following Chavo Guerrero's interference in Rey Mysterio's World Heavyweight Championship match with King Booker, Guerrero and Mysterio began a storyline with one another, which would last for three months. The following week, Guerrero explained why he attacked Mysterio at The Great American Bash. He claimed Mysterio was a leech living of the Guerrero family name, and that he was using that to elevate his career.

Rey Mysterio betrayed me. Rey Mysterio is a thief. Let me tell you what he stole. He tried to steal the spotlight, my spotlight. He did everything he could to tie himself to Eddie Guerrero because Rey couldn't stand on his own two feet. I saved you from losing your title over and over. He used the Guerrero name... I'm the Guerrero, Rey—not you. Rey, you didn't just steal Eddie from me, you didn't just steal him from the Guerrero family, you stole the memory of Eddie from each and every one of those people out there. You're nothing but a leech living off the blood of the Guerrero name.

— Chavo Guerrero explaining why he attacked Rey Mysterio at The Great American Bash.

Two weeks later, on the August 18 episode of SmackDown!, General Manager Theodore Long announced that Mysterio and Guerrero would face off against one another at SummerSlam. Guerrero won the match after executing a frog splash following interference from Vickie Guerrero.

A rivalry between Matt Hardy and Gregory Helms began after facing off at the Great American Bash. On August 25, on SmackDown!, Helms interfered in a match between Mr. Kennedy and Hardy, in which Kennedy won. The following week, Hardy and Helms met in a non-title match, in which Hardy won. The two continued their feud over the following months, including a match at No Mercy won by Hardy.

The Undertaker and The Great Khali would continue to feud until the August 18 episode of SmackDown!, where Undertaker defeated Khali in a Last Man Standing match.

This was the last brand-exclusive Great American Bash during the first brand split period (2002–2011), as following WrestleMania 23 in April 2007, brand-exclusive PPVs were discontinued. There would not be another brand-exclusive Great American Bash event until 2020 during the second brand split period that began in 2016, with The Great American Bash becoming an exclusive annual event for WWE's developmental brand, NXT.

== Results ==
No.	Results	Stipulations	Times
1^{D}	Funaki defeated Simon Dean	Singles match	—
2	Paul London and Brian Kendrick (c) defeated The Pit Bulls (Jamie Noble and Kid Kash)	Tag team match for the WWE Tag Team Championship	13:40
3	Finlay (c) defeated William Regal	Singles match for the WWE United States Championship	13:49
4	Gregory Helms defeated Matt Hardy	Singles match	11:43
5	The Undertaker defeated Big Show	Punjabi Prison match	21:35
6	Ashley defeated Kristal Marshall, Jillian Hall and Michelle McCool	Fatal 4-Way Bra and Panties match	8:17
7	Mr. Kennedy defeated Batista by disqualification	Singles match	8:38
8	King Booker (with Queen Sharmell) defeated Rey Mysterio (c)	Singles match for the World Championship	16:46
(c) / – the champion(s) heading into the match; D / – this was a dark match
