= Rigau =

Rigau is a surname of Catalan-language origin. Notable people with the surname include:

- Alfredo Rigau (born 1960), Spanish sailor
- Carme García Rigau (born 1974), Spanish para-alpine skier and journalist
- Félix Rigau Carrera (1894–1954), Puerto Rican pilot
- Irene Rigau, Catalan nationalist politician
- Jorge Rigau (born 1953), Puerto Rican architect and author
- Marco Antonio Rigau (born 1946), Puerto Rican politician and attorney
- Marco Rigau Gaztambide (1919–1985), Puerto Rican lawyer

== See also ==
- Rīgāu, village in Rudkhaneh District, Hormozgan Province, Iran
