= Gabsi =

Gabsi is a surname, and may refer to:

- Hassen Gabsi, Tunisian footballer and manager
- Rania Gabsi, Tunisian actress

== See also ==
- Gabs
