= The Great American Bash (2007) =

World Wrestling Entertainment pay-per-view event

- Promotional poster featuring Rey Mysterio
- Promotion: World Wrestling Entertainment
- Brand(s): Raw; SmackDown! ECW
- Date: July 22, 2007
- City: San Jose, California
- Venue: HP Pavilion
- Attendance: 13,034
- Buy rate: 229,000

Pay-per-view chronology
← Previous; Vengeance: Night of Champions	Next → SummerSlam

The Great American Bash chronology
← Previous; 2006	Next → 2008

The 2007 Great American Bash was a professional wrestling pay-per-view (PPV) event produced by World Wrestling Entertainment (WWE). It was WWE's fourth annual Great American Bash and 18th overall. The event took place on July 22, 2007, from the HP Pavilion in San Jose, California and was held for wrestlers from the promotion's Raw, SmackDown!, and ECW brand divisions. This was WWE's first Great American Bash to include Raw and ECW, after the first three events were SmackDown!-exclusive, as WWE discontinued brand-exclusive PPVs after WrestleMania 23 in April.

The main match on the Raw brand was John Cena versus Bobby Lashley for the WWE Championship, which Cena won by pinfall after executing an FU on Lashley from the second rope. The predominant match on the SmackDown! brand was a triple threat match for the World Heavyweight Championship between The Great Khali, Batista, and Kane. Khali won the match and retained the title after pinning Kane. The primary match on the ECW brand was John Morrison versus CM Punk for the ECW World Championship, which Morrison won by pinfall after hitting Punk with both of his knees. The featured matches on the undercard included Montel Vontavious Porter (MVP) versus Matt Hardy for SmackDown!'s WWE United States Championship and Randy Orton versus Dusty Rhodes in a Texas Bullrope match, which was Rhodes's final match. The event had 229,000 buys, up slightly on the 2006 figure of 227,000 buys.

== Production ==
=== Background ===
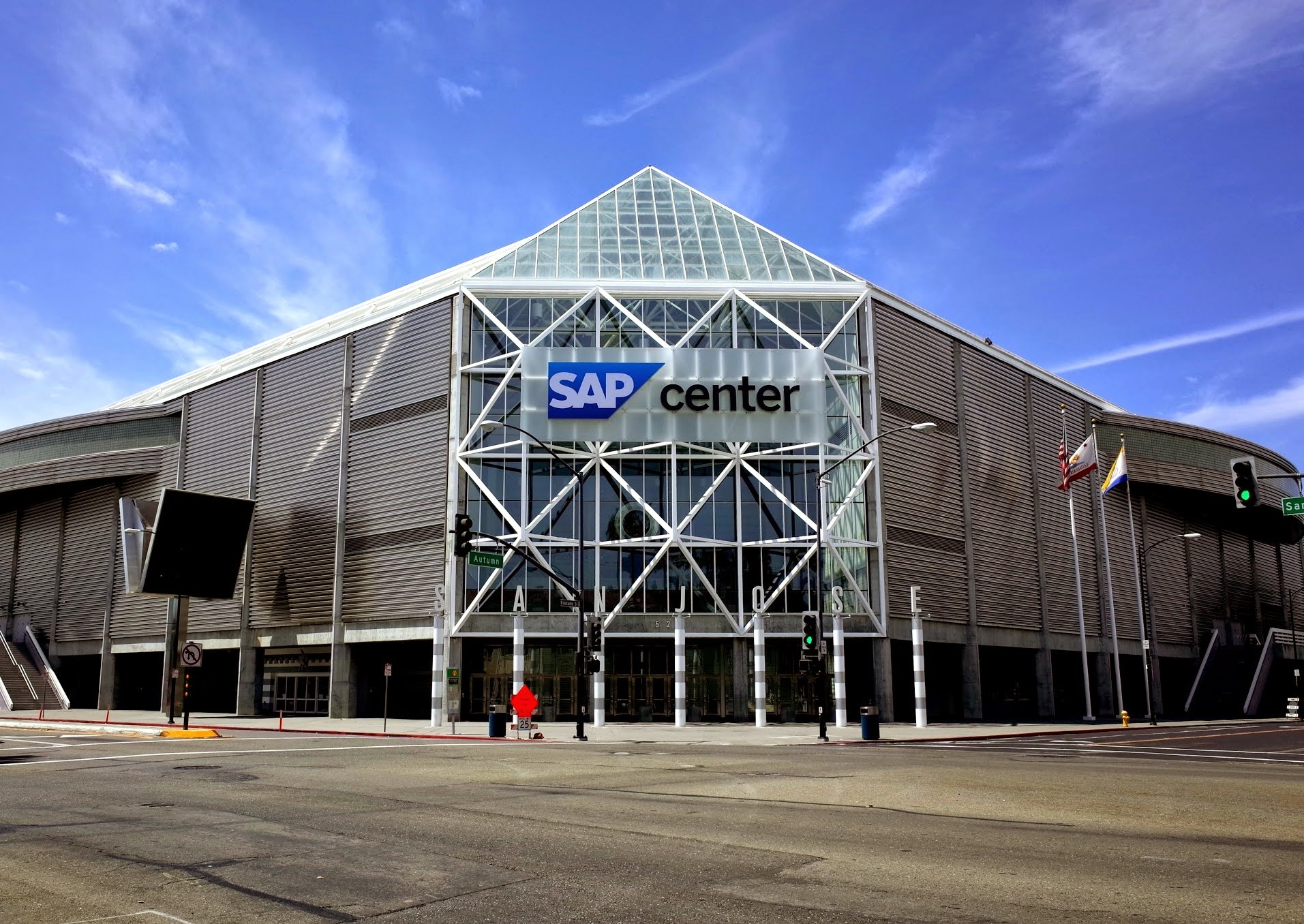
WWE's fourth annual Great American Bash was held at the HP Pavilion in San Jose, California.

The Great American Bash is a professional wrestling event established in 1985, held during the summer. Following World Wrestling Entertainment's (WWE) acquisition of World Championship Wrestling (WCW) in March 2001, WWE revived The Great American Bash as its own annual pay-per-view (PPV) event in 2004. WWE's fourth annual Great American Bash, and 18th overall, took place on July 22, 2007, from the HP Pavilion in San Jose, California. While the previous three years's events featured wrestlers exclusively from the SmackDown! brand, the 2007 event featured wrestlers from the Raw, SmackDown!, and ECW brands, as following WrestleMania 23 in April, WWE discontinued brand-exclusive PPVs, thus making this the first Great American Bash to include Raw and ECW.

=== Storylines ===
The main feud heading into The Great American Bash on the Raw brand was between John Cena and Bobby Lashley over the WWE Championship. The feud began on the June 11 episode of Raw, when Lashley was drafted to the Raw brand and stripped of his ECW Championship. Three weeks later on the July 2 episode, a "Beat the Clock" tournament was held to determine Cena's opponent for the WWE Championship at The Great American Bash. The tournament matches included: Randy Orton versus Jeff Hardy, King Booker versus Val Venis, Mr. Kennedy versus Super Crazy, and Lashley versus Shelton Benjamin. Lashley ended up winning the tournament by defeating Benjamin in less than 5 minutes and therefore becoming the number one contender to the WWE Championship.

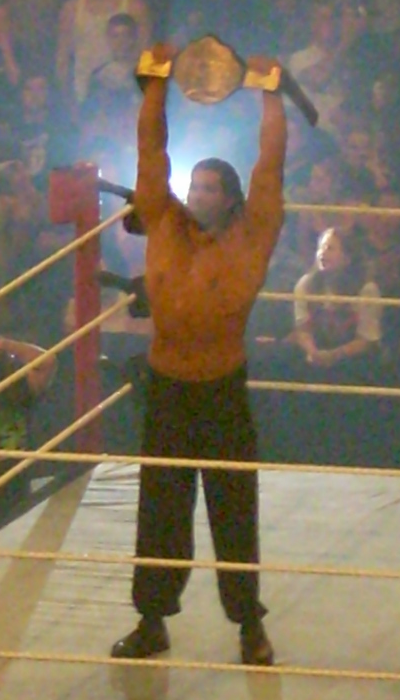
The Great Khali as SmackDown!'s World Heavyweight Champion

The main feud on the SmackDown! brand was between The Great Khali, Batista, and Kane, with the three battling over the World Heavyweight Championship. At the previous pay-per-view, Vengeance: Night of Champions, then-World Heavyweight Champion Edge defeated Batista in a Last Chance match to retain the World Heavyweight Championship. On the July 6 episode of SmackDown!, SmackDown! General Manager Theodore Long announced that Edge would be defending the World Heavyweight Championship against Kane at The Great American Bash. The next week, The Great Khali issued an open challenge for a match at The Great American Bash, which was accepted by Batista. Later that night, Edge legitimately injured his left pectoral muscle after Kane, who was disguised as a character, attacked Edge during his Mardi Gras celebration. On the July 20 episode, Edge was forced to vacate the World Heavyweight Championship due to a legit injury. Theodore Long then announced that there would be a 20-man Battle Royal later that night to determine a new World Heavyweight Champion. Khali ended up winning the Battle Royal by last eliminating Kane and Batista. That same night, Kane faced off against Batista to determine Khali's opponent for The Great American Bash, which ended in a no-contest after Khali interfered. Long finalized that both Kane and Batista would face Khali for the championship at The Great American Bash.

The main feud on the ECW brand was between John Morrison and CM Punk with the two battling over the ECW World Championship. At Vengeance, Morrison (then known as Johnny Nitro) defeated Punk to win the ECW World Championship, which was vacant since then-champion Bobby Lashley had been drafted to the Raw brand. Nitro was a replacement for Chris Benoit, who was absent due to "personal reasons". On the June 26 episode of ECW, Punk defeated Elijah Burke in a two out of three falls match to once again become the number one contender to the ECW World Championship.

== Event ==
Other on-screen personnel
Role:	Name:
English commentators	Jim Ross (Raw)
English commentators	Jerry Lawler (Raw)
English commentators	Michael Cole (SmackDown!)
English commentators	John "Bradshaw" Layfield (SmackDown!)
English commentators	Joey Styles (ECW)
English commentators	Tazz (ECW)
Spanish commentators	Carlos Cabrera
Spanish commentators	Hugo Savinovich
Interviewer	Todd Grisham
Ring announcer	Lilian Garcia (Raw)
Ring announcer	Justin Roberts (ECW)
Ring announcer	Tony Chimel (SmackDown)
Referees	Charles Robinson
Referees	Mike Chioda
Referees	John Cone
Referees	Jack Doan
Referees	Mickie Henson
Referees	Chad Patton
Referees	Scott Armstrong
Referees	Marty Elias

Before the event started, Chuck Palumbo defeated Chris Masters in a dark match.

=== Preliminary matches ===
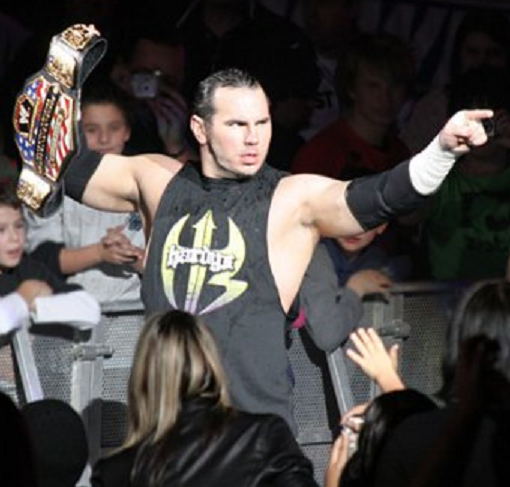
Matt Hardy, who challenged Montel Vontavious Porter for SmackDown!'s WWE United States Championship

The first match of the event was between Montel Vontavious Porter (MVP) and Matt Hardy for the WWE United States Championship. Hardy was in control early in the match but later MVP took control of the match and focused his attacks on Hardy's head. MVP performed a Playmaker on Hardy and pinned him to win the match and retain the United States Championship.

The second match was a Cruiserweight Open match for the WWE Cruiserweight Championship. Chavo Guerrero defended the title against Funaki, Jimmy Wang Yang, Shannon Moore and Jamie Noble. Hornswoggle, who wasn't booked to be in the match, became a part of the match when he entered the ring as the bell rang. All the cruiserweights were out of the ring except Noble. Hornswoggle, who was under the ring for the match, entered and surprisingly and performed a Tadpole Splash on Noble. Hornswoggle went on to pin Noble to get the victory and win the Cruiserweight Championship.

The third match was a Singapore Cane on a Pole match between Carlito and Sandman. The rules of the match were that the one who retrieved the cane from the pole was allowed to use the cane. Sandman retrieved the cane, but before he could use it, Carlito performed a Backstabber and pinned him to win the match.

The fourth match was a Divas match between Candice Michelle and Melina for the WWE Women's Championship. After a back and forth match, Candice performed a Candy Wrapper on Melina, and pinned her after to retain the title.

The fifth match was between Umaga and Jeff Hardy for the WWE Intercontinental Championship. Hardy started the match attacking Umaga with moves such as dropkicks, inverted mule kicks and a Whisper in the Wind. Hardy had a chance to make the cover, but instead attempted to perform a Swanton Bomb. Umaga avoided the move and charged Hardy in the corner. Umaga then performed a Samoan Spike and pinned Hardy after to win the match.

The sixth match was between John Morrison and CM Punk for the ECW World Championship. Morrison left the match, but Punk chased, tackled, and pushed him to the ring. Before Punk could attempt a springboard clothesline, Morrison raised his knee. Morrison pinned Punk after to win the match and retain the ECW World Championship.

=== Main event matches ===
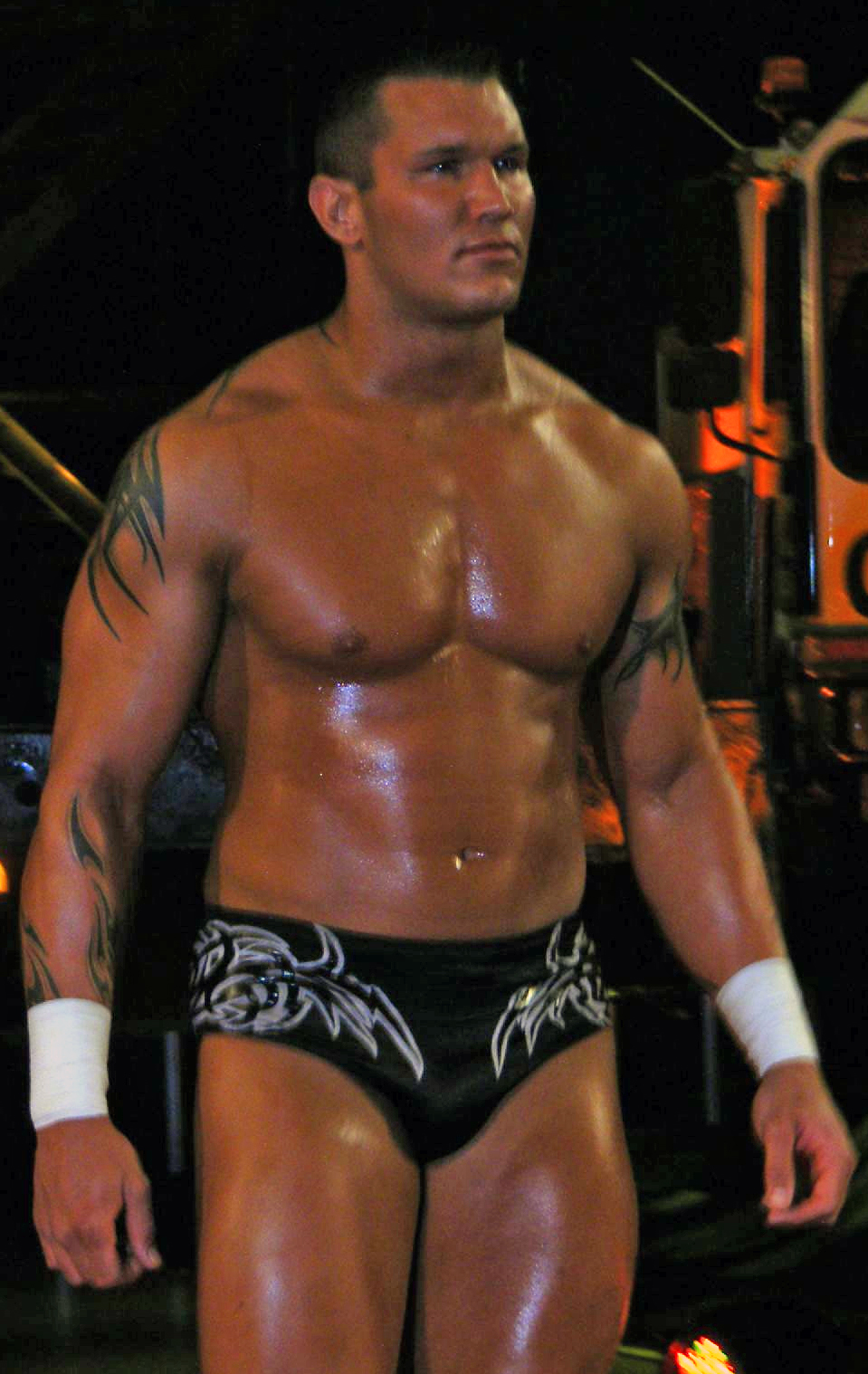
Randy Orton, who faced Dusty Rhodes in a Texas Bullrope match

The seventh match was a Texas Bullrope match between Randy Orton and Dusty Rhodes. Rhodes started the match by performing a series of elbows on Orton's head. Orton, however, took the advantage after hitting Rhodes' head several times with the cowbell, which was in the middle of the rope connecting the two men. After a final hit to the head, Orton pinned Rhodes to win the match. After the match, Orton attempted to punt Rhodes in the head, but Rhodes' son, Cody, made the save.

The eighth match was a triple threat match for the World Heavyweight Championship between then World Heavyweight Champion The Great Khali, Batista, and Kane. In the beginning, Khali dominated most of the match, applying a nerve hold on Kane and attacking Batista. Outside the ring, they both tried to perform their separate finishers on Khali, who countered both attempts. Batista and Kane performed a double-team spinebuster and chokeslam through a broadcast table. Kane performed a Chokeslam on Batista for a near-fall. Kane then retrieved a steel chair, but Batista countered a chair shot with a Spinebuster, and then performed a Batista Bomb on Kane. As Batista went for the pinfall, Khali pulled Batista outside the ring and threw Batista into the steel steps. Khali executed a Khali Bomb on Kane to win the match and retain the title.

The main event was between John Cena and Bobby Lashley for the WWE Championship. In the beginning, Lashley performed a series of powerslams on Cena. Cena applied the STF on Lashley, who escaped. Cena performed an FU on Lashley for a delayed near-fall. Lashley performed a Spear on Cena for a near-fall. Cena performed a Super FU to retain the title. After the match, Cena and Lashley shook hands.

== Aftermath ==
Montel Vontavious Porter (MVP) and Matt Hardy continued their feud over the WWE United States Championship. Hardy defeated MVP in an arm wrestling contest on the August 3 edition of SmackDown!. On August 18 Saturday Night's Main Event XXXV, Evander Holyfield replaced MVP against Hardy in a boxing match, which Holyfield won. On the August 24 episode of SmackDown!, the two had a basketball challenge which was no contest because they were attacked by Deuce 'n Domino. At SummerSlam, "Stone Cold" Steve Austin replaced Hardy in a Beer Drinking Contest against MVP which was a no contest because Austin delivered a Stone Cold Stunner to MVP.

John Morrison and CM Punk continued to feud over the ECW Championship. On the July 31 episode of ECW, Punk defeated Elijah Burke and Tommy Dreamer in a triple threat match to earn a 15 Minutes of Fame match with Morrison the next week. On ECW the following week, Punk defeated Morrison in the 15 Minutes of Fame match he earned the previous week. As a result of winning, Punk became the number one contender to the ECW Championship at SummerSlam. At SummerSlam, Morrison defeated Punk to retain the ECW Championship.

On the July 27 episode of SmackDown!, The Great Khali had his Championship Celebration which was interrupted by Batista. After Khali fled from the ring, Batista announced that he had challenged Khali to a match for the World Heavyweight Championship. At SummerSlam, the two faced each other for the World Heavyweight Championship in a match which Batista won by disqualification after Khali hit him with a chair. Since a championship cannot change hands via countout or disqualification, Khali retained the title.

On the July 23 episode of Raw, John Cena teamed with Candice Michelle in a 3-on-2 handicap match against Umaga, Lance Cade and Trevor Murdoch. Cena and Candice went on to win the match. After the match, Randy Orton delivered an RKO to Cena. Orton was then made the number one contender to the WWE Championship. The two had a match at SummerSlam for the WWE Championship, which Cena won.

== Results ==
No.	Results	Stipulations	Times
1^{D}	Chuck Palumbo defeated Chris Masters	Singles match	—
2	Montel Vontavious Porter (c) defeated Matt Hardy	Singles match for the WWE United States Championship	12:55
3	Hornswoggle defeated Chavo Guerrero (c), Jimmy Wang Yang, Shannon Moore, Funaki and Jamie Noble	Cruiserweight Open for the WWE Cruiserweight Championship	6:59
4	Carlito defeated The Sandman by pinfall	Singapore Cane on a Pole match	5:31
5	Candice Michelle (c) defeated Melina	Singles match for the WWE Women's Championship	6:22
6	Umaga (c) defeated Jeff Hardy	Singles match for the WWE Intercontinental Championship	11:20
7	John Morrison (c) defeated CM Punk	Singles match for the ECW World Championship	7:50
8	Randy Orton defeated Dusty Rhodes	Texas Bullrope match	5:40
9	The Great Khali (c) defeated Batista and Kane	Triple threat match for the World Heavyweight Championship	10:04
10	John Cena (c) defeated Bobby Lashley	Singles match for the WWE Championship	14:52
(c) / – the champion(s) heading into the match; D / – this was a dark match
