= Gabb =

Gabb is a surname. Notable people with the surname include:

- David Baker-Gabb, Australian ornithologist
- George Gabb (1928–2007), Belizean artist, sculptor, writer and entertainer
- Harry Gabb (1909–1995), British musician
- Ken Gabb (born 1949), Australian politician
- Moses Gabb (1882–1951), Australian politician
- Sean Gabb (born 1960), English libertarian and conservative
- William More Gabb (1839–1878), American paleontologist

Gabb is also a forename. Notable people with the forename include:

- Gabb Skribikin (born 2002), Filipino actress

== See also ==
- Gabb's snail (Micrarionta gabbii), a species of gastropod in the family Helminthoglyptidae
- Gab (disambiguation)
