= NXT: The Great American Bash (2021) =

WWE television special

- Promotional poster featuring Adam Cole and Kyle O'Reilly
- Promotion: WWE
- Brand: NXT
- Date: July 6, 2021
- City: Orlando, Florida
- Venue: Capitol Wrestling Center at WWE Performance Center

NXT special episodes chronology
← Previous; New Year's Evil	Next → Halloween Havoc

The Great American Bash chronology
← Previous; 2020	Next → 2022

The 2021 NXT: The Great American Bash was a professional wrestling television special produced by WWE, held exclusively for wrestlers from the promotion's NXT brand division. It was NXT's second annual Great American Bash, the ninth produced by WWE, and the 23rd overall, and it aired as a special episode of the weekly series NXT on the USA Network. Unlike the previous year, which aired as a two-part special, the 2021 event was a one-night special that took place on July 6, 2021, at the Capitol Wrestling Center, a bio-secure bubble that was hosted at the WWE Performance Center in Orlando, Florida. Four matches were contested at the event. In the main event, Adam Cole defeated Kyle O'Reilly.

== Production ==
=== Background ===
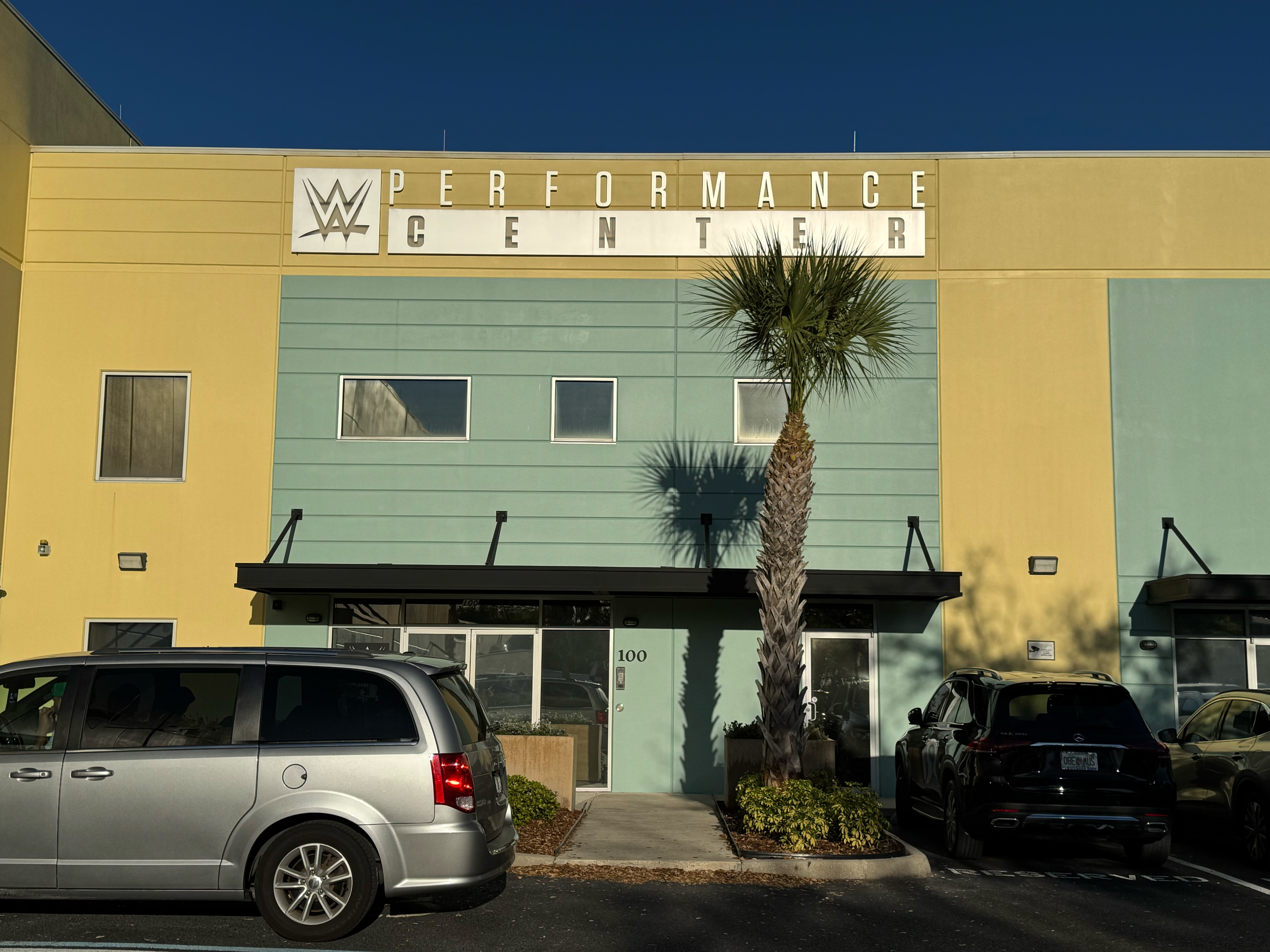
WWE's ninth Great American Bash, and second annual for NXT, was held at the Capitol Wrestling Center, a bio-secure bubble that was hosted at the WWE Performance Center in Orlando, Florida.

The Great American Bash is a professional wrestling event established in 1985, held during the summer. Following WWE's acquisition of World Championship Wrestling (WCW) in March 2001, WWE revived The Great American Bash as its own pay-per-view (PPV) event in 2004 and it was held annually until 2009. After the 2009 event, which was truncated as The Bash, it was discontinued until it was held once more as a television special of SmackDown in 2012, which returned to using the event's full name, after which, it was again discontinued. After eight years, WWE reinstated the event in 2020, this time for the NXT brand, which was held as a two-part television special of the NXT program.

On June 13, 2021, during TakeOver: In Your House, it was announced that the ninth Great American Bash produced by WWE, and 23rd overall, would return as a special episode of NXT on the USA Network, thus becoming an annual event for NXT. Instead of a two-night event like the previous year, it was only a one-night special held on July 6, 2021.

==== Impact of the COVID-19 pandemic ====
As a result of the COVID-19 pandemic that began affecting the industry in mid-March 2020, WWE had to present the majority of its programming from a behind closed doors set. NXT's programming was initially held at NXT's home venue at the time, Full Sail University in Winter Park, Florida. In October 2020, NXT's events were moved to the Capitol Wrestling Center, a bio-secure bubble that was hosted at the WWE Performance Center in Orlando, Florida. Like the WWE ThunderDome utilized for Raw and SmackDown's programming, LED boards were placed around the Performance Center so that fans could attend virtually, while additionally and unlike the ThunderDome, friends and family members of the wrestlers were in attendance along with a limited number of actual live fans divided from each other by plexiglass walls.

In April, fan capacity was increased at the Capitol Wrestling Center, and in June, WWE increased capacity further to nearly 300 spectators. Nearly all COVID-19 protocols were lifted, including physical distancing requirements and the requirement to wear masks, although anyone who had tested positive within the preceding 14 days were asked to stay home. The virtual audience was also removed with the increased live audience capacity.

=== Storylines ===
The card included matches that resulted from scripted storylines. Results were predetermined by WWE's writers on the NXT brand, while storylines were produced on WWE's weekly television show, NXT.

The main feud heading into The Great American Bash was the conflict between former Undisputed Era members Adam Cole and Kyle O'Reilly. At the end of TakeOver: Vengeance Day, Cole attacked O'Reilly, which would eventually lead to the breakup of The Undisputed Era. At Night 2 of TakeOver: Stand & Deliver, O'Reilly defeated Cole in an unsanctioned match. Cole returned on the June 1 episode of NXT, where he interrupted a triple threat match involving O'Reilly to determine the number one contender for the NXT Championship at TakeOver: In Your House. This turned the title match into a fatal five-way match, where both failed to win the title. On the following episode of NXT, the two brawled backstage, and NXT General Manager William Regal scheduled a rematch between the two for The Great American Bash.

At TakeOver: In Your House, LA Knight defeated Cameron Grimes to win the re-introduced Million Dollar Championship. On the following episode of NXT, Ted DiBiase presented the title to Knight, who then cut a promo about winning the title before turning on DiBiase, who was then saved by Grimes. In a video uploaded to WWE's YouTube channel, it was shown that Grimes had apologized to DiBiase following the match at TakeOver: In Your House. The following week, Knight talked about his attack on DiBiase while also disrespecting Grimes. On the June 29 episode, after Grimes's match, Knight confronted Grimes and called him a loser. Grimes then challenged Knight for the Million Dollar Championship. Knight accepted on the condition that if Grimes lost, Grimes would become Knight's butler. Grimes accepted the match for The Great American Bash.

On the June 8 episode of NXT, Io Shirai made her return and attacked The Way member and NXT Women's Tag Team Champion Candice LeRae while her partner Indi Hartwell watched on. The following week, LeRae interrupted Shirai, telling her that she should go to the back of the line. Hartwell then joined LeRae on attacking Shirai, who was then saved by Zoey Stark. After Shirai and Stark won their match on the June 22 episode, Dakota Kai and Raquel González wanted their own title shot. Ember Moon and Shotzi Blackheart then attacked Kai and González, and it was later announced that a triple threat tag team match between Kai and González, Moon and Blackheart, and Shirai and Stark would take place on the June 29 episode to determine the number one contenders for the NXT Women's Tag Team Championship at The Great American Bash, which was won by Shirai and Stark.

On the June 8 episode of NXT, Tommaso Ciampa and Timothy Thatcher were watching Grizzled Young Veterans (James Drake and Zack Gibson) win their match; both teams stated their claims for the NXT Tag Team Championship A tornado tag team match was then scheduled for the following week, which Ciampa and Thatcher won. This win earned them a title match against champions MSK (Wes Lee and Nash Carter) at The Great American Bash.

== Event ==
=== Preliminary matches ===
The television special began with MSK (Wes Lee and Nash Carter) defending the NXT Tag Team Championship against Tommaso Ciampa and Timothy Thatcher. During the match, MSK performed a Hot Fire Flame on Thatcher for a nearfall. Ciampa performed Project Ciampa on Lee for a nearfall. Lee countered a Fairytale ending into a bridged suplex for a nearfall. Carter escaped an Air Raid Crash attempt and performed a Cheeky Nandos on Ciampa. Carter performed a moonsault on Ciampa followed by a spiral tap by Lee, but Thatcher dragged Ciampa out of the ring to void the pin. Ciampa performed the Fairytale ending on Lee and Thatcher applied an ankle lock on Lee. Carter countered a Willow's bell attempt and sent Ciampa into Thatcher to void the submission. Lee then rolled up Thatcher to retain the titles.

Following this, NXT general manager William Regal talked about the issues between Johnny Gargano and NXT Champion Karrion Kross. After they argued, Regal booked a match between the two for the NXT Championship for the following week. Kross vowed to become a dominant champion, and Regal stated that the special guest referee for the title match would be Samoa Joe.

In the second match, LA Knight defended the Million Dollar Championship against Cameron Grimes under the stipulation that if Grimes lost, he would become Knight's butler. Grimes countered a slingshot move by Knight into a Superman Forearm for a nearfall. Knight performed a powerslam on Grimes for a nearfall. Grimes performed a Spanish Fly on Knight. The two then traded uppercuts. Grimes performed a Pendulum Side Slam on Knight for a nearfall. Knight performed a Burning Hammer on Grimes for a nearfall. Knight performed a superplex on Grimes for a nearfall. Knight grabbed the Million Dollar Championship, but the referee took it away. Afterwards, Grimes and Knight traded nearfalls. After kicking out a hurricanrana, Knight avoided a Cave In attempt by rolling out of the ring, where he performed a DDT on Grimes onto the title. After Grimes beat the count, Knight performed a Blunt Force Trauma on Grimes to retain the title, and make Grimes Knight's butler.

Following this, the participants for the 2021 NXT Breakout Tournament went to the NXT stage. They were Trey Baxter, Carmelo Hayes, Andre Chase, Josh Briggs, Ikemen Jiro, Joe Gacy, Odyssey Jones, and Duke Hudson. It was also announced that Jiro would take on Hudson in a first round match the following week.

In the third match, The Way (Indi Hartwell and Candice LeRae) defended the NXT Women's Tag Team Championship against Io Shirai and Zoey Stark. Shirai and Stark performed a double suplex on Hartwell for a nearfall. Stark performed a backslide pin for a nearfall. Shirai dominated once she tagged in. Later, LeRae applied the Gargano Escape on Shirai while Hartwell applied the Kata Gatame on Stark, but Shirai and Stark escaped. Hartwell distracted Shirai while the latter was attempting a moonsault. LeRae performed a German suplex on Shirai for a nearfall. After a few more nearfalls, the lights went out and the battery graphic appeared. Once it hit 100%, Tegan Nox appeared. Shirai sent LeRae out of the ring and Stark performed a Z-360 on Hartwell to win the titles. After the match, Nox sent LeRae retreating.

Before the main event, an in-ring segment took place which saw Hit Row (Top Dolla, B-Fab, Ashante "Thee" Adonis, and Isaiah "Swerve" Scott) celebrate Scott's NXT North American Championship win the previous week.

=== Main event ===
In the main event, Adam Cole faced Kyle O'Reilly. During the match, Cole avoided a Diving Knee attempt and performed a swinging neckbreaker on O'Reilly outside the ring. Inside, Cole performed a neckbreaker for a nearfall. After trading nearfalls, O'Reilly got fired up after Cole called his wife stupid. The two then traded forearms and strikes. Cole performed a chop block and struck O'Reilly in the jaw for a nearfall. O'Reilly avoided a Panama Sunrise attempt and performed a side Fisherman suplex on Cole for a nearfall. Cole performed a figure-four leglock on O'Reilly, who countered the move, only for Cole to reach the ropes to void the submission. Cole performed a Panama Sunrise, only for O'Reilly to place his foot on the rope. O'Reilly performed a brainbuster, only to miss on his diving knee attempt and Cole to perform a Last Shot for a nearfall. O'Reilly blocked a dive with his knee, but that only hurt him more. Cole took advantage with a Panama Sunrise and a second Last Shot to win the match.

== Aftermath ==
On the following episode of NXT, Kyle O'Reilly stated in an interview with Wade Barrett that despite his loss, he would end Adam Cole. After Cole won his match on the July 27 episode, O'Reilly viciously attacked Cole, ending the attack with a suplex on the steel steps. On the August 10 episode, Cole and O'Reilly had a face-to-face confrontation where they agreed to a two out of three falls match for TakeOver 36. O'Reilly picked a singles match for the first fall, Cole picked a street fight for the second, and William Regal picked a Steel Cage match for the final.

Also on NXT, Karrion Kross retained the NXT Championship against Adam Cole. After the match, Kross attacked Joe, who served as the special guest referee for the match. Eventually, Joe resigned as William Regal's enforcer, was reinstated as a member of the active roster, and was scheduled to face Kross for the title at TakeOver 36.

Ikemen Jiro and Duke Hudson had their first round match the following week where Hudson was victorious.

Tegan Nox's return to NXT at The Great American Bash would be her final NXT appearance, as she debuted on the main roster on the July 9 episode of SmackDown and formed a tag team with Shotzi Blackheart, who was also making her main roster debut.

Cameron Grimes and LA Knight continued their rivalry over the Million Dollar Championship, including Knight losing a match on the July 20 episode of NXT due to forcing Grimes to follow his orders. Ted DiBiase returned on the August 3 episode and encouraged Grimes to go for the title again. The following week, Knight agreed to defend the title against Grimes at TakeOver 36 under the stipulation that if Grimes lost, DiBiase would replace Grimes as Knight's butler. Although Grimes was against it, DiBiase agreed to the terms.

== Results ==
No.	Results	Stipulations	Times
1	MSK (Nash Carter and Wes Lee) (c) defeated Tommaso Ciampa and Timothy Thatcher by pinfall	Tag team match for the NXT Tag Team Championship	11:53
2	LA Knight (c) defeated Cameron Grimes by pinfall	Singles match for the Million Dollar Championship; Since Grimes lost, he became Knight's butler.	13:14
3	Io Shirai and Zoey Stark defeated The Way (Candice LeRae and Indi Hartwell) (c) by pinfall	Tag team match for the NXT Women's Tag Team Championship	7:58
4	Adam Cole defeated Kyle O'Reilly by pinfall	Singles match	20:33
(c) / – the champion(s) heading into the match
