= The Great American Bash (2005) =

World Wrestling Entertainment pay-per-view event

- Promotional poster featuring Torrie Wilson
- Promotion: World Wrestling Entertainment
- Brand: SmackDown!
- Date: July 24, 2005
- City: Buffalo, New York
- Venue: HSBC Arena
- Attendance: 8,000
- Buy rate: 233,000

Pay-per-view chronology
← Previous; Vengeance	Next → SummerSlam

The Great American Bash chronology
← Previous; 2004	Next → 2006

The 2005 Great American Bash was a professional wrestling pay-per-view (PPV) event produced by World Wrestling Entertainment (WWE). It was WWE's second annual Great American Bash and the 16th overall. The event took place on July 24, 2005, at the HSBC Arena in Buffalo, New York, held exclusively for wrestlers from the promotion's SmackDown! brand division.

The main event saw Batista defending the World Heavyweight Championship against John "Bradshaw" Layfield (JBL). JBL won the match after Batista was disqualified, but did not win the title because a championship can only be won via pinfall or submission unless otherwise stipulated. One of the featured matches on the undercard was Rey Mysterio versus Eddie Guerrero, which Mysterio won by pinfall. The other was Orlando Jordan versus Chris Benoit for the WWE United States Championship, which Jordan won, also by pinfall. The event was also notable for the final WWE appearance of Muhammad Hassan, who was involved in a controversial angle on a SmackDown! episode that aired on the same day of the London bombing attacks earlier that month.

The event grossed over US$375,000 in ticket sales from an attendance of 8,000, and received about 233,000 pay-per-view buys, the same amount as the following year's event. This enabled WWE's pay-per-view revenue to increase by $4.7 million from the previous year. When the 2005 event was released on DVD, it reached a peak position of second on Billboard's DVD Sales Chart. The event was also available free of charge for Armed Forces members and their families.

== Production ==
=== Background ===
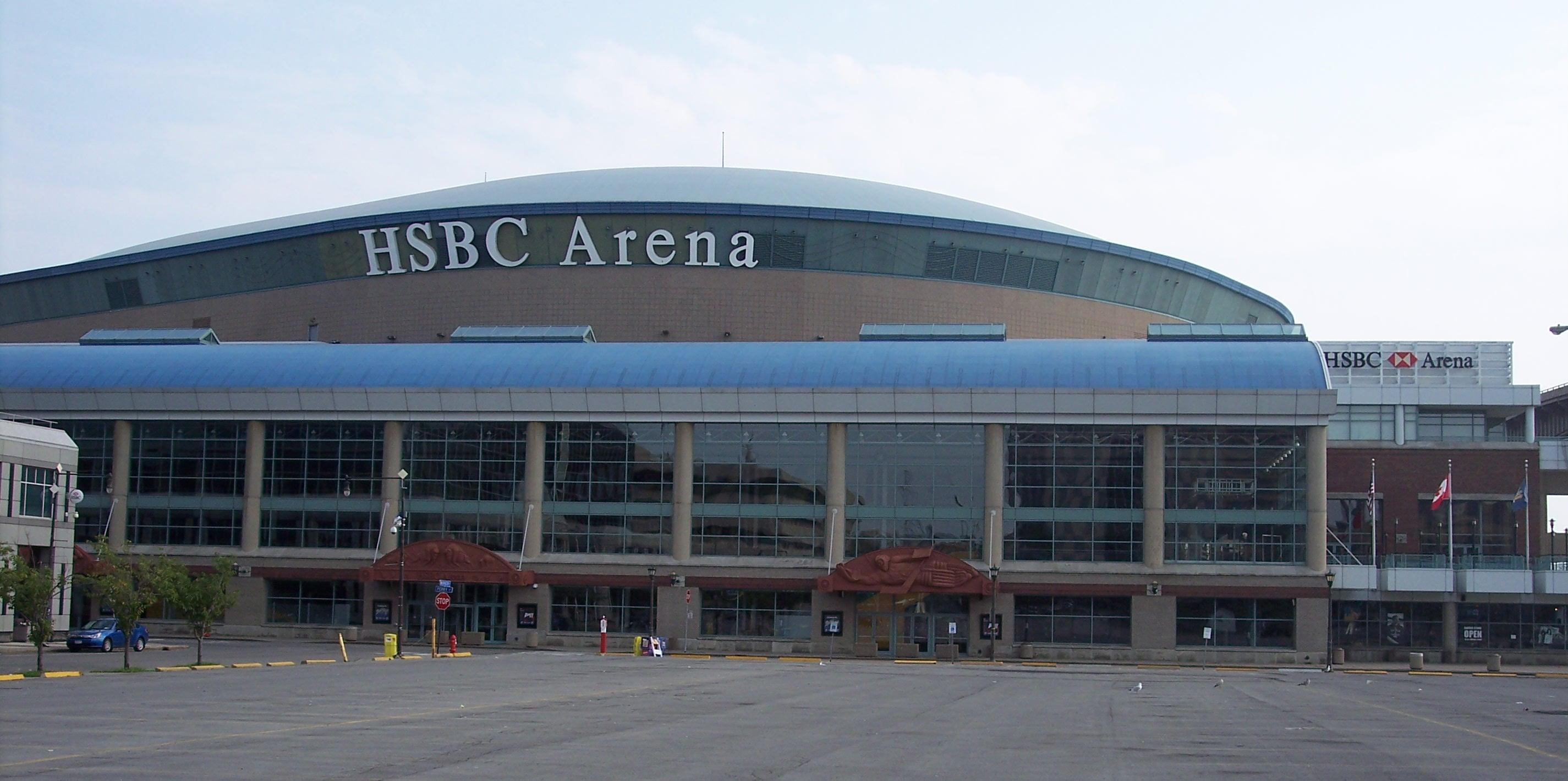
WWE's second annual Great American Bash was held at the HSBC Arena in Buffalo, New York

The Great American Bash is a professional wrestling event established in 1985, held during the summer. Following World Wrestling Entertainment's (WWE) acquisition of World Championship Wrestling (WCW) in March 2001, WWE revived The Great American Bash to be held as its own pay-per-view (PPV) event for the SmackDown! brand in 2004. The following year, WWE scheduled its second annual Great American Bash PPV event, and 16th overall, thus establishing it as an annual PPV event for the promotion. It took place on July 24, 2005, at the HSBC Arena in Buffalo, New York. Like the previous year, it featured wrestlers exclusively from the SmackDown! brand. The event was available free of charge for Armed Forces members and their families.

=== Storylines ===
The Great American Bash event featured a card, which contained matches that involved different wrestlers from pre-existing scripted feuds, plots and storylines. Results were predetermined by WWE's writers on the SmackDown! brand, while storylines were produced on WWE's weekly television show, SmackDown!.

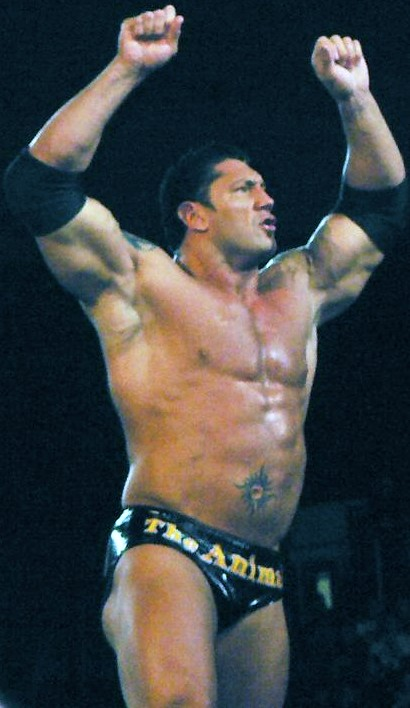
Batista defended the World Heavyweight Championship against John "Bradshaw" Layfield (JBL)

The main event at The Great American Bash was a standard wrestling match for the World Heavyweight Championship, in which Batista defended the championship against John "Bradshaw" Layfield (JBL). The buildup to the match began when John Cena, then the WWE Champion, was drafted to the Raw brand, taking the title with him and leaving SmackDown! without a world championship. SmackDown! general manager Theodore Long announced a match between six wrestlers for a new SmackDown! world championship. On the June 30 episode of SmackDown!, the match took place between JBL, Chris Benoit, Christian, Booker T, Muhammad Hassan, and The Undertaker. JBL was victorious in the match, but Long announced that he was not the champion. Instead, he had won the right to a match against the World Heavyweight Champion, Batista, who was SmackDown!'s final 2005 draft pick, making the World Heavyweight Championship exclusive to SmackDown!. On the July 14 episode of SmackDown!, Batista defeated Orlando Jordan in a singles match after performing a Batista Bomb. After the match, JBL successfully attacked Batista by executing a Clothesline From Hell. The following week on SmackDown!, JBL, who was accompanied by Jordan, threw himself a celebration party with the belief that he had already won the World Heavyweight Championship. Batista appeared, and as JBL fled the scene, performed a spinebuster on Jordan.

The event also featured a feud between Rey Mysterio and Eddie Guerrero. At the No Way Out event, Guerrero and Mysterio won the WWE Tag Team Championship from the Basham Brothers. After Guerrero and Mysterio lost the championship, Guerrero then began to portray a villainous character, turning on Mysterio in the process. At WrestleMania, Mysterio defeated Guerrero in a standard match. On the April 21 episode of SmackDown!, MNM (Johnny Nitro and Joey Mercury) defeated Mysterio and Guerrero to win the tag team championship. On the April 28 episode of SmackDown!, Guerrero and Mysterio faced MNM in a rematch for the title, but MNM retained them after pinning Mysterio for the win. At Judgment Day, Mysterio defeated Guerrero by disqualification, and on the June 30 episode of SmackDown!, the rivalry between Guerrero and Mysterio continued when Guerrero threatened to reveal a secret concerning Mysterio's son Dominik. Both the Mysterio and Guerrero families continued to beg Guerrero to not reveal the secret. A match was made between Mysterio and Guerrero for The Great American Bash, where if Mysterio won, Guerrero could not reveal the secret, but if Guerrero won, he would be able to reveal the secret on live television.

The third predominant feud prior to the event was between Chris Benoit and Orlando Jordan for the WWE United States Championship. On the July 7 edition of SmackDown!, Benoit defeated Booker T in a match to become the #1 contender for the title. Long granted Benoit a match against Jordan for The Great American Bash.

== Event ==
Before the pay-per-view went live, a match took place on the Sunday Night Heat pre-show between Paul London and Nunzio for the WWE Cruiserweight Championship, which London won to retain the title.

Other on-screen personnel
Role:	Name:
English commentators	Michael Cole
English commentators	Tazz
Spanish commentators	Carlos Cabrera
Spanish commentators	Hugo Savinovich
Interviewers	Josh Mathews
Interviewers	Steve Romero
Ring announcer	Tony Chimel
Referees	Nick Patrick
Referees	Charles Robinson
Referees	Brian Hebner
Referees	Jim Korderas

=== Preliminary matches ===
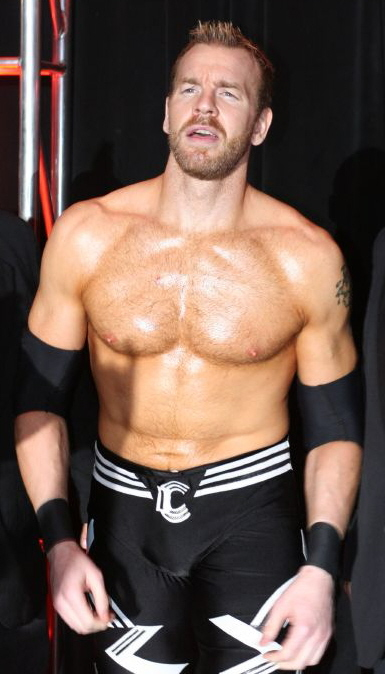
Christian faced Booker T at The Great American Bash

The first match on the card was between MNM (Johnny Nitro and Joey Mercury, managed by Melina) and The Legion of Doom (Heidenreich and Road Warrior Animal) for the WWE Tag Team Championship. During the match, Nitro hit Animal with one of the championship belts, but Animal retaliated by powerslamming him. Animal and Heidenreich then performed the doomsday device on Nitro and scored the pin to win the match and the titles.

The next match was between Booker T (managed by Sharmell) and Christian. Booker T won the match after performing a scissors kick.

In the next match, Orlando Jordan faced Chris Benoit for the United States Championship. During the match, Jordan removed the top turnbuckle pad. Benoit attempted to slam Jordan but Jordan avoided the attack and instead forced Benoit to run into the exposed turnbuckle. Jordan scored the pin to win the match and retain the title.

The fourth match was between The Undertaker and Muhammad Hassan (managed by Daivari) to determine the #1 contender for the World Heavyweight Championship. During Hassan's entrance, he was accompanied by the same masked men who attacked The Undertaker on SmackDown! weeks prior. The masked men proceeded to interfere in the match, but The Undertaker retaliated and removed all of the masked men from the ring. Midway through the match, The Undertaker attempted to use a Tombstone piledriver on Hassan, but Hassan escaped the move and attempted a Clothesline. The Undertaker countered by chokeslamming Hassan and scored the pinfall on Hassan to win the match and become the #1 contender. Following this, The Undertaker executed a Last Ride through the stage floor on Hassan, writing him out of storylines.

The next match was between The Mexicools and The Blue World Order in a six-man tag team match. At the match's end, Super Crazy executed a moonsault onto Big Stevie Cool from the top ring rope, and Psicosis performed a leg drop. Psicosis proceeded to pin Big Stevie and win the match for his team.

=== Main event matches ===
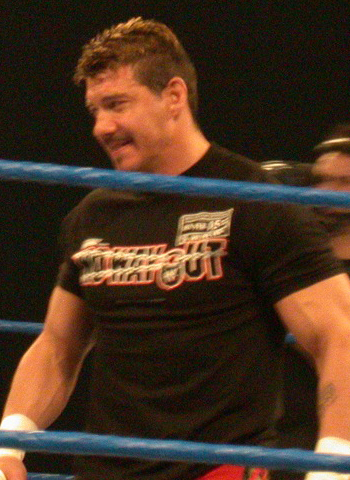
Eddie Guerrero faced Rey Mysterio at The Great American Bash.

The following match was between Rey Mysterio and Eddie Guerrero, where the stipulation was that if Guerrero won the match, he would reveal the secret he has been hiding from the public that neither Mysterio's nor Guerrero's families wanted revealed. If Mysterio won, however, Guerrero would not reveal the secret. Guerrero executed the Three Amigos on Mysterio and performed a frog splash. Guerrero then tried to score the pinfall, but Mysterio countered by pinning Guerrero to win the match. As a result, Guerrero was not able to reveal the secret.

The seventh match was between Melina and Torrie Wilson with Candice Michelle, as the guest referee, in a Bra and Panties match. At the start of the match, Wilson pulled off Melina's shirt to reveal her bra, but Melina retaliated and pulled off Wilson's shirt. Wilson then lifted Melina to her shoulders and dropped her to the mat, while she attempted to pull off her pants, but Melina countered the attack by pulling Wilson's pants off to win the match. Afterward, Michelle stripped Melina of her pants to reveal her panties and then removed her own clothes, as well.

The main event was between Batista and John "Bradshaw" Layfield (JBL) for the World Heavyweight Championship. Orlando Jordan interfered by attempting to hit Batista with a folding chair, but Batista grabbed the chair from him. Batista then used the chair to hit Jordan and JBL, and JBL was declared the winner, via disqualification. In WWE, a title cannot be won by disqualification, but only by pinfall or submission (the normal scoring conditions in professional wrestling matches). As a result, Batista retained the title. After the match Batista gave JBL and Jordan a Batista Bomb.

== Reception ==
The HSBC Arena has a maximum capacity of 18,690, but it was reduced for The Great American Bash. The event grossed over $375,000 in ticket sales from an attendance of 8,000, the maximum allowed. The event resulted in 233,000 pay-per-view buys, which was the same amount as the following year's Great American Bash. The promotion's pay-per-view revenue was $21.6 million, greater than the previous year's revenue of $16.9 million. The event was widely criticized by fans and critics alike. Canadian Online Explorer's professional wrestling section rated the event a five out of ten. The World Heavyweight Championship main event match was rated three out of ten, and the match between Rey Mysterio and Eddie Guerrero received the highest match rating of eight out of ten.

The event was released on DVD on August 23, 2005, by Sony Music Entertainment. The DVD reached seventh on Billboard's DVD Sales Chart for recreational sports during the week of October 8, 2005, and it rose to the fourth spot the following week. It remained on the chart's "top ten" for four consecutive weeks, until the week of December 15, 2005, when it ranked thirteenth.

== Aftermath ==
The feud between Batista and John "Bradshaw" Layfield (JBL) continued after The Great American Bash. On the July 28 episode of SmackDown!, JBL defeated The Undertaker after interference from Randy Orton to become the number-one contender for the World Heavyweight Championship at SummerSlam. The following week on SmackDown!, Batista and JBL held an official contract signing, where it was announced that their match at SummerSlam would be a No Holds Barred match. At SummerSlam, Batista defeated JBL to retain the World Heavyweight Championship. The feud between the two ended when Batista defeated JBL in a Texas Bullrope match on the September 9 episode of SmackDown!.

On the edition of SmackDown! following The Great American Bash, Eddie Guerrero revealed the secret he had been keeping; he was Dominick's real father, not Rey Mysterio (was thought to be). At SummerSlam, Mysterio defeated Guerrero in a ladder match and gained complete custody of Dominik. On the September 9 episode of SmackDown!, Guerrero finally defeated Mysterio in a Steel Cage match to end the feud. Guerrero then began a feud with Batista when Guerrero was given a title match at No Mercy. Guerrero, however, died unexpectedly of heart failure on November 13, 2005. In 2006, Guerrero was inducted into the WWE Hall of Fame by Mysterio, his nephew Chavo Guerrero Jr., and Chris Benoit.

The feud between Chris Benoit and Orlando Jordan continued. At SummerSlam, Benoit defeated Jordan for the WWE United States Championship in a match that lasted 25.5 seconds. On the September 1 episode of SmackDown!, Benoit once again defeated Jordan for the title, but this time the match lasted 23.4 seconds. The following week on SmackDown!, Benoit defeated Jordan in another title match, where the match lasted 22.5 seconds.

== Results ==
No.	Results	Stipulations	Times
1^{H}	Paul London (c) defeated Nunzio by pinfall	Singles match for the WWE Cruiserweight Championship	2:35
2	The Legion of Doom (Animal and Heidenreich) defeated MNM (Joey Mercury and Johnny Nitro) (c) by pinfall	Tag team match for the WWE Tag Team Championship	6:46
3	Booker T defeated Christian by pinfall	Singles match	11:38
4	Orlando Jordan (c) defeated Chris Benoit by pinfall	Singles match for the WWE United States Championship	14:24
5	The Undertaker defeated Muhammad Hassan by pinfall	Singles match to determine the #1 contender for the World Heavyweight Championship	8:05
6	The Mexicools (Super Crazy, Juventud and Psicosis) defeated The bWo (Stevie Richards, The Blue Meanie and Nova) by pinfall	Six-man tag team match	4:53
7	Rey Mysterio defeated Eddie Guerrero by pinfall	Singles match Since Mysterio won, Eddie could not reveal the secret about Mysterio's son, Dominik, which Eddie would have done if he won.	15:39
8	Melina defeated Torrie Wilson	Bra and Panties match with Candice Michelle as special guest referee	3:52
9	John "Bradshaw" Layfield defeated Batista (c) by disqualification	Singles match for the World Heavyweight Championship	19:48
(c) / – the champion(s) heading into the match; H / – the match was broadcast prior to the pay-per-view on Sunday Night Heat
