= Greater Atlantic Bank =

Community bank in Reston, Virginia, US

- Type: Private
- Industry: Financial services
- Founded: May 27, 1887
- Defunct: December 4, 2009
- Fate: Closed by Office of Thrift Supervision; assets acquired by Sonabank
- Headquarters: Reston, Virginia, US
- Services: Banking
- Website: www.Gab.com at the Wayback Machine (archived March 2, 2000)

Greater Atlantic Bank (GAB) was an American community bank. The bank was founded in May 1887 and was closed in December 2009. It was the first bank failure of the Great Recession and was the first bank failure in Virginia since 1993.

On October 20, 2009, the bank had $203 million in assets and $179 million in deposits.

== History ==
Greater Atlantic Bank was founded on May 27, 1887 as the Greater Baltimore Savings and Loan Association.

On May 31, 1989, the Greater Baltimore Savings and Loan Association changed its name to Greater Atlantic Savings Bank and on April 20, 1998, the bank changed its name to Greater Atlantic Bank. On September 19, 1991, Greater Atlantic moved its headquarters from Baltimore, Maryland to Rockville, Maryland and on September 23, 1999, the bank moved its headquarters from Rockville, Maryland to Reston, Virginia.

On August 22, 2000, Greater Atlantic completed its acquisition of Dominion Savings Bank. On June 15, 2009, Greater Atlantic Financial Corp. agreed to purchase Greater Atlantic Bank. However, the deal fell through four times due to both companies not being able to secure approvals and conditions in order to complete the purchase.

On December 4, 2009, Greater Atlantic was closed by the Office of Thrift Supervision (OTS). Greater Atlantic's deposits were assumed by Sonabank and most of its assets were purchased by Sonabank. On December 5, 2009, all five of Greater Atlantic's former locations were reopened as branches of Sonabank and depositors of Greater Atlantic automatically became depositors of Sonabank. Sonabank entered into a loss-share agreement with the Federal Deposit Insurance Corporation (FDIC) on $145 million of Greater Atlantic's assets.
