= Carme García =

Spanish visually impaired para-alpine skier and sailor

Personal information
- Birth name: Carme García Rigau
- Nationality: Spanish
- Born: June 25, 1974 (age 50); Girona, Spain

Sport
- Country: Spain
- Sport: Para-alpine skiing
- Event(s): Downhill; Slalom; Giant slalom Super combined Super G
- Club: Club Siempre

Carme García Rigau (born 25 June 1974 in Girona) is a Spanish visually impaired B3 classified para-alpine skier, blind sailor and journalist. She represented Spain at the 2002 Winter Paralympics and 2006 Winter Paralympics in para-alpine, and did not medal in either Games appearance. In 2011, she participated in the International Association for Disabled Sailing International (IFDS) Championship where her boat finished sixth.

== Personal ==
García has a visual impairment, a condition she has had since birth.

García was born on 25 June 1974 in Girona, in the Catalan region of Spain. She moved to Vigo in Galicia in 2009 in order to live with her boyfriend. She has difficulties navigating the streets of Vigo because of several factors, including the occasional lack of streets with sidewalks.

García joined Organización Nacional de Ciegos Españoles (ONCE) when she was 19 years old. In 2008, her book Sueños Paralímpicos was published. She did a book launch in Almería. In 2009, she was studying music with a goal of making music a greater part of her life. This stemmed from her love of music, especially the styles of punk rock and heavy metal which she really enjoyed as a teenager.

García has a bachelor's degree in the Information Sciences, and is a journalist. For a while, she worked for Servimedia, the media branch of ONCE, but was unemployed in 2011 because of the difficulties of finding a job while competing at an elite level.

== Skiing ==
She is a visually impaired B3 classified skier. Her guide is Carles Vila. She started skiing in 1995, when she was 20 years old. She was encouraged to take up the sport by ONCE, and initially had problems finding a ski club to join because clubs were not equipped to deal with someone with a visual impairment. Starting out, she could only participate in ONCE organised events, which put her on the snow for a total of 8 to 10 days in a ski season. Her first major international competition was European Championship in 1999 where she earned three bronze medals.

García competed at the 2002 Winter Paralympics. Her best finish was a fifth. In all her other races, she had DNFs. She was the 2004 World Champion in women's visually impaired para-alpine skiing after winning an event at the Australian hosted World Championships. She competed at the 2006 Winter Paralympics. Her best finish was a fourth place. By 2009, she had earned two gold medals at the World Cup. In early 2009, she joined the newly formed Spanish ski club, Club Siempre. It was a club for skiers with visual impairments. In March 2009, she participated in the Spanish hosted club event, Campeonato Interautonómico de la Federación Española de Deportes para Ciegos where she earned a silver medal in the slalom event. At the 2010 Spanish national championships, she finished second in the super g with a time of 2.15.76. She participated in Spanish national team competition from 5 to 7 April 2010 in Vancouver. It was organised by the Federación Española de Deportes de Personas con Discapacidad Física (FEDDF), Federación Española de Deportes para Paralíticos Cerebrales (FEDPC) and Federación Española de Deportes para Ciegos (FEDC). She earned a medal in her group.

== Sailing ==
García is a member of the Club Náutico Un Mar sin Barreras. She competed in the Australian hosted 2011 International Association for Disabled Sailing (IFDS) International Championship, finishing sixth in a three-person boat with Manuel Gimeno and Federico Giner. The competition was her first international one, though her teammates had competed internationally before. Her selection for the boat occurred at the last minute after the original woman who was supposed to participate was unable to do so. Prior to leaving for Australia, she trained on a ria in Vigo and attended a conference with a member of the local government.

In 2011, García was working on sailing with the aim of qualifying for the 2016 Summer Paralympics. Her event was an exhibition sport at the 2012 Summer Paralympics in London.
