= The Great American Bash =

Professional wrestling event series

- NXT The Great American Bash 2024 logo
- Created by: Dusty Rhodes
- Promotions: National Wrestling Alliance: Jim Crockett Promotions (1985–1988); World Championship Wrestling (1989–1992, 1995–2000); WWE (2004–2009, 2012, 2020–present)
- Brands: SmackDown (2004–2009); Raw (2007–2009); ECW (2007–2009); NXT (2020–present)
- Other names: The Bash (2009)
- First event: 1985

The Great American Bash is a professional wrestling event held during the summer and has been produced by the American promotion WWE since 2004; since 2020, it has been held as an annual event for WWE's developmental brand, NXT. Created by Dusty Rhodes, the event was originally established in 1985 and was produced by the National Wrestling Alliance's (NWA) Jim Crockett Promotions (JCP). It originally aired on closed-circuit television until 1988 when it began broadcasting on pay-per-view (PPV), and later that same year, JCP was rebranded as World Championship Wrestling (WCW), which seceded from the NWA in January 1991.

In March 2001, the then-World Wrestling Federation (WWF) purchased WCW. In May 2002, the WWF was renamed to World Wrestling Entertainment (WWE) and the promotion revived The Great American Bash as their own annual PPV event in 2004. It was held exclusively for wrestlers from WWE's SmackDown brand from 2004 to 2006 before brand-exclusive PPVs were discontinued in April 2007. In 2009, WWE renamed the event as The Bash, which was also the final Great American Bash broadcast on PPV, as it was replaced by Fatal 4-Way in 2010.

The event returned for one-night only in July 2012 under its original full name and was held as a television special, airing as a special episode of SmackDown. In July 2020, the event was again revived and became an annual event for WWE's developmental brand, NXT. From 2020 to 2022 and in 2024, it aired as special episodes of NXT, while in 2023 and since 2025, it has aired as a premium live event on WWE's livestreaming platforms.

== History ==
The Great American Bash was invented by Dusty Rhodes, a prominent wrestler of the National Wrestling Alliance (NWA), who became a wrestler and booker of the NWA's Jim Crockett Promotions (JCP). The first Great American Bash event was held by JCP on July 6, 1985, in Charlotte, North Carolina at the American Legion Memorial Stadium. In 1986 and 1987, The Great American Bash was held as a series of events. It was broadcast on closed-circuit television until the 1988 event, when it began broadcasting on pay-per-view (PPV). In November that year, JCP was purchased by Turner Broadcasting System and JCP was rebranded as World Championship Wrestling (WCW).

WCW continued to produce The Great American Bash under the NWA banner until WCW seceded from the NWA in January 1991. As such, the 1991 event was the first Great American Bash produced by WCW alone. After the 1992 event, WCW did not hold the PPV again until 1995. It then continued annually until 2000. The 2000 event was the final Great American Bash held by WCW, as in March 2001, WCW was purchased by the World Wrestling Federation (WWF), which was renamed to World Wrestling Entertainment (WWE) in May 2002.

After a four-year hiatus, the event was revived by WWE in 2004. To coincide with the brand extension, where the promotion divided its roster into brands where wrestlers were exclusively assigned to perform, the 2004 event was held exclusively for the SmackDown! brand. It continued to be held exclusively for SmackDown! in 2005 and 2006. Following WrestleMania 23 in April 2007, brand-exclusive PPVs were discontinued, thus the events from 2007 to 2009 featured the Raw, SmackDown!, and ECW brands. In 2009, the event was renamed as The Bash. It would be the only held under this name, as well as the last broadcast on PPV, as the event was replaced by Fatal 4-Way in 2010.

In April 2011, WWE ceased using its full name with the WWE abbreviation becoming an orphaned initialism. The company then revived The Great American Bash once in July 2012 under the event's original full name, but it was held as a television special, airing as a special episode of SmackDown. After another eight years, WWE again revived the event, this time for its developmental brand, NXT, as a two-part special episode of NXT. The event was scheduled to again be held as a special episode of NXT in 2021, but reduced to one night, thus becoming an annual event for NXT. In 2023, the event was broadcast as a premium live event (PLE), marking the first Great American Bash to air on WWE's livestreaming platforms, notably Peacock in the United States and the WWE Network in most international markets. It returned to being a television special of NXT in 2024, but as a two-night event for the first time since 2020. It then returned as a one-night PLE in 2025.

Following the end of WWE's contract with Peacock in mid-March 2026 for NXT's events, and after NXT's previous PLE, Stand & Deliver, aired on YouTube in early April, later that month on April 28, WWE announced a new multi-year broadcasting deal for NXT's events in the United States in which 20 PLEs would air on The CW beginning with the 2026 Great American Bash; this expanded on an existing deal, as the weekly NXT program had been airing on the network since October 2024. Outside of the US, NXT's PLEs remained on Abema in Japan (until October 1 before switching to Netflix), SuperSport in Sub-Saharan Africa, and Netflix everywhere else.

== Events ==
WCW/nWo co-branded event	SmackDown-branded event	NXT-branded event

#	Event	Date	City	Venue	Final match	Ref.
National Wrestling Alliance: Jim Crockett Promotions
1	The Great American Bash (1985)	July 6, 1985	Charlotte, North Carolina	American Legion Memorial Stadium	Tully Blanchard (c) vs. Dusty Rhodes in a Steel cage match for the NWA World Television Championship	
2	The Great American Bash (1986)	July–August 1986	A tour of 13 shows around the south and eastern parts of the country		Dusty Rhodes vs. Ric Flair (c) for the NWA World Heavyweight Championship	
3	The Great American Bash (1987)	July 1987	A tour of several shows around the south and eastern parts of the country		The Road Warriors (Animal and Hawk), Dusty Rhodes, Nikita Koloff, and Paul Ellering vs. The Four Horsemen (Ric Flair, Arn Anderson, Lex Luger, and Tully Blanchard) and The War Machine in a WarGames match	
4	The Great American Bash (1988)	July 10, 1988	Baltimore, Maryland	Baltimore Arena	Ric Flair (c) vs. Lex Luger for the NWA World Heavyweight Championship	
National Wrestling Alliance: World Championship Wrestling
5	The Great American Bash (1989)	July 23, 1989	Baltimore, Maryland	Baltimore Arena	Ric Flair (c) vs. Terry Funk for the NWA World Heavyweight Championship	
6	The Great American Bash (1990)	July 7, 1990	Baltimore, Maryland	Baltimore Arena	Ric Flair (c) vs. Sting for the NWA World Heavyweight Championship	
World Championship Wrestling
7	The Great American Bash (1991)	July 14, 1991	Baltimore, Maryland	Baltimore Arena	Rick Steiner vs. Arn Anderson and Paul E. Dangerously in a handicap steel cage match	
8	The Great American Bash (1992)	July 12, 1992	Albany, Georgia	Albany Civic Center	Terry Gordy and "Dr. Death" Steve Williams vs. Dustin Rhodes and Barry Windham in a tournament final for the inaugural NWA World Tag Team Championship	
9	The Great American Bash (1995)	June 18, 1995	Dayton, Ohio	Hara Arena	Ric Flair vs. Randy Savage	
10	The Great American Bash (1996)	June 16, 1996	Baltimore, Maryland	Baltimore Arena	The Giant (c) vs. Lex Luger for the WCW World Heavyweight Championship	
11	The Great American Bash (1997)	June 15, 1997	Moline, Illinois	The MARK of the Quad Cities	Diamond Dallas Page vs. Randy Savage in a Falls Count Anywhere match	
12	The Great American Bash (1998)	June 14, 1998	Baltimore, Maryland	Baltimore Arena	Sting vs. The Giant for control of the WCW World Tag Team Championship	
13	The Great American Bash (1999)	June 13, 1999	Baltimore, Maryland	Baltimore Arena	Kevin Nash (c) vs. Randy Savage for the WCW World Heavyweight Championship	
14	The Great American Bash (2000)	June 11, 2000	Baltimore, Maryland	Baltimore Arena	Jeff Jarrett (c) vs. Kevin Nash for the WCW World Heavyweight Championship with Ernest Miller as the special guest enforcer	
World Wrestling Entertainment (WWE)
15	The Great American Bash (2004)	June 27, 2004	Norfolk, Virginia	Norfolk Scope	The Undertaker vs. The Dudley Boyz (Bubba Ray Dudley and D-Von Dudley) in a Handicap Concrete Crypt match	
16	The Great American Bash (2005)	July 24, 2005	Buffalo, New York	HSBC Arena	Batista (c) vs. John "Bradshaw" Layfield for the World Heavyweight Championship	
17	The Great American Bash (2006)	July 23, 2006	Indianapolis, Indiana	Conseco Fieldhouse	Rey Mysterio (c) vs. King Booker for the World Heavyweight Championship	
18	The Great American Bash (2007)	July 22, 2007	San Jose, California	HP Pavilion	John Cena (c) vs. Bobby Lashley for the WWE Championship	
19	The Great American Bash (2008)	July 20, 2008	Uniondale, New York	Nassau Veterans Memorial Coliseum	Triple H (c) vs. Edge for the WWE Championship	
20	The Bash	June 28, 2009	Sacramento, California	ARCO Arena	Randy Orton (c) vs. Triple H in a Three Stages of Hell match for the WWE Championship	
21	SuperSmackDown LIVE: The Great American Bash	July 3, 2012	Corpus Christi, Texas	American Bank Center	The Great American Bash 20-Man Battle Royal to determine the guest General Manager for the following week's SmackDown	
22	NXT: The Great American Bash (2020)	July 1, 2020 (Note: The event was taped on July 1 and aired on July 1 and 8.) (Night 1)	Winter Park, Florida	Full Sail University	Io Shirai vs. Sasha Banks	
22	NXT: The Great American Bash (2020)	July 8, 2020 (Night 2)	Winter Park, Florida	Full Sail University	NXT Champion Adam Cole vs. North American Champion Keith Lee in a Winner Takes All match	
23	NXT: The Great American Bash (2021)	July 6, 2021	Orlando, Florida	Capitol Wrestling Center at WWE Performance Center	Adam Cole vs. Kyle O'Reilly	
24	NXT: The Great American Bash (2022)	July 5, 2022	Orlando, Florida	WWE Performance Center	Bron Breakker (c) vs. Cameron Grimes for the NXT Championship	
25	NXT The Great American Bash (2023)	July 30, 2023	Cedar Park, Texas	H-E-B Center at Cedar Park	Carmelo Hayes (c) vs. Ilja Dragunov for the NXT Championship	
26	NXT: The Great American Bash (2024)	July 30, 2024	Orlando, Florida	WWE Performance Center	Roxanne Perez (c) vs. Thea Hail for the NXT Women's Championship	
26	NXT: The Great American Bash (2024)	August 6, 2024	Orlando, Florida	WWE Performance Center	Axiom and Nathan Frazer (c) vs. MSK (Wes Lee and Zachary Wentz) for the NXT Tag Team Championship	
27	NXT The Great American Bash (2025)	July 12, 2025	Atlanta, Georgia	Center Stage	Jordynne Grace and Blake Monroe vs. Fatal Influence (Jacy Jayne and Fallon Henley)	
28	NXT The Great American Bash (2026)	June 28, 2026	Orlando, Florida	WWE Performance Center	Lola Vice (c) vs. Kendal Grey for the NXT Women's Championship	
(c) – refers to the champion(s) going into the match

== 1985 ==
The Great American Bash
- Promotion: National Wrestling Alliance: Jim Crockett Promotions
- Date: July 6, 1985
- City: Charlotte, North Carolina
- Venue: American Legion Memorial Stadium
- Attendance: 27,000

The Great American Bash chronology
← Previous; First	Next → 1986

The 1985 Great American Bash was the inaugural Great American Bash professional wrestling event produced by the NWA's Jim Crockett Promotions. It took place on July 6, 1985, at the American Legion Memorial Stadium in Charlotte, North Carolina. The event included a 1-hour live concert performance by David Allan Coe.

As a result of Dusty Rhodes winning the match, Tully Blanchard's valet, Baby Doll was forced to be Dusty Rhodes' valet for 30 days which sparked her face turn as she became a full-time valet for Rhodes and his then partner, Magnum T. A.

After the event, Buzz Tyler left JCP after a dispute with booker Dusty Rhodes and took the NWA Mid-Atlantic Heavyweight Championship belt with him. The Russian Team would lose the NWA World Tag Team titles to the debuting Rock 'n' Roll Express three days later. Ric Flair would turn heel later in 1985 and join his (kayfabe) cousins Ole & Arn Anderson and break Dusty Rhodes' leg in a steel cage in September of that year, forcing him to surrender the NWA World Television title, and Flair/The Andersons would become the foundation of the Four Horsemen with Tully Blanchard and James J. Dillon joining in early 1986. Kamala would join the WWF later in 1985.

No.	Results	Stipulations
1	Ron Bass vs. Buddy Landel (with J. J. Dillon) ended in a draw	Singles match
2	The Andersons (Ole and Arn) (c) defeated Buzz Sawyer and Dick Slater	Tag team match for the NWA National Tag Team Championship
3	Manny Fernandez, Sam Houston, and Buzz Tyler defeated Superstar Billy Graham, Konga the Barbarian, and Abdullah the Butcher	Six-man tag team match
4	Jimmy Valiant defeated Paul Jones	Dog Collar match
5	The Russian Team (Krusher Khrushchev and Ivan Koloff) (c) vs. The Road Warriors (Hawk and Animal) (with Paul Ellering) ended in a double disqualification	Tag team match for the NWA World Tag Team Championship
6	Magnum T. A. (c) defeated Kamala (with Skandor Akbar) by disqualification	Singles match for the NWA United States Heavyweight Championship
7	Ric Flair (c) defeated Nikita Koloff (with Ivan Koloff)	Singles match for the NWA World Heavyweight Championship with David Crockett as special referee
8	Dusty Rhodes defeated Tully Blanchard (c) (with Baby Doll)	Steel Cage match for the NWA World Television Championship
(c) / – the champion(s) heading into the match

== 1986 ==
The Great American Bash
- Promotion: National Wrestling Alliance: Jim Crockett Promotions
- Date: July–August 1986
- City: various cities
- Venue: various venues
- Attendance: N/A
- Tagline: Ringmasters

The Great American Bash chronology
← Previous; 1985	Next → 1987

The 1986 Great American Bash was the second annual Great American Bash event produced by the NWA's Jim Crockett Promotions (JCP). Instead of a singular event, JCP used "The Great American Bash" name for a tour that had several pay-per-view caliber shows around the country in the summer of 1986. There were a total of 13 shows held under this Great American Bash tour and NWA World Heavyweight Champion Ric Flair defended his title at each one against Ricky Morton, Road Warrior Hawk, Ron Garvin, Nikita Koloff, Robert Gibson, Road Warrior Animal, Magnum T. A., Wahoo McDaniel, and Dusty Rhodes. Rhodes defeated him for the title at the July 26 event. Flair challenged Rhodes to a rematch on the last Bash on August 2. Nikita Koloff and Magnum T. A. were involved in a best of seven title match series throughout the Bash for the U.S. Title. The cities toured in 1986 were in order as follows: July 1 in Philadelphia, July 3 in Washington, D.C., July 4 in Memphis, Tennessee, July 5 in Charlotte, North Carolina, July 8 in Charleston, WV, July 9 in Cincinnati, July 10 in Roanoke, Virginia, July 12 in Jacksonville, Florida, July 18 in Richmond, Virginia, July 21 in Fayetteville, North Carolina, July 23 in Johnson City, Tennessee, July 25 in Norfolk, Virginia, July 26 in Greensboro, North Carolina, and August 2 in Atlanta.

In July 2019, the July 5 and July 26 editions were uploaded as hidden gems on the WWE Network.

Steve Regal won the NWA World Junior Heavyweight title from Denny Brown at the final Bash event in Atlanta, then lost it back to Brown a month later and joined the WWF shortly afterwards. Ric Flair regained the NWA World Heavyweight Title from Rhodes in St. Louis one week after the Bash tour ended, then Baby Doll left Dusty Rhodes and became Flair's valet until she was moved to the Central States territory after JCP's purchase later in 1986. Nikita Koloff won the United States Heavyweight title after defeating Magnum T. A. for the fourth time on August 17 in Charlotte, NC, then unified the United States title with the former Georgia National Heavyweight title by defeating champion Wahoo McDaniel in September 1986 (retiring the last of the former Georgia Championship Wrestling titles), then turned face after Magnum's career-ending car accident in October. Manny Fernandez turned on Jimmy Valiant (Valiant lost his hair later in the Bash tour) and become a heel, joining Paul Jones' army, later joining forces with Rick Rude. Ron Garvin won the Mid-Atlantic Title from Black Bart in September before vacating the title (which then was retired) after winning the United States Tag Team titles with his partner Barry Windham.

July 5, 1986 in Charlotte, North Carolina (Memorial Stadium)

No.	Results	Stipulations
1	Denny Brown (c) vs. Steve Regal ended in a draw	Singles match for the NWA World Junior Heavyweight Championship
2	Robert Gibson defeated Black Bart	Singles match
3	The Minnesota Wrecking Crew (Ole Anderson and Arn Anderson) defeated Sam Houston and Nelson Royal	Tag team match
4	Manny Fernandez defeated Baron von Raschke (with Paul Jones)	Bunkhouse match
5	Wahoo McDaniel defeated Jimmy Garvin (with Precious)	Indian Strap match
6	Ron Garvin defeated Tully Blanchard (with J. J. Dillon)	Taped Fist match
7	The Road Warriors (Animal and Hawk) (with Paul Ellering) defeated The Russian Team (Ivan Koloff and Nikita Koloff)	Russian Chain match
8	Jimmy Valiant defeated Shaska Whatley (with Paul Jones)	Hair vs. Hair match
9	Dusty Rhodes, Magnum T. A., and Baby Doll defeated The Midnight Express (Bobby Eaton and Dennis Condrey) and Jim Cornette	Steel cage match
10	Ric Flair (c) defeated Ricky Morton	Steel Cage match for the NWA World Heavyweight Championship
(c) / – the champion(s) heading into the match

July 26, 1986 in Greensboro, North Carolina (Greensboro Coliseum)

No.	Results	Stipulations
1	Steve Regal defeated Sam Houston	Singles match
2	Black Bart and Konga the Barbarian defeated Denny Brown and Italian Stallion	Tag team match
3	Manny Fernandez defeated Baron von Raschke (with Paul Jones)	Loaded Glove on a Pole match
4	Wahoo McDaniel defeated Jimmy Garvin (with Precious)	Indian Strap match
5	Tully Blanchard (with J. J. Dillon) defeated Ron Garvin	Taped Fist match
6	The Rock 'n' Roll Express (Ricky Morton and Robert Gibson) vs. The Minnesota Wrecking Crew (Ole Anderson and Arn Anderson) ended in a draw	Tag team match
7	Paul Jones (with Shaska Whatley) defeated Jimmy Valiant	Hair vs. Hair match
8	Magnum T. A. defeated Nikita Koloff (with Ivan Koloff)	Singles match for the vacant NWA United States Heavyweight Championship; Third in the best of seven series
9	The Road Warriors (Animal and Hawk) and Baby Doll (with Paul Ellering) defeated The Midnight Express (Bobby Eaton and Dennis Condrey) and Jim Cornette	Steel Cage match
10	Dusty Rhodes defeated Ric Flair (c)	Steel Cage match for the NWA World Heavyweight Championship
(c) / – the champion(s) heading into the match

== 1987 ==
The Great American Bash
- Promotion: National Wrestling Alliance: Jim Crockett Promotions
- Date: July 4, 1987; July 18, 1987; July 31, 1987
- City: Atlanta, Georgia; Charlotte, North Carolina; Miami, Florida
- Venue: The Omni; Memorial Stadium; Orange Bowl

The Great American Bash chronology
← Previous; 1986	Next → 1988

The 1987 Great American Bash was the third annual Great American Bash event produced by the NWA's Jim Crockett Promotions (JCP). Like the previous year, it was a series of events held throughout the summer of 1987, although this year's tour only had three events instead of 13. This was the first use of the WarGames: The Match Beyond match conceived by Dusty Rhodes.

Rhodes was on the winning side in both events along with The Road Warriors, Nikita Koloff, and Paul Ellering. Koloff, Rhodes, and J. J. Dillon sustained serious injuries in the first encounter, which led to him being replaced in the 2nd WarGames match in Miami by The War Machine. The Bash series took place in numerous venues all July long, starting in Lakeland, Florida at the Lakeland Civic Center Arena on July 1. This was also the final wrestling event of the NWA's JCP to be aired live on closed-circuit television, as JCP began airing their wrestling events live on pay-per-view, starting with Starrcade in November 1987.

This was the first major card that included the UWF stars after JCP purchased the UWF in April, 1987 as well as Championship Wrestling from Florida, as JCP took over operations of the promotion as well. Lazor-Tron (Hector Guerrero) would leave JCP later in 1987 and vacate the NWA World Junior Heavyweight Championship. The WWF national expansion continued as Big Bubba Rogers would leave later in 1987 to become the Big Boss Man, while other stars such as Chris Adams, Terry Gordy and Buddy Roberts would return to World Class (WCWA). Dark Journey would leave JCP after the Bashes and retire from wrestling. Manny "The Ragin' Bull" Fernandez would go onto a short feud with Jimmy Garvin before leaving JCP later in 1987. Tully Blanchard would lose his World TV title to Nikita Koloff, then he and Arn Anderson would form a tag team which captured the NWA World Tag Team titles (with a little unsolicited help from the Midnight Express) from the Rock 'n' Roll Express in September 1987. Dusty Rhodes would begin a feud with Lex Luger over the United States Heavyweight title. Jimmy Garvin's valet (and real-life wife) Precious would have her "dream date" with Ric Flair (which turned out to be Garvin's brother Ron Garvin in drag) and Ron Garvin would rekindle his feud with Ric Flair over the NWA World Heavyweight Championship, which Garvin would win in Detroit, Michigan, on September 25, 1987.

July 4, 1987 in Atlanta, Georgia (The Omni)

No.	Results	Stipulations
1	Kendall Windham defeated Gladiator #1	Singles match
2	Sting defeated Thunderfoot #1	Singles match
3	LazerTron defeated MOD Squad Spike	Singles match
4	Jimmy Valiant defeated MOD Squad Basher	Singles match
5	Barry Windham (c) defeated Rick Steiner	Singles match for the NWA Western States Heritage Championship
6	Ron Garvin and Jimmy Garvin (with Precious) defeated Vladimir Petrov and The Barbarian (with Paul Jones)	Tag team match
7	The Lightning Express (Tim Horner and Brad Armstrong) (c) defeated The Angel of Death and Big Bubba Rogers (with Skandor Akbar)	Tag team match for the UWF World Tag Team Championship
8	Chris Adams defeated Black Bart (with Skandor Akbar) by disqualification	Singles match
9	The Fabulous Freebirds (Buddy Roberts, Michael Hayes, and Terry Gordy) defeated Ivan Koloff, Manny Fernandez, and Paul Jones	Six-man tag team match
10	The Rock 'n' Roll Express (Ricky Morton and Robert Gibson) (c) defeated The Midnight Express (Bobby Eaton and Stan Lane) (with Jim Cornette) by disqualification	Tag team match for the NWA World Tag Team Championship
11	Steve Williams (with Magnum T. A.) defeated Dick Murdoch (with Eddie Gilbert)	Texas Death Match
12	The Road Warriors (Animal and Hawk), Nikita Koloff, Dusty Rhodes, and Paul Ellering defeated The Four Horsemen (Ric Flair, Arn Anderson, Lex Luger, Tully Blanchard, and J. J. Dillon) (with Dark Journey)	WarGames match
(c) / – the champion(s) heading into the match

July 18, 1987 in Charlotte, North Carolina (Memorial Stadium)

No.	Results	Stipulations
1	Kendall Windham, Jimmy Valiant, and LazerTron defeated Sean Royal, Gladiator #1, and Gladiator #2	Six-man tag team match
2	Chris Adams defeated Black Bart (with Skandor Akbar)	Singles match
3	Barry Windham (c) defeated Big Bubba Rogers (with Skandor Akbar)	Singles match for the NWA Western States Heritage Championship
4	"Dr. Death" Steve Williams and Terry Gordy defeated Eddie Gilbert and Dick Murdoch	Bunkhouse match
5	The Fabulous Freebirds (Michael Hayes and Buddy Roberts) defeated The Midnight Express (Bobby Eaton and Stan Lane) (c) (with Jim Cornette) by disqualification.	Tag team match for the NWA United States Tag Team Champions
6	The Rock 'n' Roll Express (Ricky Morton and Robert Gibson) (c) defeated The MOD Squad (Spike and Basher)	Tag team match for the NWA World Tag Team Championship
7	Road Warrior Animal (with Paul Ellering) defeated Arn Anderson (with J. J. Dillon)	Taped Fist match
8	Lex Luger (with J. J. Dillon) defeated Nikita Koloff (c)	Steel cage match for the NWA United States Championship
9	Ric Flair (c) (with J. J. Dillon) defeated Road Warrior Hawk (with Paul Ellering) by disqualification	Singles match for the NWA World Heavyweight Championship
10	Dusty Rhodes (with Barry Windham) defeated Tully Blanchard (with J. J. Dillon and Dark Journey)	"Lights-out" Barbed Wire Ladder match for $100,000.
(c) / – the champion(s) heading into the match

July 31, 1987 in Miami, Florida (Orange Bowl)

No.	Results	Stipulations
1	Manny Fernandez and The Barbarian (with Paul Jones) defeated The Mulkey Brothers (Randy Mulkey and Bill Mulkey)	Tag team match
2	Barry Windham (c) defeated Incubus	Singles match for the NWA Western States Heritage Championship
3	The Sheepherders (Luke Williams and Butch Miller) (c) vs. Jimmy Garvin and Ron Garvin (with Precious) ended in a double disqualification	Tag team match for the NWA Florida Tag Team Championship
4	Mike Rotunda (c) defeated Ivan Koloff	Singles match for the NWA Florida Heavyweight Championship
5	Kevin Sullivan defeated Dory Funk Jr.	Texas Death Match
6	The Rock 'n' Roll Express (Ricky Morton and Robert Gibson) (c) defeated The Midnight Express (Bobby Eaton and Stan Lane) (with Jim Cornette)	Tag team match for the NWA World Tag Team Championship
7	The Road Warriors (Animal and Hawk), Dusty Rhodes, Nikita Koloff, and Paul Ellering defeated The Four Horsemen (Ric Flair, Arn Anderson, Lex Luger, and Tully Blanchard) and The War Machine (with J. J. Dillon and Dark Journey)	WarGames match
(c) / – the champion(s) heading into the match

== 2012 ==
SuperSmackDown Live: The Great American Bash
- Promotion: WWE
- Date: July 3, 2012
- City: Corpus Christi, Texas
- Venue: American Bank Center

SmackDown special episodes chronology
← Previous —	Next → SmackDown's 20th Anniversary

The Great American Bash chronology
← Previous; The Bash	Next → 2020

SuperSmackDown Live: The Great American Bash was a 2012 professional wrestling television special produced by WWE. It was WWE's seventh Great American Bash, and the 21st overall, and it aired as a special episode of SmackDown, promoted as a SuperSmackDown Live edition. It took place on July 3, 2012, at the American Bank Center in Corpus Christi, Texas. This was the first Great American Bash held since the 2009 event, which aired on pay-per-view and had been titled The Bash; the 2012 event returned to using the full name of "The Great American Bash".

This was the first Great American Bash to be held as a television special, subsequently being the first to air as a special episode of one of WWE's weekly programs. It was also the final Great American Bash until it was reinstated in 2020, becoming an annual event for WWE's developmental brand, NXT.

No.	Results	Stipulations	Times
1	The Great Khali and Layla defeated Antonio Cesaro and Aksana	Mixed tag team match	1:56
2	Cody Rhodes defeated Christian	World Heavyweight Championship Money in the Bank qualifying match	12:50
3	Dolph Ziggler defeated Alex Riley	World Heavyweight Championship Money in the Bank qualifying match	4:26
4	Jim Duggan, Santino Marella, and Sgt. Slaughter defeated Camacho, Drew McIntyre, and Hunico	Six-man tag team match	7:25
5	Ryback defeated Curt Hawkins (with Tyler Reks)	Singles match	3:10
6	Zack Ryder won by last eliminating Kane (Note: The other participants were: Alberto Del Rio, Big Show, Brodus Clay, Christian, CM Punk, Cody Rhodes, Damien Sandow, Daniel Bryan, Dolph Ziggler, Ezekiel Jackson, The Great Khali, Heath Slater, Jack Swagger, John Cena, Justin Gabriel, Kofi Kingston, Santino Marella, and Tensai.)	The Great American Bash 20-Man Battle Royal to determine the guest General Manager for the following week's SmackDown	10:48

=== Battle Royal ===
Elimination	Wrestler	Eliminated by	Time	Eliminations
1	Justin Gabriel	Big Show	0:16	0
2	Brodus Clay	Big Show	0:33	0
3	Ezekiel Jackson	Tensai	1:03	0
4	The Great Khali	Del Rio, Swagger & Tensai	1:38	0
5	Damien Sandow	Zack Ryder	1:58	0
6	Santino Marella	Cody Rhodes	2:15	0
7	Cody Rhodes	Big Show	2:46	1
8	Kofi Kingston	Big Show	2:57	0
9	Heath Slater	Big Show	5:33*^{1}	0
10	Jack Swagger	John Cena	5:55*^{2}	1
11	CM Punk	Daniel Bryan	6:16	1
12	Daniel Bryan	CM Punk	6:16	1
13	Alberto Del Rio	John Cena	8:10	1
14	Tensai	John Cena	8:39	2
15	John Cena	Big Show	8:44	3
16	Christian	Big Show	9:06	0
17	Dolph Ziggler	Kane	9:20	0
18	Big Show	Kane	9:20	7
19	Kane	Zack Ryder	10:48	2
Winner:	Zack Ryder			

Notes

1. Slater and Swagger's eliminations occurred during a commercial break.
