= David P. Baker =

American sociologist (born 1952)

- Education: Johns Hopkins University (Ph.D.), Boston University (M.S.), Albion College (B.A.)
- Known for: The concept of "schooled society," impact of education on cultural and scientific transformations
- Scientific career
- Fields: Sociology, Education, Demography, History of Science
- Workplaces: Pennsylvania State University

David P. Baker is an American professor of Sociology, Education, and Demography at Pennsylvania State University. His research examines the global impact of education, particularly the emergence of the "schooled society" and the role of education in shaping economic and scientific transformations.

== Education ==
Baker earned his Ph.D. in Sociology from Johns Hopkins University, an M.S. in Communication Research from Boston University, and a B.A. in Psychology from Albion College.

== Academic career ==
Baker is a professor of Sociology, Education, and Demography at Pennsylvania State University. He has published extensively on the sociology of education, analyzing how formal education contributes to economic growth, social mobility, and knowledge production. His research has been published in peer-reviewed journals.

== Research focus ==
Baker's recent work focuses on the historical relationship between education and scientific knowledge. His book, Global Mega-Science: Universities, Research Collaborations, and Knowledge Production, co-authored with Justin J.W. Powell, examines how universities drive scientific advancement. This book, along with its companion, The Century of Science: The Global Triumph of the Research University (Powell, Baker & Fernandez, Eds.; Emerald, 2017) analyze the expansion of higher education and its impact on research collaborations and scientific discovery. This work has been cited by policymakers and international education organizations.

Baker's 2014 book The Schooled Society: The Educational Transformation of Global Culture, reviewed in the American Journal of Sociology, has won numerous awards. His many contributions to educational sociology have been published in leading journals, including Research in Sociology of Education.

Baker's research has also been cited in major education policy reports by organizations like the OECD and UNESCO, recognizing his work in shaping educational frameworks worldwide.

== Honors and fellowships ==
- George Sarton Chair and Medal: In 2023–24, Baker was awarded the George Sarton Chair and Medal in the History of Science by the University of Ghent in Belgium. This honor acknowledges his leadership in researching the growth of global mega-science and the scientization of world culture from 1900 to the present.
- Association of American Publishers’ 2018 PROSE Award for Excellence in Social Sciences: Education Theory for The Century of Science (J.J.W. Powell, D.P. Baker, F. Fernandez, eds.).
- Association for the Study of Higher Education (ASHE) 2017 Award for Significant Research on International Higher Education for The Century of Science (J.J.W. Powell, D.P. Baker, F. Fernandez, eds.).
- American Educational Research Association (AERA) 2015 Outstanding Book Award recognizing its important contribution to educational research.
- Independent Publisher Book Awards (IPPY): The same book also earned a Silver Medal in the Education Commentary/Theory category in 2015.

== Selected publications ==
- Baker, D. P., & Powell, J. J. W. (2024). Global Mega-Science: Universities, Research Collaborations, and Knowledge Production. Stanford University Press. ISBN 978-1503637894.
- Powell, J. J. W., Baker, D. P., & Fernandez, F. (Eds.) (2017). The Century of Science. Emerald Publishing. ISBN 978-1787144705.
- Baker, D. P. (2014). The Schooled Society: The Educational Transformation of Global Culture. Stanford University Press. ISBN 978-0804790475.
- Baker, D. P., & LeTendre, G. K. (2005). National Differences, Global Similarities: World Culture and the Future of Schooling. Stanford University Press. ISBN 978-0804750219.
