= David Martin Baker =

American politician

Member of the West Virginia House of Delegates from Cabell County
- In office 1953–1953
- In office 1957–1958

Personal details
- Born: October 11, 1923 Clarksburg, Harrison County, West Virginia, U.S.
- Died: April 27, 2010 (aged 86)
- Party: Republican
- Profession: Lawyer, judge

Military service
- Branch/service: United States Army Air Forces
- Years of service: World War II

David Martin Baker (October 11, 1923 Clarksburg, Harrison County, WV - April 27, 2010) was a Republican member of West Virginia State House of Delegates from Cabell County, 1953, 1957–58, with defeats in 1954 and 1958. In 1967 he was the vice-chair of West Virginia Republican Party. He lived in Huntington, Cabell County, West Virginia.

== Biography ==
Baker served in the U.S. Army Air Force in World War II. He was a lawyer and served as a judge on the West Virginia Court of Claims (1990–2005).He was named a fellow of the West Virginia Bar Foundation in 2004 and served as president of the Lawyer-Pilots Bar association. Additionally he was a member of the American Legion, the Elks, and Phi Delta Phi. He was among a few Jewish members ever serving in the West Virginia Legislature.
