= NXT: The Great American Bash (2020) =

WWE two-part television special

- Promotional poster featuring various NXT wrestlers
- Promotion: WWE
- Brand: NXT
- Date: July 1, 2020 (aired July 1 and 8, 2020)
- City: Winter Park, Florida
- Venue: Full Sail University
- Attendance: 0 (behind closed doors) (Note: The event was held without a paying audience due to the COVID-19 pandemic in the United States, though it featured a live crowd of WWE wrestlers and trainees.)

NXT special episodes chronology
← Previous; 2019 Year-End Awards	Next → Super Tuesday

The Great American Bash chronology
← Previous; 2012	Next → 2021

The 2020 NXT: The Great American Bash was a two-part professional wrestling television special produced by WWE, held for wrestlers from the promotion's NXT brand division. It was NXT's first annual Great American Bash, the eighth produced by WWE, and the 22nd overall, and it aired as a two-part special episode of the weekly series NXT on the USA Network. The event was taped on July 1, 2020, at NXT's home venue at the time, Full Sail University in Winter Park, Florida. The first part aired that night on July 1 while the second part aired on tape delay on July 8.

This was the first Great American Bash held since 2012 as well as the first to air as a television special of NXT, subsequently becoming an annual event for NXT. The two-night event went head-to-head against All Elite Wrestling's two-part television special Fyter Fest, which was held on the same nights.

== Production ==
=== Background ===
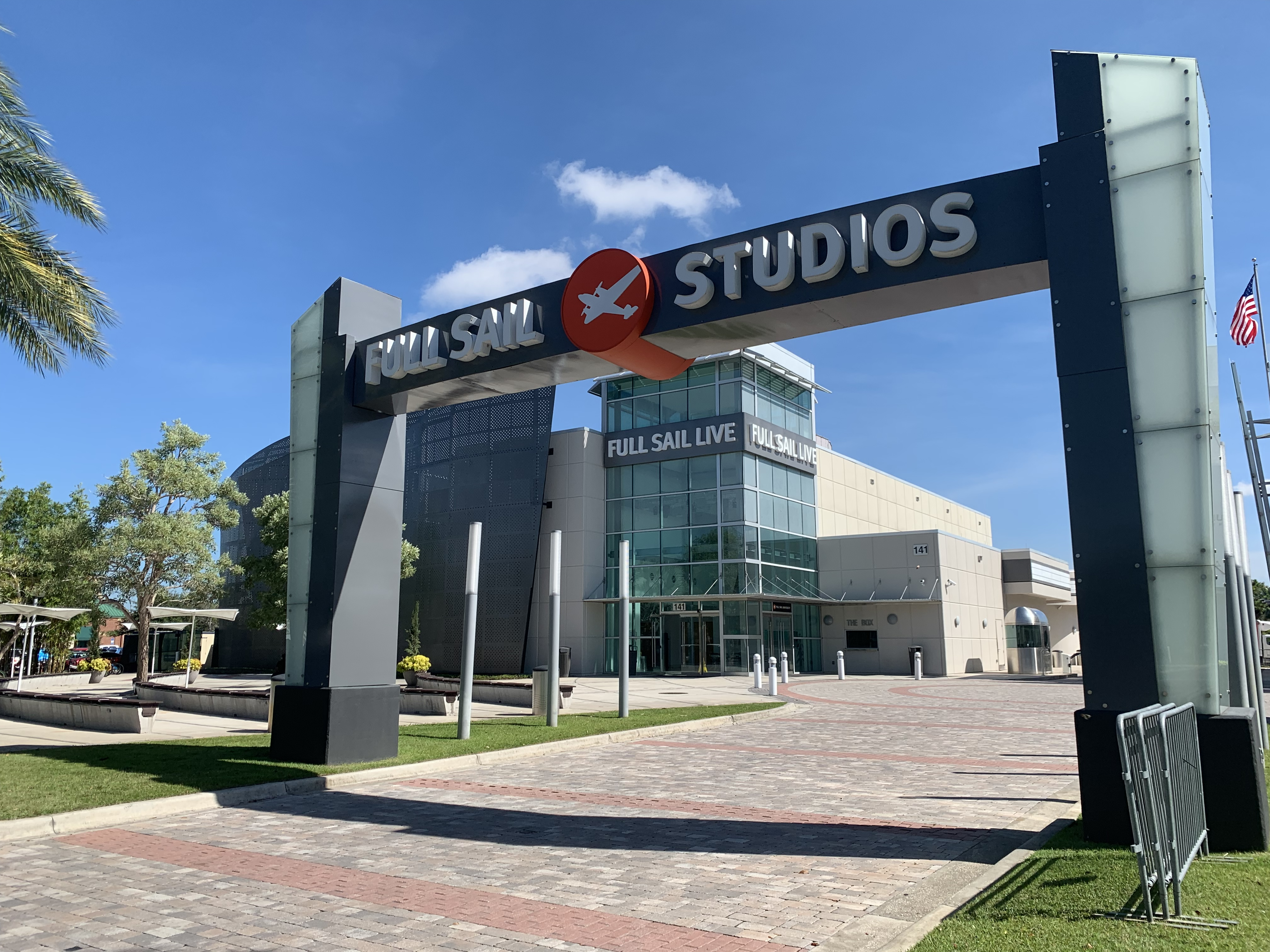
Due to the COVID-19 pandemic, WWE's eighth Great American Bash, and inaugural for NXT, was held at the brand's home venue at the time, Full Sail University in Winter Park, Florida.

The Great American Bash is a professional wrestling event established in 1985, held during the summer. Following WWE's acquisition of World Championship Wrestling (WCW) in March 2001, WWE revived The Great American Bash as its own pay-per-view (PPV) event in 2004 and it was held annually until 2009. After the 2009 event, which was truncated as The Bash, it was discontinued until it was held once more as a television special of SmackDown in 2012, which returned to using the event's full name, after which, it was again discontinued.

On June 24, 2020, after eight years, WWE announced that The Great American Bash would be reinstated, but this time as a television special for the NXT brand. The eighth Great American Bash produced by WWE, and 22nd overall, was scheduled to be broadcast as a two-part special episode of NXT on the USA Network, airing as the July 1 and July 8 episodes. Both episodes were taped on July 1. The two-night event went head-to-head against All Elite Wrestling's two-part television special Fyter Fest, which was held on the same nights.

==== Impact of the COVID-19 pandemic ====
As a result of the COVID-19 pandemic that began affecting the industry in mid-March, WWE had to present the majority of its programming from a behind closed doors set. NXT's events were subsequently held at the brand's home venue at the time, Full Sail University in Winter Park, Florida.

=== Storylines ===
The event included matches that resulted from scripted storylines. Results were predetermined by WWE's writers on the NXT brand, while storylines were produced on WWE's weekly television show, NXT.

One scheduled match for the July 8 broadcast was a champion vs. champion winner takes all match between NXT Champion Adam Cole and NXT North American Champion Keith Lee.

== Results ==
Night 1 (July 1)
No.	Results	Stipulations	Times
1	Tegan Nox defeated Candice LeRae, Dakota Kai, and Mia Yim	Fatal four-way elimination match to determine the #1 contender for the NXT Women's Championship	20:37
2	Timothy Thatcher defeated Oney Lorcan by submission	Singles match	11:32
3	Rhea Ripley defeated Aliyah and Robert Stone by submission	Intergender Handicap match Had Ripley lost, she would have joined the Robert Stone Brand.	10:03
4	Dexter Lumis defeated Roderick Strong	Strap match	16:00
5	Io Shirai defeated Sasha Banks (with Bayley)	Singles match	14:01

Night 2 (July 8)
No.	Results	Stipulations	Times
1^{D}	Tony Nese defeated Leon Ruff	Singles match	—
2	Candice LeRae defeated Mia Yim	Street Fight	15:51
3	Bronson Reed defeated Tony Nese	Singles match	5:18
4	Johnny Gargano defeated Isaiah "Swerve" Scott	Singles match	14:18
5	Legado del Fantasma (Santos Escobar, Joaquin Wilde, and Raul Mendoza) defeated Drake Maverick and Breezango (Tyler Breeze and Fandango)	Six-man tag team match	10:38
6	Mercedes Martinez defeated Santana Garrett	Singles match	2:39
7	Keith Lee (North American) defeated Adam Cole (NXT)	Winner Takes All match for the NXT Championship and NXT North American Championship	19:55
D / – this was a dark match
