= David Baker (cricketer, born 1935) =

English cricketer (1935–2021)

Personal information
- Full name: David William Baker
- Born: 26 July 1935; Kingston upon Hull, Yorkshire
- Died: 26 December 2021 (aged 86); Beeston, Nottinghamshire
- Batting: Right-handed
- Bowling: Legbreak, googly
- Role: Bowler

Domestic team information
- Years: Team
- 1961–1963: Kent
- 1964–1965: Nottinghamshire
- FC debut: 31 May 1961 Kent v Glamorgan
- Last FC: 26 June 1965 Notts v Yorkshire

Career statistics
| Competition | First-class |
|---|---|
| Matches | 34 |
| Runs scored | 101 |
| Batting average | 4.20 |
| 100s/50s | 0/0 |
| Top score | 15 |
| Balls bowled | 5,392 |
| Wickets | 78 |
| Bowling average | 36.61 |
| 5 wickets in innings | 3 |
| 10 wickets in match | 0 |
| Best bowling | 5/47 |
| Catches/stumpings | 11/– |
- Source: CricInfo, 20 March 2017

David William Baker (26 July 1935 – 26 December 2021) was an English professional cricketer who played first-class cricket between 1961 and 1965 for Kent and Nottinghamshire County Cricket Clubs.

Baker was born at Kingston upon Hull in 1935 but was educated at Bermondsey in London. He was a legbreak and googly bowler who played in 34 first-class matches in his career.

After National Service in the Royal Air Force, Baker signed for Kent in 1959 and was awarded his Second XI cap in 1960. He made his senior debut for the team in 1961. Baker played 27 times for Kent between 1961 and the end of the 1963 season before moving to Nottinghamshire. He played seven times in two seasons for Notts before being released by the club. He continued to play club cricket and ran a public house at Bramcote in Nottinghamshire.

Baker died at Beeston in Nottinghamshire in December 2021 after a long illness. He was aged 86.
