= Gabs =

Gabs or GABS may refer to:

- Golden Arrow Bus Services, a bus company in Cape Town, South Africa
- Gaborone, the capital and largest city of the Botswana nicknamed Gabs
- Great Australasian Beer SpecTAPular, a craft beer festival commonly knows as GABS
- Modibo Keita International Airport, Mali airport with ICAO identifier GABS

== See also ==
- Gabès, a city in Tunisia
- Gab (disambiguation)
