= David Bristow Baker =

English religious writer

David Bristow Baker (1803, Newington, Surrey – 24 July 1852) was an English religious writer.

Baker was born in 1803, the second son of David Bristow Baker, a Blackfriars merchant. He was educated at St. John's College, Cambridge, where he graduated B.A. in 1829, and M.A. in 1832. Though admitted to the Middle Temple in 1824, he was never called to the Bar. From 1841 until his death in 1852 he was perpetual curate of Claygate, Surrey. He was the author of A treatise on the nature and causes of doubt, in religious questions: with a particular reference to Christianity (1831) and Discourses and sacramental Addresses to a Village Congregation (1832).
