= Regab =

Regab رگاب
- Village
- Location within Iran
- Coordinates: 27°48′00″N 57°16′00″E
- Country: Iran
- Province: Hormozgan
- County: Rudan
- Bakhsh: Rudkhaneh
- Rural District: Rudkhaneh Bar

Population (2006)
  - Total: 189
- Time zone: UTC+3:30 (IRST)
  - Summer (DST): UTC+4:30 (IRDT)

Regab (Persian: رگاب, also Romanized as Regāb; also known as Gāb and Rīgāu) is a village in Rudkhaneh Bar Rural District, Rudkhaneh District, Rudan County, Hormozgan Province, Iran. At the 2006 census, its population was 189, in 44 families.
