= The Great American Bash (2004) =

World Wrestling Entertainment pay-per-view event

- Promotional poster featuring Torrie Wilson
- Promotion: World Wrestling Entertainment
- Brand: SmackDown!
- Date: June 27, 2004
- City: Norfolk, Virginia
- Venue: Norfolk Scope
- Attendance: 6,500
- Buy rate: 238,000
- Tagline: Join Our Party

Pay-per-view chronology
← Previous; Bad Blood	Next → Vengeance

The Great American Bash chronology
← Previous; 2000	Next → 2005

The 2004 Great American Bash was a professional wrestling pay-per-view (PPV) event produced by World Wrestling Entertainment (WWE). It was WWE's inaugural Great American Bash and the 15th overall. The event took place on June 27, 2004, at the Norfolk Scope in Norfolk, Virginia, held exclusively for wrestlers from the promotion's SmackDown! brand division.

The Great American Bash was originally promoted by Jim Crockett Promotions of the National Wrestling Alliance before becoming a World Championship Wrestling (WCW) event. WWE acquired WCW in 2001, thus the 2004 event was the first Great American Bash held since WCW's event in 2000. The 2004 event grossed $325,000 with 6,500 ticket sales and received a 0.47 buyrate.

Three of the eight matches on the card were contested for a championship; one was lost while the other two were retained. The main event was a Handicap Concrete Crypt match between The Dudley Boyz (Bubba Ray and D-Von) and The Undertaker. The Undertaker won the match after pinning D-Von following a Tombstone piledriver. One of the featured matches on the undercard was a Texas Bullrope match for the WWE Championship between John "Bradshaw" Layfield (JBL) and champion Eddie Guerrero. JBL won the match and the WWE Championship after touching all four turnbuckles in succession. Guerrero was at first declared the winner, but General manager Kurt Angle came out and showed that JBL had touched the final turnbuckle before Guerrero. Another primary match on the undercard was Rey Mysterio versus Chavo Guerrero for the WWE Cruiserweight Championship, which Mysterio won with a sunset flip.

== Production ==
=== Background ===
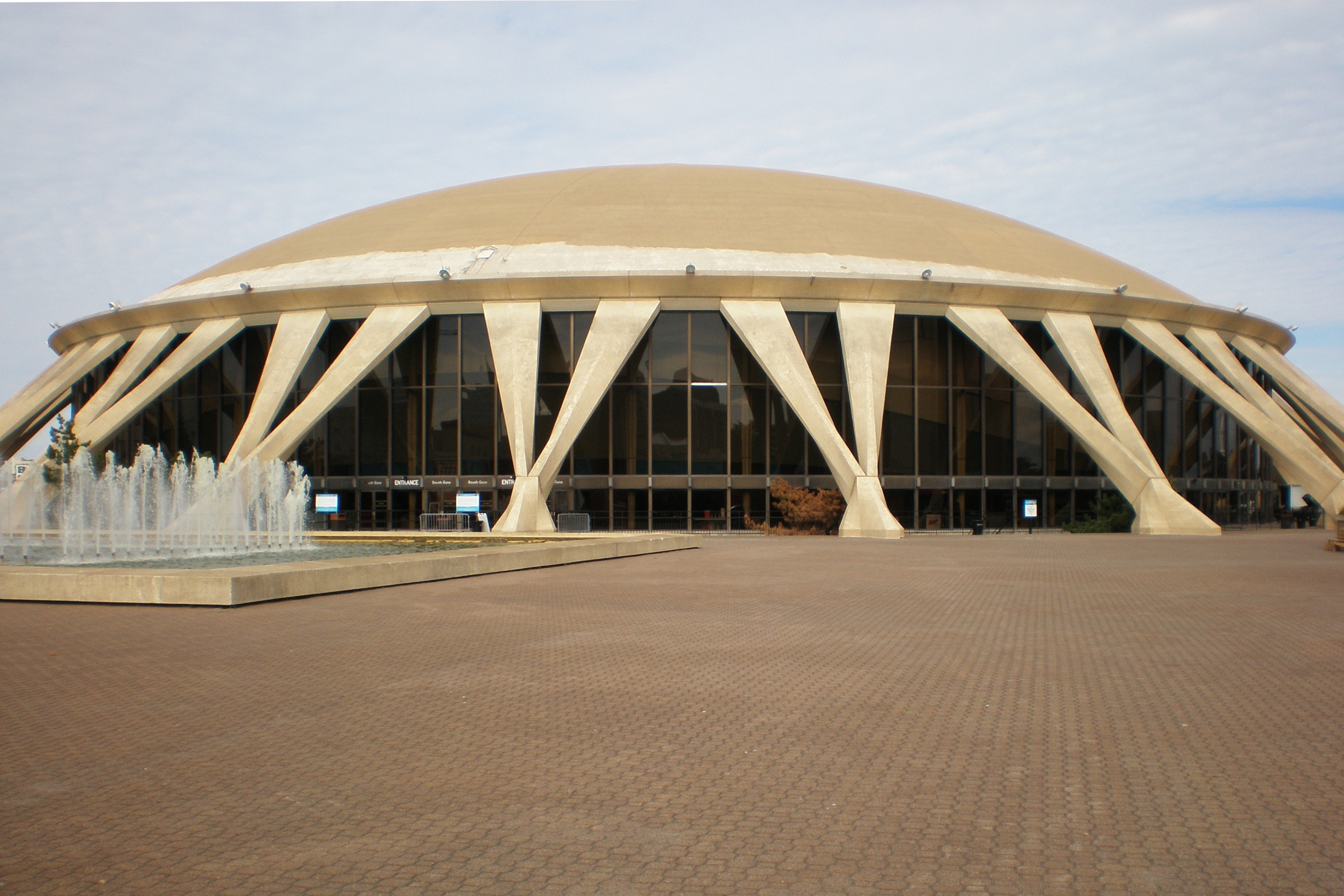
WWE's inaugural Great American Bash was held at the Norfolk Scope in Norfolk, Virginia.

The Great American Bash is a professional wrestling event that was established in 1985 and held during the summer. It was first produced by Jim Crockett Promotions (JCP) of the National Wrestling Alliance (NWA) and aired on closed-circuit television before becoming a pay-per-view (PPV) event in 1988; JCP was rebranded as World Championship Wrestling (WCW) later that same year, which seceded from the NWA in 1991. The final Great American Bash event promoted by WCW was the 2000 event, as in March 2001, the then-World Wrestling Federation (WWF) purchased WCW; in May 2002, the WWF was renamed to World Wrestling Entertainment (WWE), while two months before that in March, WWE introduced the brand extension where the promotion divided its roster in two brands, Raw and SmackDown!, where wrestlers were exclusively assigned to perform on their respective shows.

After three years since the acquisition of WCW, WWE revived The Great American Bash as its own PPV event. It was scheduled to be held on June 27, 2004, at the Norfolk Scope in Norfolk, Virginia. Although it was the first Great American Bash held by WWE, it was the 15th overall, and it was held exclusively for wrestlers from the SmackDown! brand.

=== Storylines ===
The main feud heading into The Great American Bash was between The Dudley Boyz (Bubba Ray Dudley and D-Von Dudley) and The Undertaker. On the May 27 episode of SmackDown!, Paul Heyman told The Dudley Boyz to "make an impact". As part of the storyline, The Dudley Boyz responded by abducting Paul Bearer, The Undertaker's manager. On the June 3 episode of SmackDown!, Heyman told The Undertaker that the only way he would ever see Bearer again, was to align himself with The Dudley Boyz. On the June 17 episode of SmackDown!, a handicap match between The Dudley Boyz and The Undertaker was booked for The Great American Bash, with the stipulation being if The Dudley Boyz won, Bearer would be buried in a glass crypt with cement.

Another primary feud heading into the event was between Eddie Guerrero and John "Bradshaw" Layfield (JBL) over the WWE Championship. At Judgment Day, JBL defeated Guerrero by disqualification after Guerrero hit JBL with the WWE Championship belt. Since a championship cannot be lost via countout or disqualification, Guerrero retained the title. On the May 27 episode of SmackDown!, SmackDown! General Manager Kurt Angle announced that JBL was the number-one contender to the WWE Championship at The Great American Bash, and that JBL was allowed to choose the stipulation for the match. On the June 3 episode of SmackDown!, JBL announced that his match against Guerrero would be a Texas Bullrope match.

One of the main matches on the undercard was a Fatal Four-Way Elimination match for the WWE United States Championship between the champion, John Cena, René Duprée, Booker T, and Rob Van Dam. At Judgment Day, Cena defeated Duprée to retain the United States Championship. On the May 20 episode of SmackDown!, Cena faced Duprée in a rematch for the title. Duprée executed a low blow on Cena outside the ring, which caused Cena to be counted out. Duprée won the match, but not the title since a championship cannot be lost via countout or disqualification. On the May 27 episode of SmackDown!, Cena defeated Duprée in a Lumberjack match to retain the title. On the June 3 episode of SmackDown!, Cena confronted Booker T about his interference in the Lumberjack match the week before. As General Manager Kurt Angle told Cena to leave the arena, Booker T attacked Cena from behind and pushed him onto Angle. Angle claimed he was going to strip Cena of the United States Championship for what he did. On the June 10 episode of SmackDown!, Cena faced Booker T, Van Dam, and Duprée, respectively, in one-on-one matches with a five-minute time limit. The man to defeat Cena would become the number-one contender to the United States Championship at The Great American Bash. Cena, however, won all three matches as no man was able to defeat him within the time limit. This led to Angle booking Cena in a Fatal Four-Way match for the title at The Great American Bash. On the June 17 episode of SmackDown!, Angle changed the match to an elimination match.

The Divas rivalry heading into the event was between Sable and Torrie Wilson. Sable and Torrie teamed together at WrestleMania XX and defeated Raw Divas Miss Jackie and Stacy Keibler, but when Torrie was featured on the cover of SmackDown! Magazine, Sable turned heel by displaying jealousy over Torrie's cover and berating her in a backstage segment, leading to a brawl between the two Divas. The events led to the announcement that Sable and Torrie would face each other at The Great American Bash.

== Event ==
Other on-screen personnel
Role:	Name:
English commentators	Michael Cole
English commentators	Tazz
Spanish commentators	Carlos Cabrera
Spanish commentators	Hugo Savinovich
Interviewer	Dawn Marie
Ring announcer	Tony Chimel
Referee	Nick Patrick
Referee	Charles Robinson
Referee	Brian Hebner
Referee	Jim Korderas

Before the live broadcast of the event began, Spike Dudley defeated Jamie Noble in a match that aired on Sunday Night Heat.

=== Preliminary matches ===
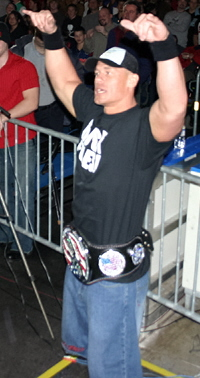
John Cena retained the United States Championship at the event

The first match of the event was a Fatal Four-Way Elimination match for the WWE United States Championship in which John Cena defended the title against René Duprée, Booker T, and Rob Van Dam. Cena eliminated Van Dam with a roll-up. Booker eliminated Duprée by pinning him following an (FU) from Cena. Cena eliminated Booker after an FU to retain the title.

The next match was between Luther Reigns and Charlie Haas. After a match predominantly controlled by Reigns, Reigns executed a Reign of Terror for the win.

The third match was between Rey Mysterio Jr. and Chavo Guerrero for the WWE Cruiserweight Championship. Guerrero gained the early advantage, as he applied various submission holds to Mysterio's knee, including a single leg Boston crab and an Argentine leglock. After a back and forth match between the two, Mysterio pinned Guerrero with a sunset flip powerbomb to retain the title.

The match that followed saw Kenzo Suzuki face Billy Gunn. The match went back and forth, as each man was able to gain the advantage numerous times. Suzuki defeated Gunn after an inverted headlock backbreaker.

The following match was between Sable and Torrie Wilson. Sable controlled Wilson throughout the contest, as she choked her using the bottom rope and applied a criss-cross choke. After both women ran into each other, Sable pinned Wilson with a schoolgirl to win the match.

The sixth match was between Mordecai and Hardcore Holly, which Mordecai won after performing a powerbomb.

=== Main event matches ===
The next match was a Texas Bullrope match for the WWE Championship between Eddie Guerrero and John "Bradshaw" Layfield (JBL). One preplanned move in the match saw Guerrero hit JBL with a steel chair, which caused JBL to bleed. Guerrero went on to touch three turnbuckles but was unable to touch the fourth as JBL held him back. Guerrero executed a dropkick on JBL and attempted to touch the fourth again but JBL held him back and took the advantage. JBL threw Guerrero into a broadcast table and executed a powerbomb through the broadcast table. In the end, each man had touched three turnbuckles and were vying for the fourth. Guerrero attempted to jump over JBL and touch the remaining turnbuckle, but was unsuccessful; he splashed himself and JBL into the turnbuckle. Guerrero was declared the winner, as it appeared he had touched all four turnbuckles first, but SmackDown! General Manager Kurt Angle came out and reversed the decision. He showed on the TitanTron that JBL's shoulder touched the final turnbuckle before Guerrero's hand, also, Angle stated that it did not matter which part of the body touched, all that mattered was who touched first; as a result, JBL won the WWE Championship.

The main event saw The Undertaker face off against The Dudley Boyz (Bubba Ray Dudley and D-Von Dudley) in a Handicap match. Per the pre-match stipulation, Paul Bearer would be cemented in a glass crypt if The Dudley Boyz won. Throughout the duration of the match, Bearer was locked on a chair inside a glass crypt with the pump of a cement truck above him. After a match evenly controlled by Undertaker and The Dudleys, Undertaker pinned D-Von following a Tombstone piledriver to win. After the match, Undertaker pulled the lever to the cement truck, which in turn filled the crypt with Bearer inside full of cement. Much of the footage of Bearer in the cement during the PPV broadcast of the show was of Bearer pre-taped before the show, while a stunt double was used for Bearer in the tank when the match took place in the Arena for actual burial which is seen in live shots and in footage of the actual burial.

== Aftermath ==
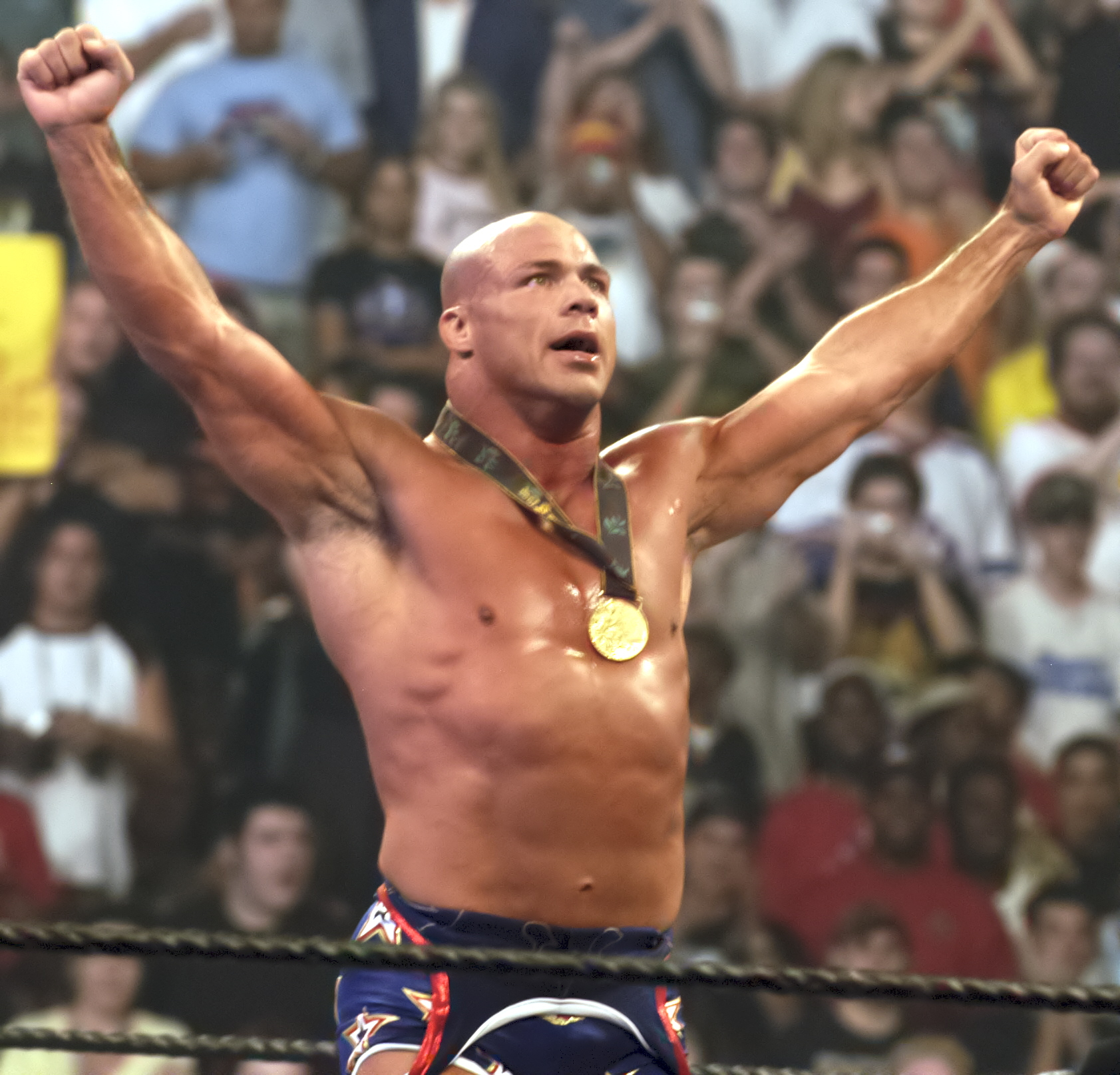
Kurt Angle, who began feuding with Eddie Guerrero following the event

After the event, it was stated in the following episode of Smackdown that Bearer survived his concrete burial but had suffered kayfabe "serious injuries", writing him off TV.

At the event, John "Bradshaw" Layfield (JBL) defeated Eddie Guerrero to begin his first reign as WWE Champion, which would last nearly ten months. JBL began feuding with The Undertaker following the event, and the two faced off for the WWE Championship at SummerSlam. JBL won the match and retained the title after The Undertaker was disqualified for hitting JBL with the title belt. The two faced off again at No Mercy in an Last Ride match, in which the objective is to place your opponent in a hearse and drive out of the arena. JBL defeated The Undertaker and concluded their storyline after interference from Heidenreich.

Following the conclusion of his title match against JBL at the event, Eddie Guerrero began to feud with Kurt Angle. During a Steel Cage match between Guerrero and JBL for the WWE Championship, El Gran Luchadore (Kurt Angle in disguise) interfered on JBL's behalf, which allowed JBL to escape the cage and win the match. After the match, Guerrero attacked El Gran Luchadore and pulled off his mask, revealing him to be Kurt Angle. The following week, Vince McMahon fired Angle from his position as Smackdown GM & scheduled a match between the two at SummerSlam. Angle won the match, and their feud concluded at the November pay-per-view, Survivor Series, when Guerrero's team defeated Angle's in a 4 on 4 Survivor Series match.

On the July 8 episode of SmackDown!, Booker T challenged John Cena for the WWE United States Championship. During the match, General manager Kurt Angle and Luther Reigns interfered on Booker's behalf, and Booker inadvertently caused Cena to attack Angle. The match ended in a disqualification subsequently thereafter; however, Angle stripped Cena of the title for attacking him. On the July 29 episode of SmackDown!, Booker T won the vacant United States Championship after last eliminating Rob Van Dam in an elimination match. The following week, Cena defeated Van Dam to become the number-one contender to the title. Theodore Long, who proceeded Angle as General Manager after he was fired as part of the storyline, announced that Cena would be facing Booker in a "Best of 5 series", in which the winner would be the man who earns three victories over the other first. Cena defeated Booker in the first match at SummerSlam, and eventually won the fifth and final match at No Mercy to begin his second reign as United States Champion.

The Great American Bash would continue as an annual summer PPV for WWE until 2009, with that year's event titled as The Bash. In 2010, the event was replaced on PPV by Fatal 4-Way. The event, which reverted to being called The Great American Bash, then returned in July 2012 as a special episode of SmackDown. It was again revived in 2020 for the NXT brand and has since been held as an annual event for NXT.

== Results ==
No.	Results	Stipulations	Times
1^{H}	Spike Dudley defeated Jamie Noble	Singles match	4:13
2	John Cena (c) defeated Booker T, René Duprée and Rob Van Dam	Fatal 4-Way Elimination match for the WWE United States Championship	15:51
3	Luther Reigns (with Kurt Angle) defeated Charlie Haas (with Jackie Gayda)	Singles match	7:11
4	Rey Mysterio (c) defeated Chavo Guerrero	Singles match for the WWE Cruiserweight Championship	19:40
5	Kenzo Suzuki (with Hiroko) defeated Billy Gunn	Singles match	8:06
6	Sable defeated Torrie Wilson	Singles match	6:06
7	Mordecai defeated Hardcore Holly	Singles match	6:31
8	John "Bradshaw" Layfield defeated Eddie Guerrero (c)	Texas Bullrope match for the WWE Championship	21:06
9	The Undertaker defeated The Dudley Boyz (Bubba Ray and D-Von) (with Paul Heyman)	Handicap Concrete Crypt match	14:43
(c) / – the champion(s) heading into the match; H / – the match was broadcast prior to the pay-per-view on Sunday Night Heat

Fatal Four-Way eliminations
Elimination No.	Wrestler	Eliminated by	Elimination move	Time
1	Rob Van Dam	John Cena	Pinfall with a roll-up	8:17
2	Rene Dupree	Booker T	Pinfall after an FU from Cena	11:15
3	Booker T	John Cena	Pinfall after an FU	15:51
