= David Baker-Gabb =

New Zealand and Australian ornithologist

David John Baker-Gabb is a New Zealand and Australian ornithologist. He is best known for his work on Australian birds of prey and the birds of Australia, New Zealand and Oceania. He also served from 1993 to 1997 as director of the Royal Australasian Ornithologists Union.

== Career ==
Baker-Gabb studied agriculture and then biology at Massey University in Palmerston North, New Zealand, graduating in 1978 with a master's degree in science for his work on the swamp harrier. He then went to Monash University in Melbourne, where he studied the swamp harrier, the spotted harrier and other Australian birds of prey to earn his PhD. He devoted himself from 1984 to 1987 to the study and conservation of the plains-wanderer. Between 1988 and 1989 he studied the habits of the red goshawk in the Northern Territory until 1990 when he joined the Department of Conservation and Environment in Victoria as a manager of threatened fauna, a role he carried out until 1992.

From 1993, Baker-Gabb served as Director of the Royal Australasian Ornithologists Union, and during his term of office he established the Gluepot Reserve in South Australia. After 1997, Baker-Gabb founded an environmental consulting company that specialised in threatened species recovery, wildlife surveys, the production of management plans and the assessment of properties for acquisition as reserves.

== Family ==
Baker-Gabb married conservationist and ornithologist Julie Catherine (Kate) Fitzherbert in 1981, managing editor for the Handbook of Australian, New Zealand and Antarctic Birds from 1986 to 1987 and then supporter services co-ordinator for the Royal Australasian Ornithologists Union until 2000. Kate then took up a similar role with Bush Heritage Australia before becoming Bush Heritage's science and monitoring manager in 2008. They have two children.

== Selected works ==
- Aspects of the biology of the Australasian harrier (Circus aeruginosus approximans Peale 1848): a thesis presented for the degree of Master of Science by thesis only in Zoology at Massey University. 1978
- Comparative ecology and behaviour of swamp harriers Circus approximans, spotted harriers C. assimilis and other raptors in Australia and New Zealand. 1982
- Relative abundance, distribution and seasonal movements of Australian falconiformes 1986-1990. 1999
- Managing native grasslands to maintain biodiversity and conserve the plains-wanderer. 1993
- The Black-Eared Miner: A Decade of Recovery. 2008
