= Shannon Moore =

American professional wrestler (born 1979)

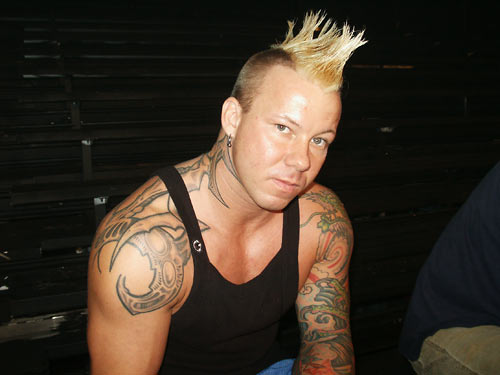
- Moore in 2005

Personal information
- Born: July 27, 1979 (age 47) Asheboro, North Carolina, U.S.

Professional wrestling career
- Ring name(s): El Gran Luchadore; Kid Dynamo; Shannon Moore; Prince of Punk
- Billed height: 5 ft 9 in (175 cm)
- Billed weight: 207 lb (94 kg)
- Billed from: Cameron, North Carolina; Whispering Pines, North Carolina
- Trained by: Matt Hardy; Jeff Hardy
- Debut: April 8, 1995

Shannon Moore (born July 27, 1979) is an American professional wrestler. He is best known for his work with World Championship Wrestling (WCW) between 1999 and 2001 and with World Wrestling Entertainment (WWE) for several years in the 2000s. He has also previously worked for Total Nonstop Action Wrestling (TNA).

Moore befriended Matt and Jeff Hardy as a child, and they later trained him to wrestle. He debuted in 1995 and competed for several North Carolina–based promotions, winning several Light Heavyweight Championships. He also wrestled for the Hardys' promotion, Organization of Modern Extreme Grappling Arts (OMEGA), where he won the OMEGA Light Heavyweight Championship twice and the OMEGA New Frontiers Championship once. In 1999, he signed with WCW, and became part of 3 Count, a boy band parody. The three members of 3 Count jointly won the WCW Hardcore Championship in 2000. In 2001, he briefly held the NWA Wildside Tag Team Championship with Shane Helms.

He later joined the then-WWF in 2001 and was assigned to Heartland Wrestling Association, a developmental territory, where he won the HWA Tag Team Championship with Evan Karagias. After debuting on the SmackDown brand, he became a follower of 'Mattitude' and appeared regularly as Matt Hardy's sidekick. Between late 2003 and 2005, Moore was used mainly in WWE's cruiserweight division, until his release in July 2005. After a stint on the independent circuit, Moore joined TNA in December 2005. In March 2006, he re-signed with WWE, initially appearing on the ECW brand, before returning to SmackDown in 2007. He formed a tag team with Jimmy Wang Yang, and the pair challenged unsuccessfully for the WWE Tag Team Championship on several occasions. Following his release in August 2008, he once again returned to the independent circuit, before rejoining TNA in January 2010. He soon formed a tag team, known as Ink Inc., with Jesse Neal in April.

Aside from wrestling, Moore is also a tattoo artist and owned a tattoo parlor known as Gas Chamber Ink in Southern Pines, North Carolina. He is also a musician, having written his own entrance music, and was part of the band Peroxwhy?gen with Jeff Hardy.

== Professional wrestling career ==
=== Early career (1995–1999) ===
Moore befriended Matt and Jeff Hardy as a child and competed in their own backyard wrestling circuit. After the Hardy brothers began wrestling professionally, they trained Moore and he debuted on April 8, 1995, against Jeff. Moore began working on the independent circuit, wrestling for the North Carolina-based Southern Championship Wrestling and National Championship Wrestling promotions as "Kid Dynamo", and won the Light Heavyweight Championship in both. In addition, he frequently wrestled for Organization of Modern Extreme Grappling Arts (OMEGA), the promotion operated by the Hardys. In OMEGA, he won the OMEGA New Frontiers Championship once, and the OMEGA Light Heavyweight Championship on two occasions. During his time in OMEGA, he met Gregory Shane Helms, and the pair later formed the Bad Street Boys with Christian York and Joey Matthews in NWA Worldwide. In the late 1990s, Moore began wrestling for the Tennessee-based Music City Wrestling promotion.

=== World Championship Wrestling (1999–2001) ===
In 1999, Moore was hired by World Championship Wrestling (WCW) by Chris Kanyon, who had been granted the authority to employ twenty-one young cruiserweights for the Atlanta-based promotion. He was placed in a faction known as "3 Count" by Jimmy Hart. 3 Count, which consisted of Moore, Evan Karagias and Shane Helms, was a trio of young male wrestlers who utilized a boy band gimmick, parodying bands like the Backstreet Boys and 'N Sync. 3 Count debuted in WCW in November 1999. and they began lip synching the song "Can't Get You Out Of My Heart" in the ring before their matches. On the February 28, 2000, episode of WCW Monday Nitro in Minneapolis, Minnesota, all three members of 3 Count defeated Brian Knobs to win the WCW Hardcore Championship with all 3 members of the team simultaneously pinning him. 3 Count reigned as "co-champions" until March 19, at Uncensored where Knobs regained the title by pinning all three men consecutively.

3 Count were not involved in the Millionaire's Club versus The New Blood angle that took place in mid-2000 because Helms was legitimately sidelined with a broken nose. When the team reconvened late in the summer of 2000, they began performing a new song, "Dance With 3 Count". In storyline, Ultimate Fighting Championship mixed martial artist Tank Abbott became an avid fan of 3 Count, and he began protecting them during their performances, attacking anyone who disrupted them, eventually acting as their talent manager and occasional inserting himself as a back-up dancer. 3 Count were involved with a long-running feud (scripted rivalry) with The Jung Dragons, with the Dragons attempting to steal 3 Count's fictional recording contract. This led to a ladder match between the two teams at New Blood Rising, which 3 Count won due to Abbott's interference. As a result, Abbott claimed that he should be the lead singer of 3 Count, and was kicked out by the other three members, leading to a feud. Following this, 3 Count briefly feuded with Misfits In Action.

In late 2000, 3 Count began to fall apart, with Moore and Helms kicking Karagias out of the group for continually stealing the spotlight. Karagias joined forces with former Jung Dragons member Jamie Knoble and the three teams met in a Triangle match at Mayhem, which 3 Count won. At Starrcade, the six men faced off in a ladder match for the number contendership to the WCW Cruiserweight Championship. Both Moore and Helms grabbed the contract at the same time, and later wrestled for the opportunity to face the champion, which Helms won.

In 2001, Moore and Helms briefly appeared in NWA Wildside, where they held the NWA Wildside Tag Team Championship for a single day, after defeating Suicidal Tendencies (John Phoenix and Adam Jacobs) on January 19, 2001. Moore and Helms both participated in a cruiserweight elimination match at SuperBrawl Revenge on February 18, in which Helms eliminated Moore and went on to win the match. Following the match, Moore and former partner Karagias attacked Helms. Moore and Karagias joined forces once again to take part in a tournament for the WCW Cruiserweight Tag Team Championship, but were eliminated by Billy Kidman and Rey Mysterio

=== World Wrestling Federation/ Entertainment (2001–2005) ===
==== Developmental (2001–2002) ====
In March 2001, the World Wrestling Federation purchased WCW, which included Moore's contract. Moore was assigned to the Heartland Wrestling Association (HWA), a Louisville-based WWF developmental territory. There, he teamed with Evan Karagias, and the two won the HWA Tag Team Championship on October 13, 2001, by defeating Dean and Chet Jablonski. They held the championship for a month, before losing it to The Island Boyz on November 14. In early 2002, Moore won the HWA Cruiserweight Championship on two occasions.

==== Mattitude follower (2002–2003) ====
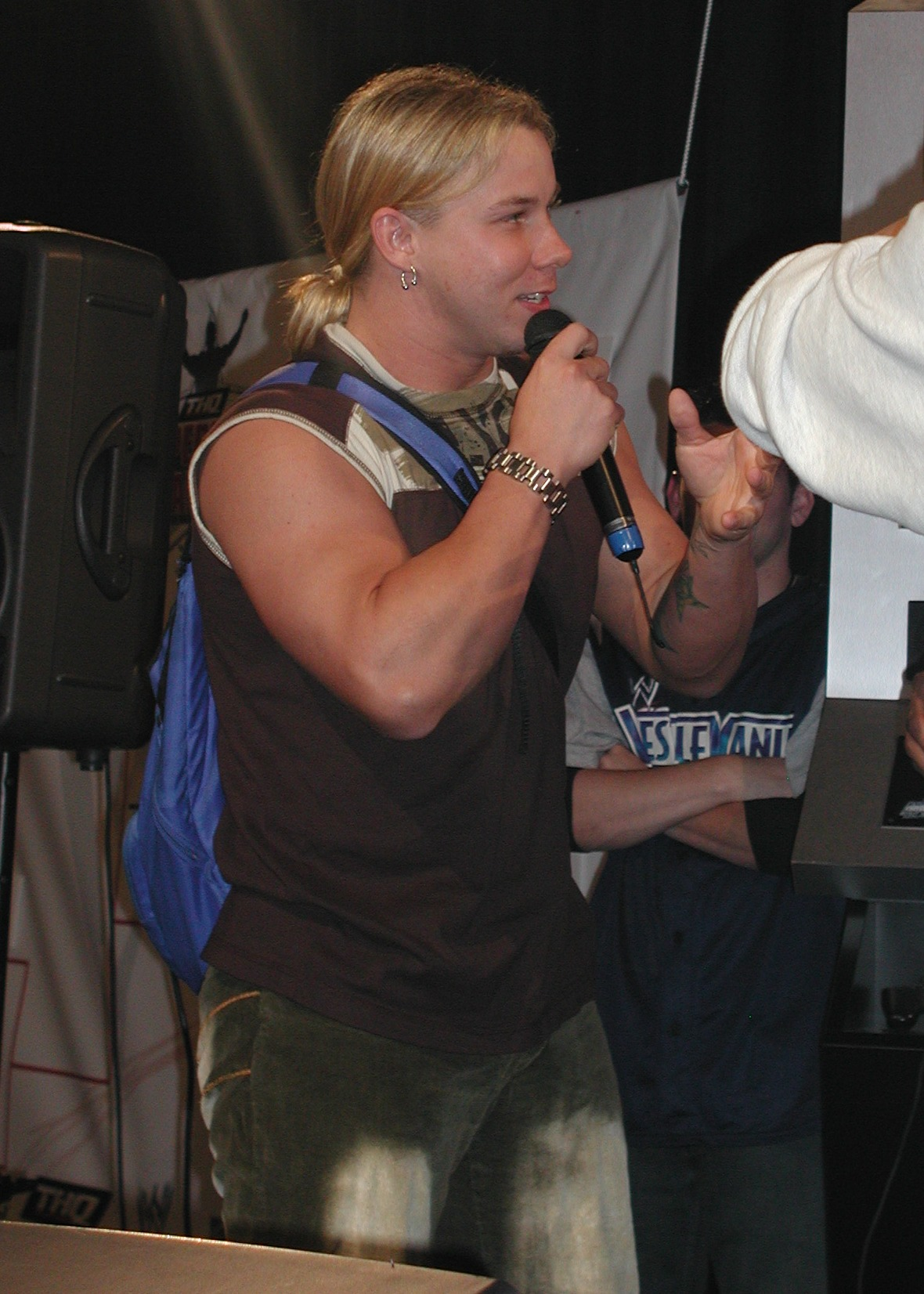
Moore in March 2003 at WWE Fan Axxess

In July 2002, Moore was assigned to the SmackDown! brand, initially appearing on Velocity. In December, Moore became a heel (villainous) acolyte of Matt Hardy, who had begun proselytizing a philosophy known as "Mattitude" and calling himself "Matt Hardy Version 1.0". Moore became a "Mattitude Follower" (abbreviated "MF'er") and started dressing like Hardy, accompanying him to ringside and interfering in his matches. Moore helped Hardy to lose several pounds in order to qualify for a WWE Cruiserweight Championship match at No Way Out. During the championship match, Moore distracted champion Billy Kidman to enable Hardy to get the win and the championship. On April 24, Crash Holly was revealed as the newest MF'er. He was subordinate to Moore and, as such, was referred to as a "Moore-on". When Hardy was displeased with either Moore or Holly, he would physically attack them. Holly was later released from WWE on June 30. On September 23, Moore and Hardy challenged Los Guerreros for the WWE Tag Team Championship, but were unsuccessful.

==== Singles competition (2003–2005) ====
Moore and Hardy continued to work together until November 17, when Hardy left SmackDown! and joined the Raw brand. As a result, Paul Heyman, SmackDown!'s then-general manager, decided to punish Hardy vicariously for leaving his show by forcing Moore to face a series of much larger opponents. In successive weeks, Moore was squashed by Matt Morgan, Nathan Jones, and The Big Show before unexpectedly defeating A-Train in an upset on the December 11 episode of SmackDown!. The following week, WWE Champion Brock Lesnar was scheduled to defend the championship against a wrestler chosen by a lottery machine, which produced Moore's name. After defeating Moore, Lesnar revealed that the process had been rigged, and Moore's name was on all the balls. Immediately afterward, Moore teamed with Hardcore Holly to defeat A-Train and Morgan, earning Holly a championship match against Lesnar. In 2004, at WrestleMania XX Moore took part in a "Cruiserweight Open" for the Cruiserweight Championship, but was eliminated by Último Dragón. His next high profile appearance was on the July 8 episode of SmackDown!, which saw Moore wrestle under a mask as "El Gran Luchadore" to face John "Bradshaw" Layfield (JBL) in the match for the WWE Championship. Initially Moore was dominated by his much larger opponent, but a second Luchadore (the disguised Eddie Guerrero) took Moore's place, prompting Layfield to run away and giving Moore the victory by countout. For the remainder of 2004 and early 2005, Moore competed in the cruiserweight division and on Velocity. Moore received a WWE Championship match on the December 30, 2004, episode of SmackDown, but was quickly defeated by JBL. Moore appeared at the No Way Out pay-per-view in February 2005, competing in a gauntlet match for the Cruiserweight Championship, but was eliminated by Paul London.

On March 21 he suffered a concussion and whiplash after his Hummer was involved in a head-on collision with a vehicle driven by an inebriated United States Army Sergeant in Fort Bragg, North Carolina. He quickly recovered from his injuries, but was released by WWE on July 5.

=== Independent circuit (2005–2006) ===
Moore returned to the independent circuit soon thereafter, although the no-compete clause in his contract (which prohibits WWE employees who are fired or who negotiate a contract release from appearing on television within a given time period) did not expire until November 1 of that year. Moore appeared at an AWA Superstars of Wrestling show, competing in a tournament for the WSL World Light Heavyweight Championship. Moore defeated Dexter Poindexter, Ricky Landell, and "Amazing" N8 Mattson before losing to "Krazy K" Kirby Mack in the finals. Over the next few months, he wrestled Davey Richards at a Pro Wrestling WAR event, J.J. Perez at an All Pro Wrestling show, and Sonjay Dutt at Universal Uproar. He also wrestled A.J. Styles on a United Wrestling Association charity show on February 2, 2006.

During this time, Moore opened a professional wrestling school known as the "School of Punk".

=== Total Nonstop Action Wrestling (2005–2006) ===
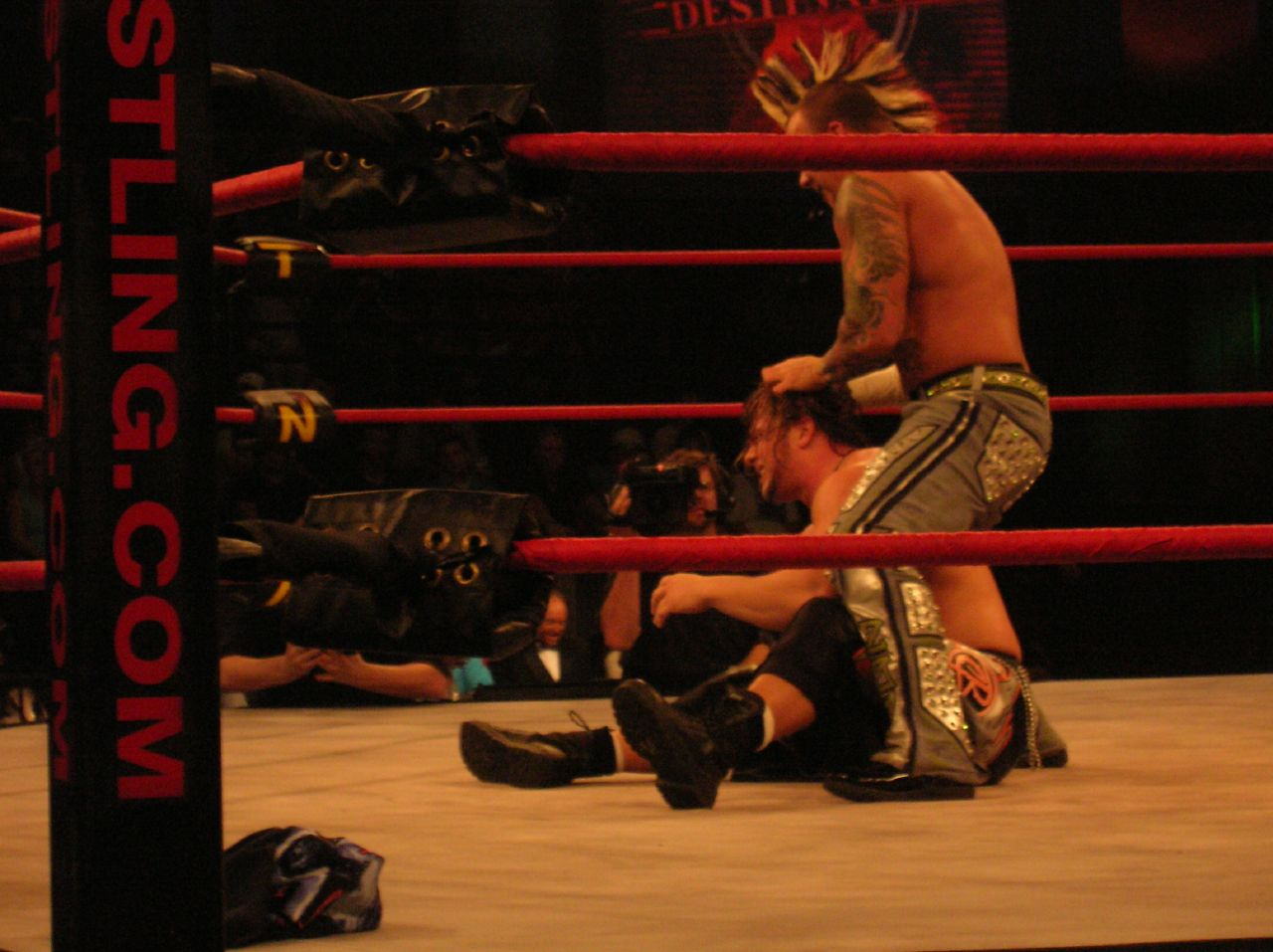
Moore competing in TNA in March 2006

Moore made his Total Nonstop Action Wrestling (TNA) television debut on the December 17 episode of Impact!, appearing in the rafters of the Impact Zone and holding a sign reading "X Division needs to get Punk'd". Upon joining the roster, he gained the nickname the "Prince of Punk". He appeared again in the rafters on the following episode of Impact!.

On the December 31 episode, Moore was seen standing on the stage once again, before he attacked A.J. Styles during a tag team match on the special midnight episode of Impact!, preventing him from winning the NWA World Tag Team Championship with Christopher Daniels. This attack prompted a feud between Moore and Styles, with Moore stalking Styles, attacking him and stealing his "Mr. TNA" award plaque. This led to a street fight between the two, which Moore won. On the February 18 episode of Impact!, Moore faced Roderick Strong and Jay Lethal in a three-way match for a place on Team USA, but the match was won by Lethal. Moore then teamed with Samoa Joe to defeat Styles and Daniels. Moore's final match as part of TNA aired on the March 18 episode of Impact!, when he, America's Most Wanted (Chris Harris and James Storm) and Alex Shelley lost to Styles, Daniels, Ron Killings, and Rhino.

=== Return to WWE (2006–2008) ===
==== Prince of Punk (2006–2007) ====
On March 17, 2006, WWE released an interview with Moore talking about his imminent return to the company. In July 2006, Moore began appearing as part of WWE's ECW brand, making his first appearances in vignettes calling himself "The Reject". His in-ring debut was a loss to CM Punk on September 12, a week before Punk had confronted Moore and called him a "poser" before slapping him. After one more loss to Punk, Moore made only sporadic appearances throughout the rest of 2006 and early 2007, losing each time.

On the February 16, 2007, episode of SmackDown! Moore suddenly switched brands, appearing in an in-ring brawl with other SmackDown! cruiserweights, which was a prelude to a Cruiserweight Open at No Way Out. Moore was eliminated from the Cruiserweight Open by the defending WWE Cruiserweight Champion Gregory Helms. Moore then established himself as a fan favorite by teaming with Scotty 2 Hotty and Jimmy Wang Yang to defeat Helms, Chavo Guerrero Jr., and Daivari in a six-man tag team match.

Following a hiatus from television, Moore returned on the June 15 episode of SmackDown!, competing in a fatal four-way number one contender match for the Cruiserweight Championship, which was won by Wang Yang and also involved Daivari and Jamie Noble. The following week, Moore teamed with Wang Yang in a losing effort against Guerrero and Noble. Moore competed in the 20-man battle royal for the World Heavyweight Championship in July, but was the third person to be eliminated. He also competed in the "Cruiserweight Open" at The Great American Bash along with Noble, Funaki, Wang Yang, and Guerrero. The match was inadvertently won by Hornswoggle. He also faced Noble and Guerrero, in losing efforts. Moore began feuding with Noble, appearing in several backstage vignettes together, where he mocked Noble for his obsession with Hornswoggle. Moore defeated Noble on the September 14 episode of SmackDown!, by pretending that Hornswoggle was at ringside, distracting Noble and allowing Moore to pin him for the victory. In a rematch two weeks later, Noble pinned Moore.

==== Teaming with Jimmy Wang Yang and Departure (2007–2008) ====
In October 2007, Moore formed a tag team with Yang, with the two defeating Deuce 'n Domino. They later competed in a tag team battle royal to determine the number one contenders to the WWE Tag Team Championship on the November 9 episode of SmackDown, but were the second team eliminated. In December, Moore and Yang challenged John Morrison and the Miz for the WWE Tag Team Championship, but were unsuccessful, igniting a feud between the two teams. The following week on ECW, Moore and Yang defeated Morrison and The Miz in a non-title match, to earn a rematch for the championship. On January 1, 2008, Moore and Wang Yang once again beat Morrison and the Miz, this time in a six-person tag team match also involving Layla and Kelly Kelly. The following week, in a Fifteen Minutes of Fame Match, Moore and Wang Yang tied the champions on pinfalls, meaning Miz and Morrison retained the championship. Throughout late January and February, Moore and Yang moved into a feud with Deuce 'n Domino, defeating them two weeks in a row. On the February 15 episode of SmackDown, Moore, Yang, and Jesse and Festus defeated Deuce 'n Domino and Curt Hawkins and Zack Ryder in an eight-man tag team match on SmackDown. In April, Moore and Yang reignited their feud with Morrison and The Miz, losing to them twice in tag team encounters. Yang and Moore went on to win singles matches against Morrison and The Miz respectively, earning another match for the WWE Tag Team Championship on the May 2 episode of SmackDown, but were unsuccessful once again.

After this feud ended, Moore was rarely utilized. On August 8, 2008, WWE announced that Moore had been released from his WWE contract.

=== Return to independent circuit (2008–2009) ===
On September 28, 2008, Moore won the World Stars of Wrestling World Championship by defeating Joe E. Legend. Two months later, on November 22, Moore won the Free-Style Championship Wrestling World Heavyweight Championship by defeating Mot Van Kunder; however, he lost it immediately afterwards to Rico Bushido.

In mid-2009, Moore took a six-month hiatus from wrestling.

During November, Moore participated in the Hulkamania tour of Australia, where he took part in a best of three match series for a prize of US$25,000 with Spartan 3000. Spartan won the first match on November 21, and Moore won the second on November 24. The rubber match ended in a draw on November 26, resulting in a ladder match for the final match of the tour, which Spartan won.

=== Return to TNA (2010–2012) ===
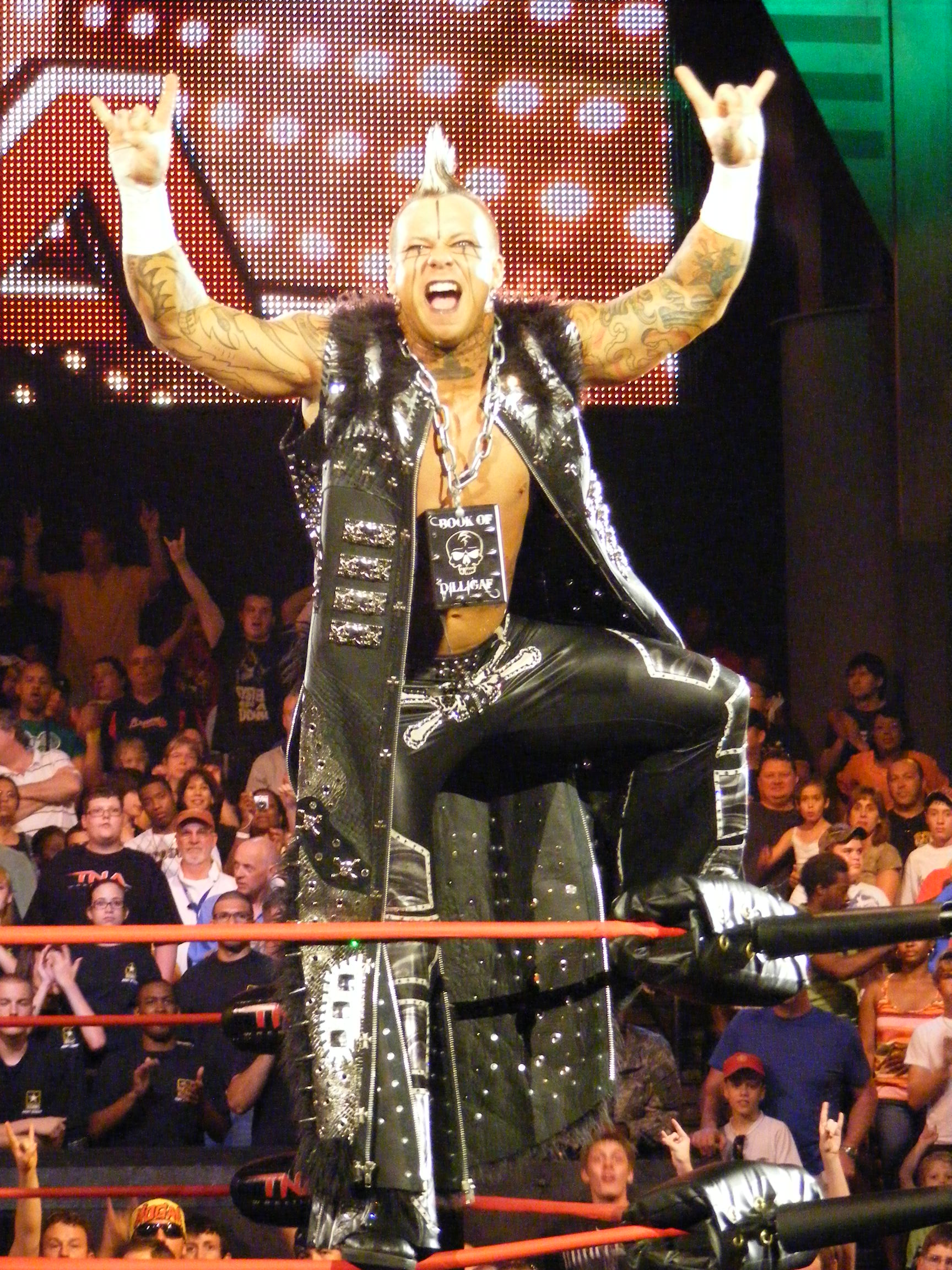
Moore posing in the ring in April 2010

On the first live Monday edition of Impact! on January 4, 2010, Moore made his return to TNA by celebrating backstage with Jeff Hardy, after Hardy had also made his return to the company. On February 19, Dixie Carter confirmed that Moore had signed a new contract with TNA. On the March 8 episode of Impact!, Moore attacked the TNA X Division Champion Doug Williams, and Eric Bischoff announced that Moore would face Williams for the X Division Championship at Destination X. At the pay-per-view Williams retained his title, after hitting Moore with a brick. Moore's first victory since his return to TNA came on the March 29 episode of Impact! in a tag team match when he pinned Brian Kendrick. At Lockdown Moore received another shot at the now vacant X Division Championship in a three-way steel cage match, where he faced Homicide and the eventual winner of the match, Kazarian.

In April, Moore insulted the TNA World Tag Team Champion Matt Morgan, provoking a rivalry between the two. The following week Morgan cost Moore his shot at the TNA X Division Championship, and later attacked his tag team partner Jesse Neal. Moore aided Neal, prompting the pair to form a tag team known as Ink Inc. At Sacrifice Ink Inc. failed in their attempt to win the TNA World Tag Team Championship from The Band (Kevin Nash and Scott Hall), when Neal's trainer Brother Ray interfered in the match and attacked Neal. The following month, on the June 17 episode of Impact!, Ink Inc. defeated The Band (Kevin Nash and Eric Young) to advance to the finals of a tournament for the vacant TNA World Tag Team Championship. In the final, Ink Inc. was defeated by Beer Money, Inc. when Brother Ray attacked Neal backstage prior to the match. At Bound for Glory, Ink Inc. defeated Eric Young and Orlando Jordan. On the October 28 episode of Impact!, Ink Inc. received a match for the TNA World Tag Team Championship against The Motor City Machine Guns in a three-way match, which also included Generation Me (Max and Jeremy Buck), but failed to win the championship. On December 5 at the Final Resolution pay-per-view, Ink Inc. lost to Beer Money, Inc. in a number one contender's match for the TNA World Tag Team Championship. Ink Inc. received a match for Beer Money's TNA World Tag Team Championship at Victory Road in March 2011, but were unsuccessful. After the match Moore turned heel by refusing to shake hands with the champions and instead spat beer in Storm's face. On April 17 at Lockdown, Ink Inc. defeated The British Invasion (Douglas Williams and Magnus), Crimson and Scott Steiner and Eric Young and Orlando Jordan in a four team steel cage match to become the number one contenders to the TNA World Tag Team Championship. The following month at Sacrifice, Ink Inc. was defeated by Mexican America (Anarquia and Hernandez). During the match, Neal suffered a neck injury, which sidelined him for the next four months.

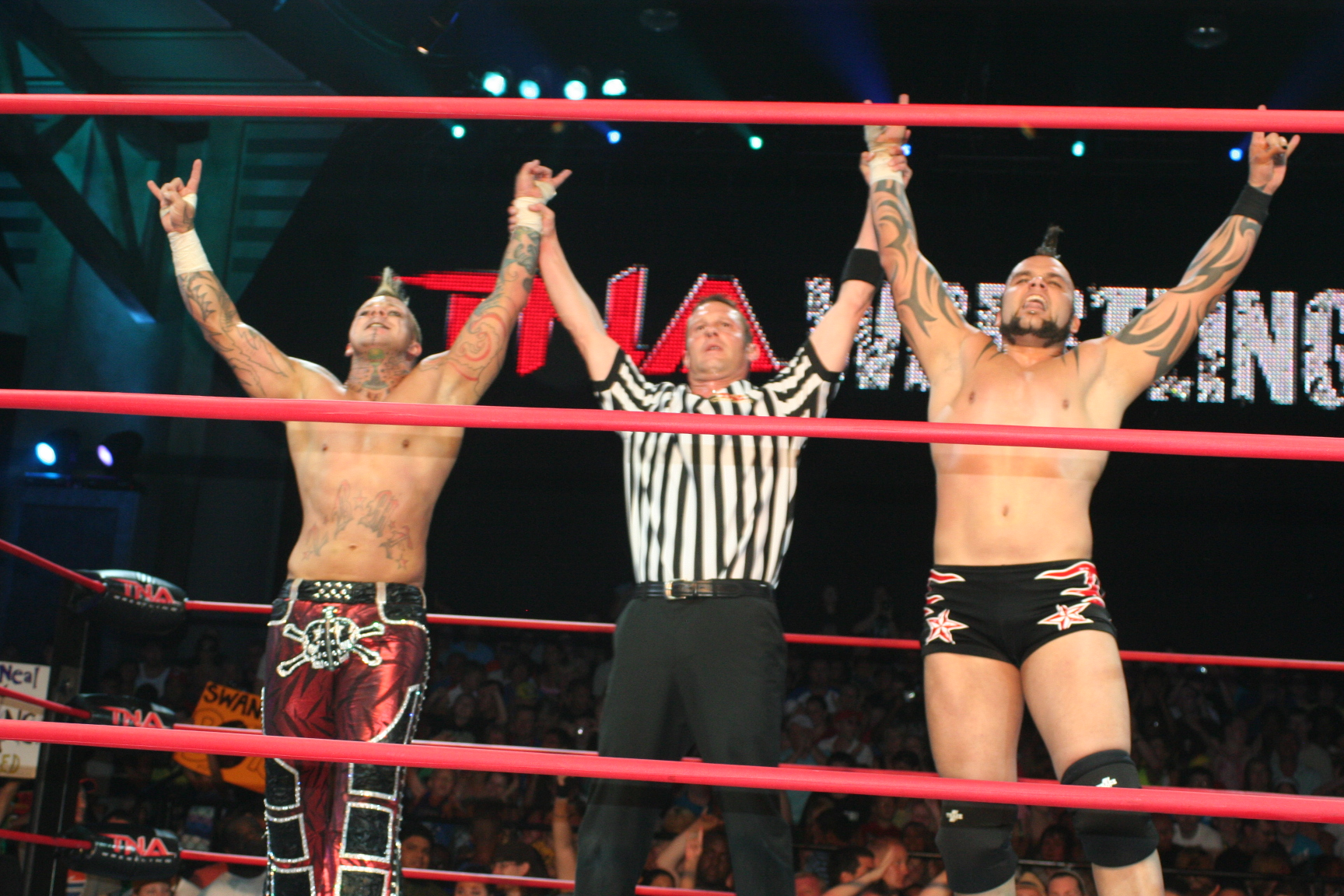
Ink Inc. in July 2010

As a result, Moore returned to singles competition and on July 10 at Destination X, Moore participated in his first Ultimate X match, for a shot at the X Division Championship, but was defeated by Alex Shelley in the match, which also included Amazing Red and Robbie E. Ink Inc. returned on the September 22 episode of Impact Wrestling, attacking Mexican America, now the TNA World Tag Team Champions, at a tattoo parlour. On the October 13 episode of Impact Wrestling, Toxxin aligned herself with Ink Inc. by saving them from Mexican America. On October 16, during the Bound for Glory pre-show, Ink Inc. unsuccessfully challenged Mexican America for the TNA World Tag Team Championship and at Turning Point the following month, they again failed to win the championship in a six-person tag team match, which also included Toxxin and Mexican America's Sarita. In December, Neal parted ways with TNA, effectively dissolving Ink Inc.

On the December 22 episode of Impact Wrestling, Moore teamed up with Anarquia in the Wild Card Tournament but lost to Eric Young and ODB. Following a brief hiatus, Moore returned on February 12, 2012, at Against All Odds, answering Robbie E's open invitational and unsuccessfully challenging him for the TNA Television Championship. On May 31, Moore announced that he would not be returning to TNA due to a neck injury.

=== Second return to independent circuit (2012–present) ===
After leaving TNA in 2012 with a neck injury, Moore did not wrestle for approximately two years, and on July 6, 2014, he announced on Twitter that he is finished with in-ring competition. Despite this, Moore returned to wrestling on December 14, 2014, at Xtreme Intense Championship Wrestling (XICW)'s Hardcore With A Heart; he defeated Hakim Zane to win the XICW Midwest Heavyweight Championship. On January 17, 2015, at Best in Detroit 8 Moore lost the XICW Midwest Heavyweight Title to Rhyno. On December 3, 2016, at Full Throttle Pro Wrestling Event "Fight Club: Round 2" Moore defeated Braydon Knight and became the inaugural FTPW Heavyweight Champion. This was later stripped from Moore. On May 19, 2017, at Atomic Wrestling Entertainment Event "Mayhem" Moore defeated Cj O'Doyle for the AWE Heavyweight Title. On October 16, 2025, he made his ROH debut, losing by submission to Blake Christian.

== Other media ==
Moore was in a band with Jeff Hardy called "Peroxwhy?gen", but later left to concentrate on wrestling. He wrote his own entrance music. Moore is part of Matt and Jeff Hardy's side project, a reality show called The Hardy Show. He also appears on the DVD OMEGA: Uncommon Passion, which details the history of the OMEGA promotion initiative.

== Personal life ==
Moore has been married twice. Moore's first wife, Crystal, was a professional singer, they were married from 2002-2005. In April 2009, Moore married his second wife, Julie Youngberg, a WWE seamstress and divorced in 2017.

Moore has known Jeff and Matt Hardy since around 1987. Moore cites Shawn Michaels, The Rock 'n' Roll Express, André the Giant, and Ultimate Warrior as his influences.

Moore has multiple tattoos including one on the inside of his lip that says "extinct". He also has two tattoos across his fingers saying "Hard Knox" and "Made 1979". In 2005, he had 2BME tattooed on his stomach. He operated a tattoo shop called Gas Chamber Ink in Southern Pines, North Carolina. He also has a total of three piercings; one in each ear and one in his septum.

== Championships and accomplishments ==
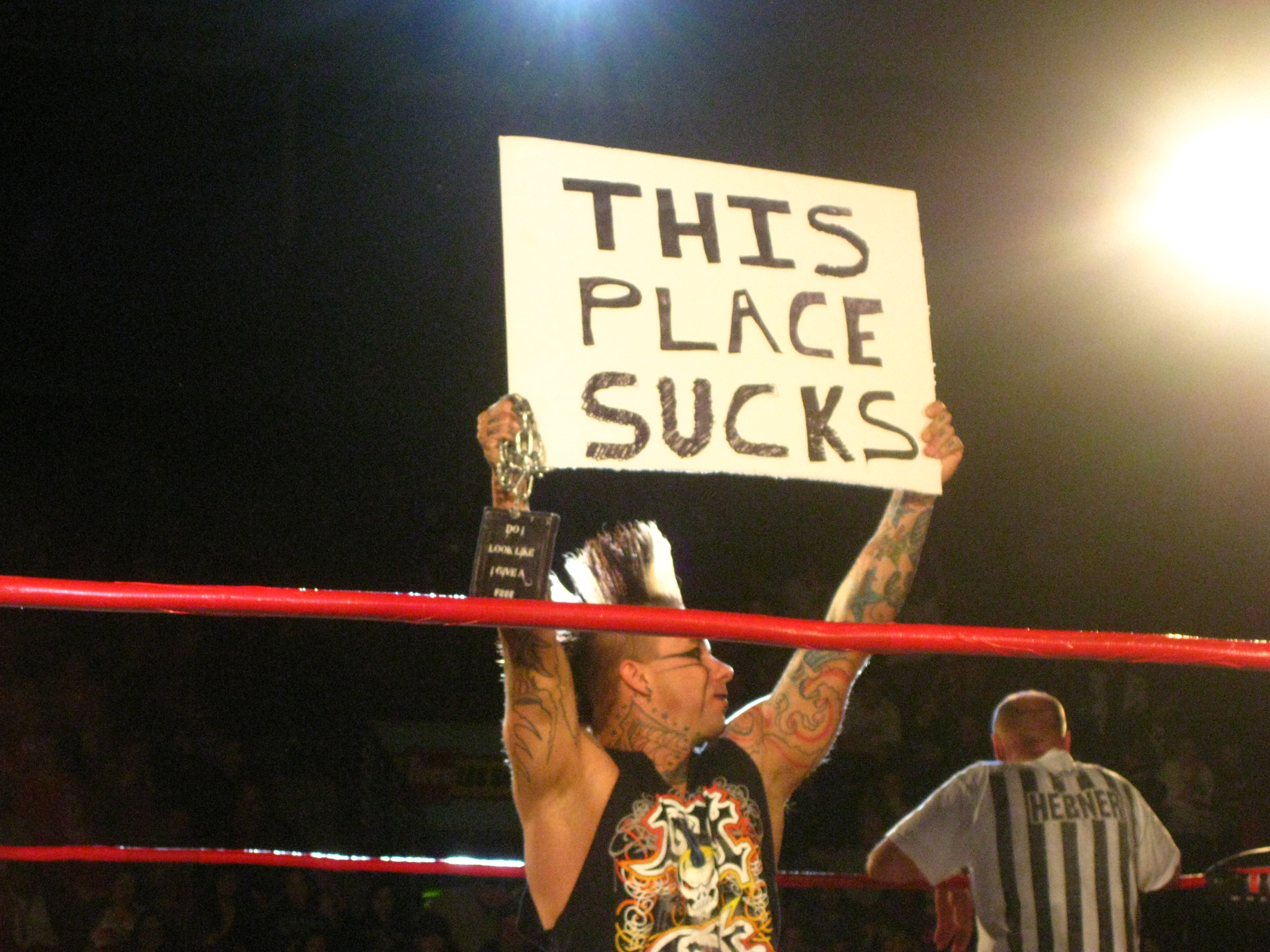
Moore in March 2011

- Atomic Wrestling Entertainment / Atomic Revolutionary Wrestling/Atomic Legacy Wrestling
  - AWE/ARW/ALW Heavyweight Championship (4 times)
  - ARW Next Level Championship (2 times)
  - ARW Rapid Fire Championship (1 time)
  - ARW/ALW Tag Teams Championship (2 times, current) - with Ryzin (1), with Jesse Neal (1) as Ink Inc.
  - ARW Grand Slam Champion
- Full Throttle Pro Wrestling
  - FTPW Heavyweight Championship (1 time)
- Free-Style Championship Wrestling
  - FCW World Heavyweight Championship (1 time)
- Heartland Wrestling Association
  - HWA Cruiserweight Championship (2 times)
  - HWA Tag Team Championship (1 time) – with Evan Karagias
- New Frontier Wrestling Alliance
  - NFWA Heavyweight Championship (1 time)
  - NFWA Tag Team Championship (1 time) – with Carolina Warrior
- NWA Wildside / National Championship Wrestling
  - NCW Light Heavyweight Championship (1 time)
  - NWA Wildside Tag Team Championship (1 time) – with Shane Helms
- Organization of Modern Extreme Grappling Arts
  - OMEGA Light Heavyweight Championship (2 times)
  - OMEGA New Frontiers Championship (1 time)
- Pro Wrestling Illustrated
  - PWI ranked him 67 of the top 500 singles wrestlers of the year in the PWI 500 in 2002
- Revolution Wrestling Authority
  - RWA World Heavyweight Championship (1 time)
- Southern Championship Wrestling
  - SCW Light Heavyweight Championship (1 time)
- World Championship Wrestling
  - WCW Hardcore Championship (1 time)^{[a]}
- World Stars of Wrestling
  - WSW World Heavyweight Championship (1 time)
- Xtreme Intense Championship Wrestling
  - XICW Midwest Heavyweight Championship (1 time)

== Footnotes ==
- ^{a} The WCW Hardcore Championship was held jointly with Evan Karagias and Shane Helms as a member of 3 Count using the Freebird Rule.
