= El Gran Luchadore =

Fictional professional wrestler

- First appearance: WWE SmackDown (April 22, 2004)
- Last appearance: SmackDown Live (February 20, 2017)
- Created by: WWE

El Gran Luchadore (loosely translated from Spanish to "The Great Fighter/Wrestler," "Luchadore" is also an incorrect spelling, luchador is the correct spelling) is a professional wrestling character who appeared in World Wrestling Entertainment in the SmackDown! brand in 2004. El Gran Luchadore was mainly used as a jobber to put over other wrestlers.

== Character history ==
The first WWE wrestler to wrestle as the El Gran Luchadore was Paul London on April 22, 2004, in a singles match against John "Bradshaw" Layfield. El Gran Luchadore was presented by SmackDown General Manager Paul Heyman as the Mexican Heavyweight Champion, but the match was a squash where JBL won. Next up was Shannon Moore on July 8, 2004, billed as the "champion of Mexico", would face the new WWE Champion JBL in a non-title match. During the match, the former WWE Champion Eddie Guerrero interfered and allowed El Gran Luchadore to defeat JBL. The next and final appearance of El Gran Luchadore on July 15, 2004, edition of SmackDown!. During a Steel Cage match between Guerrero and JBL which saw both men sat on top of the Cage, exchanging punches until El Gran Luchadore ran down and climbed into the cage, before El Gran Luchadore grabbed Guerrero's leg, and helping JBL to retain the WWE title after he climb down the cage. After the match, Guerrero pulled the mask off of him, and revealing him to be SmackDown! General Manager Kurt Angle.

== Championships and accomplishments ==
- WWE
  - Champion of Mexico Championship (1 time, inaugural, final)

== See also ==
- Doink the Clown
- Los Conquistadores
