= MCW Cruiserweight Championship =

Professional wrestling championship

Details
- Promotion: Maryland Championship Wrestling (MCW)
- Date established: November 8, 1998
- Date retired: November 10, 2010
Statistics
- First champion: Adam Flash
- Final champion: Ryan McBride
- Most reigns: Adam Flash (4 reigns)
- Longest reign: Ryan McBride (487 days)
- Shortest reign: Christian York (<1 day)

The MCW Cruiserweight Championship was a professional wrestling cruiserweight championship owned by the Maryland Championship Wrestling (MCW) promotion. The title was created and debuted on November 8, 1998 at a MCW live event. The title is currently inactive.

The inaugural champion was Gregory Martin, who defeated Ronnie Zukko in the finals of a tournament to win the championship on February 12, 2001 at an MCW live event.

== Title history ==
Key
No.	Overall reign number
Reign	Reign number for the specific champion
Days	Number of days held
+	Current reign is changing daily

No.	Champion	Championship change			Reign statistics		Notes	Ref.
No.	Champion	Date	Event	Location	Reign	Days	Notes	Ref.
Maryland Championship Wrestling (MCW)
1	Adam Flash	November 8, 1998	Live event	Glen Burnie, MD	1	24	Flash defeated Rearl the Pearl to become the first champion.	
—	Vacated	December 2, 1998	N/A	Glen Burnie, MD	—	—	Flash vacated the title due to injury.	
2	Christian York	December 2, 1998	Live event	Glen Burnie, MD	1	170	York defeated Tom Brandi to win the vacant title.	
3	Joey Matthews	May 21, 1999		Wheaton, MD	1	27		
4	Platinum Nat	June 17, 1999		Dundalk, MD	1	108		
5	Quinn Nash	October 3, 1999		Dundalk, MD	1	20		
6	Adam Flash	October 23, 1999		Colonial Beach, VA	2	4		
7	Quinn Nash	October 27, 1999		Glen Burnie, MD	2	38		
8	Mikey Whipwreck	December 4, 1999		Dandy Spring, MD	1	1		
9	Adam Flash	December 5, 1999		Dundalk, MD	3	131		
10	Chad Bowman	April 14, 2000	—	Annapolis, MD	1	219	Defeated Adam Flash and Qeenan Creed in a three-way match.	
11	Qeenan Creed	November 19, 2000		Odenton, MD	1	55		
12	Gregory Martin	January 13, 2001		Laurel, DE	1	56		
13	Qeenan Creed	March 10, 2001		Paw Paw, WV	2	382		
14	Amazing Red	March 27, 2002		Glen Burnie, MD	1	253		
15	2-Dope	December 5, 2002		Glen Burnie, MD	1	97		
16	Adam Flash	March 12, 2003		Glen Burnie, MD	4	64		
17	Reckless Youth	May 15, 2003		Glen Burnie, MD	1	62		
18	Christian York	July 16, 2003		Glen Burnie, MD	2	0		
—	Deactivated	July 16, 2003		Glen Burnie, MD			MCW closed	
19	Derek Frazier	February 26, 2006	—	Dundalk, MD	1	70	Defeated Andrew Ryker after MCW reopened earlier in the month.	
20	Chris Sabin	May 7, 2006		Dundalk, MD	1	63		
21	Ruckus	July 9, 2006	—	Dundalk, MD	1	112	Defeated Derek Frazier, Jerry Lynn, Chris Sabin, Steve Anthony and Petey Williams in the 6-way Shane Shamrock Memorial Cup final to win the title.	
22	Chris Sabin	October 29, 2006		Dundalk, MD	2	13		
23	Alex Shelley	November 11, 2006		Hampstead, MD	1	134		
24	Derek Frazier	March 25, 2007		Dundalk, MD	2	276		
25	Josh Daniels	December 26, 2007		Glen Burnie, MD	1	311		
—	Vacated	November 2, 2008	N/A		—	—		
26	Sabian	November 2, 2008		Dundalk, MD	1	161		
—	Vacated	April 11, 2009	N/A		—	—		
27	Ryan McBride	July 11, 2009		Dundalk, MD	1	487		
—	Deactivated	November 10, 2010			—	—		

== Combined reigns ==
As of June 1, 2026.

Rank	Wrestler	# of reigns	Combined days
1	Ryan McBride	1	487
2	Qeenan Creed	2	437
3	Derek Frazier	2	346
4	Josh Daniels	1	311
5	Ruckus	1	258
6	Adam Flash	4	223
7	Chad Bowman	1	219
8	Christian York	2	170
9	Sabian	1	161
10	Ruckus	1	112
11	Platinum Nat	1	108
12	2-Dope	1	97
13	Chris Sabin	2	73
14	Quinn Nash	2	58
15	Gregory Martin	1	56
16	Joey Matthews	1	27
17	Mikey Whipwreck	1	1

== Notes ==
1. – Each reign is ranked highest to lowest; reigns with the same number mean that they are tied for that certain rank.
