= SCW Junior Heavyweight Championship =

Professional wrestling championship

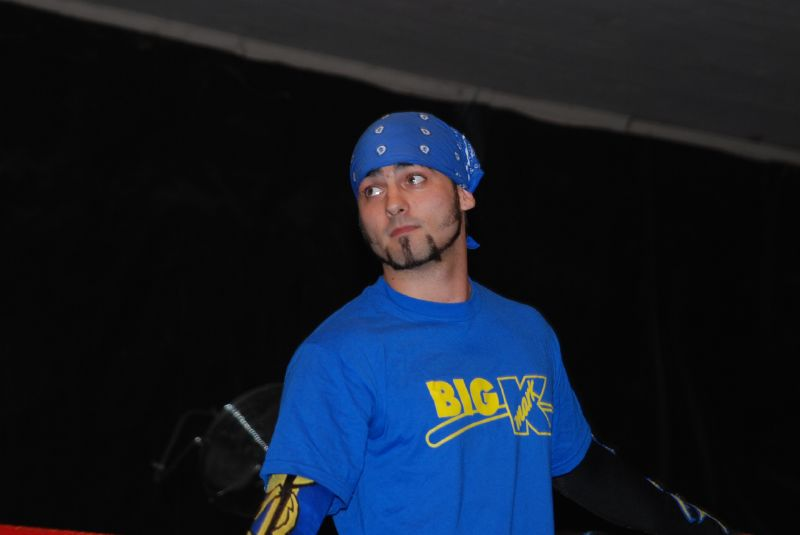
- Krazy K was the final SCW Junior Heavyweight Champion.

Details
- Promotion: Southern Championship Wrestling
- Date established: February 22, 1997
- Date retired: November 20, 2004
Statistics
- First champion: Chris Cannon
- Final champions: Krazy K (won November 20, 2004)
- Most reigns: Joey Matthews (3)
- Longest reign: Chris Cannon (268 days)
- Shortest reign: Krazy K (<1 day)

The SCW Junior Heavyweight Championship was a professional wrestling light heavyweight championship in Southern Championship Wrestling (SCW). It was defended in the promotion from 1997 to 2000, and briefly reactivated on November 20, 2004, when SCW held its final show.

The inaugural champion was "The Iceman" Chris Cannon, who defeated Preston Quinn in a tournament final on February 22, 1997, to become the first SCW Heavyweight Champion. Joey Matthews holds the record for most reigns, with three. At 268 days, Chris Cannon's first and only reign is the longest in the title's history. Krazy K's reign was the shortest in the history of the title as it was won on the promotion's final show. Overall, there have been 12 reigns shared between 8 wrestlers, with three vacancies, and 2 deactivations.

== Title history ==
Key

#	Order in reign history
Reign	The reign number for the specific set of wrestlers listed
Event	The event in which the title was won
—	Used for vacated reigns so as not to count it as an official reign
N/A	The information is not available or is unknown
+	Indicates the current reign is changing daily

=== Names ===
Name	Years
SCW Junior Heavyweight Championship	1997 — 2000

=== Reigns ===
#	Wrestlers	Reign	Date	Days held	Location	Event	Notes	Ref.
1	Chris Cannon	1	February 22, 1997	268	Butner, North Carolina	Live event	Cannon defeated Preston Quinn in a tournament final to become the first SCW Junior Heavyweight Champion.	
—	Vacated	—	November 17, 1997	—	N/A	N/A	The championship is vacated when Chris Cannon is stripped as champion after failing to appear for a scheduled title defense.	
2	Joey Matthews	1	November 22, 1997	68	Louisburg, North Carolina	Live event	Matthews defeated The Intruder to win the vacant title.	
3	Steve Corino	1	January 29, 1998	50	Raleigh, North Carolina	Live event	This was a Ladder match.	
—	Vacated	—	March 20, 1998	—	N/A	N/A	The championship is vacated when Steve Corino leaves the promotion to join Extreme Championship Wrestling.	
4	Christian York	2	March 26, 1998	43	Raleigh, North Carolina	Live event	York defeated Joey Matthews in a tournament final to win the vacant title.	
5	Joey Matthews	2	May 8, 1998	74	Wendell, North Carolina	Live event		
6	Kid Dynamo	1	July 31, 1998	20	Southern Pines, North Carolina	Live event		
7	Joey Matthews	3	August 20, 1998	93	Raleigh, North Carolina	Live event		
8	Christian York	3	November 21, 1998	215	Louisburg, North Carolina	Live event		
9	Scab	1	June 24, 1999	156	Raleigh, North Carolina	Live event		
10	Tears	1	November 27, 1999	245	Louisburg, North Carolina	Live event		
—	Vacated	—	July 29, 2000	—	Zebulon, North Carolina	Live event	The championship is vacated when Tears is stripped as champion after failing to appear for a scheduled title defense.	
11	William Wealth	1	July 29, 2000	61	Zebulon, North Carolina	Live event	Wealth defeated Jacey North to win the vacant title.	
—	Deactivated	—	September 28, 2000	—	N/A	N/A	The championship is vacated when William Wealth surrenders the title and is subsequently abandoned by the promotion.	
12	Krazy K	1	November 20, 2004	0	Durham, North Carolina	Blowout Bash (2004)	Krazy K defeated Caprice Coleman to win the vacant title.	
—	Deactivated	—	November 20, 2004	—	N/A	N/A	SCW closed on November 20, 2004, and Krazy K was the final champion in SCW as a company.	

== List of combined reigns ==
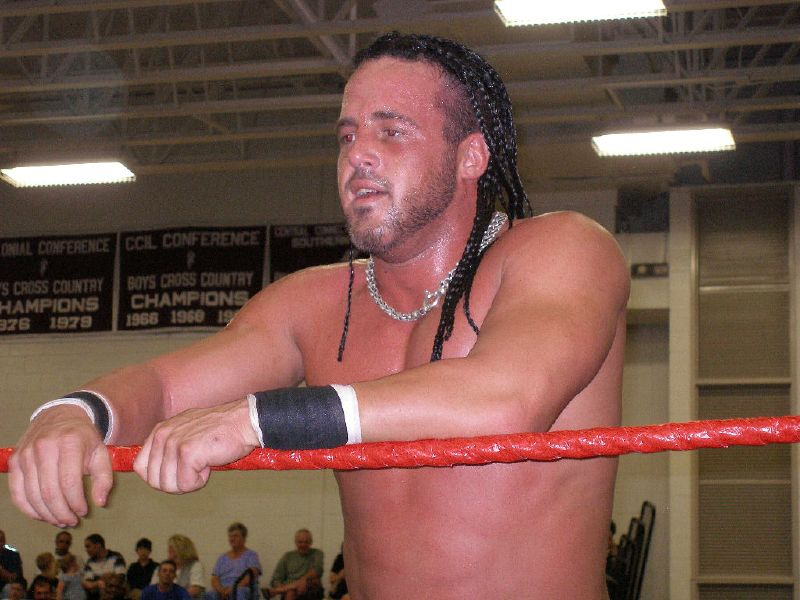
Joey Matthews, who had the most reigns as SCW Junior Heavyweight Champion

<1	Indicates that the reign lasted less than one day.

Rank (Note: Each reign is ranked highest to lowest; reigns with the same number mean that they are tied for that certain rank.)	Wrestler	# of reigns	Combined days
1	Chris Cannon	1	268
2	Christian York	2	258
3	Tears	1	245
4	Joey Matthews	3	235
5	Scab	1	156
6	William Wealth	1	61
7	Steve Corino	1	50
8	Kid Dynamo	1	20
9	Krazy K	1	<1
