= Paul London =

American professional wrestler (born 1980)

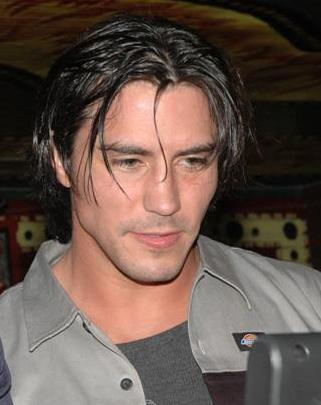
- London in 2007
- Born: Paul Michael London; April 16, 1980 (age 46); Austin, Texas, U.S.
- Occupations: Professional wrestler; actor
- Years active: 2000–present (wrestling); 2020–present (acting)
- Professional wrestling career
- Ring name(s): El Gran Luchadore; El Vegas Dragon; Paul London; Sydistiko
- Billed height: 5 ft 10 in (1.78 m)
- Billed weight: 180 lb (82 kg)
- Billed from: Austin, Texas; Down the Rabbit Hole (LU)
- Trained by: Texas Wrestling Academy; Dory Funk Jr. Ivan Putski; Christopher Daniels
- Debut: 2000

Paul Michael London (born April 16, 1980) is an American professional wrestler. He is best known for his tenure in WWE.

After being trained at the Texas Wrestling Academy, London began competing for Ring of Honor where his high-risk offensive moves made him a fan favorite. He later competed for Total Nonstop Action Wrestling, Pro Wrestling Zero-One, and various independent promotions, winning numerous championships and won the ECWA Super 8 Tournament in 2003.

London made his debut in WWE in late 2003. In 2004 he began teaming with fellow cruiserweight Billy Kidman and they eventually went on to win the WWE Tag Team Championship. After Kidman retired from active competition, London formed a tag team with Brian Kendrick. After their split, London began competing in the cruiserweight division and won the WWE Cruiserweight Championship. In late 2006, Kendrick returned and the two reformed as a team. London and Kendrick were managed by Ashley Massaro. London and Kendrick won the WWE Tag Team Championship, becoming the longest reigning WWE Tag Team Champions since the title's creation and the World Tag Team Championship. The team split when Kendrick was drafted to the SmackDown brand in June 2008 and London was released later that year. In 2009, he returned to the independent circuit, competing for Pro Wrestling Guerrilla, where he was one half of the former PWG World Tag Team Champions with partner El Generico under the team name ¡Peligro Abejas!.

== Early life ==
London was born in Austin, Texas, and has two older brothers, Daniel and Jonathan. In 1996, Daniel was killed by a drunk driver at the age of nineteen. Jonathan is a music video director. London attended Westlake High School in Texas. He helped create the school's first-ever wrestling team where he was the captain, first varsity letterman and previously held the record for the fastest pinfall time of 7.4 seconds, which has since been broken by 2x State Champion Justin Wood at 6.9 seconds.

== Professional wrestling career ==
=== Early career (2000–2003) ===
After graduating from high school, London trained at several wrestling schools, including a trailer park in West Memphis, Arkansas and a school run by Ivan Putski in North Austin, Texas. He debuted in 2000. London made his first appearance at WCW Greed on March 18, 2001, as an audience member during the Diamond Dallas Page and Scott Steiner in a WCW World Heavyweight Championship match. He later enrolled in Shawn Michaels' wrestling school, the Texas Wrestling Academy, where he was trained by Rudy Gonzales. He lost to Perry Saturn on the WWF Jakked on the March 9, 2002 episode. He returned to WWE (formerly WWF), losing to John Cena on the December 7, 2002 episode of WWE Velocity. Early in his career, London made brief appearances in Japanese promotion Pro Wrestling Zero-One (Zero1) and Total Nonstop Action Wrestling (TNA). London competed in Zero1 for several months on a match-by-match basis, beginning in January 2003, before turning down a contract. London was contacted by TNA after ROH's one-year anniversary show, and told that they were interested in him doing some matches on a try-out basis.

=== Ring of Honor (2002–2003) ===
He made his debut in Ring of Honor (ROH) on March 30, 2002, in a match against Chris Marvel. He began a lengthy feud with Michael Shane during a tag team match for ROH contracts on July 27, 2002. During the bout, both Shane and London made simultaneous pinfalls on their opponent's partners. The referee only counted for Shane, giving his team the victory, which led to London and Shane brawling. The two continued to feud over the next several months in matches such as Street Fights (where the crowd chanted "please don't die" due to London's high-risk offense), a Triple Threat match and a Gauntlet match.

On December 7, 2002, London won a tournament to capture the ROH Number One Contender's Trophy, guaranteeing a match for the ROH Championship. He lost the match three weeks later to then-champion Xavier. On February 8, 2003, London competed in a Triple Threat match for the Number One Contender's Trophy, pinning A.J. Styles for the win. After the match, Xavier informed London that he would compete for the title immediately. London again lost to the champion. London's final match in ROH was for the title against Samoa Joe on July 19, 2003, in which he lost.

=== Total Nonstop Action (2003) ===
On February 12, 2003, he made his TNA debut in a Gauntlet match against Jerry Lynn, which he lost. London competed mainly in the company's X Division, even earning shots at the NWA TNA X Division Championship. His last appearance in TNA was on June 18, 2003, at the TNA Anniversary show. He wrestled X Division Champion Chris Sabin for the title, only to lose due to interference from CM Punk. London has said that he viewed his time in TNA as a "stepping stone", but knew that he did not want to be there long-term. London also made several appearances for East Coast Wrestling Association and won the 7th Annual ECWA Super 8 Tournament.

=== World Wrestling Entertainment (2003–2008) ===
==== Cruiserweight Division (2003–2005) ====
London signed with World Wrestling Entertainment (WWE) in mid–2003, working a few dark matches before being sent to the company's developmental territory, Ohio Valley Wrestling, on August 30. London made his official WWE television debut on the SmackDown! brand, losing to Brock Lesnar in a match for the WWE Championship on October 9 in one minute. After the match, Lesnar continued to attack London until fellow cruiserweight Spanky (Brian Kendrick) made the save. The two competed as a tag team on SmackDown!'s sister show Velocity until Spanky left the company in January 2004.

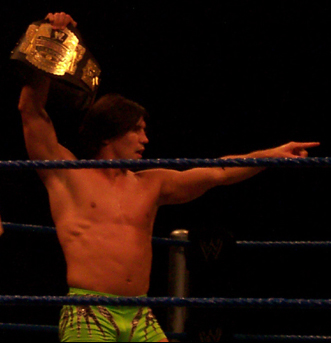
London in 2005 as the WWE Cruiserweight Champion

London then began a tag team with Billy Kidman on the January 29 episode of SmackDown!. On the July 8 episode of SmackDown!, the duo won the WWE Tag Team Championship from the Dudley Boyz. They defended the title against the Dudley Boyz and the Basham Brothers on several occasions before losing the championship to René Duprée and Kenzo Suzuki on the September 9 episode of SmackDown!, due to Kidman leaving London to fight by himself. (Billy Kidman accidentally injured Chavo Guerrero using the shooting star press during a tag team match involving Jamie Noble and Paul London. Kidman felt guilty about using the finishing maneuver until people accused him of being a quitter and before turning heel.) Kidman's heel turn led to a feud between the two, which culminated at No Mercy on October 3 where Kidman defeated London with a shooting star press. After the match, London was bleeding from the mouth and being stretchered when Kidman pulled him back into the ring with the stretcher and delivered another shooting star press to London's injured ribs. This storyline was put in place after London had broken his nose wrestling Booker T and needed time off to recuperate.

London returned on November 27, wrestling on Velocity until the end of the year. On the March 10, 2005 episode of SmackDown!, London became the number one contender for Chavo Guerrero's WWE Cruiserweight Championship, which he later won in a cruiserweight battle royal on the March 31 episode of SmackDown!. Guerrero challenged London for the title at Judgment Day on May 22, where London emerged victorious. During another title match with Guerrero on the June 23 episode of SmackDown!, The Mexicools stormed the ring, attacking both London and Guerrero. On the July 14 episode of SmackDown!, London teamed with Scotty 2 Hotty and Funaki to face The Mexicools. The ending of the match saw Juventud perform the 450° splash on London for the win, but landed his knee onto London's face and legitimately broke his nose in the process. London lost the Cruiserweight Championship on the August 6 episode of Velocity to Nunzio. Later in the night, London cut a heel promo encouraging the fans to protest his title loss. London went on a losing streak before returning as a face and teaming with the newly rehired Brian Kendrick.

==== Teaming with Brian Kendrick (2005–2008) ====
On the December 16 episode of Velocity, London and Kendrick remade their image, wearing theatrical masks to the ring and matching vests and shorts. On the April 7, 2006, episode of SmackDown!, London and Kendrick defeated WWE Tag Team Champions MNM in a non-title match. They developed a winning streak over the champions, including singles victories for both Kendrick and London over Johnny Nitro and Joey Mercury, respectively. London and Kendrick won the WWE Tag Team Championship at Judgment Day on May 21, marking consecutive victories for London and Kendrick over MNM. On the August 11 episode of SmackDown!, K. C. James and Idol Stevens defeated the champions in a non-title match, igniting a feud between the two teams. During the rivalry, WWE Diva Ashley Massaro began accompanying London and Kendrick to the ring to act as a valet and combat the actions of James and Stevens' manager Michelle McCool.

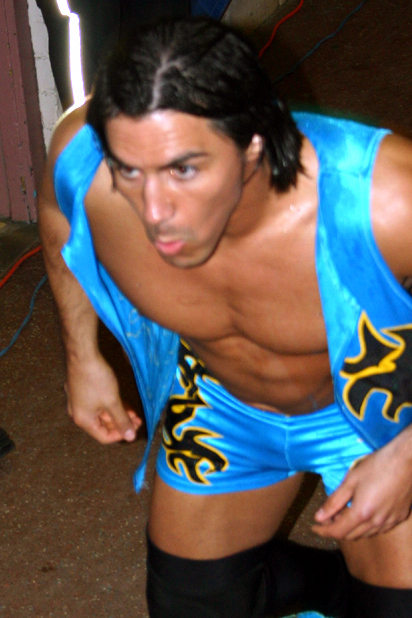
London making his entrance at a WWE house show held in Kitchener, Ontario, Canada, on January 15, 2005

They soon began a losing streak to the team of William Regal and Dave Taylor. Regal defeated both team members in singles matches and on the December 8 episode of SmackDown!, Kendrick and London lost a tag team match to the pair. As a result, they were scheduled to defend the championship against Regal and Taylor at Armageddon on December 17; at Armageddon, the match was changed to a four-way ladder match also involving MNM and The Hardys. London and Kendrick won the match and retained the championship. On the January 12, 2007, episode of SmackDown! London and Kendrick successfully retained their championship against Regal and Taylor in a traditional tag team match.

On the February 2 episode of SmackDown!, London and Kendrick suffered a non-title loss to the rookie team Deuce 'n Domino. A further tag team match loss and a singles loss for Kendrick to Deuce led to a championship match at No Way Out on February 18, in which London and Kendrick were victorious. They retained the championship against MNM on the March 23 episode of SmackDown!, and then retained the championship against Deuce 'n Domino again on the April 13 episode of SmackDown!, after Deuce 'n Domino were disqualified. In a rematch the following week on the April 20 episode of SmackDown!, London and Kendrick lost the WWE Tag Team Championship to Deuce 'n Domino. During the match London missed a moonsault from the ring apron to the floor (kayfabe) injuring his ribs, leaving Kendrick to battle Deuce 'n Domino alone. London and Kendrick's reign was the longest in the championship's history at 331 days until it was surpassed by The New Day in 2016. Selling his storyline injured ribs, London was absent from physical action until the May 11 episode of SmackDown!, when he defeated Domino in singles competition. London and Kendrick unsuccessfully competed for the titles on the June 1 episode of SmackDown! in a triple threat tag team match, which also involved Regal and Taylor, and lost a rematch on the June 15 episode of SmackDown! in a standard tag team match.

Both London and Kendrick were drafted to the Raw brand on June 17, during the Supplemental Draft. They won their debut match on Raw against The World's Greatest Tag Team on June 18. Throughout July and August, they wrestled against The World's Greatest Tag Team and Lance Cade and Trevor Murdoch on Raw, and on September 3, they won a number one contender's match for Cade and Murdoch's World Tag Team Championship. At a house show in South Africa on September 5, London and Kendrick defeated Cade and Murdoch to win the World Tag Team Championship, only to lose it back in a rematch three days later. At the end of 2007, he was inactive due to a foot injury. London returned on the February 4, 2008, episode of Raw, when he and Kendrick lost to the team of Carlito and Santino Marella. On the March 17 episode of Raw, London and Kendrick faced Umaga in a handicap match. During the match, Kendrick walked out and left London to get pinned; no dissension came of the incident, and London and Kendrick continued to team together. They unsuccessfully challenged Hardcore Holly and Cody Rhodes for the World Tag Team Championship on May 26.

The team came to an end when Kendrick was drafted back to the SmackDown brand as part of the 2008 WWE Supplemental Draft in June. The following month, London was briefly involved in a storyline between Shawn Michaels, and Chris Jericho and Lance Cade, when Jericho and Cade used London as an example of what happened to those who idolized Michaels. London lost singles matches to both Jericho and Cade on Raw, before disappearing from television. London was released from his WWE contract on November 7, 2008.

=== Independent circuit (2009–2018) ===
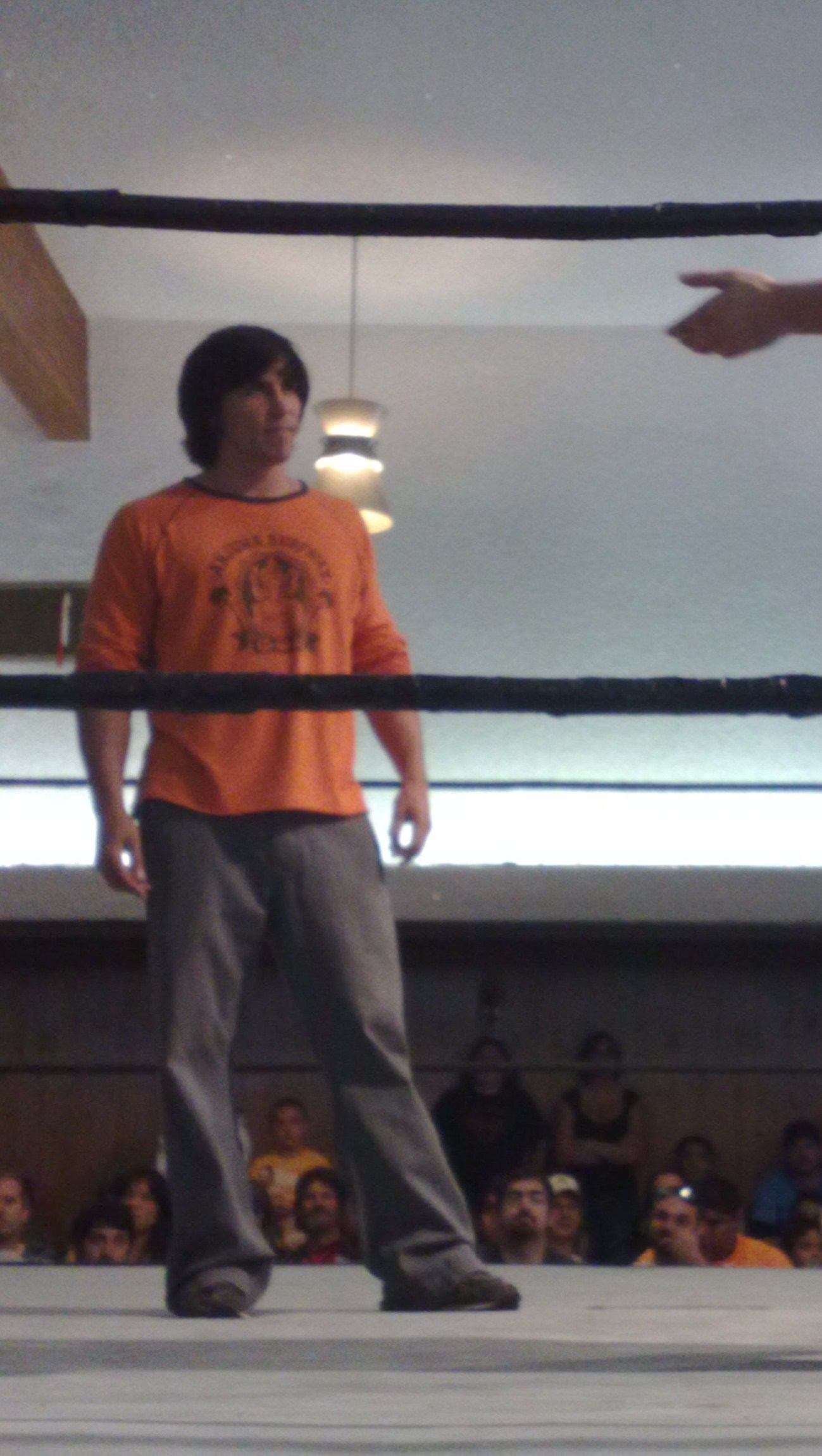
London on the independent circuit in 2009

London made his debut in Big Time Wrestling on February 28, 2009, defeating the BTW Champion Jason Styles by disqualification. At the event, he also debuted a new gimmick, described as "a nerdy blend of 1970s band Devo and a nerdy Air Force cadet with flight jacket and goofy, oversized sunglasses". On November 13, 2009, London defeated Jason Blade to win the Northeast Wrestling Championship. On July 10, 2010, London defeated Joey Silvia in a two out of three falls match to become the new Pro Wrestling Xperience Heavyweight Champion.

On March 26, 2010, London made his debut for Dragon Gate USA in a tag team match, where he and Jimmy Jacobs were defeated by Brian Kendrick and Jon Moxley. After the match, Kendrick turned on Moxley and re-formed his team with London, which led to a Loser Leaves Company tag team match between London and Kendrick and Jacobs and Jack Evans at the following day's tapings of the Mercury Rising pay-per-view. In the end Jacobs forced Kendrick to tap out and as a result he was forced to leave Dragon Gate USA for good. After the match London was assaulted by Teddy Hart.

In December 2010, London began working for Lucha Libre USA as the masked Sydistiko, taking over the role previously held by T. J. Perkins. He teamed up with Rellik to defeat Dinastia (El Oriental and Tinieblas Jr.) on December 12, 2010. The pair participated in three way match to decide the new LLUSA Tag Team Championship but this time El Oriental and Tinieblas Jr. would get the better of the pair. As Sydistiko, he would go on to lose all his matches including LLUSA Championship number one contendership lucha roulette elimination.

On July 30, 2011, London competed at Vanguard Championship Wrestling (VCW)'s Liberty Lottery 2011 event. He faced John Kermon, the VCW Liberty Champion, and defeated him to become the Liberty Champion. On February 16, 2013, London defeated Brian Kendrick at Family Wrestling Entertainment's No Limit, winning a title match against the Tri-Borough Champion Damian Darling. The same night, London defeated Darling, winning the title. On June 21, 2013, London defeated Akio to retain the title. The next day, London and Kendrick were defeated by The Young Bucks at House of Hardcore 2.

London spent the majority of 2014 wrestling abroad, including in Australia, Europe, and South America. In Scotland's Insane Championship Wrestling (ICW), London and Brian Kendrick won the ICW Tag Team Championship in October 2014. After a 28 day reign, they lost the championship to Polo Promotions (Mark Coffey and Jackie Polo) on November 2. Following this title loss, London would then unsuccessfully challenge Kenny Williams for the ICW Zero-G Championship.

On November 19, 2016, London wrestled for Target Wrestling, where he answered Shady Nattrass' High Octane Division Championship open challenge. London defeated Nattrass in the match and subsequently won the title. On April 20, 2017, London vacated the title due to a knee injury sustained while wrestling in San Diego. On July 29, 2017, it was announced that he would return to Target on August 18 to face Turbo Josh Terry for the High Octane Division Championship he vacated in April. On December 2, 2018, London lost to Cheech in a four way match for Alpha-1 Wrestling in Hamilton, Ontario. Afterwards, London took a hiatus from wrestling.

=== Pro Wrestling Guerrilla (2009–2010; 2013) ===
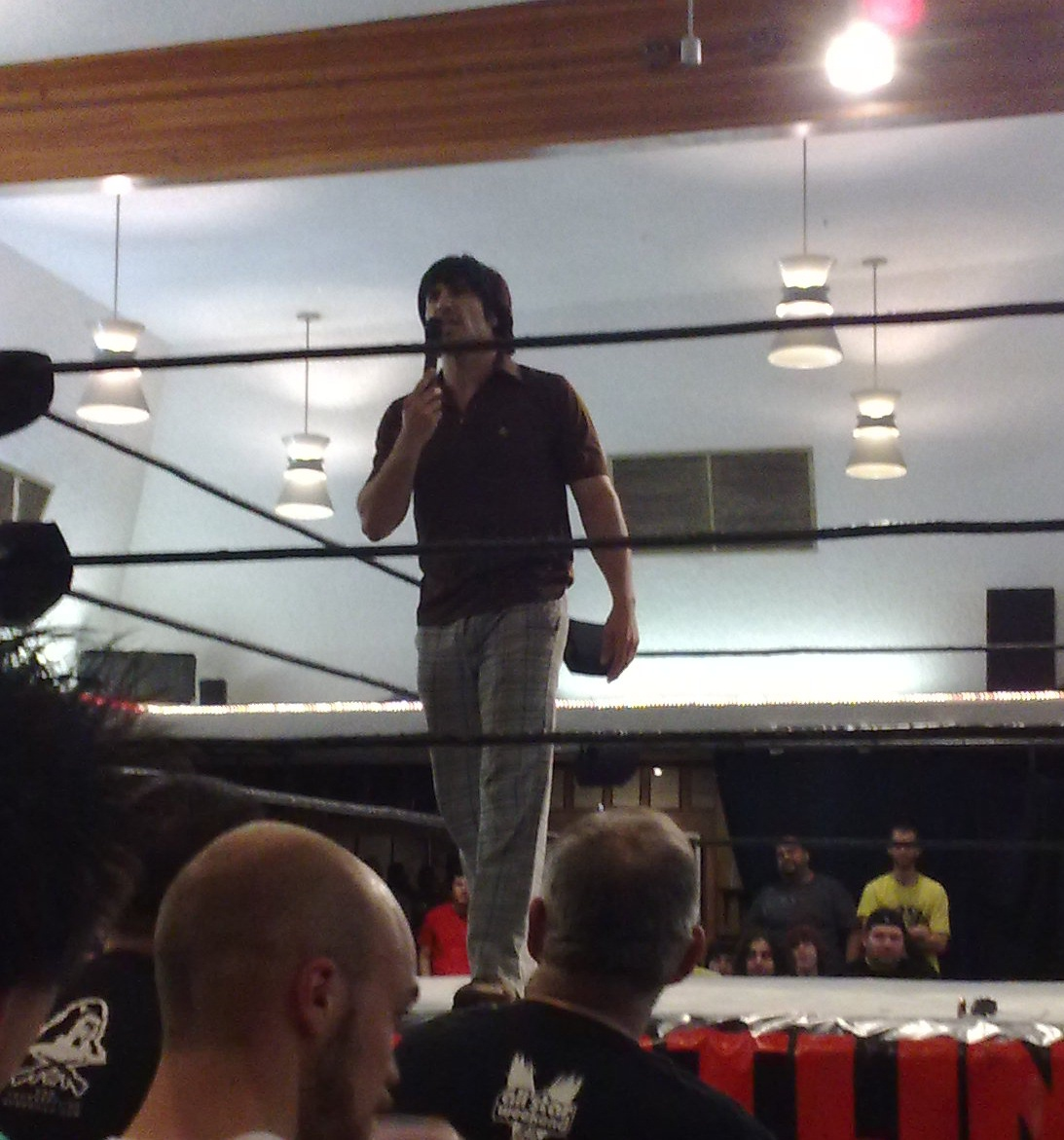
London at PWG's Ninety-Nine show in 2009

London made his return to the independent circuit by making his Pro Wrestling Guerrilla (PWG) debut on February 21, 2009, at Express Written Consent. He wrestled in a six man tag team main event where he and The Young Bucks (Nick and Matt Jackson) defeated The Dynasty (Joey Ryan, Scott Lost and Karl Anderson). He later formed an alliance with Bryan Danielson and Roderick Strong, known as the "Hybrid Dolphins". On January 30, 2010, London re-formed his partnership with Brian Kendrick in PWG and together the two of them defeated the PWG World Tag Team Champions Generation Me in a non-title match.

On April 10, 2010, London defeated PWG mainstay El Generico in a singles match. On May 9, the two men teamed up to form a duo introduced as ¡Peligro Abejas! (literally translated as The Danger Bees) in the fourth annual DDT4 eight-team tag tournament. After defeating "The Professional" Scott Lost and Chuck Taylor in the first round and Jay and Mark Briscoe in the semifinals, London and Generico defeated the Young Bucks in the finals of the tournament to win both DDT4 and the PWG World Tag Team Championship. Later in the year on December 11, 2010, ¡Peligro Abejas! successfully defended the PWG World Tag Team Championship against the ROH World Tag Team Champions The Kings of Wrestling (Chris Hero and Claudio Castagnoli). On April 9, 2011, London was forced to miss a PWG event, during which El Generico and London's replacement, Ricochet, lost the PWG World Tag Team Championship back to The Young Bucks.

After a two-year absence from PWG, London returned to the promotion on March 22, 2013, defeating Kevin Steen during the first night of the All Star Weekend 9. During the second night, he defeated Trent? in another singles match. At PWG's tenth anniversary show TEN he teamed with long-time partner Brian Kendrick in a loss to Chuck Taylor and Johnny Gargano.

=== Return to Ring of Honor (2013–2014) ===
On May 4, 2013, London made his first appearance for ROH in a decade, facing Davey Richards in a losing effort at Border Wars 2013. London suffered a stinger and concussion during the match and was as a result forced to pull out of the following day's tapings of Ring of Honor Wrestling. London returned to ROH on August 3, losing to Michael Elgin in the first round of a tournament for the ROH World Championship. London returned once again at Glory By Honor XII to defeat Roderick Strong. London would make four additional appearances for ROH in 2014; London competed on the Supershow of Honor events in the United Kingdom.

=== Lucha Underground (2016–2019) ===
On November 23, 2016, London debuted in Lucha Underground, appearing on the program's third season. He is the leader of the Trios Team known as "The Rabbit Tribe", together with Mala Suerte and Saltador. Their gimmick is a psychedelic drug take on the 1865 novel Alice's Adventures in Wonderland by Lewis Carroll. During the third season, the Rabbit Tribe considered Mascarita Sagrada as their God "The White Rabbit". On Episode 20 of Season 3, the Rabbit Tribe defeated Worldwide Underground to win three of the Aztec Medallions.

=== Impact Wrestling (2019) ===
In 2019, London returned to TNA, now known as Impact Wrestling. It was reported in September that he worked backstage as a producer on Impact television tapings in February.

=== Return to wrestling (2021–present) ===
London made his return to wrestling on April 24, 2021 when he defeated Val Venis at AAA/American Icon Jacksonmania 2 in Poway, California.

On August 19, 2023, London appeared at Imperial Pro Wrestling in Bristol, Tennessee. He wrestled up and comer Axton Ray in a losing effort.

On December 14, 2023, London appeared at Timebomb Pro in Fargo, North Dakota, wrestling for the Timebomb Pro Sanctuary title in a losing effort to Connor Hopkins. London made his entrance singing the theme to James Bond movie Thunderball.

== Filmography ==
Film
Year	Title	Role	Notes
2020	Tiger Man	Elvis Presley	Also stunts performer
2020	Top of the Class	Detective Ramirez	
2020	The Year of Laughing Dangerously	Mike Marshall	
2021	Fusion	Gordon	

Television
Year	Title	Role	Notes
2011-2012	Lucha Libre USA: Masked Warriors	Sydistiko	9 episodes
2016	Where the Bears Are	Wrestling Partner	2 episodes
2016-2018	Lucha Underground	Himself	25 episodes

Video games
Year	Title	Role	Notes
2005	WWE Day of Reckoning 2	Himself	
2005	WWE SmackDown! vs. Raw 2006	Himself	
2008	WWE SmackDown vs. RAW 2009	Himself	

== Other media ==
London appeared in ASAP Ferg's "Jet Lag" music video released on December 10, 2019.

== Personal life ==
London is half-Mexican on his mother's side. He is also bilingual, speaking both English and Spanish.

== Championships and accomplishments ==
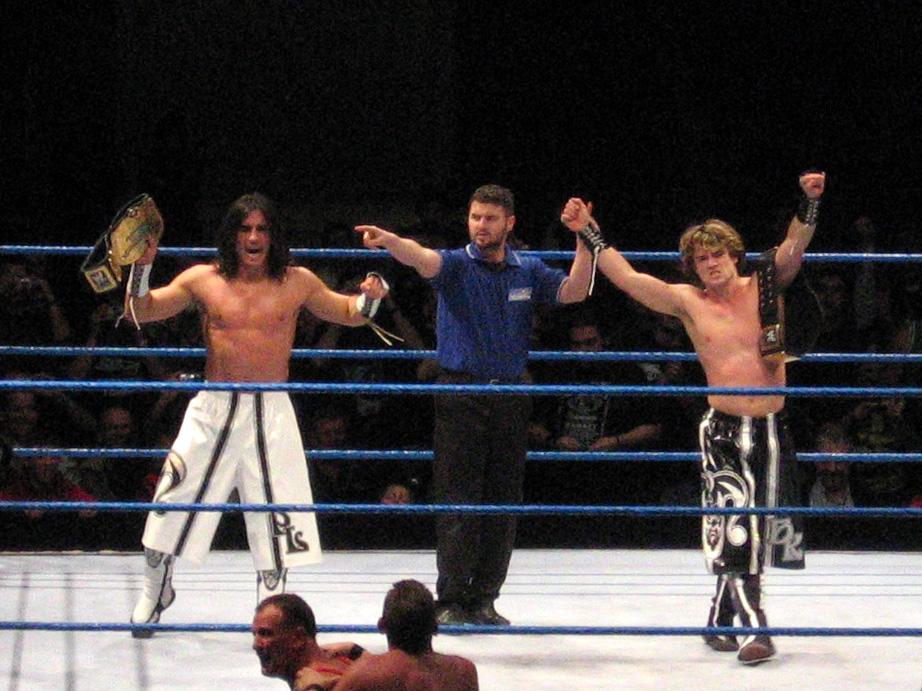
London (left) as one half of the WWE Tag Team Champions with Brian Kendrick (right) with their reign of 331 days being the second longest in history since the title's inception in 2002

- All Action Wrestling Perth
  - AAW Championship (1 time)
  - ACW Tag Team Championship (2 times) - with Jack Jameson (1), Darin Childs (1)
- Anarchy Championship Wrestling
  - ACW Tag Team Championship (1 time) - with Darin Childs
- Arizona Wrestling Federation
  - AWF Heavyweight Championship (1 time)
- Attack! Pro Wrestling
  - Attack! 24:7 Championship (1 time)
- East Coast Wrestling Association
  - ECWA Super 8 Tournament (2003)
- Extreme Texas Wrestling
  - ETW Television Championship (1 time)
- Family Wrestling Entertainment
  - FWE Tri-Borough Championship (1 time, final)
- Funking Conservatory
  - FC United States Championship (1 time)
  - FC Television Championship (1 time)
  - FC Hardcore Championship (1 time)
  - FC Tag Team Championship (1 time) – with Adam Windsor
- Indie Wrestling Hall of Fame
  - Class of 2023
- Insane Championship Wrestling
  - ICW Tag Team Championship (1 time) – with Brian Kendrick
- Insane Wrestling League
  - IWL World Heavyweight Championship (2 times)
- Northeast Wrestling
  - NEW Championship (1 time)
- NWA Wrestling Revolution
  - NWA Grand Warrior Championship (1 time)
- NWA Southwest
  - NWA Texas Television Championship (1 time)
- Primos Pro Wrestling
  - Primos 303 Championship (1 time)
- Professional Championship Wrestling
  - PCW Television Championship (1 time)
- Pro Wrestling Allstars
  - PWA European Allstar Championship (1 time)
- Pro Wrestling Bushido
  - PWB Television Championship (1 time)
- Pro Wrestling Guerrilla
  - PWG World Tag Team Championship (1 time) – with El Generico
  - Dynamite Duumvirate Tag Team Title Tournament (2010) – with El Generico
- Pro Wrestling Illustrated
  - Tag Team of the Year (2007) with Brian Kendrick
  - Ranked No. 36 of the top 500 singles wrestlers of the PWI 500 in 2005
- Pro Wrestling Xperience
  - PWX Heavyweight Championship (1 time, current)
- Ring of Honor
  - Number 1 Contender's Trophy Tournament (2002)
- Target Wrestling
  - High Octane Division Championship (1 time)
- Vanguard Championship Wrestling
  - VCW United States Liberty Championship (1 time)
- Wrecking Ball Wrestling
  - Wrecking Ball Wrestling- 2013 Tag Team of the year (1 time) – with Paige Turner
  - 2013 Match of the year with Paige Turner vs James Johnson and Angel Blue
  - 2013 Superstar of the year
- Wrestling Go!
  - Wrestling Go! 24/7 Watermelon Championship (2 time)
- World Wrestling Entertainment
  - World Tag Team Championship (1 time) – with Brian Kendrick
  - WWE Tag Team Championship (2 times) – with Billy Kidman (1) and Brian Kendrick (1)
  - WWE Cruiserweight Championship (1 time)
- Wrestling Observer Newsletter
  - Most Underrated (2004)
- Xtreme Italian Wrestling
  - XIW Italian Championship (1 time)
