= Christian York =

American professional wrestler (born 1977)

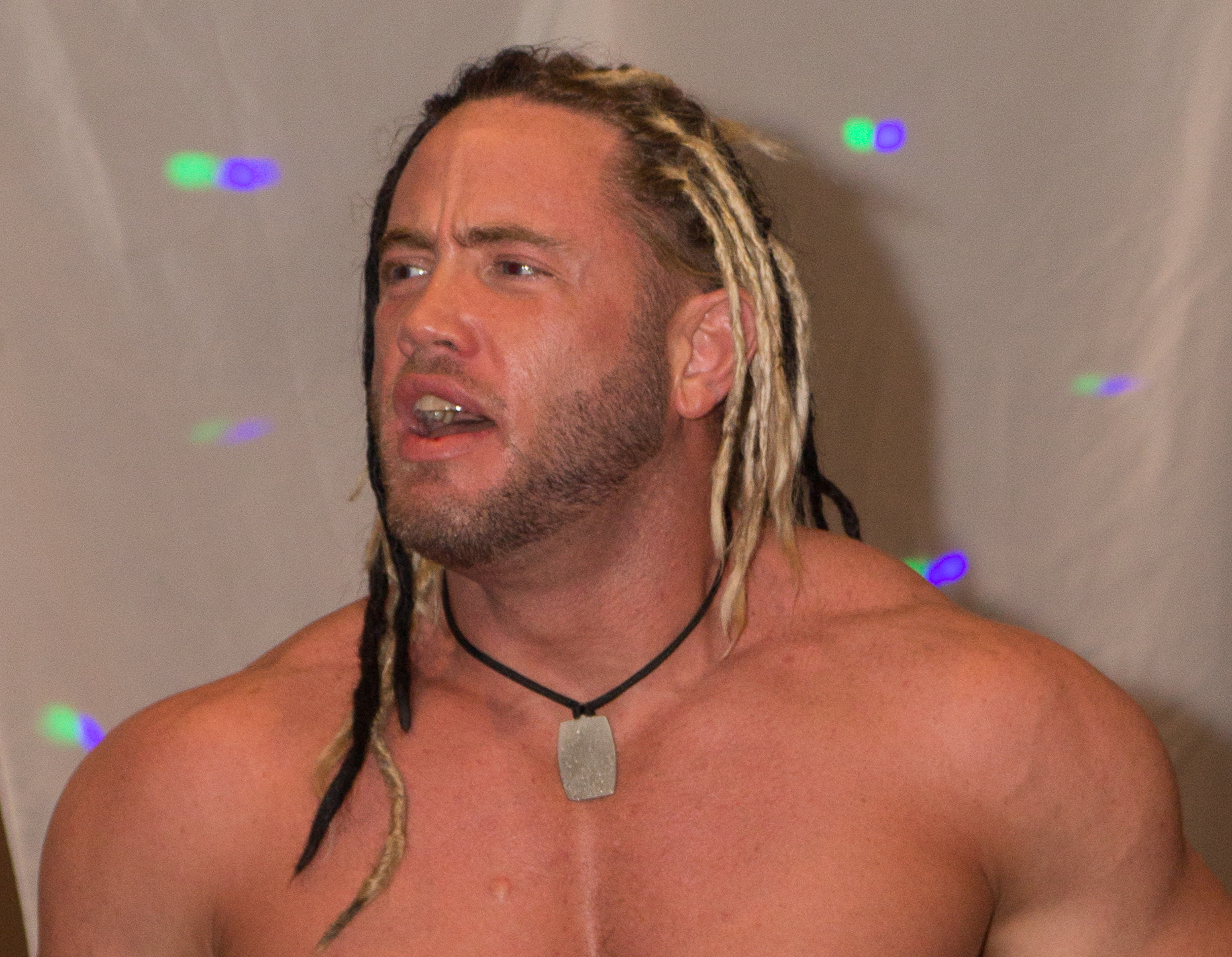
- York in 2013

Personal information
- Born: Jason Spence; April 13, 1977 (age 49) Fairfax, Virginia, U.S.

Professional wrestling career
- Ring name: Christian York
- Billed height: 5 ft 11 in (1.80 m)
- Billed weight: 220 lb (100 kg)
- Billed from: Fairfax, Virginia
- Trained by: Cueball Carmichael; Julio Dinero; OMEGA Championship Wrestling
- Debut: December 7, 1996

Jason Spence (born April 13, 1977) is an American professional wrestler, better known by his ring name, Christian York. He is best known for his appearances with World Championship Wrestling, Extreme Championship Wrestling and Impact Wrestling. Championships held by York over the course of his career include the NWA World Tag Team Championship as one-half of The Bad Street Boys with Joey Matthews.

== Professional wrestling career ==
=== Early career (1996–1999) ===
Spence trained under Cueball Carmichael and Jimmy Cicero in the IPWA Training School and had his in ring debut at the age of 19 on December 7, 1996, in Middleport, Ohio in a 30-minute Hardcore Ironman match against Joey Matthews. Adopting the name "Christian York", Spence wrestled for the Organization of Modern Extreme Grappling Arts (OMEGA), Southern Championship Wrestling, Steel City Wrestling, and numerous other independent promotions across the country. In OMEGA, York formed a stable known as the "Badstreet Boys", with Joey Matthews, as well as Shannon Moore and Shane Helms. The group had a boy band gimmick to capitalize on the bubble gum boy bands of pop culture.

=== National promotions (1999–2001) ===
Eventually, all four members of the group signed three-year contracts with Ted Turner's World Championship Wrestling (WCW) after try-outs on WCW Monday Nitro in the early summer of 1999. They stayed under contract until April 2000 when budget cuts were in order and management changed hands. York and Matthews went on to wrestle for numerous independent promotions, winning several tag team championships.

In April, they went to Vince McMahon's World Wrestling Federation (WWF) for try-outs in Baltimore on Raw and Richmond the following night for SmackDown!. The office was impressed with their ability but asked if they could send them to Paul Heyman's Extreme Championship Wrestling (ECW) for more seasoning. Following that date, they were signed to contracts by ECW and aligned themselves with Tommy Dreamer, Joey Styles, and Joel Gertner. York would wrestle on the last match on ECW Hardcore TV in a losing effort to Jerry Lynn.

After ECW declared bankruptcy in April 2001, York and Matthews were offered a contract from former employer WCW, and were written into the shows for the whole month. They then signed a three-year deal with the WWF. Upon signing the deal, they had to report to Memphis, Tennessee to work for WWF's farm league, Memphis Championship Wrestling, until being called up to the main roster. During their stay, they feuded with Eddie Fatu, Matt Anoa'i, Joey Abs, Lance Cade, Spanky, Bryan Danielson, and The Haas Brothers (Russ and Charlie). During their stay, Vince McMahon purchased WCW, upon which York and a number of development wrestlers were released.

=== Independent circuit (2001–present) ===
After only a few days being released, on July 20, York and Matthews returned to the independent circuit at International Wrestling Cartel losing to Evolution, the match also included the Backseat Boyz. On September 2, York and Matthews defeated the Holy Roller to become the Maryland Championship Wrestling's Tag Team Championship and would lose it in May 2002 to the Slackers. Throughout 2002 and 2003, York and Matthews appeared for Ring of Honor and Xtreme Pro Wrestling and even took on Youthanazia for the XPW World Tag Team Championship. In June 2002, they were signed to contracts by the newly formed Total Nonstop Action Wrestling promotion, after appearing on their inaugural pay-per-view against The Dupps. They were released later that year.

Away from tag team wrestling, York also had some notable exposure as a singles wrestler. Between the month August and September 2002, York took part in 3PW Heavyweight Title Tournament where he would make it to the final before losing to Gary Wolfe. In July 2003, York took part in the Shane Shamrock Memorial Cup six man match which also had the MCW Cruiserweight Championship and the MEWF Cruiserweight Championship on the line. York would line the match and would also unify the two titles to become the MEWF Maryland Unified Cruiserweight Championship.

In November 2002, York tore ligaments in his left ankle that kept him on the sidelines for three months. He would also have to vacate the MEWF Maryland Unified Cruiserweight Championship. York decided to get out of the wrestling business for a while to take care of life outside of wrestling after marrying his high-school sweetheart.

In February 2003, York made his debut in Delaware Championship Wrestling out of Delaware. York would team with Joey Matthews winning the DCW Tag-Team Championships. Delaware Championship Wrestling would change its name to Dynamite Championship Wrestling in 2004. The team would split up when Matthews went to WWE in 2005.

On July 22, 2006, however, York returned to the business to wrestle for Maryland Championship Wrestling.

On December 18, 2006, York faced "Bone Crusher" Fred Sampson in a tryout dark match for WWE. York also wrestled The Miz on SmackDown and Chuck Palumbo and Carlito on WWE Heat. He was then asked to report to Louisville, Kentucky's Ohio Valley Wrestling (OVW), to form a team with Johnny Jeter. York reported to OVW in September 2007, although still not under contract with WWE.

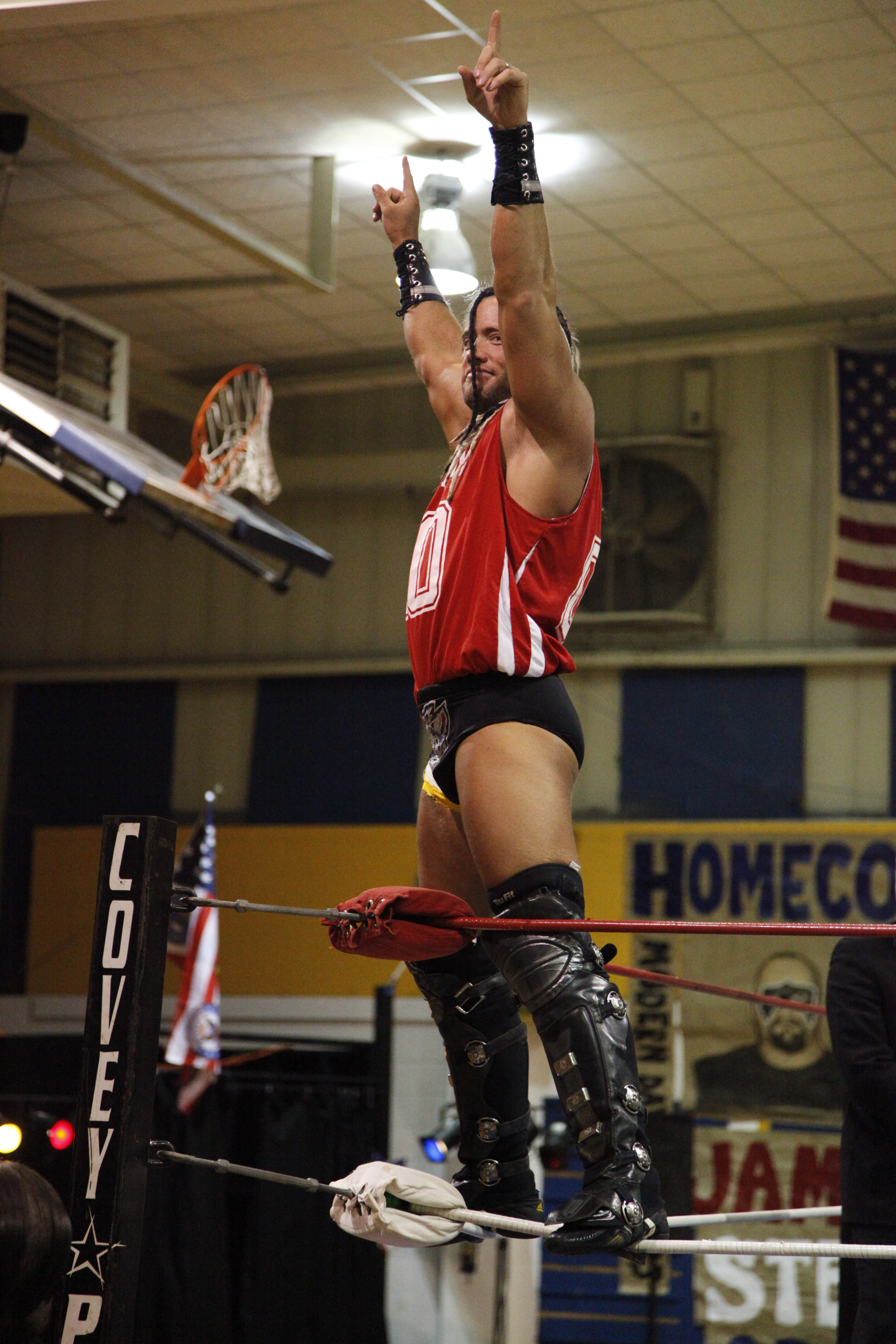
York in October 2012

In May 2007, York made a televised appearance with World Wrestling Entertainment, losing to The Miz on the May 19, 2007 episode of SmackDown.

On September 29, 2007, in Berwyn, Illinois, York reunited with Joey Mercury, in a losing effort against the AAW Tag Team Champions, The Motor City Machine Guns (Chris Sabin and Alex Shelley).

On the December 26, 2007 edition of Maryland Championship Wrestling's Season's Beatings event, York won a number one contendership tag team match with his former tag team partner and then MCW Heavyweight Champion, Joey Matthews after they defeated Tom Brandi and Adam Flash of the Creative Control stable. York later defeated Matthews to win his first MCW Heavyweight Championship.

On November 5, 2010, York defeated Robert Roma to become the new SCWA Mindshock Television champion. On February 22, 2013, York won the MCW Heavyweight Championship for the second time. He lost the title to Drolix on May 3, 2014.

On January 4, 2015, York appeared on the premiere episode of First State Championship Wrestling. He faced fellow ECW alumnus Justin Credible in an Extreme Rules match, which he won.

=== Total Nonstop Action Wrestling (2012–2013) ===
On November 1, 2012, York appeared on Total Nonstop Action Wrestling's (TNA) Impact Wrestling program, losing to Zema Ion in a TNA Gut Check match. On the following episode of Impact Wrestling, the Gut Check judges voted unanimously to sign York to a contract.

York returned on the November 22 episode of Impact Wrestling, losing to TNA World Heavyweight Champion Jeff Hardy in a non-title match. After defeating Kid Kash and Kenny King in a tournament to determine the number one contender to the TNA X Division Championship, York unsuccessfully challenged champion Rob Van Dam in a title match at Genesis on January 13, 2013. The day before Genesis, York took part in X-Travaganza, where he won a seven-man Xscape match which aired on April 5, 2013. That same day, York also took part in Joker's Wild which aired on May 3, 2013, competing in a tournament for a $100,000 cash prize; he teamed up with James Storm to defeat Crimson and Gunner in a tag team match to advanced to the main event Gauntlet Battle Royal, but was eliminated by Rob Terry. York returned on March 10 at Lockdown, unsuccessfully challenging Kenny King for the X Division Championship in a three-way match, which also included Zema Ion. York's last appearance for the company was on the May 16 episode of Impact Wrestling, losing to Jay Bradley in the first qualifying round for the Bound for Glory Series Tournament. On July 3, York was released from his TNA contract.

== Championships and accomplishments ==
- American Pro Wrestling Alliance
  - APWA World Tag Team Championship (2 times) – with Bobby Shields, Chase Stevens, Jock Samson and The Stro^{[a]} (1) and Viper (1)
  - 3rd Annual Holiday Grand Prix (2011)
- Atlantic Terror Championship Wrestling
  - ATCW Tag Team Championship (1 time) – with Joey Matthews
- Dynamite Championship Wrestling
  - DCW Tag Team Championship (1 time) – with Joey Matthews
- East Coast Wrestling Association
  - ECWA Tag Team Championship (1 time) – with Mark Schrader
- Far North Wrestling
  - FNW Heavyweight Championship (1 time)
- First State Championship Wrestling
  - 1CW Heavyweight Championship (1 time)
- Independent Professional Wrestling Alliance
  - IPWA Light Heavyweight Championship (2 times)
- KYDA Pro Wrestling
  - KYDA Pro Heavyweight Championship (2 times)
- Maryland Championship Wrestling
  - MCW Heavyweight Championship (2 times)
  - MCW Cruiserweight Championship (2 times)
  - MCW Tag Team Championship (3 times) – with Joey Matthews (2) and Ruckus (1)
  - Shane Shamrock Memorial Cup (1999, 2003, 2010)
- Mid-Eastern Wrestling Federation
  - MEWF Cruiserweight Championship (1 time)
  - MEWF Tag Team Championship (1 time) – with Joey Matthews
- National Wrestling Alliance
  - NWA World Tag Team Championship (1 time) – with Joey Matthews
- Organization of Modern Extreme Grappling Arts
  - OMEGA Light Heavyweight Championship (1 time)
- Operation Save Foundation
  - OSF Adrenaline Championship (1 time)
- Pro Wrestling Illustrated
  - PWI ranked him # 128 of the Top 500 singles wrestlers in the PWI 500 in 2001.
- Real Championship Wrestling
  - RCW Heavyweight Championship (1 time)
  - CZW South Championship (1 time)
- Southern Championship Wrestling
  - SCW Junior Heavyweight Championship (2 times)
- Squared Circle Wrestling Alliance
  - SCWA Mindshock Television Championship (1 time)
- Steel City Wrestling
  - SCW Light Heavyweight Championship (1 time)
  - SCW Tag Team Championship (1 time) – with Joey Matthews
- Total Nonstop Action Wrestling
  - TNA Gut Check winner
  - TNA X Division Championship #1 Contender Tournament (2013)
- Universal Wrestling Council
  - UWC Heavyweight Championship (1 time)
- Vanguard Championship Wrestling
  - VCW Tag Team Championship (2 time) – with Joey Matthews (1) and John Kermon (1)
- Virginia Championship Wrestling
  - VCW Tag Team Championship (1 time) – with Joey Matthews

^{a} York defended the championship with either Stevens, The Stro, Shields, or Samson under the Freebird Rule.
