= OMEGA Light Heavyweight Championship =

Professional wrestling championship

Details
- Promotion: Organization of Modern Extreme Grappling Arts
- Date established: December 5, 1997
- Date retired: October 1999
Statistics
- First champion: Kid Dynamo
- Final champion: Joey Matthews
- Most reigns: Joey Matthews and Kid Dynamo (2 reigns)
- Longest reign: Joey Matthews (between 245 and 275 days)
- Shortest reign: Christian York (55 days)
- Oldest champion: Christian York (21 years, 267 days)
- Youngest champion: Kid Dynamo (18 years, 131 days)
- Heaviest champion: Christian York (100 Kg)
- Lightest champion: Joey Matthews (87 Kg)

The OMEGA Light Heavyweight Championship was the top light heavyweight title in the Organization of Modern Extreme Grappling Arts independent professional wrestling promotion. The title lasted from 1997 to 1999. This is the only OMEGA title that neither of the Hardy brothers ever won.

== Title history ==
No.	Order in reign history
Reign	The reign number for the specific set of wrestlers listed
Event	The event in which the title was won
—	Used for vacated reigns so as not to count it as an official reign
N/A	The information is not available or is unknown

No.	Wrestler	Reign	Date	Days held	Location	Event	Notes	Ref...
1	Kid Dynamo	1	December 5, 1997	147	Southern Pines, NC	OMEGA	Records unclear as to whom he defeated.	
2	Joey Matthews	1	May 1, 1998	91	Sanford, NC	OMEGA	This was Champion vs. Champion Winner Takes All match. Here Joey Matthews's NCW Light Heavyweight Championship also on the line.	
3	Kid Dynamo	2	July 31, 1998	127	Southern Pines, NC	OMEGA	This was a Three Way Ladder match also involving Ice.	
4	Christian York	1	December 5, 1998	55	Durham, NC	OMEGA	This was a Fatal four-way match also involves Ice and Joey Matthews.	
5	Joey Matthews	2	January 29, 1999	245 – 275	Wendell, NC	OMEGA		
—	Retired	—	October 1999	—	N/A	N/A	Title retired when the promotion closed.	

== Combined reigns ==
Rank	Wrestler	No. of reigns	Combined days
1	Joey Matthews	2	336-366
2	Kid Dynamo	2	274
3	Christian York	1	55
