= IPWA Light Heavyweight Championship =

Professional wrestling championship

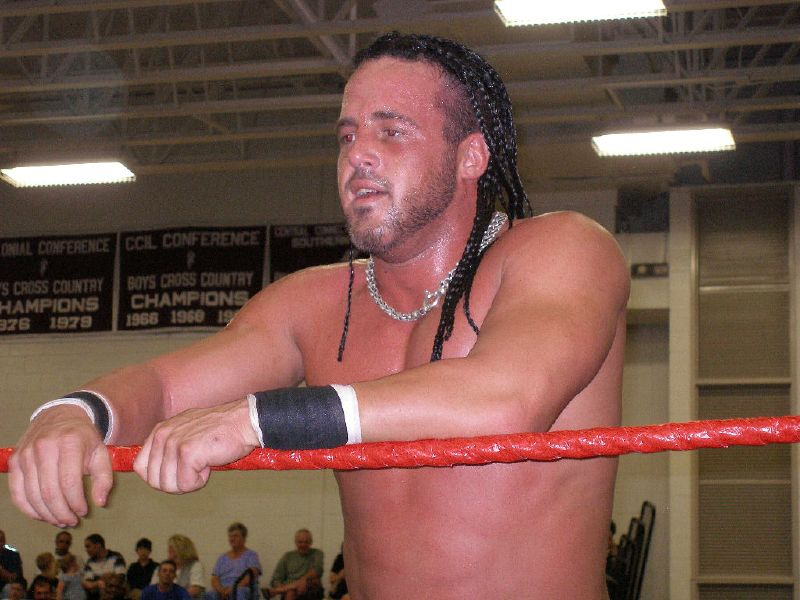
- Joey Matthews is a former IPWA Light Heavyweight Champion.

Details
- Promotion: Independent Professional Wrestling Alliance
- Date established: June 7, 1996
- Date retired: 2001
Statistics
- First champion(s): Mark Shrader
- Final champion(s): Jacey North (won March 25, 2000)
- Most reigns: Julio Sanchez (4)
- Longest reign: Julio Sanchez (11 days)
- Shortest reign: Julio Sanchez (273 days)

The IPWA Light Heavyweight Championship was a professional wrestling light heavyweight championship in Independent Professional Wrestling Alliance (IPWA). The inaugural champion was Mark "The Shark" Shrader, who defeated Quinn Nash (substituting for Earl the Pearl) in a tournament final on June 7, 1996 to become the first IPWA Light Heavyweight Champion.

There were 7 officially recognized champions with Julio Sanchez winning the title a record 4-times. He was also its longest reigning champion with his second title reign lasting 273 days. Some of the top "indy cruiserweights" on the East Coast wrestled for the title during its near 6-year history with former champions including Steve Corino, Christian York, and Joey Matthews.

== Title history ==
#	Order in reign history
Reign	The reign number for the specific set of wrestlers listed
Event	The event in which the title was won
—	Used for vacated reigns so as not to count it as an official reign
N/A	The information is not available or is unknown
+	Indicates the current reign is changing daily

=== Names ===
Name	Years
IPWA Light Heavyweight Championship	1996 — 2001

=== Reigns ===
#	Wrestlers	Reign	Date	Days held	Location	Event	Notes	Ref.
1	Mark Shrader	1	June 7, 1996	98	Alexandria, Virginia	Live event	Shrader defeated Quinn Nash (substituting for Earl the Pearl in a tournament final to become the first IPWA Light Heavyweight Champion.	
—	Vacated	—	September 13, 1996	—	N/A	N/A	The championship is vacated after Mark Shrader wins the MEWF Heavyweight Championship.	
2	Earl the Pearl	1	September 21, 1996	35	Alexandria	Live event	Defeated Johnny Graham and Sheik Ali Amin in a three-way match to win the vacant title.	
3	Mark Shrader	2	May 1996	N/A	Alexandria	Live event		
4	Julio Sanchez	1	March 22, 1997	38	Lenoir, North Carolina	Live event		
—	Vacated	—	April 29, 1997	—	N/A	N/A		
5	Steve Corino	1	May 2, 1997	223	Pikeville, North Carolina	Live event	Corino defeated Christian York in a tournament final to win both the IPWA and NWA 2000 Light Heavyweight Championships.	
6	Julio Sanchez	2	December 7, 1997	273	Alexandria	Live event		
7	Christian York	1	June 13, 1998	70	Alexandria	Live event		
8	Julio Sanchez	3	August 22, 1998	11	Chincoteague, Virginia	Live event		
9	Christian York	2	September 2, 1998	210	Richmond, Virginia	Live event		
10	Joey Matthews	1	January 9, 1999	14	Chincoteague	Live event		
11	Julio Sanchez	4	January 23, 1999	N/A	Alexandria	Live event	Sanchez defeated Joey Matthews and Christian York in a three-way match.	
12	Joey Matthews	2	N/A	N/A	N/A	N/A		
13	Jacey North	1	March 25, 2000	N/A	Quantico, Virginia	Live event		
—	Deactivated	—	2001	—	N/A	N/A	The IPWA ceases promoting events and closes in the spring of 2001.	

== List of combined reigns ==
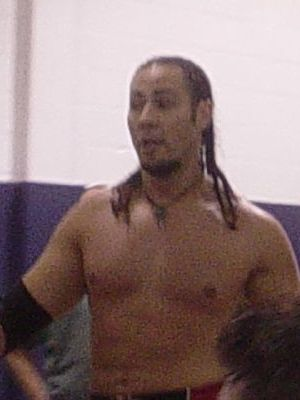
Julio Sanchez, who was the longest-reigning IPWA Light Heavyweight Champion

<1	Indicates that the reign lasted less than one day.

Rank (Note: Each reign is ranked highest to lowest; reigns with the same number mean that they are tied for that certain rank.)	Wrestler	# of reigns	Combined days
1	Julio Sanchez	4	344
2	Christian York	2	280
3	Steve Corino	1	223
4	Mark Shrader	2	98+
5	Earl the Pearl	1	35
