= Joey Mercury =

American professional wrestler (born 1979)

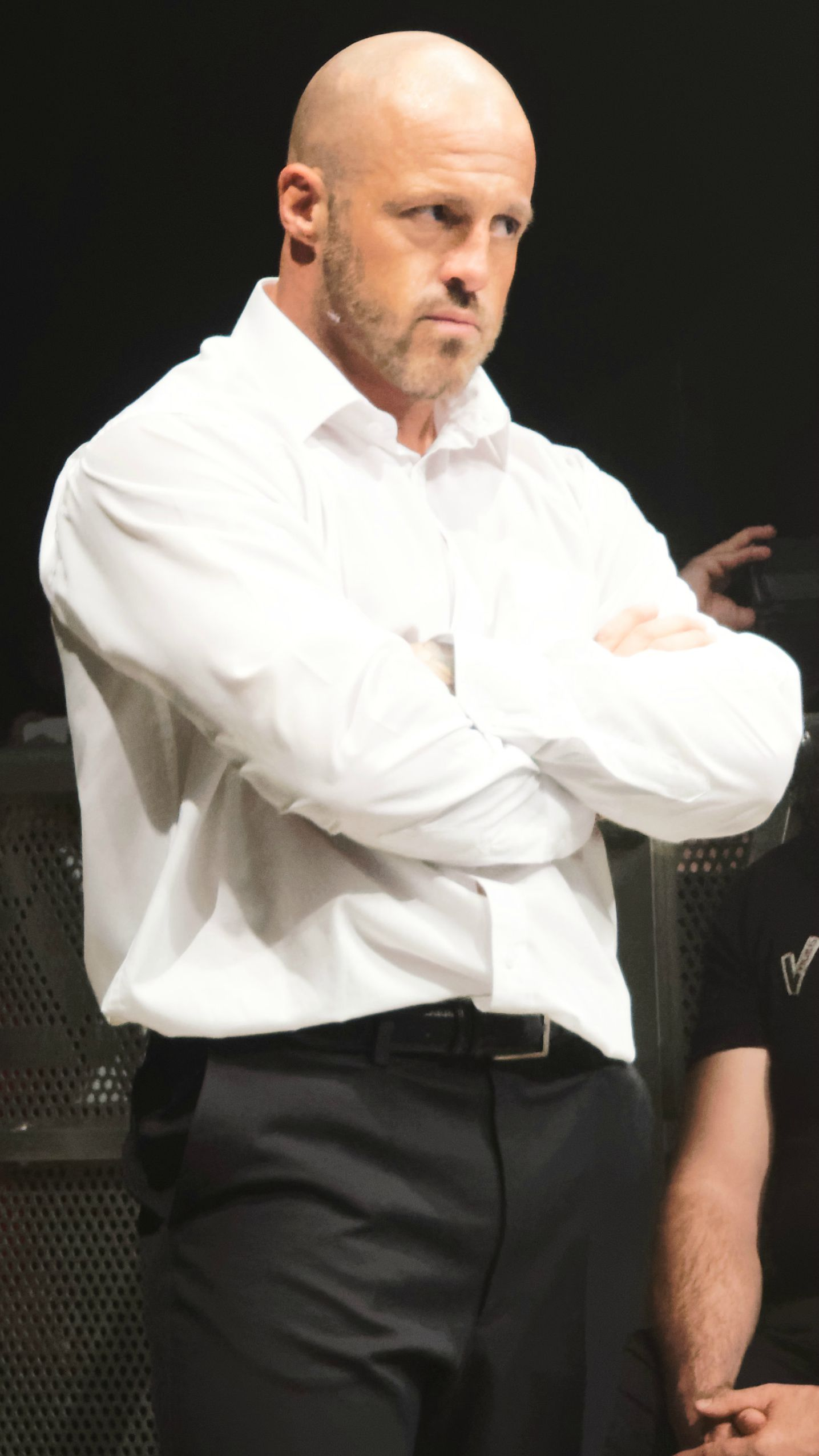
- Mercury in 2015

Personal information
- Born: Adam Birch; July 18, 1979 (age 47) Fairfax, Virginia, U.S.

Professional wrestling career
- Ring name(s): Joey Matthews; Joey Mercury; Joseph Mercury; Joey Wrestling
- Billed height: 5 ft 9 in (1.75 m)
- Billed weight: 218 lb (99 kg)
- Billed from: Los Angeles, California
- Trained by: Jimmy Cicero
- Debut: April 12, 1996
- Retired: 2018

Adam Birch (born July 18, 1979), better known by the ring name Joey Mercury, is an American professional wrestler, producer, trainer, and wrestling agent. He is best known for his tenures in WWE and Ring of Honor.

Birch was trained by fellow wrestler Jimmy Cicero and made his wrestling debut in October 1996, using the name Joey Matthews as he wrestled in ECW Extreme Championship Wrestling. The following year, he began competing for Mid-Eastern Wrestling Federation (MEWF), where he began competing in tag team competition and captured the MEWF Tag Team Championship, alongside Christian York. Throughout the late-1990s, Birch competed in various independent promotions, where he and York continued to work as a team. It was also during that time that he won various championships in singles and tag team competition.

While situated at OVW, he was placed in tag team competition, alongside Johnny Nitro, in which they won the OVW Southern Tag Team Championship on one occasion. It was also during this time that he and Nitro, alongside their manager Melina, were known as the stable MNM. The group were called up to the SmackDown! roster and on their debut in April 2005, Mercury and Nitro went on to win the WWE Tag Team Championship. After their third and final reign ended in May 2006, Nitro and Melina turned on Mercury, thus ending their faction. However, in November 2006, the team reunited for a brief period, before Mercury was let go from his contract in March 2007.

Following his stint with WWE, Birch continued his wrestling career, appearing at several independent promotions, including competing at Ring of Honor events. In March 2008, he returned to OVW, where he won the OVW Television Championship on one occasion. In October 2008, Birch announced his retirement from professional wrestling, following an injury, but later returned to wrestling in 2010, working for WWE as a producer and making a brief in-ring return as part of CM Punk's Straight Edge Society. He returned to TV once again in 2014 alongside Jamie Noble, (known as J&J Security) as an on screen security guard for the WWE World Heavyweight Champion Seth Rollins as part of The Authority faction.

== Professional wrestling career ==
=== Early career (1996–2001) ===
After being trained by fellow professional wrestler Jimmy Cicero, Birch made his debut in October 1996 under the name Joey Matthews. In 1997, approximately a year after his debut, Matthews began competing for the Mid-Eastern Wrestling Federation (MEWF) promotion, where he won the MEWF Tag Team Championship with Christian York. Matthews defeated York on May 8, 1998, to regain the Southern Championship Wrestling Junior Heavyweight Championship in Wendell, North Carolina. Matthews and York, soon teamed up again, however, and won the Steel City Wrestling Tag Team Championship on December 20, 1998. Less than a month later, Matthews defeated York to win the Independent Professional Wrestling Alliance Light Heavyweight Championship on January 9, 1999.

He was also a member of the North Carolina–based Organization of Modern Extreme Grappling Arts (OMEGA) run by Matt and Jeff Hardy, where he defeated York to win the OMEGA Light Heavyweight Championship on January 29, 1999. He was signed to a World Championship Wrestling contract in 1999; Birch did not make any appearances for the promotion during the seven months he was signed to a contract. A few months later, while competing in singles competition at Maryland Championship Wrestling (MCW), he once again defeated York to win the MCW Cruiserweight Championship on May 21. Matthews and York soon began teaming again, and, sometimes using the Bad Street Boys as a tag team name, they won numerous tag team championships, including the Atlantic Terror Championship Wrestling Tag Team Championship on January 15, 2000, and the MCW Tag Team Championship on May 17, 2000.

=== Early WWF/WWE appearances (2000, 2003) ===
In May 2000, Matthews and York fought in two matches losing to The Dupps.

On April 14, 2003, prior to World Wrestling Entertainment (WWE)'s flagship television program, Raw, Matthews and York defeated Phil Brown and Pat Cusick in a dark match. He continued wrestling dark matches and on supplementary programs Heat and Velocity, facing the likes of Lance Storm, Crowbar, Matt Hardy, Último Dragón and A-Train.

=== Extreme Championship Wrestling (2000–2001) ===
In late 2000, Matthews and York joined Extreme Championship Wrestling (ECW), and lost to Danny Doring and Roadkill at Anarchy Rulz. They then began a feud with Simon and Swinger, whom they lost to at November to Remember, but defeated at Massacre on 34th Street. They competed in ECW for approximately six months, until the promotion closed in January 2001 and were on the company's final pay-per-view Guilty as Charged, where they suffered a loss to Jerry Lynn and Cyrus.

=== Independent circuit (2001–2004) ===
After the closure of ECW, they returned to the independent circuit, where, on February 3, 2001, the Bad Street Boys defeated Rick Michaels and David Young to become the NWA World Tag Team Champions, a championship that they held for two weeks. They won the MCW Tag Team Championship for the second time on November 3 by defeating Earl the Pearl and Rich Myers, and later won the Virginia Championship Wrestling Tag Team Championship on December 1, 2001.

In 2002, Matthews and York competed in Ring of Honor (ROH), and teamed together on several occasions, before Matthews joined a faction called Special K, of which he was a member until 2004. He also worked for various independent organizations such as Xtreme Pro Wrestling, Maryland Championship Wrestling (MCW) and Phoenix Championship Wrestling. On January 29, 2003, Matthews defeated Romeo Valentino to win the MCW Rage Television Championship, but lost it four months later to Doug Delicious on May 15.

On July 19, 2003, at ROH's Death Before Dishonor, he teamed with Krazy K in a loss to Jeff Hardy in a handicap match. In August 2003, Matthews lost to Chris Sabin on an episode of TNA Xplosion.

After spending some time at the Ohio Valley Wrestling (OVW) training center in 2003, Matthews made several appearances in Pro-Pain Pro Wrestling (3PW), defeating A.J. Styles, before defeating Jerry Lynn and Sabu to become the number one contender to the 3PW Heavyweight Championship. On April 17, 2004, he defeated Raven to win the championship, a title he retained until August 21 of that year, when he lost it to Christopher Daniels in a four-way elimination match, also involving A.J. Styles and Chris Sabin.

He was also still competing in TNA's X Division, and in August, he took part in a 20-Man Gauntlet match, in which Petey Williams won the X Division title. Afterwards, Matthews competed for Puerto Rico's World Wrestling Council (WWC), losing to Eddie Colón in September, and exchanging victories with Alex Montalvo in November.

=== World Wrestling Entertainment (2004–2007) ===
He moved to Louisville, Kentucky to the Ohio Valley Wrestling (OVW) farm territory. He lost to Rhino and Maven on Sunday Night Heat in April and June 2004.

There he formed a faction with Johnny Nitro; along with manager Melina, they were known as "MNM". MNM wrestled in OVW for around a year, winning the OVW Southern Tag Team Championship once, before being called up to the main SmackDown! roster, where Matthews was renamed Joey Mercury.

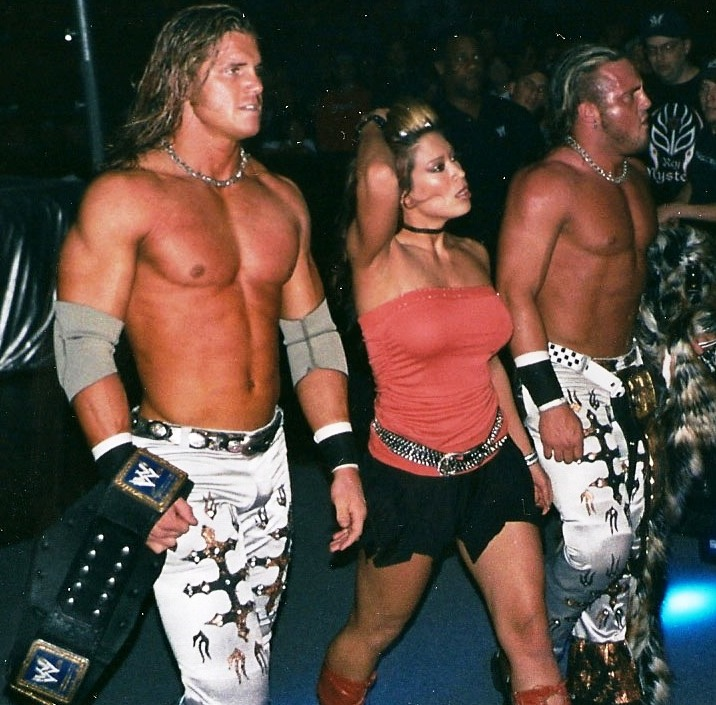
Nitro (left), Melina (center) and Mercury (right) as WWE Tag Team Champions in 2006

In their first match for the SmackDown! brand, in April 2005, they won the WWE Tag Team Championship from Rey Mysterio and Eddie Guerrero. They held the titles for three months, having successful titles defenses against the teams of Mysterio and Guerrero and Hardcore Holly and Charlie Haas at Judgment Day, before dropping them to the new Legion of Doom (LOD) at The Great American Bash in July 2005. They recaptured the titles on the October 28 episode of SmackDown! in a four-way match defeating the Mexicools, William Regal and Paul Burchill, and LOD, but lost them to Mysterio and Batista two days before the Armageddon pay-per-view in December. Due to help from Mark Henry, they defeated Mysterio and Batista in a rematch on the December 30 episode of SmackDown! to win the WWE Tag Team Championship for the third time. They began a rivalry with the team of Paul London and Brian Kendrick that lasted over three months, until the Judgment Day pay-per-view on May 21, 2006, where MNM lost the WWE Tag Team Championship to London and Kendrick. Nitro and Melina suddenly turned on Mercury, attacking him and breaking up the group. Later that night Nitro and Melina were fired from the SmackDown! brand in storyline, to facilitate their move to Raw, where they reappeared the following week. The legitimate reason for the team's sudden split was later revealed to be Mercury failing a WWE Wellness Policy drug test and being forced to serve a 30-day suspension.

Mercury stayed off WWE television for six months. Mercury made a surprise return on the November 27, 2006 episode of Raw, temporarily reforming MNM with Nitro and Melina to take up the also recently reunited Hardys (Matt and Jeff) "open challenge" for December to Dismember. The Hardys went on to win the match at December to Dismember, but the feud continued across all three brands (Raw, ECW, and SmackDown!), and in a fatal-four way ladder match for the WWE Tag Team Championship at December's Armageddon event, also involving London and Kendrick, and Dave Taylor and William Regal. During the ladder match, Mercury suffered a legitimate injury when he was struck in the face with a ladder, breaking his nose and orbital bone. He immediately left the match and was rushed to an emergency room where he received more than thirty stitches. As a result, Nitro continued the match on his own.

After missing a few weeks, Mercury returned wearing a protective face mask and his injury was worked into the angle, with both he and Nitro attempting to injure the Hardys in various ways for revenge. MNM lost to The Hardys at the Royal Rumble, and again in a six-man tag team match in which they teamed with Montel Vontavious Porter (Chris Benoit teamed with The Hardys) at the No Way Out pay-per-view in February which concluded the feud. He also wrestled in singles competition on SmackDown! until he was released from his WWE contract on March 26, 2007.

=== Independent circuit (2007–2008) ===
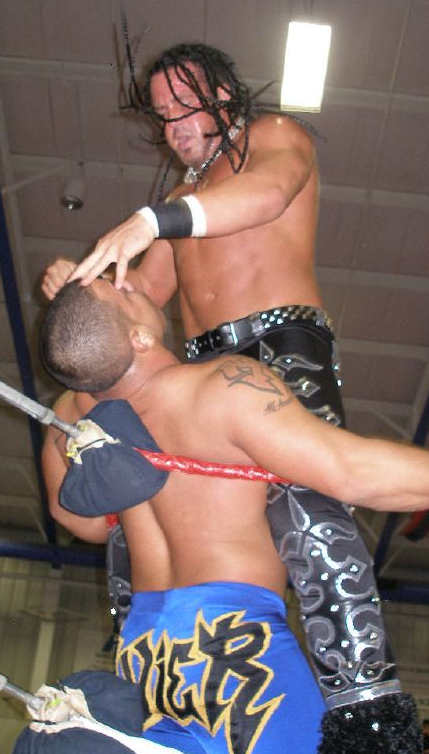
Birch wrestling Xavier on the independent circuit in 2007

Birch's first appearance after his WWE release was on April 21 for Northeast Wrestling as Joey Matthews, when he and Romeo Roselli defeated The NOW. He went on to make appearances for MCW, Independent Wrestling Association Mid-South, and the New York Wrestling Connection, competing against wrestlers including Alex Shelley, Tyler Black, and Brother Runt. Matthew's wrestled in All American Wrestling (AAW) in July 2007, where he lost to Eric Priest in a match for the AAW Heritage Championship. He made another appearance on September 29, reuniting with Christian York, in a losing effort against the AAW Tag Team Champions, The Motor City Machine Guns (Chris Sabin and Alex Shelley).

In September 2007, Matthews began working for OVW as a trainer for the intermediate class. He also competed in dark matches at the OVW television tapings. At TNA's Bound for Glory pay-per-view in October 2007, he competed in a dark match, where he teamed with Johnny Swinger in a losing effort to The Motor City Machineguns. For the remainder of 2007, Matthews worked for independent promotions, including Pro Wrestling Unplugged and the United Wrestling Federation.

On March 12, 2008, at an OVW television taping, he defeated Jamin Olivencia to win the OVW Television Championship. After successful defenses against Olivencia, he dropped the title to Tommy McNailer a month later on April 16. In October 2008, Birch announced his retirement from professional wrestling due to injury.

=== Ring of Honor (2008) ===
On January 25, 2008, Matthews returned to ROH as the newest member of Age of the Fall (AotF), where he partnered with Jimmy Jacobs in a losing effort against Roderick Strong and Rocky Romero of the No Remorse Corps. The following night, Matthews lost to Mark Briscoe. Matthews was mainly utilized in a tag team role as a member of the AotF, teaming with fellow faction members Tyler Black and Necro Butcher. He continued to wrestle for ROH until Battle For Supremacy in June 2008, when he and Jimmy Jacobs lost to Kevin Steen and El Generico, in what was his last ROH wrestling match.

=== Return to WWE (2010–2017) ===
In 2010, Birch came out of retirement and returned to WWE at the SmackDown tapings on April 20, where he lost to Shelton Benjamin in a dark match. On April 25 at Extreme Rules, he reappeared on television as a masked member of the CM Punk's Straight Edge Society stable and interfered in Punk's match with Rey Mysterio, helping him pick up the win. Birch continued to interfere in Punk's matches during the following months, before being unmasked by Big Show on the July 23 episode of SmackDown. This led to a handicap match at SummerSlam where Big Show defeated the entire Society. In early September it was reported that Mercury had undergone surgery on a torn pectoral muscle.

In order to rehabilitate his injury, he began training at Florida Championship Wrestling, WWE's developmental territory. He later began working there as a trainer. Following this, he moved into a producer role for the main roster.

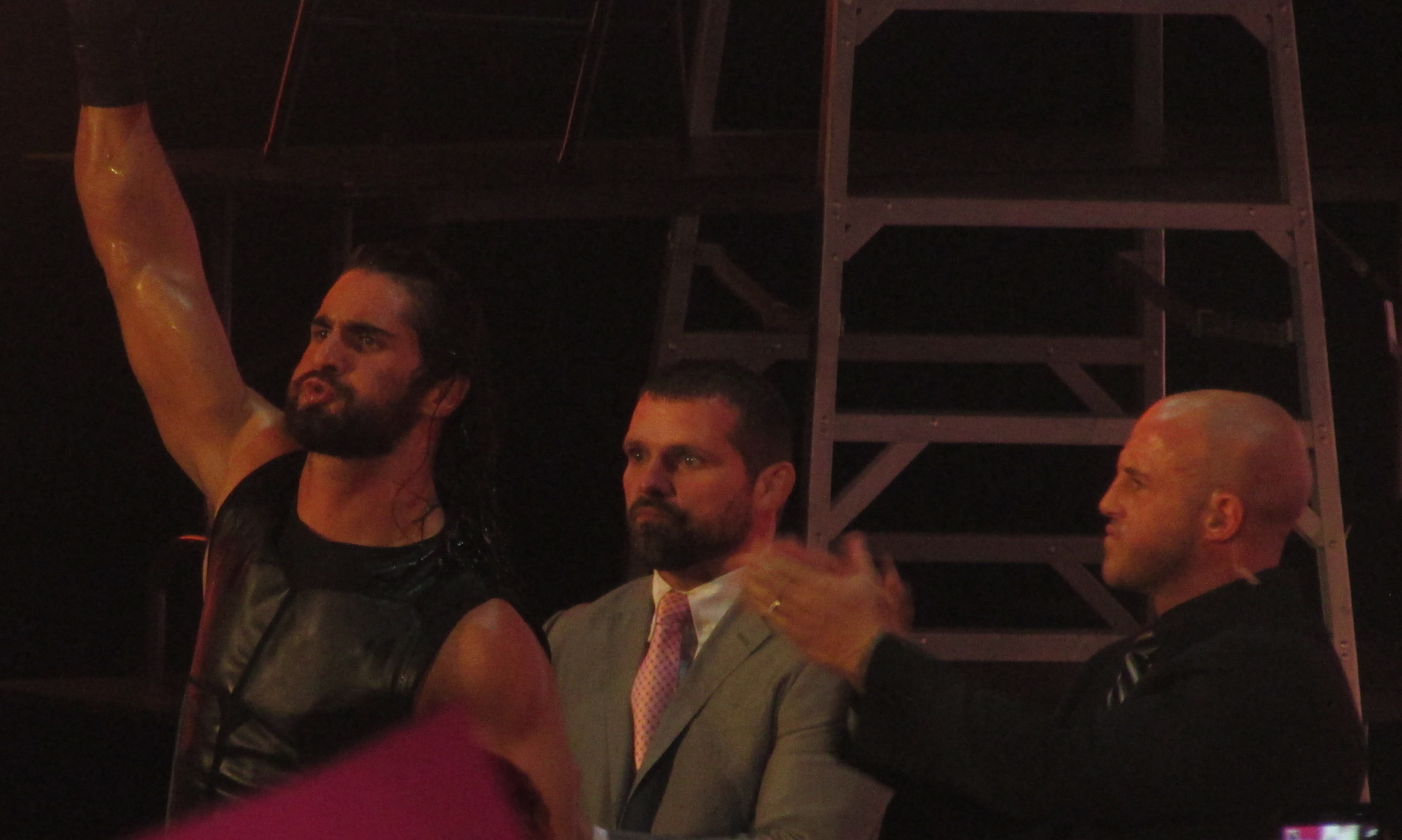
Mercury (right) with J&J Security partner Jamie Noble (center) and Seth Rollins (left) in December 2014

On the September 29, 2014 episode of Raw, Mercury and fellow producer Jamie Noble aligned themselves with The Authority. Dubbed "J&J Security", Mercury and Noble began acting as bodyguards to Authority member Seth Rollins. On the November 24 episode of Raw, J&J Security wrestled the first televised matches for each man in several years, partnering with Rollins in a three-on-two handicap match against John Cena and Dolph Ziggler, which they lost. On the March 16, 2015 episode of Raw, both Mercury and Noble seemingly left The Authority due to Rollins not listening them. Later that night, it was revealed to be a ruse, with all The Authority members coming out to help Rollins take out Randy Orton, but they were stopped by Sting, who made a surprise appearance and helped Orton fight off The Authority. On the June 22 episode of Raw, J&J Security reconciled with Rollins when the three of them and Kane attacked Brock Lesnar. On the July 6 episode of Raw, Mercury was viciously beaten by Lesnar, who after destroying his and fellow J&J Security member Jamie Noble's prized Cadillac car, which had been gifted to them by Seth Rollins the week before, picked him up and tossed him onto the then unbroken windshield of it. On July 7, it was reported that Mercury suffered mild contusions as a result of the attack and both members of J&J Security would be out of action indefinitely.

Mercury appeared on the March 14, 2016 episode of Raw breaking up the brawl between Triple H and Roman Reigns. In January 2017, it was reported that Birch had been released from WWE.

=== Return to independent circuit (2017–2018) ===
Birch, performing once again as Joey Matthews, announced his return as an active independent wrestler. Matthews won the MCW Shane Shamrock Memorial Cup. On September 30, 2017, he won the MCW Heavyweight Championship. In July 2018 he made four appearances on House of Hardcore's Australian tour. He would lose to the likes of Tommy Dreamer, Al Snow and Swoggle on the shows. He also appeared in Lucha Underground in August 2018 as "Joey Wrestling", as part of former tag team partner Johnny Mundo's (previously Johnny Nitro) stable Worldwide Underground. The following week, he lost his only Lucha Underground match to Matanza Cueto, after which he was "sacrificed to the gods," killing off his character in the show. That is the last match he has competed in to date.

=== Ring of Honor (2018–2019) ===
On May 19, 2018, he became one of the trainers at ROH's Baltimore Dojo a training school for the Ring of Honor promotion. Later on February 2, 2019, it was revealed that he would now be working as a producer, trainer and a member of the creative team for Ring of Honor going forward. In October 2019, he departed from Ring of Honor as a producer.

== Personal life ==
During an interview in late 2007, Birch revealed that he had been using drugs since he was 15 and had mixed cocaine, crack, and heroin with alcohol: "I've been a drug addict and alcoholic since I was 15 years old, right before I started in wrestling – so that's the better part of 15 years." As a result of this, Birch has overdosed three times and wrecked ten cars. He entered rehab in 2006 and missed six months of work. Due to the facial injury he suffered at Armageddon in December 2006, Birch then became addicted to painkillers. After a direct intervention by Vince McMahon, Birch was released from the WWE and he credits this with helping him to address his addictions. After his release, CM Punk helped pay for his house, which was on the verge of foreclosure after losing his job.

Birch had a three-and-a-half-year relationship with Mickie James, and they lived together in Virginia before breaking up. He also briefly dated Christy Hemme.

== Championships and accomplishments ==
- Atlantic Terror Championship Wrestling
  - ATCW Tag Team Championship (1 time) – with Christian York
- American Wrestling Council
  - AWC Light Heavyweight Championship (1 time)
- Dynamite Championship Wrestling
  - DCW Tag Team Championship (1 time) – with Christian York
- Independent Professional Wrestling Alliance
  - IPWA Light Heavyweight Championship (2 times)
- MCW Pro Wrestling
  - MCW Cruiserweight Championship (1 time)
  - MCW Heavyweight Championship (4 times)
  - MCW Rage Television Championship (1 time)
  - MCW Tag Team Championship (2 times) – with Christian York
  - Shane Shamrock Memorial Cup (2001, 2017)
- Mid-Eastern Wrestling Federation
  - MEWF Tag Team Championship (1 time) – with Christian York
- National Championship Wrestling
  - NCW Light Heavyweight Championship (1 time)
- National Wrestling Alliance
  - NWA Light Heavyweight Championship (1 time)
  - NWA World Tag Team Championship (1 time) – with Christian York
- New York Wrestling Connection
  - NYWC Heavyweight Championship (1 time)
- Organization of Modern Extreme Grappling Arts
  - OMEGA Light Heavyweight Championship (2 times)
- Ohio Valley Wrestling
  - OVW Southern Tag Team Championship (1 time) – with Johnny Nitro
  - OVW Television Championship (1 time)
- Pro-Pain Pro Wrestling
  - 3PW Heavyweight Championship (1 time)
- Pro Wrestling Illustrated
  - Tag Team of the Year (2005) - with Johnny Nitro
  - PWI ranked him No. 74 of the top 500 singles wrestlers in the PWI 500 in 2005
- Southern Championship Wrestling
  - SCW Junior Heavyweight Championship (3 times)
- Steel City Wrestling
  - SCW Television Championship (1 time)
  - SCW Tag Team Championship (1 time) – with Christian York
- Ultimate Championship Wrestling
  - UCW Heavyweight Championship (1 time)
- Vanguard Championship Wrestling
  - VCW Tag Team Championship (1 time) – with Christian York
- Virginia Championship Wrestling
  - VCW Tag Team Championship (1 time) – with Christian York
- World Wrestling Entertainment
  - WWE Tag Team Championship (3 times) – with Johnny Nitro
