= Dumb Bitch =

Dumb Bitch may refer to:

- "Dumb Bitch", a song from Esham's 1992 album Judgement Day
- "Dumb Bitch", a song from Cam'ron's 2014 EP 1st of the Month Vol. 3
- "Dumb Bitch", a song from Mickie James' 2010 album Strangers & Angels

== See also ==
- "Stupid Bitch", a song by Aja Smith, featured in Vol. 4: The Redemption, 2005
