= Thomas Nelson Page =

American author and diplomat

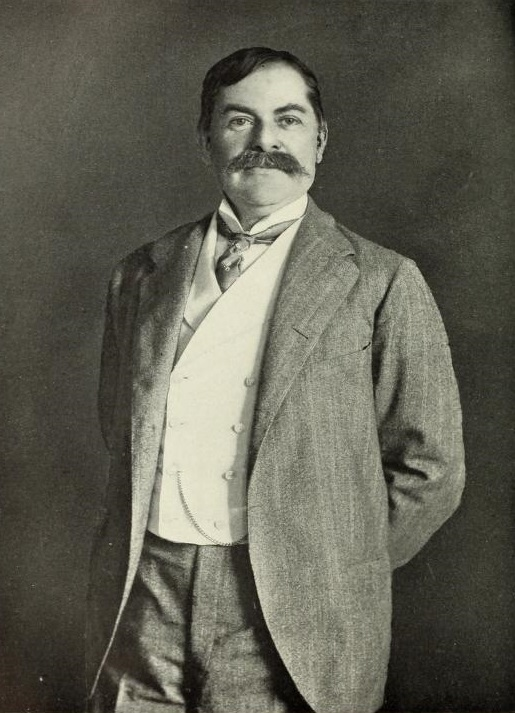
- A 1903 portrait photograph of Page by Frances Benjamin Johnston
- Born: April 23, 1853; Oakland, Montpelier, Virginia, U.S.
- Died: November 1, 1922 (aged 69); Oakland, Montpelier, Virginia, U.S.
- Resting place: Rock Creek Cemetery; Washington, D.C., U.S.
- Spouse: Florence Lathrop Field
- Relatives: Anne Elizabeth Wilson

United States Ambassador to Italy
- In office October 12, 1913 – June 21, 1919
- President: Woodrow Wilson
- Preceded by: Thomas J. O'Brien
- Succeeded by: Robert Underwood Johnson

Signature
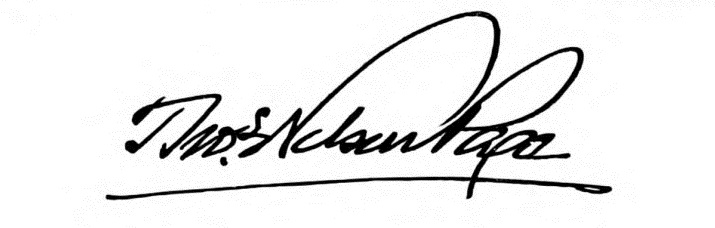

Thomas Nelson Page (April 23, 1853 – November 1, 1922) was an American lawyer, politician, and writer. He served as the U.S. ambassador to Italy from 1913 to 1919 under the administration of President Woodrow Wilson during World War I.

In his writing, Page popularized Plantation tradition literature which was used to promote the Lost Cause myth across the New South. Page first got the public's attention with his story "Marse Chan" which was published in the Century Illustrated Monthly Magazine. Page's most notable works include The Burial of the Guns and In Ole Virginia.

== Life and career ==
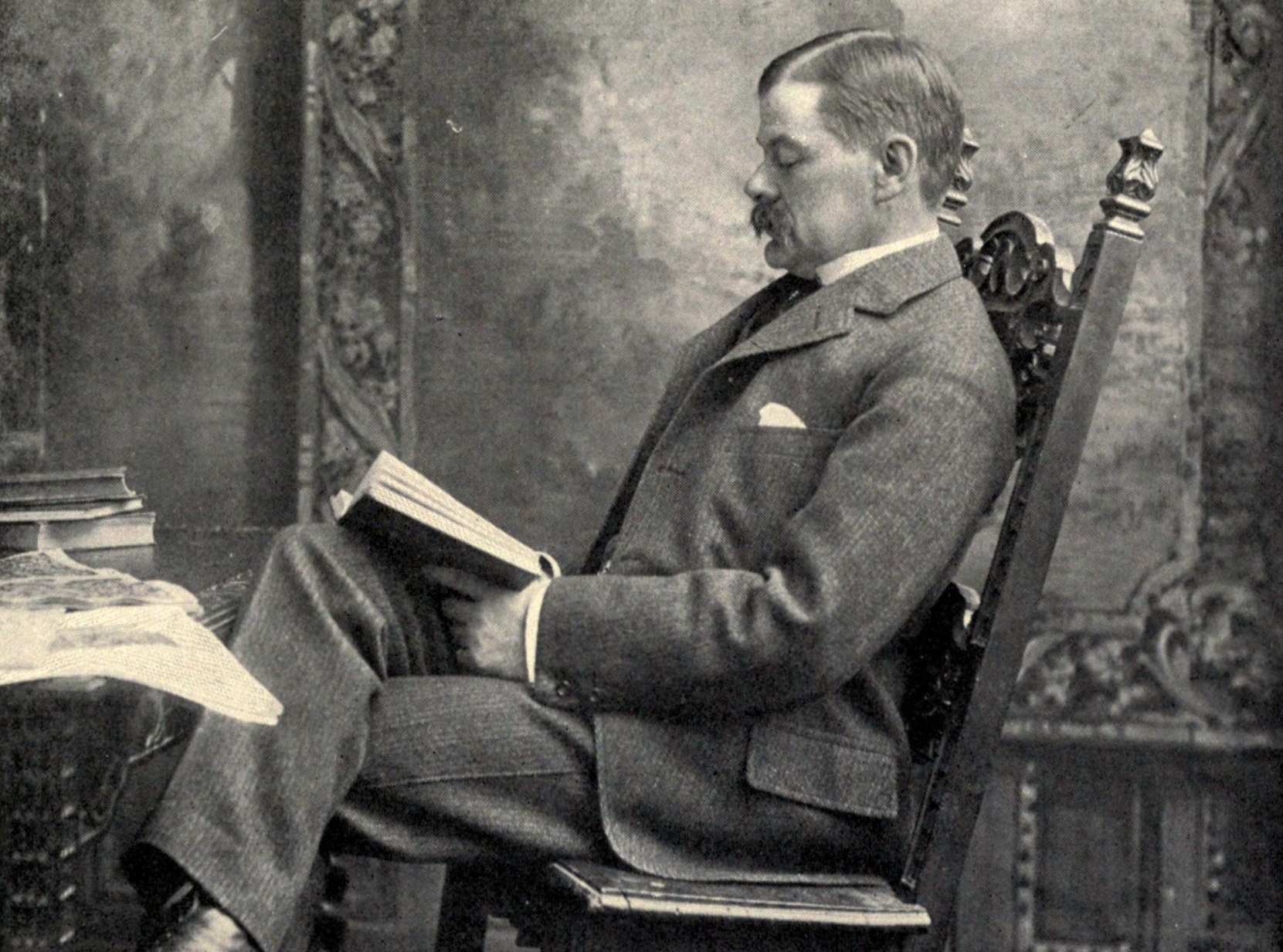
Page in 1903

Page was born on one of the Nelson family's plantations, Oakland, near the village of Beaverdam in Hanover County, Virginia. He was the son to John Page, a lawyer and a plantation owner, and Elizabeth Burwell (Nelson). He was a scion of the prominent Nelson and Page families, each First Families of Virginia.

Although he was from once-wealthy lineage, after the American Civil War, which began when he was only 8 years old, his parents and their relatives were largely impoverished during Reconstruction and his teenage years.

In 1869, he entered Washington College, known now as Washington and Lee University, in Lexington, Virginia when Robert E. Lee was president of the college. In Page's later literary works, Robert E. Lee would come to serve as the model figure of Southern Heroism. Page left Washington College before graduation for financial reasons after three years, but continued to desire an education specifically in law. To earn money to pay for his degree, Page tutored the children of his cousins in Kentucky. From 1873 to 1874, he was enrolled in the law school of the University of Virginia. At Washington College and thereafter at UVA, Nelson was a member of the fraternity of Delta Psi, (St. Anthony Hall).

In 1890, Page participated in the organizational meetings that led to the creation of the Virginia Society of the Sons of the American Revolution (Virginia SAR). At the February 28 conference in Washington, D.C., he was elected the Society’s first Secretary, and he was present when the Virginia Society was formally chartered in Richmond on July 7, 1890.

== Career ==
Admitted to the Virginia Bar Association, he practiced as a lawyer in Richmond between 1876 and 1893, and also began his writing career. In 1893, Page, who had become disillusioned with the Southern legal system, gave up his practice entirely and moved with his wife to Washington, D.C.

There, he wrote eighteen books that were compiled and published in 1912. Page popularized the plantation tradition genre of Southern writing, which told of an idealized version of life before the Civil War, with contented slaves working for beloved masters and their families. Page viewed the Antebellum South as a representation of moral purity, and often vilified the reforms of the Gilded Age as a sign of moral decline.

His 1887 collection of short stories, In Ole Virginia, is Page's quintessential work, providing a depiction of the Antebellum South. His most well-known short-story from that collection was "Marse Chan". "Marse Chan" was popularized because of Page's ability to capture southern dialect. Another short-story collection of his is entitled The Burial of the Guns (1894). As a result of his literary success, Page was popular amongst the Capital elite, and was regularly invited to socialize with politicians from around the country. During the first quarter of the 20th century, he founded a library in the Sycamore Tavern structure near Montpelier, Virginia, in memory of his wife, Florence Lathrop Page.

Under President Woodrow Wilson, Page was appointed as U.S. ambassador to Italy for six years between 1913 and 1919. There he supported the Czechoslovak Legion in Italy. Despite being untrained in Italian and having little experience in governmental affairs, Page was determined to do a good job. He eventually learned Italian, formed beneficial relationships with Italian government officials, and accurately reported on the Italian state during World War I. Page managed to maintain and improve American-Italian relations during World War I, and provided a sympathetic ear to the Italian and Triple Entente cause in the U.S. government. After a disagreement with President Wilson over the terms of the Treaty of Versailles, in which he argued for increased Italian benefits, Page resigned his post in 1919. His book entitled Italy and the World War (1920) is a memoir of his service there.

After returning to his home in Oakland, Virginia, Page continued to write for the remainder of his years.

== Writing themes ==
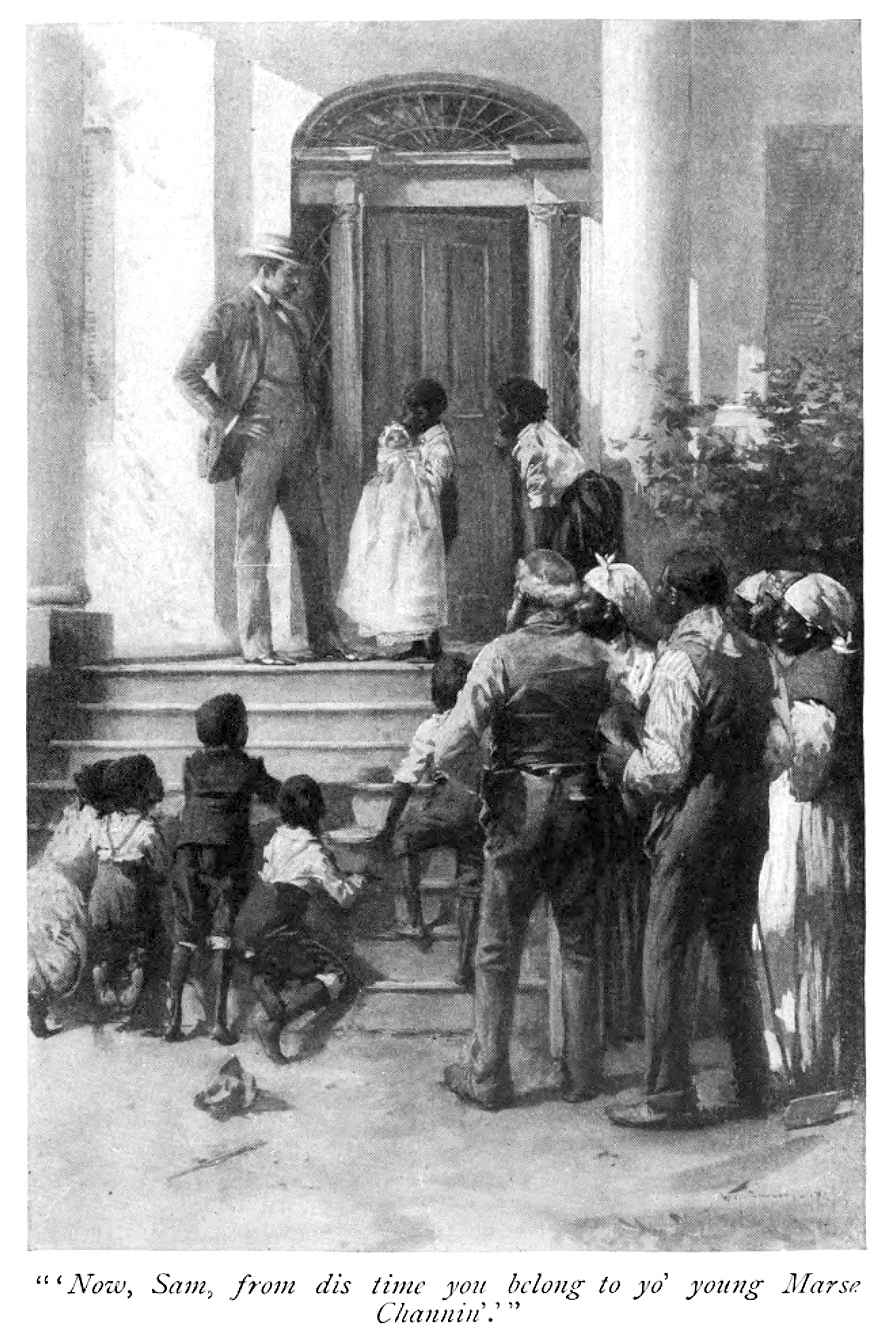
Illustration from Marse Chan: The slave boy Sam, the narrator of the story, "is allowed to hold his newborn “master” while his owner and a dozen other faithful slaves look on in admiration."

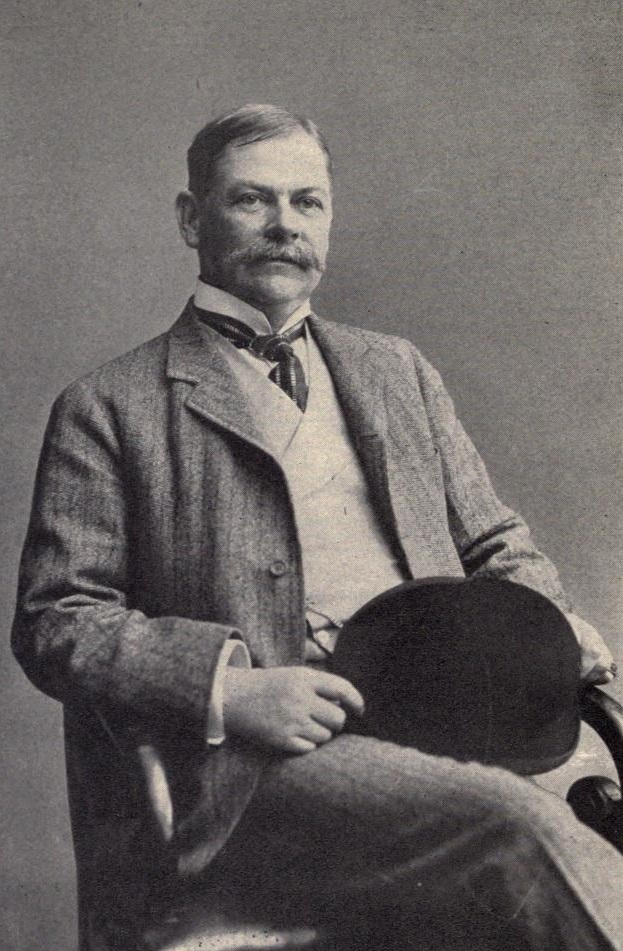
Thomas Nelson Page

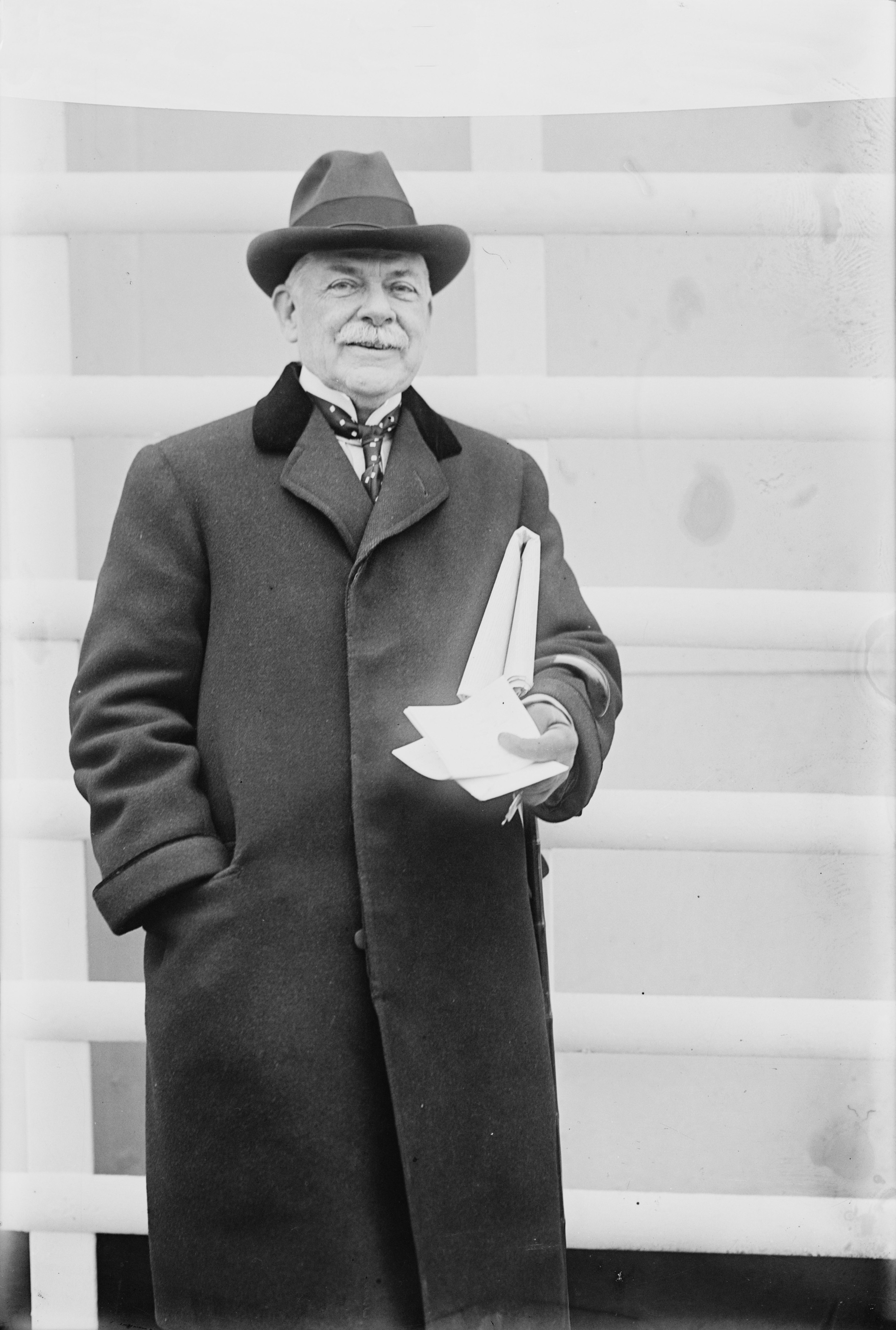
Thomas Nelson Page in 1916.

Page's postbellum fiction featured a nostalgic view of the South in step with what is termed Lost Cause ideology. Emphasizing the element of noblesse oblige within the historical reality of slavery, enslaved people are depicted as faithful, happy and simple, slotted into a paternalistic society. For example, the formerly enslaved person in "Marse Chan" is uneducated, speaks phonetically, and has unrelenting admiration for his former master. The gentry are noble and principled, with fealty to country and to chivalry—they seem like knights of a different age. The strain epitomized by Page would carry through the postwar era, cropping up again in art with films like The Birth of a Nation. The ideology and thoughts that appear in Page's writing and in Southern ideology are no mere simplistic, archaic world-view; they are part of a complex history that has informed, for worse and for better, the evolution of the Southern mind to 1940.

Thomas Nelson Page lamented that the slavery-era "good old darkies" had been replaced by the "new issue" (Blacks born after slavery) whom he described as "lazy, thriftless, intemperate, insolent, dishonest, and without the most rudimentary elements of morality" (pp. 80, 163). Page, who helped popularize the images of cheerful and devoted Mammies and Sambos in his early books, became one of the first writers to introduce a literary black brute.

In 1898 he published Red Rock, a Reconstruction novel, with the heinous figure of Moses, a loathsome and sinister Black politician. Moses tried to rape a white woman: "He gave a snarl of rage and sprang at her like a wild beast" (pp. 356–358). The depiction of rape using animal metaphors was a common feature of American sentimental literature. He was later lynched for "a terrible crime".

Page dealt with the morality of lynching by acquitting the mob from any guilt, holding, instead, the supposedly debased Blacks responsible for their own violent executions. In his 1904 essay, The Negro: The Southerner's Problem, he advocated for the white man's right to lynch:

Lynching does not end ravishing, and that is the prime necessity... The charge that is often made, that the innocent are sometimes lynched, has little foundation. The rage of a mob is not directed against the innocent, but against the guilty; and its fury would not be satisfied with any other sacrifices than the death of the real criminal. Nor does the criminal merit any consideration, however terrible the punishment. The real injury is to the perpetrators of the crime of destroying the law, and to the community in which the law is slain...

The crime of lynching is not likely to cease until the crime of ravishing and murdering women and children is less frequent than it has been of late. And this crime, which is well-nigh wholly confined to the Negro race, will not greatly diminish until the Negroes themselves take it in hand and stamp it out...

As the crime of rape of late years had its baleful renascence in the teaching of equality and the placing of power in the ignorant Negroes' hands, so its perpetuation and increase have undoubtedly been due in large part to the same teaching. The intelligent Negro may understand what social equality truly means, but to the ignorant and brutal young Negro, it signifies but one thing: the opportunity to enjoy, equally with white men, the privilege of cohabiting with white women.

Likewise, Thomas Nelson Page complained that African American leaders should cease "talk of social equality that inflames the ignorant Negro," and instead, work to stop "the crime of ravishing and murdering women and children."

== Reception and criticism ==
Thomas Nelson Page was one of the best-known writers of his day. He served as Woodrow Wilson's ambassador to Italy, and the president referred to him as a "national ornament".

In her effort to control the image of slavery and Civil War in the American mind, Mildred Lewis Rutherford, historian general of the United Daughters of the Confederacy from 1911 to 1916, urged that "no library should be without…all of Thomas Nelson Page's books".

Modern historian David W. Blight calls it "America's national tragedy" that American memory was informed by the "romantic fantasies" of writers like Page and Joel Chandler Harris, while the authentic memories of former slaves were largely forgotten. He approvingly cites Sterling A. Brown's ironical criticism: "Thomas Nelson Page was not lying in his eulogy of the mammy…Page's feeling is honest if child-like. I am sure that he loved his mammy to death."

== Personal life ==
He was married to Anne Seddon Bruce on July 28, 1886. She died on December 21, 1888, of a throat hemorrhage. He remarried on June 6, 1893, to Florence Lathrop Field, a daughter of Jedediah Hyde Lathrop and the widowed sister-in-law of retailer Marshall Field (her husband Henry Field had died less than three years earlier). Page's second wife Florence was a member of the prestigious Barbour family, making Page a member by marriage. Their wedding was held at the Elmhurst, Illinois Byrd's Nest estate of Thomas Barbour Bryan and his wife Jennie Byrd Bryan (née Page). Thomas Barbour Bryan was Florence's maternal uncle, while Jennie Byrd Bryan was distant cousins with Mr. Page (meaning that the Bryans' children –Jennie and Thomas– were both distant relatives of both Nelson Page, and first cousins of his second wife).

Page was an activist in stimulating the Association for the Preservation of Virginia Antiquities to mobilize to save historical sites at Yorktown and elsewhere, especially in the Historic Triangle of Virginia, from loss to development. He was involved in gaining Federal funding to build a seawall at Jamestown in 1900, protecting a site where the remains of James Fort were later discovered by archaeologists working on the Jamestown Rediscovery project.

He died in 1922 at the age of 69 at Oakland, Virginia in Hanover County, Virginia.

== Publications ==
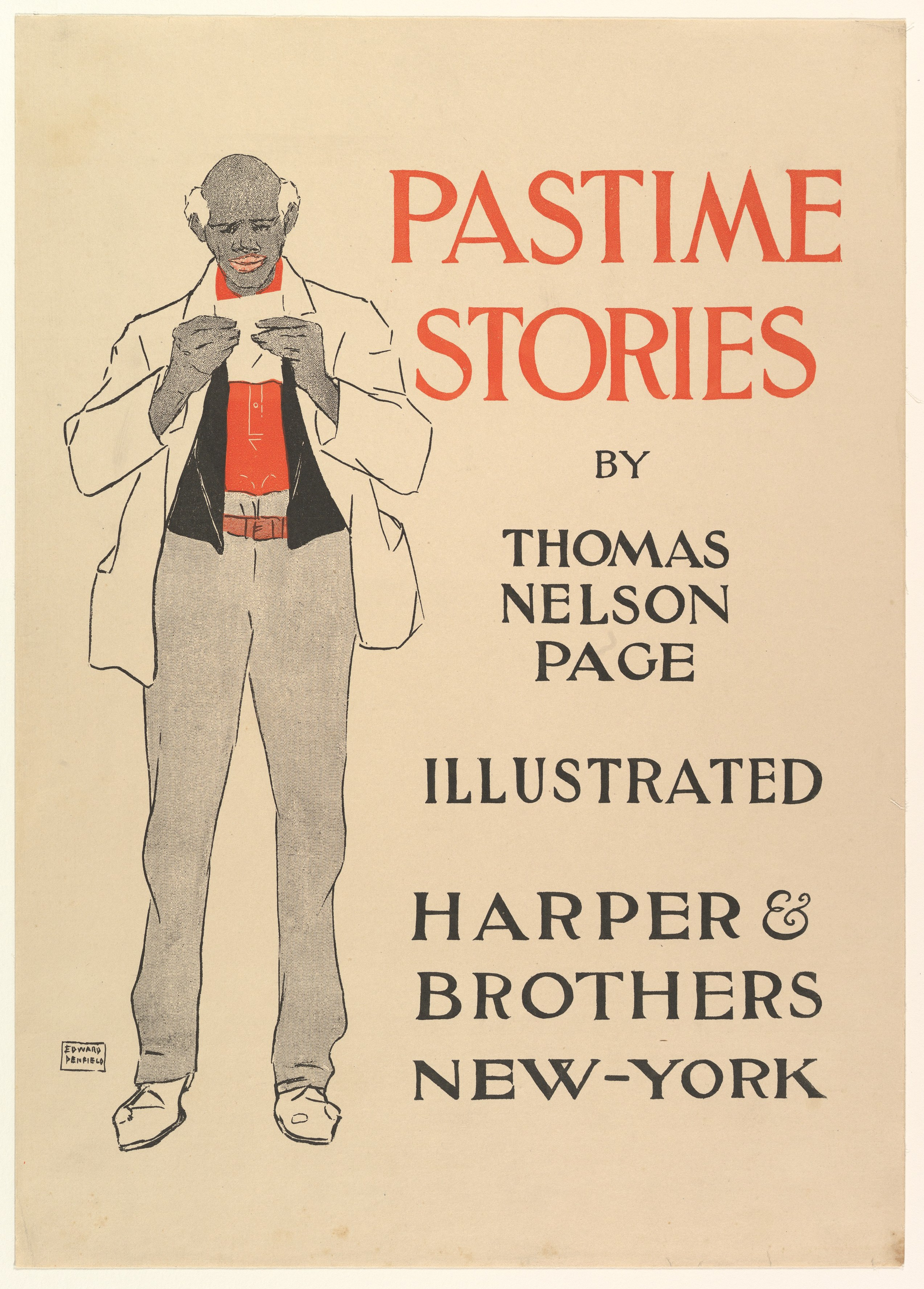
Edward Penfield poster for Pastime Stories, published in 1894

- In Ole Virginia, or Marse Chan and Other Stories (1887) short stories.
- Befo' de War: Echoes in Negro Dialect (1888) poems.
- Two Little Confederates (1888) short novel for young readers.
- Among the Camps (1891) short stories for young readers.
- Elsket, and Other Stories (1891) short stories.
- On Newfound River (1891) novel.
- The Old South: Essays Social and Political (1892) essays.
- The Burial of the Guns (1894) short stories and one novella.
- Pastime Stories (1894) short stories.
- Unc' Edinburg: A Plantation Echo (1895).
- Social Life in Old Virginia Before the War (1896).
- The Old Gentleman of the Black Stock (1897) novella.
- Red Rock: A Chronicle of Reconstruction (1898) novel.
- Santa Claus's Partner (1899).
- A Captured Santa Claus (1900).
- Gordon Keith (1903) novel.
- Two Prisoners (1903).
- Bred in the Bone (1904) short stories.
- The Negro (1905).
- The Coast of Bohemia (1907) poems.
- John Marvel, Assistant (1907) novel.
- Under the Crust (1907) short stories and one play.
- The Old Dominion: Her Making and Her Manners (1908) essays.
- Tommy Trot's Visit to Santa Claus (1908).
- Robert E. Lee: The Southerner (1908).
- Mount Vernon and Its Preservation, 1858-1910 (1910).
- Robert E. Lee: Man and Soldier (1911).
- The Land of the Spirit (1913).
- The Page Story Book (1914).
- The Stranger's Pew (1914) short story.
- The Shepherd Who Watched by Night (1916).
- Address at the Three Hundredth Anniversary of the Settlement of Jamestown (1919).
- Italy and the World War (1920).
- Dante and His Influence: Studies (1922).
- The Red Riders (1924).

Selected articles

- "Lee in Defeat," The South Atlantic Quarterly, Vol. VI (1907).
- "The Spirit of a People Manifested in their Art," Art and Progress, Vol. II (1910).
- "Our Relation to Art," The American Magazine of Art, Vol. XIII (1922).

Collected works

- The Novels, Stories, Sketches and Poems of Thomas Nelson Page (18 vols., 1910–12).

== See also ==
- Thomas Nelson Page House, listed on the National Register of Historic Places

Diplomatic posts
Preceded by Thomas J. O'Brien	United States Ambassador to Italy; October 12, 1913 – June 21, 1919	Succeeded by Robert Underwood Johnson
