= Somebody's Gonna Pay =

Studio album by Mickie James
- Released: May 7, 2013
- Recorded: 2012–13
- Genre: Country
- Length: 45:58
- Label: Entertainment One
- Producer: R.S. Field

Mickie James chronology
Strangers & Angels (2010)	Somebody's Gonna Pay (2013)

Singles from Somebody's Gonna Pay
- 1. "Hardcore Country" Released: December 17, 2010; 2. "Somebody's Gonna Pay" Released: February 13, 2013

Somebody's Gonna Pay is the second studio album by American professional wrestler and country singer Mickie James. Released on May 7, 2013, by Entertainment One. The album incorporates country and also blends some elements of blues and southern rock. It was produced by R.S. Field. A bonus track on the album, "Hardcore Country", served as James' entrance music during her time in Impact Wrestling, where she was a multi-time world champion. Notably, she entered the 2022 WWE Royal Rumble using the theme and carrying the Impact Knockouts World Championship belt, making her the first wrestler to appear in WWE while recognized as an Impact champion.

== Background ==
The album was initially envisioned as a six-track Extended play, partially funded through a Kickstarter campaign. The campaign raised over $16,500, exceeding James' original target of $5,000 which allowed her to expand the project into a full-length album. Following the campaign's success, James signed with Entertainment One Music, which supported the album's promotion and distribution.

The album’s title track, "Somebody's Gonna Pay," was initially presented to James by her producer, R.S. Field. Originally performed by Jamie Hartford in a traditional country style, James was initially unsure about recording the song. However, Field suggested modernizing it with additional guitars to give it a more rock-oriented sound, which ultimately led to the song becoming the album's title track.

== Recording and production ==
The music video for the title track, "Somebody's Gonna Pay", was filmed at the Red Rooster bar in Nashville, Tennessee, and directed by Blake Judd, known for his work with artists like Bucky Covington and Shooter Jennings. The video features a storyline involving professional wrestlers Trish Stratus and James’ future husband Nick Aldis, James described the experience of shooting the video with friends and fellow wrestlers as "very special".

== Track listing ==
No.	Title	Length
1.	"Somebody's Gonna Pay"	3:49
2.	"Best Damn Night"	3:52
3.	"Whatever Turns You On"	3:17
4.	"A Good Time"	3:37
5.	"Long Way Down"	3:48
6.	"If I Can't Be Me"	4:20
7.	"Goin' Fast"	2:43
8.	"I'm Gone Song"	4:18
9.	"80 Proof"	4:43
10.	"Hurts Don't It"	3:39
11.	"I Just Wanna Do My Thing"	4:34
12.	"Hardcore Country"	3:11

== Charts ==
Chart (2013)	Peak position
US Top Country Albums (Billboard)	56
US Heatseekers Albums (Billboard)	15
