= Montpelier Historic District (Montpelier, Virginia) =

Historic district in Virginia, United States

- U.S. National Register of Historic Places
- U.S. Historic district
- Virginia Landmarks Register
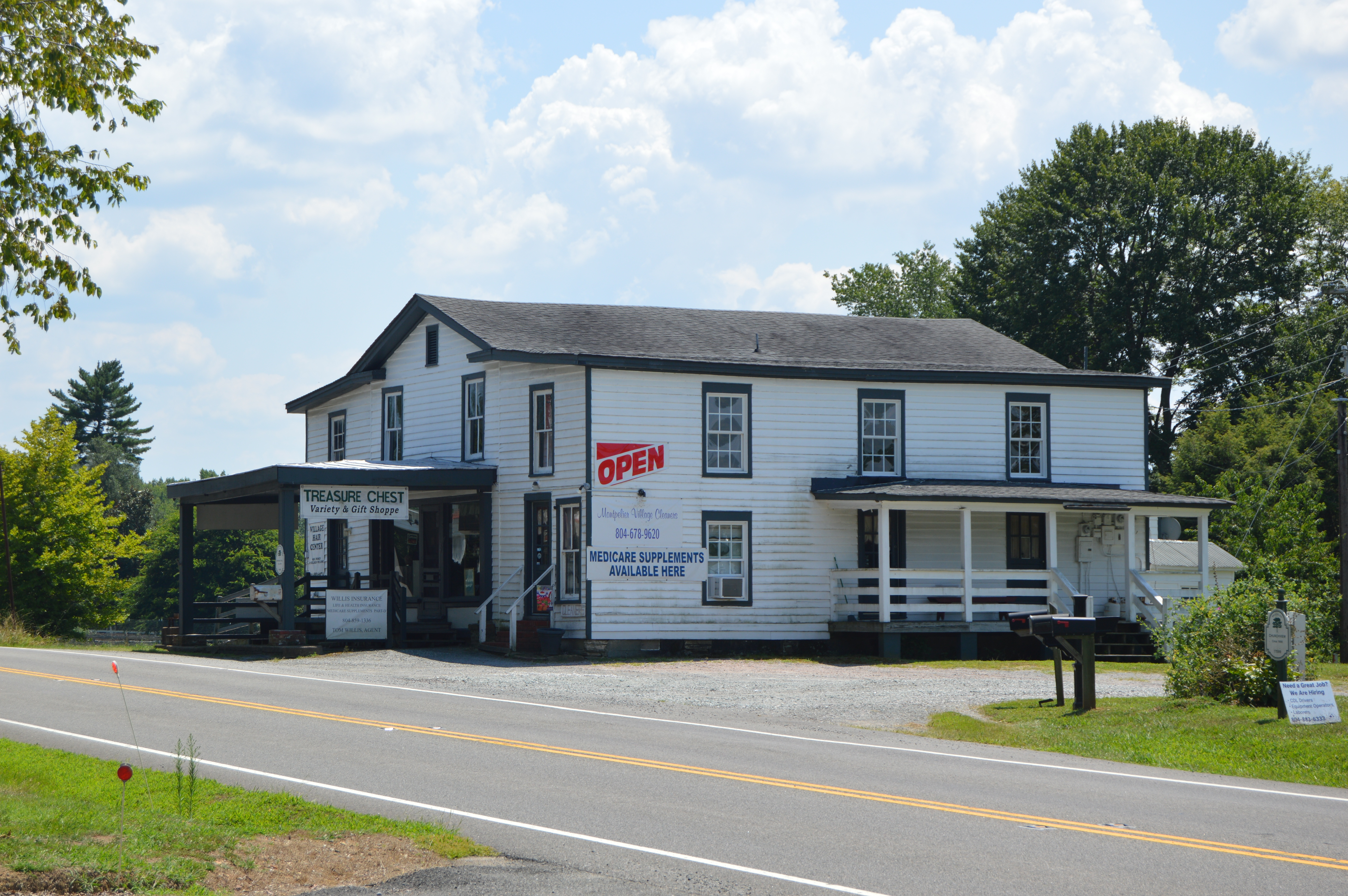
- Commercial buildings along U.S. Route 33

- Location within Virginia Location within the United States
- Location: Roughly along Mountain Rd., Montpelier, Virginia
- Coordinates: 37°49′09″N 77°41′04″W
- Area: 152.8 acres (61.8 ha)
- Built: 1732
- Architect: Hartsook, L.P.; Hogue, E.S.
- Architectural style: Colonial, Late 19th And 20th Century Revivals
- NRHP reference No.: 02000517
- VLR No.: 042-5016

Significant dates
- Added to NRHP: May 16, 2002
- Designated VLR: March 14, 2001

Montpelier Historic District is a national historic district located at Montpelier, Hanover County, Virginia. The district includes 43 contributing buildings and 1 contributing site in the village of Montpelier. It includes residences, agricultural buildings, stores, businesses, a church, schools and libraries that illustrate the wide range of building types. Notable buildings include the old school (1876), Church of Our Savior (1882), Grange Hall (1899), Hobart Hardware (c. 1900), Montpelier School (1929), "Norway" House (1936), and "The Oaks" (1936). Located in the district and listed separately is the Sycamore Tavern, the only 18th-century building remaining in the district.

It was listed on the National Register of Historic Places in 2002.
