= SCW Diva Championship =

Professional wrestling women's championship

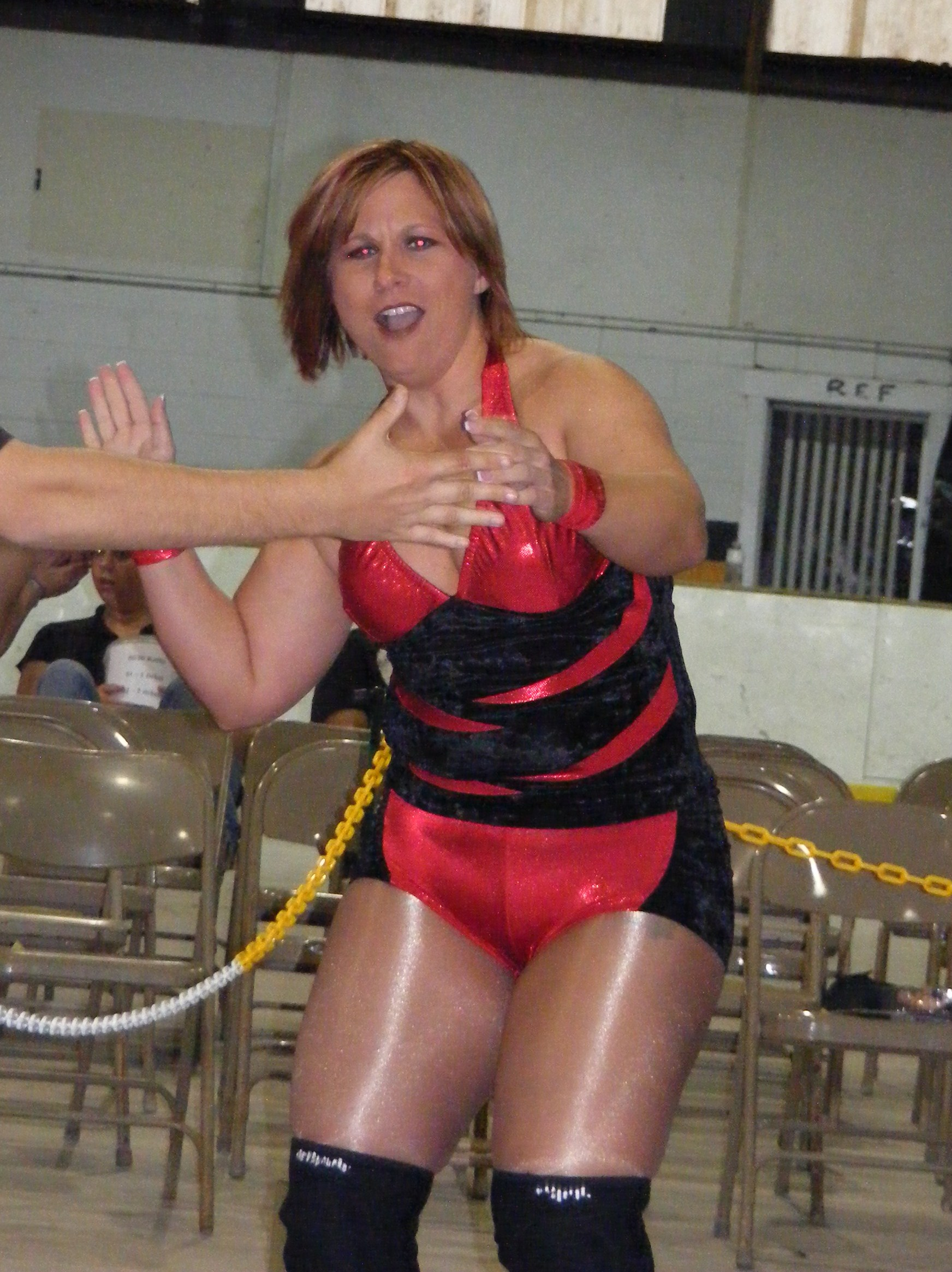
- Lexie Fyfe was the final SCW Diva Champion.

Details
- Promotion: Southern Championship Wrestling
- Date established: April 26, 2001
- Date retired: November 20, 2004

Other name
- SCW Women's Championship
Statistics
- First champion: Alexis Laree
- Final champions: Lexie Fyfe (won November 20, 2004)
- Longest reign: Alexis Laree (847 days)
- Shortest reign: Lexie Fyfe (<1 day)

The SCW Diva Championship (also known as the SCW Women's Championship) was a women's professional wrestling championship in the Southern Championship Wrestling (SCW) promotion. The title remained active until August 2003 when Alexis Laree signed a developmental contract with World Wrestling Entertainment. The championship was brought back at SCW's final show, Blowout Bash, on November 20, 2004, where Lexie Fyfe defeated Brandi Wine to win the vacant title. Fyfe, an SCW mainstay, had specifically requested a match for the event.

The inaugural champion was Alexis Laree, who won a 6-woman "Diva Battle Royal", which included Lilly, Bubbles, Ariel Hope, and Cheyenne, by eliminating Persephone on April 26, 2001 at SCW's Royal Pain. There have been a total of 2 recognized champions who have had a combined 2 official reigns. The following is a chronological list of wrestlers that have been SCW Diva Champion by ring name.

== Title history ==
=== Names ===
Name	Years
SCW Diva Championship	2001 — 2004

=== Reigns ===
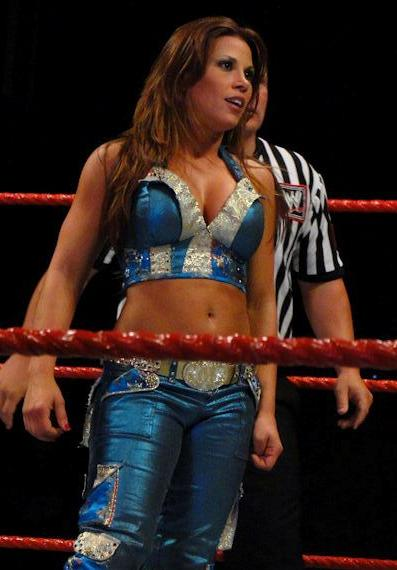
Alexis Laree, who was the longest-reigning SCW Diva Champion

Key
No.	Overall reign number
Reign	Reign number for the specific champion
Days	Number of days held

No.	Champion	Championship change			Reign statistics		Notes	Ref.
No.	Champion	Date	Event	Location	Reign	Days	Notes	Ref.
1	Alexis Laree	April 26, 2001	Royal Pain	Raleigh, NC	1	847	Laree won a six-woman battle royal to become the inaugural champion.	
—	Vacated	August 21, 2003	—	—	—	—	SCW vacated the championship after Alexis Laree leaves the promotion for World Wrestling Entertainment.	
2	Lexie Fyfe	November 20, 2004	Blowout Bash	Durham, NC	1	<1	Fyfe defeated Brandi Wine to win the vacant championship.	
—	Deactivated	November 20, 2004	—	—	—	—	SCW closed on November 20, 2004 and Lexie Fyfe was the final champion in SCW as a company.	
