= Gordon Keith (novel) =

1903 book

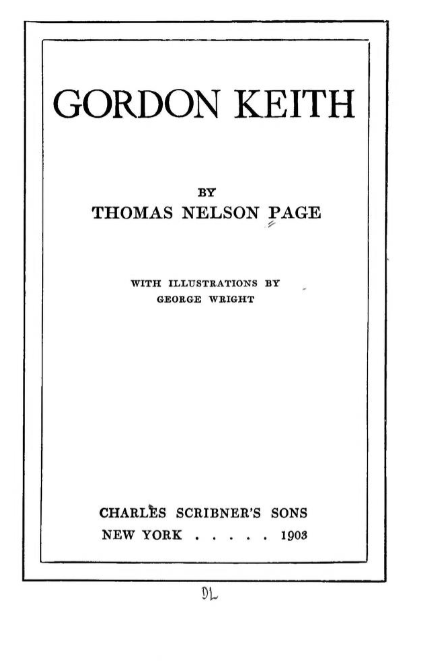
- Title page for Gordon Keith (1903)
- Author: Thomas Nelson Page
- Language: English
- Genre: Historical fiction, Social novel
- Publisher: Charles Scribner's Sons
- Publication date: 1903
- Publication place: United States
- Media type: Print (Hardcover)

Gordon Keith is a 1903 novel by the American writer and diplomat Thomas Nelson Page.

== Plot summary ==
Gordon Keith is the son of a formerly wealthy Southern family that lost its plantation, "Elphinstone", in the aftermath of the American Civil War. The novel follows him as he builds a career in Appalachia and New York in an attempt to earn enough to recover his family's estate. He is eventually successful and returns home to the South.

== Contemporary reception ==
In The Chicago Tribune, Jeanette L. Gilder wrote that the book was an enjoyable read and that it had a particularly compelling romantic sub-plot. A review of the book in The Atlanta Journal praised the book's "wisdom, wit, and philosophy" and its value as a historical record of how the Civil War affected wealthy Southern families. However, the reviewer also criticised the book's length and described its plot as overly complex. The book was similarly described as "unusually long" and "rather overcrowded with characters" in The Academy and Literature. An earlier review of the book in the same publication called the novel "very wearisome" and too crowded with various plot events to function as an effective character study. In The Spectator, a reviewer wrote that the book had an effective beginning, but that it failed to maintain the reader's interest beyond the first 200 pages.
