= Oakland (Montpelier, Virginia) =

Historic house in Virginia, United States

- U.S. National Register of Historic Places
- Virginia Landmarks Register
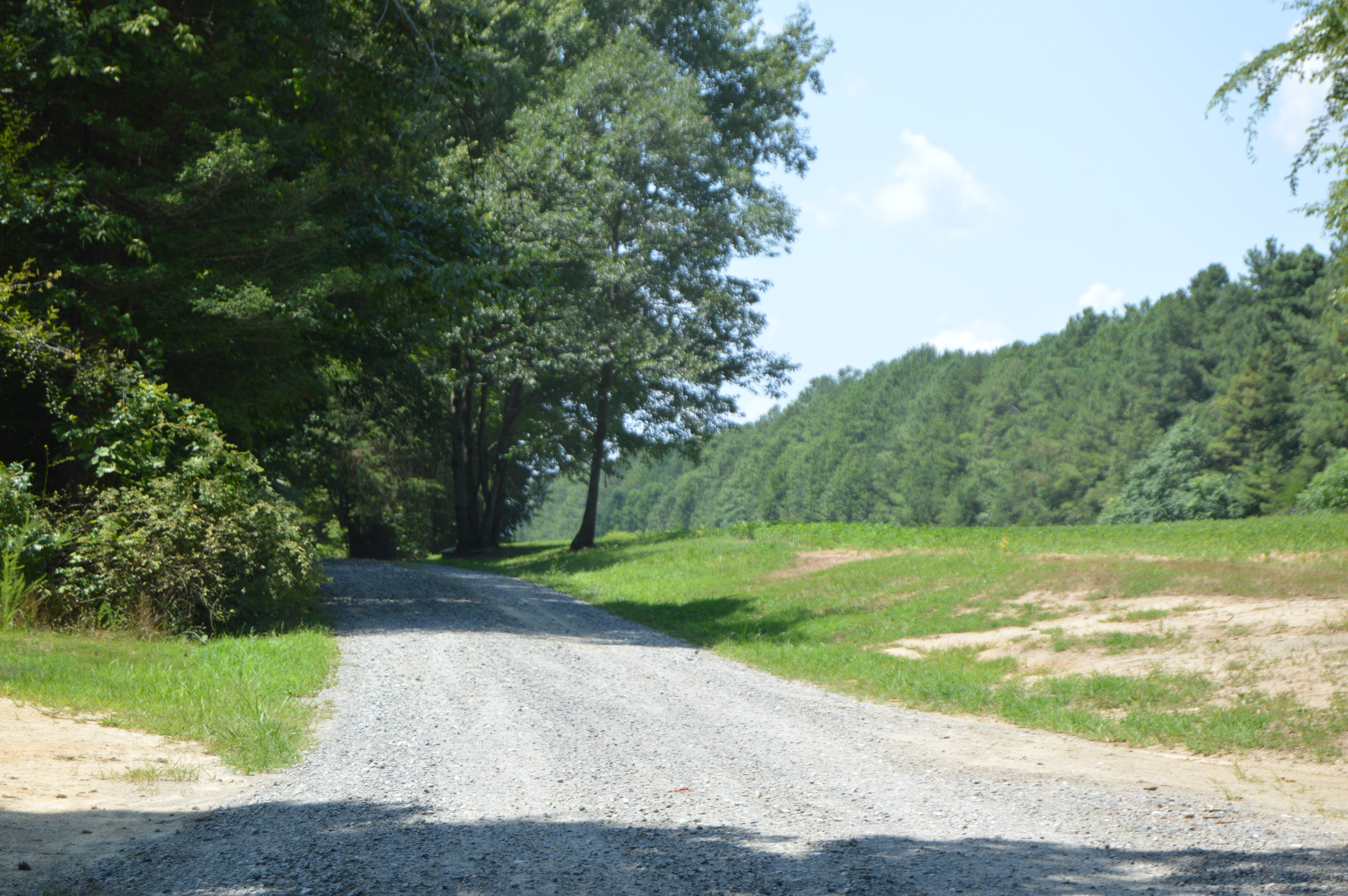
- Property entrance

- Location within Virginia Location within the United States
- Location: North of Montpelier, Virginia
- Coordinates: 37°52′30″N 77°39′49″W
- Area: 145 acres (59 ha)
- Built: 1898
- NRHP reference No.: 74002123
- VLR No.: 042-0024

Significant dates
- Added to NRHP: July 30, 1974
- Designated VLR: February 19, 1974

Oakland is a historic home located near Montpelier, Hanover County, Virginia. It was built in 1898–1846, and is a 1 1/2-story, three-bay, frame farmhouse, with a 2 1/2-story, three-bay by five bay, rambling wing. It was built on the foundations of a house built in 1812 that was destroyed by fire. Also on the property are a contributing smokehouse and office. Oakland was the home and birthplace of the Virginia novelist, Thomas Nelson Page.

It was listed on the National Register of Historic Places in 1974.
