= Lexie Fyfe =

American professional wrestler (born 1969)

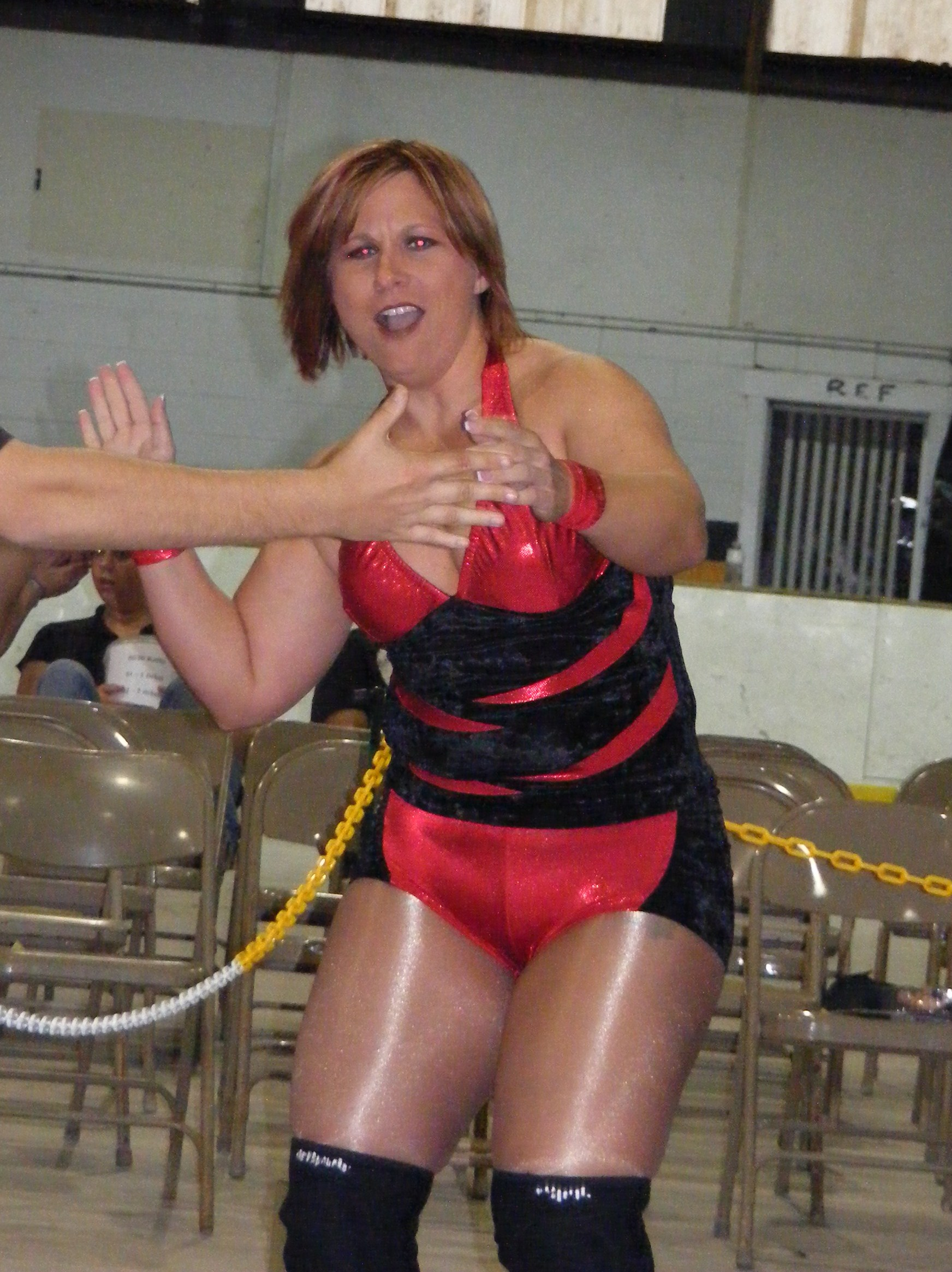
- Lexie Fyfe in 2008

Personal information
- Born: Mary Beth Bentley; May 30, 1969 (age 57) Denville, New Jersey, U.S.

Professional wrestling career
- Ring name(s): The Foxy Lady; Fran, The Lunch Lady; Lexie Fyfe; Lexie
- Billed height: 5 ft 4 in (1.63 m)
- Billed weight: 150 lb (68 kg; 11 st)
- Billed from: Tampa, Florida
- Trained by: OMEGA Championship Wrestling; Ken Spence; Johnny Rodz
- Debut: 1995

Mary Beth Bentley (born May 30, 1969), better known by her ring name Lexie Fyfe, is an American professional wrestler. She has wrestled in various independent wrestling promotions, most notably for Shimmer Women Athletes. She is a one-time NWA World Women's Champion. She also appeared on WWE Raw as the "fake Hillary Clinton."

== Early life ==
Bentley was born in Denville Township, New Jersey, where she spent most of her life, attending Morris Knolls High School. She spent a couple of years in Toledo, Ohio and St. Petersburg, Florida when she was very young.

Bentley went to Elon College in North Carolina and has resided in Tampa, Florida, after a couple of years in Jeffersonville, Indiana.

== Professional wrestling career ==
While working in billing at LabCorp, Bentley met co-worker Brandi Wine who asked if she had an interest in training to become a wrestler. Brandi was valeting at the time for the "Beastmaster" Rick Link and Tim Blaze. She introduced Lexie to some local promoters who were looking for female wrestlers. Ken Spence, who runs a wrestling school in Winston-Salem, North Carolina, talked her into coming early to one of the next shows. She got in the ring with a couple of the wrestlers and learned some simple moves. She started training at Ken's school right after that in April 1995.

She stayed at Spence's school for a little over a year while learning the basic techniques of wrestling. Feeling that she needed to become more versatile and learn different styles, she left Spence's school. Then she had met Matt Hardy on a show and he invited her down to their training place. In fact, she was thinking about leaving wrestling because she didn't feel that she was progressing in the ring. She learned so much there especially about the psychology of a wrestling match. Also, she had the chance to learn valuable skills from the "unpredictable" Johnny Rodz, who has trained stars including as Tazz and Perry Saturn. She visited his school at least six times on various trips to the New York area.

Fyfe made brief appearances for the World Wrestling Federation (WWF, now WWE) and World Championship Wrestling (WCW) in 1999. For the WWF, she wrestled Tori in a losing effort on the August 8 episode of Sunday Night Heat. In WCW she wrestled Mona in a losing effort on the October 9 episode of WCW Saturday Night.

In 2001, Fyfe wrestled for New-Wave Championship Wrestling. She lost out to Bobcat for the vacant NWCW Women's Championship.

In 2005, Lexie joined Shimmer Women Athletes as a heel and defeated Christie Ricci on the promotion's first show. She later began teaming with Malia Hosaka after they attacked Lorelei Lee; following Lee's victory over Malia on Volume 3. On Volume 4 Hosaka and Fyfe defeated Lee and Cindy Rogers in a tag team match. On Volume 5 they became an official team under the name The Experience. Since then they had a winning streak which was broken by Cheerleader Melissa and MsChif on Volume 12. They then started another winning streak which was broken this time by Ashley Lane and Nevaeh in the final of a six-team Gauntlet Match on Volume 21.

After missing Volume 23 The Experience came back as part of the Volume 24 as they defeated the team of Rayna Von Tosh and Tenille.

On April 21, 2008, Lexie worked as a Hillary Clinton imposter on WWE Raw, where she defeated "Barack Obama" before being destroyed by Umaga.

In early 2010, Fyfe took a hiatus from professional wrestling due to her pregnancy and subsequent childbirth.

When Shine Wrestling was established on July 20, 2012, Lexie began her stint as a babyface authority figure for the promotion. On October 27, 2012, Fyfe made a return appearance to SHIMMER as a villain at Volume 50; taking part in a ten-woman elimination tag team match that saw her, Mercedes Martinez, Portia Perez, Nicole Matthews, and Saraya Knight defeated by MsChif, Allison Danger, Leva Bates, and Cheerleader Melissa.

== Championships and accomplishments ==
- In Your Face Wrestling
  - IYFW Women's Championship (1 time)
- National Wrestling Alliance
  - NWA World Women's Championship (1 time)
- North Atlantic Championship Wrestling
  - NACW Women's Championship (1 time)
- Professional Girl Wrestling Association
  - PGWA Women's Championship (1 time)
- Pro Wrestling Entertainment
  - PWE Women's Championship (1 time)
- Pro Wrestling Illustrated
  - Ranked No. 31 of the top 50 female wrestlers in the PWI Female 50 in 2008
- Southern Championship Wrestling
  - SCW Women's Championship (1 time)
- X Jam Wrestling
  - XJAM Women's Championship (1 time)
