= Sycamore Tavern =

Historic commercial building in Virginia, United States

- U.S. National Register of Historic Places
- U.S. Historic district – Contributing property
- Virginia Landmarks Register
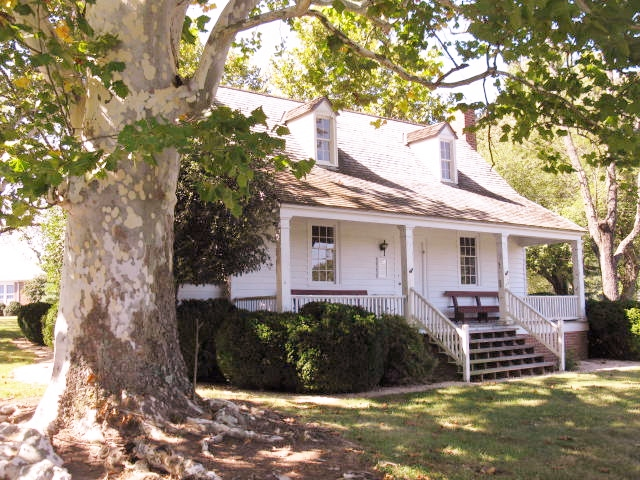

- Location within Virginia Location within the United States
- Location: W of U.S. 33, near Montpelier, Virginia
- Coordinates: 37°49′21″N 77°41′15″W
- Area: less than one acre
- NRHP reference No.: 74002124
- VLR No.: 042-0085

Significant dates
- Added to NRHP: July 24, 1974
- Designated VLR: August 15, 1972

Sycamore Tavern, also known as Shelburn's Tavern and Florence L. Page Memorial Library, is a historic inn and tavern located near Montpelier, Hanover County, Virginia. It was built before 1804, and is a 1 1/2-story, three bay by two bay, frame structure, with a rear shed extension. It is sheathed in weatherboard and has two exterior brick chimneys. An ordinary occupied the building through the 19th century. During the first quarter of the 20th century, Thomas Nelson Page, the noted Virginia author, founded a library in the structure in memory of his wife, Florence Lathrop Field Page.

It was listed on the National Register of Historic Places in 1974. It is located in the Montpelier Historic District.
