= Montpelier, Hanover County, Virginia =

Unincorporated community in Virginia, United States

- Unincorporated community
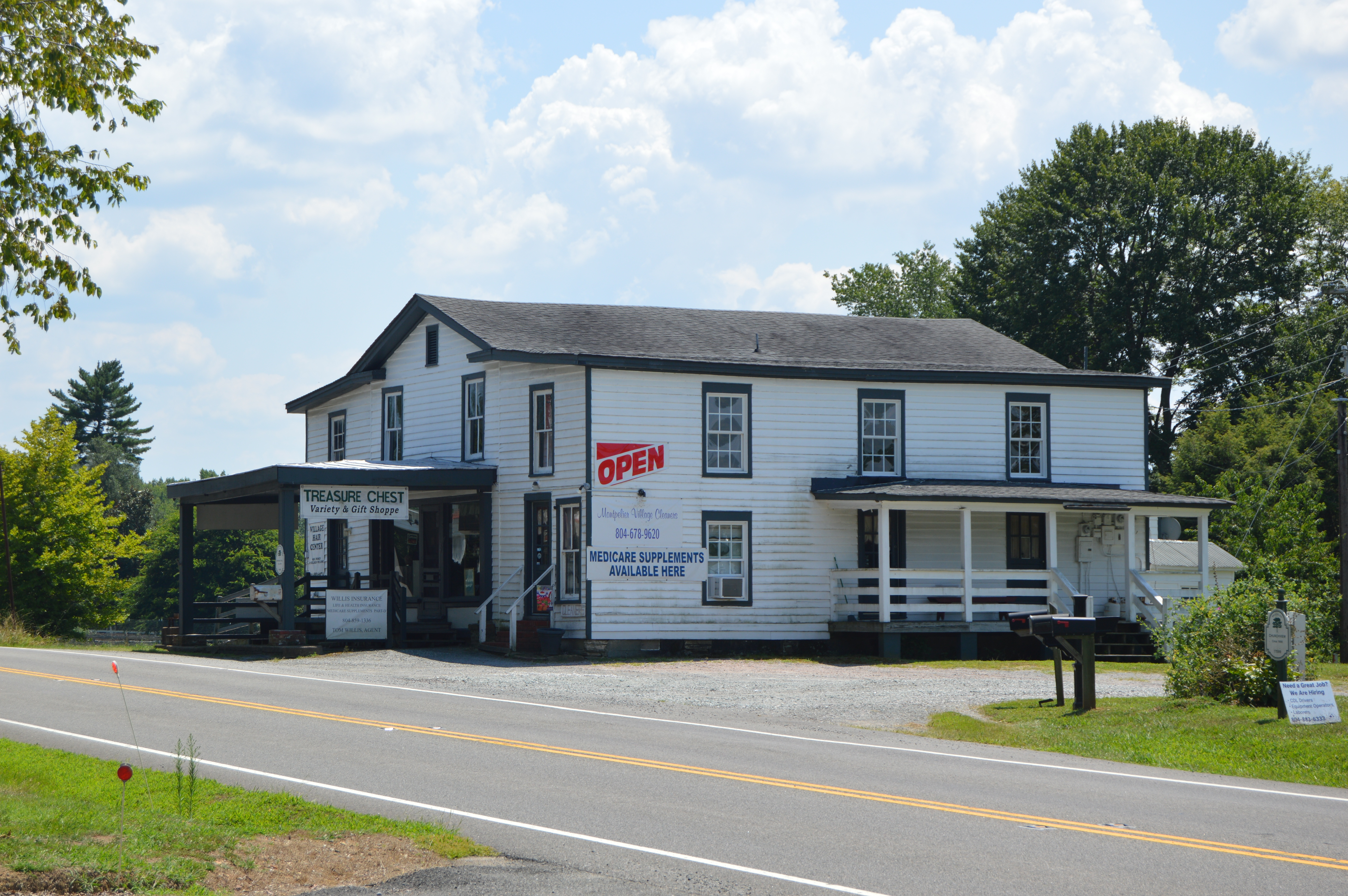
- Montpelier Historic District

- Location within Virginia Location within the United States
- Coordinates: 37°49′17″N 77°41′04″W
- Country: United States
- State: Virginia
- County: Hanover

Area
  - Total: 77 sq mi (199 km^{2})
  - Land: 76 sq mi (197 km^{2})
  - Water: 1.2 sq mi (3 km^{2})
- Elevation: 335 ft (102 m)

Population (2010)
  - Total: 7,067
  - Density: 93/sq mi (36/km^{2})
- Time zone: UTC-5 (Eastern (EST))
  - Summer (DST): UTC-4 (EDT)
- ZIP code: 23192
- Area code: 804
- GNIS feature ID: 1495961

Montpelier is an unincorporated community in Hanover County in the central region of the U.S. state of Virginia. Montpelier is on U.S. Route 33, which was long named as "the Mountain Road" between Richmond and the Blue Ridge Mountains. The community is located midway between Richmond and President James Madison's home "Montpelier", and may have been named for the famous estate, which is a tourist attraction.

Formerly consisting primarily of farmland and a small business district, today Montpelier is a hub for locals and serves as a bedroom community for many residents who commute to jobs in large metropolitan areas such as Richmond. Professional wrestler Mickie James grew up in Montpelier.

The Montpelier Historic District, Oakland, and Sycamore Tavern are listed on the National Register of Historic Places.
