= Mickie James =

American professional wrestler and country singer (born 1979)

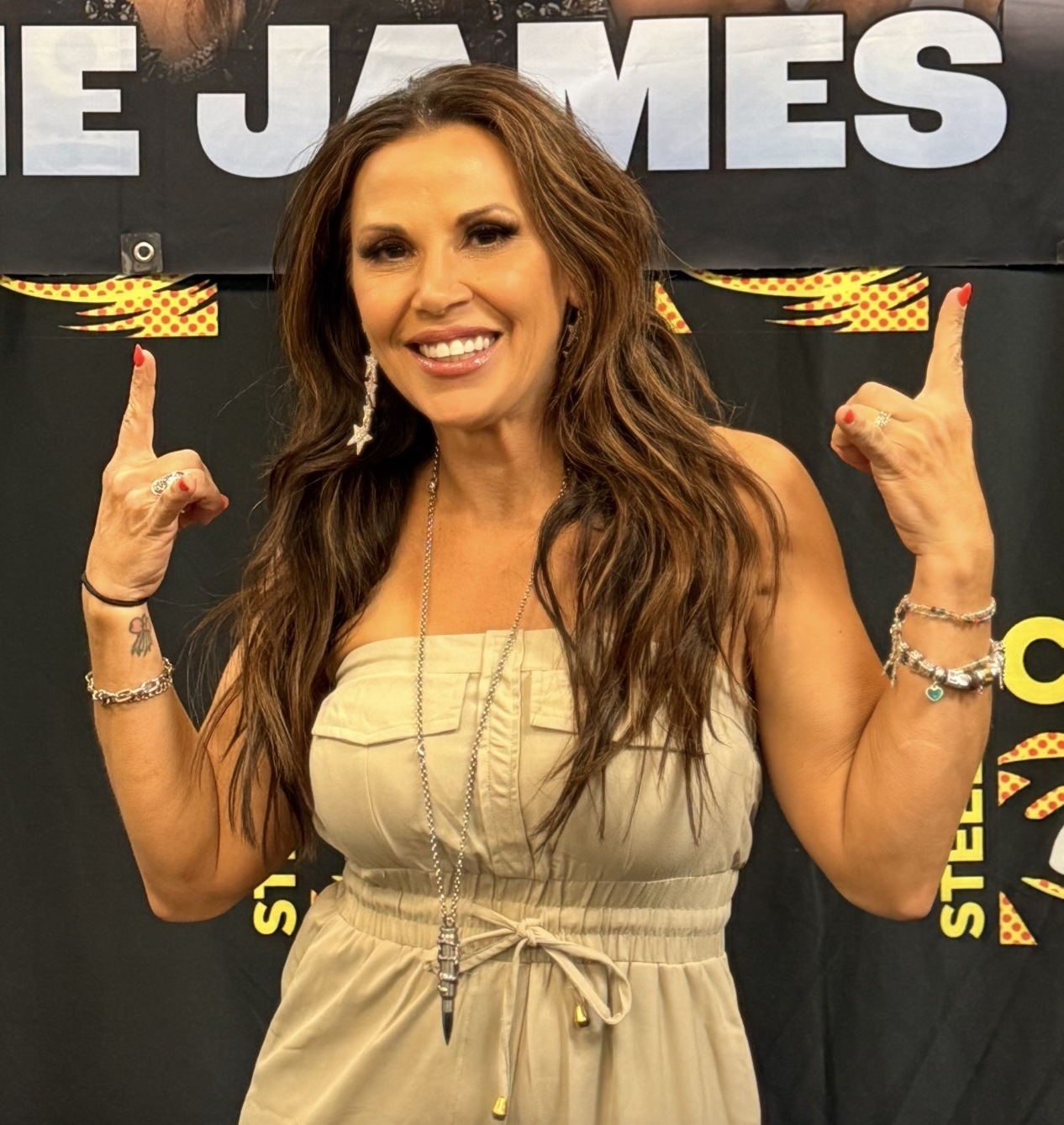
- James at Steel City Comic Con 2026

Personal information
- Born: Mickie Laree James; August 31, 1979 (age 47) Richmond, Virginia, U.S.
- Spouse: Nick Aldis (m. 2015)
- Children: 1
- Website: mickiejames.com

Professional wrestling career
- Ring name(s): Alexis Laree; Mickie James; Princess Alexis; La Luchadora
- Billed height: 5 ft 4 in (163 cm)
- Billed weight: 124 lb (56 kg)
- Billed from: Richmond, Virginia; Norfolk, Virginia
- Trained by: Funking Conservatory; KYDA Pro Training School
- Debut: August 28, 1999
- Musical career
- Genre: Country
- Instrument: Vocals
- Years active: 2010–present
- Labels: Entertainment One (2013–2016); Sony (2016–present)

Mickie Laree James (born August 31, 1979) is an American professional wrestler and country singer. She is signed to WWE, as an ambassador. She is also known for her tenures in Total Nonstop Action Wrestling (TNA) where she was inducted into the Hall of Fame in 2025 and National Wrestling Alliance (NWA).

James began her wrestling career in 1999 as a valet on the independent circuit, where she was known under the name Alexis Laree. She trained in several camps to improve her wrestling abilities before working for NWA: Total Nonstop Action in 2002, where she gained national attention. After only a few appearances, she joined a stable called The Gathering and was written into storylines with the group. She until 2025 was the only woman to be involved in the promotion's Clockwork Orange House of Fun matches.

James made her World Wrestling Entertainment (WWE) main roster debut in 2005 and was placed in a storyline with Trish Stratus, in which James' gimmick was that of Stratus' biggest fan turned obsessed stalker, an angle which ran over eight months. She received a push and she won her first WWE Women's Championship at WrestleMania 22, a championship she has held a total of five times. James also won her first and only Divas Championship defeating Maryse Ouellet at Night of Champions in 2009, to become the second of five Divas to hold both the Women's and Divas Championships. She was released from the company in April 2010, after which she returned to TNA, where she became a three-time TNA Knockouts Champion. James returned to WWE in 2013 as a guest trainer, then officially returned in 2016 before she was once again released in 2021. James would then make occasional appearances and would ultimately return to Impact Wrestling in 2021, winning her fourth and fifth Knockouts Championship, making James a total 11-time women's world champion between WWE and Impact.

== Early life ==
James was born at Richmond Memorial Hospital in Richmond, Virginia, the daughter of Stuart James, a retired wastewater-treatment worker, landscaper, and VAIL League Division 3 Championship coach and Sandra Knuckles, a teacher and real-estate agent. Her parents divorced while she was young. She has a sister, a half-sister, a half-brother, and three stepbrothers. She grew up in Montpelier, Virginia, and graduated from Patrick Henry High School in 1997. While growing up, she spent a lot of time on her grandmother's horse farm, and developed a keen interest in equestrian sports. She played violin for five years.

== Professional wrestling career ==
=== Early career (1999–2003) ===
A fan of professional wrestling from an early age, James attended a professional wrestling school in the Washington, D.C., area at the suggestion of a friend. She made her professional debut on the independent circuit on 28 August 1999, as a wrestler for KYDA Pro Wrestling under the ring name Alexis Laree, a name created as the result of a combination of her stage name from when she was a dancer and her middle name. Laree went on to manage several male wrestlers, including managing Tommy Dreamer to win the KYDA Pro Heavyweight Championship. In March, she wrestled in her first match, an intergender tag team match with Jake Damian against American Mike Brown and Candie. She trained to improve her wrestling abilities by attending training camps such as the Funking Conservatory, a workshop run by Dory Funk Jr., and an Extreme Championship Wrestling (ECW) dojo. She also started competing for Maryland Championship Wrestling (MCW), where she trained at camps run by Ricky Morton and Bobby Eaton. Beginning in 2002, she also made appearances for Ring of Honor.

Due to the low salary of the independent shows, James supplemented her income by working as a waitress at an Olive Garden restaurant, and posing nude for adult fetish magazines Leg Show and Naughty Neighbors in the early 2000s, before gaining fame and being subsequently signed by World Wrestling Entertainment in 2003.

=== Total Nonstop Action Wrestling (2002–2003) ===
While working in Ring of Honor for a year, James also debuted as Alexis Laree in Total Nonstop Action Wrestling (TNA) on the company's first ever weekly pay-per-view, introduced as a participant in the lingerie battle royal, which occurred the following week. She was not prominently featured until March 26, 2003, when she teamed with Amazing Red as part of his feud against the X Division Champion Kid Kash and Trinity. Laree competed in her first singles match with the promotion on April 2, 2003, in a losing effort against Trinity. Weeks later, she became the first member of The Gathering, a stable led by Raven in his feud against NWA World Heavyweight Champion Jeff Jarrett. On April 16, Laree became the first (and thus far, only) woman to compete in a Clockwork Orange House of Fun match, after the Gathering challenged and defeated Jarrett. She continued to wrestle with the stable while they feuded with The Disciples of the New Church, taking part in an angle with Father James Mitchell burning her with a fireball and wrestling in another Clockwork Orange House of Fun match before leaving the company.

=== World Wrestling Entertainment (2003–2010, 2013) ===
==== Ohio Valley Wrestling (2003–2005) ====
After two years of sending tapes and making phone calls as well as wrestling a tryout dark match with Dawn Marie, James was signed to a developmental contract with World Wrestling Entertainment (WWE), who sent her to train at Ohio Valley Wrestling (OVW), their then-developmental territory, in August 2003. Still using the ring name Alexis Laree, she began making television appearances for OVW on January 29, 2004, and competed in several tag team matches throughout the year. She also won a Halloween costume contest on October 30, and defeated Jillian Hall in a $1,000 match on November 12.

On May 17, 2005, Laree was placed into a tournament for the OVW Television Championship. She defeated Mike Mondo in the first round, only to lose to Blaster Lashley in the next round. She began a feud with Beth Phoenix on July 20 after Phoenix interrupted Laree during an interview, setting up a match on July 29, which Laree lost. Their angle continued into September, with Shelly Martinez being added to the storyline to side with Phoenix against Laree. On October 12, she appeared in OVW under her real name, and finished the year on the losing end of matches against Martinez and Jillian Hall.

==== Storyline with Trish Stratus (2005–2006) ====
Under her real name, she debuted in WWE on the October 10, 2005, episode of Raw as a face under the gimmick of WWE Women's Champion Trish Stratus' biggest fan. The angle had the two Divas competing together in tag team matches, with James' character becoming increasingly obsessed with Stratus. The storyline included a Halloween costume contest, in which James was dressed like Stratus and helped Stratus retain the Women's Championship in a Fulfill Your Fantasy battle royal at Taboo Tuesday by eliminating herself and Victoria at the same time. James even began utilizing Stratus' signature finishing moves as her own during matches. James later became the number one contender for the WWE Women's Championship on December 12, by defeating Victoria in a match to determine who would face Stratus at New Year's Revolution. Subsequently, the storyline between Mickie and Stratus developed into a lesbian angle, after James kissed Stratus under a sprig of mistletoe. In the championship match at the pay-per-view, James lost to Stratus.

Despite the defeat, James continued to be enamored of Stratus, which made Stratus uncomfortable. On March 6, 2006, the storyline had Stratus confronting James, telling her that they needed time apart from each other. Through the early part of 2006, Mickie would attack Ashley Massaro several times due to Massaro calling her "crazy". At the Royal Rumble pay-per-view, James defeated Massaro with then-Women's Champion, Trish Stratus, as the special guest referee. James would also confess her love for Stratus at the event. Massaro got revenge one week later on Raw.

James and Stratus teamed together at the March 18, 2006 Saturday Night's Main Event XXXII to defeat Candice Michelle and Victoria. After the match, James agreed to honor Stratus' wishes and attempted to kiss her. After Stratus pushed her away, James attacked Stratus and vowed to destroy her. The feud between James and Stratus culminated in a Women's Championship match at WrestleMania 22, which James won, to earn her first Women's Championship in what was looked at as one of the best female matches ever produced at WrestleMania. Her angle with Stratus continued into Backlash during a rematch, after Stratus legitimately dislocated her shoulder when James threw her out of the ring. The feud would come to an end on the June 26 episode of Raw, when Mickie defeated Stratus in a Women's Championship match.

==== Women's Champion (2006–2008) ====
James dropped the WWE Women's Championship on August 14 to Lita, after Lita hit James with the title belt. After the Women's Championship was vacated due to the retirement of Trish Stratus, James entered a tournament to determine the new champion. She defeated Victoria and Melina en route to the finals at Cyber Sunday, where she lost to Lita. James transitioned into a face after she and Lita wrestled in a series of matches in which Lita chose stipulations to hinder Mickie's wrestling ability. The feud between James and Lita ended at Survivor Series, where James defeated Lita, in the latter's retirement match, to win her second Women's Championship.

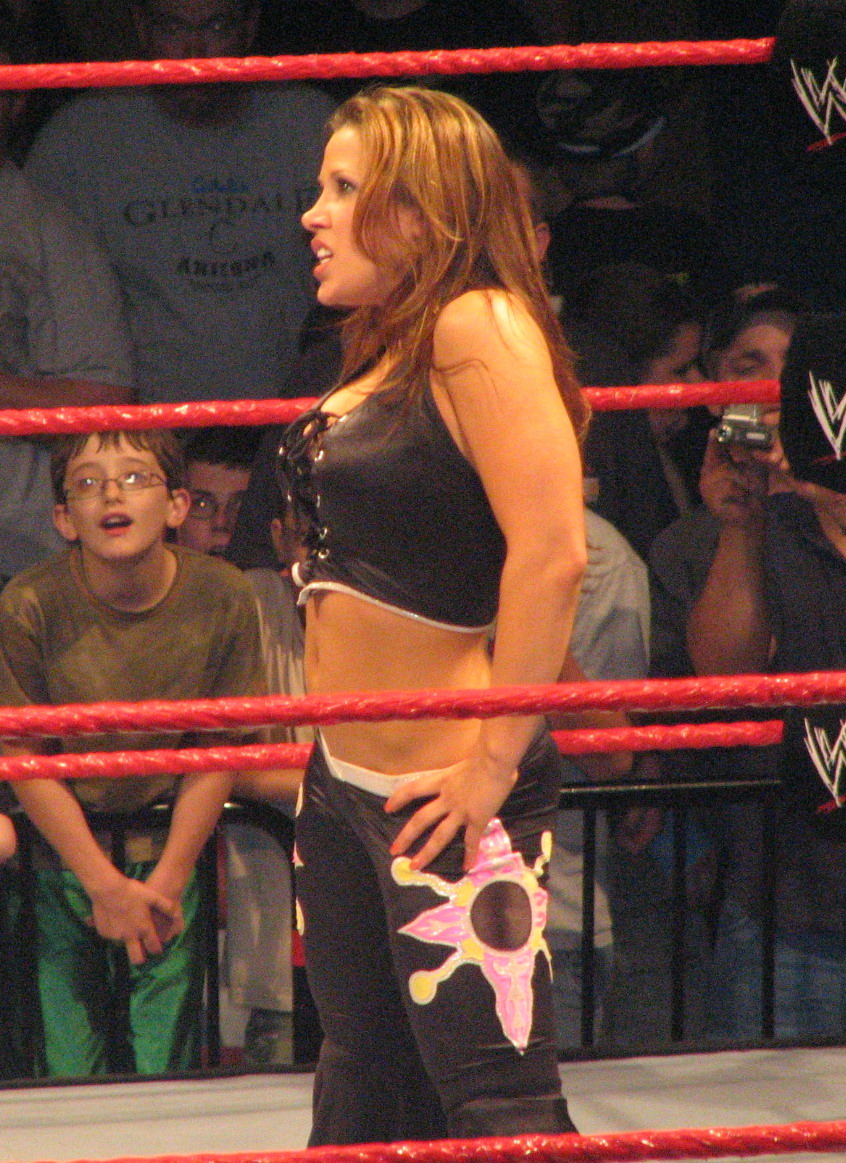
James during a WWE house show in 2007

James then began an angle with Melina on January 29, 2007, when Melina became the number one contender for the Women's Championship. Following a successful title defense on February 5, James teamed with Super Crazy in a mixed tag team match against Melina and Johnny Nitro. After Melina pinned James for the victory, she challenged her to a rematch for the title. James would subsequently lose the Women's Championship to Melina on February 19 and, in continuation of their storyline feud, failed to regain the title during the first women's Falls Count Anywhere match in WWE history. During the finish of the match, James fell from the top turnbuckle and landed on her neck, which resulted in a rushed finish. James, however, was not seriously injured in the incident.

The scripted feud between James and Melina was rekindled during her photo op on Raw. At a house show in Paris on April 24, James won her third Women's Championship during a triple threat match that also involved Victoria. Since Mickie pinned Victoria and not Melina, an immediate rematch was scheduled, in which James dropped the title back to Melina, giving her the shortest Women's Championship reign in WWE history. James later received a rematch for the title at Backlash, but was unsuccessful. After Backlash, James would only make sporadic appearances on television, wrestling occasionally in tag-matches and rarely in singles competition. On the November 26 episode of Raw, James defeated Melina in a number one contender's match for Beth Phoenix's Women's Championship, setting up a title match between the two at Armageddon, in which Phoenix retained the title.

On the April 14, 2008, episode of Raw, held in London, England, James defeated Beth Phoenix to win her fourth Women's Championship. At Judgment Day, James successfully defended her title against Melina and Beth Phoenix in a triple-threat match. Mickie re-entered the feud against Phoenix in mid-2008, where she and Kofi Kingston teamed up against Phoenix and Santino Marella at SummerSlam in a Winner Takes All tag team match for both the Women's and Intercontinental Championships, in which Mickie and Kingston lost their titles to Phoenix and Marella. After James lost the championship, she had two rematches for the title, but was unsuccessful in regaining it. At Survivor Series in November, James was part of the victorious Raw Diva team which defeated the SmackDown Divas in a five-on-five elimination match; she eliminated Michelle McCool, before being eliminated by Maryse. The following month at Armageddon, James teamed with Maria, Michelle McCool and Kelly Kelly in a winning effort against Jillian Hall, Maryse, Victoria and Natalya.

==== Divas and Women's Champion and departure (2009–2010) ====
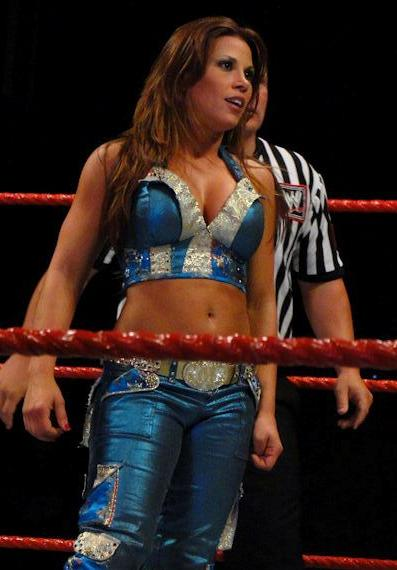
James in June 2009

Following an appearance in the 25-Diva battle royal at WrestleMania XXV, James began feuding with the WWE Divas Champion Maryse heading into Night of Champions on July 26. At the event, James defeated Maryse to win her first Divas Championship, becoming only the second Diva in history to have held both the Women's and Divas titles. Throughout the Summer, Mickie successfully defended the title against Gail Kim and Beth Phoenix on episodes of Raw, and against Alicia Fox at the Hell in a Cell pay-per-view on October 4. Two weeks later on Raw, James lost the title to Jillian Hall after an approximate three month title reign. After the show, James was traded to the SmackDown brand for the first time in her career, due to a Diva trade made by Raw guest host Nancy O'Dell.

James made her debut with the brand on the October 23 episode of SmackDown, defeating Layla. On the October 30 episode of SmackDown, a controversial angle began that saw WWE Women's Champion Michelle McCool and Layla, collectively known as LayCool, bully James. On the November 20 episode of SmackDown, after James defeated Layla, McCool gave James the nickname "Piggy James", that sent James to tears, resulting in a five-on-five Survivor Series match at the November pay-per-view Survivor Series, where James' team prevailed over McCool's team, with James and Melina as the sole survivors. On the December 4 episode of SmackDown, James became the number one contender for McCool's Women's Championship by defeating Beth Phoenix and Natalya in a triple threat match. The following week, James challenged McCool for the championship at TLC: Tables, Ladders & Chairs, but was unsuccessful after interference from Layla. On the January 22 edition of Smackdown, another controversial segment in the feud took place when Laycool beatdown James, force-fed her a pig shaped cake and dumped a bowl of punch on her head, leaving her sobbing and defeated in the ring. The storyline feud continued into the Royal Rumble on January 31, 2010, where James finally defeated McCool in 20 seconds to become a five-time Women's Champion, the second most reigns with the old WWE Women's Championship after Trish Stratus, who has had 7 reigns. Over the following couple of weeks, SmackDown consultant Vickie Guerrero was introduced into the rivalry, choosing to side with LayCool over James. On the February 26 episode of SmackDown, McCool used her rematch clause to face James for the Women's Championship, with Guerrero acting as special guest referee. After Guerrero slapped James, McCool pinned her to regain the title.

On March, James was diagnosed with a staph infection on her right knee, putting her out of action for three weeks. She returned on the March 22 episode of Raw, where alongside Kelly Kelly, she accompanied Eve Torres, Beth Phoenix, and Gail Kim in their losing effort against McCool, Maryse and Layla, who had Vickie Guerrero and Alicia Fox in their corner. This set up a 10-Diva tag team match at WrestleMania XXVI, in which James made an unsuccessful in-ring return after Vickie pinned Kelly. James made her last appearance on Raw during a rematch, where her team was victorious. James' final match in WWE aired on the April 23 episode of SmackDown where she teamed with former long-time rival Beth Phoenix against LayCool in a losing effort when she was pinned by Layla. James was released from WWE one day earlier on April 22, having pre-taped her SmackDown match. According to James, WWE explained the decision as due to desiring to "move in a new direction with their women's division".

Sporadic appearances (2013)

In November 2013, James served as guest trainer at the WWE Performance Center in Orlando, Florida, for a week, training NXT's female wrestlers. James also attended that week's NXT live event in Tampa, Florida.

=== Return to the independent circuit (2010–2016) ===
James made her return to the independent circuit in April 2010, as part of World Wrestling Council (WWC), teaming with Carlito to defeat the team of ODB and Christopher Daniels. James won the bout after pinning Daniels. On July 11, as part of their Anniversary weekend, she defeated ODB in a singles match. On the last day of that month, James returned to one of her early promotions, Maryland Championship Wrestling (MCW), to wrestle Mia Yim in a winning effort. The following month, she contested for the Women Superstars Uncensored (WSU) Championship against Mercedes Martinez, but she was unsuccessful. She also returned to Dory Funk's promotion, recording a tag team match for !Bang! TV. James also accompanied Dory Funk Jr. during his match, and sung "The Star-Spangled Banner" during !Bang! TV's tribute to the troops. On September 18, James served as a special guest referee for a three-way match between ODB, Persephone and Kristin Flake for the SCWA Ladies' Title during Southern California Wrestling Association's (SCWA) 'CAGED event in Wentworth, North Carolina, where all matches took place in a cage.

In early 2011, James began appearing for Covey Promotions. At All or Nothing 5 on April 30, James defeated Hannah Blossom to become the first Covey Pro Women's Champion. During her time with TNA, James made several appearances for independent wrestling promotions such as Pro Championship Wrestling, Legends of the Ring, Northeast Wrestling and National Wrestling Superstars. On November 11, 2011, James lost the Covey Pro Women's Championship to the debuting Jessie Belle Smothers.

James made her debut for Pro Wrestling Elite (PWE) in Ayr, Scotland on September 15, 2012, at History Is Born, where she wrestled Kay Lee Ray to a no contest. After the match, James teamed up with Ray in a winning effort against Carmel and Nikki Storm. The following night, James competed against Carmel in a winning effort. James returned to Pro Wrestling Elite at their second anniversary event Elite Bro on July 20, 2013, in a winning effort against Nikki Storm. On September 21, James made an appearance at the Wrestling Spectacular 2 all-female event in Edison, New Jersey, alongside many former WWE and TNA female wrestlers, such as Angelina Love, Katarina Waters, Rosita and Brooke Adams. James and Love fought in the main event, with Candice Michelle as the special guest referee, where Love pinned James after interference from Velvet Sky. James made appearances for Big Time Wrestling in August 2013, doing so as a villainess wrestling Reby Sky several times in different dates and locations, winning in all bouts against Sky. On October 12, Mickie again appeared for the promotion, beating Quebec's Midianne in Bristol, Connecticut. On February 8, 2014, James returned to Maryland Championship Wrestling for the Anniversary 2014 event in Joppa, Maryland, to face Angelina Love, promoted as "Battle of the Bombshells". Although originally promoted as a singles match, interference by MCW's Renee Michelles' and Jessie Kayes' rivalry occurred during the match, resulting in the match being turned into a tag team match with Mickie and Michelle facing Angelina and Kayes, which James and Michelle won.

On April 25, 2014, at the Berkeley Springs High School theater in West Virginia, James headlined the Covey Promotion 3rd Annual Hall Of Fame Induction Ceremony, as she was inducted into the Covey Pro Hall Of Hame Class of 2014. The next day, during the All or Nothing 8! event which was aired on May 17 as the 154th episode of Covey Pro TV, James was interrupted during an interview by Amber Rodriguez, who mocked James on her legitimate pregnancy and gave her a pie as a tease, and in return, James shoved the pie in Amber's face. Jessie Belle Smothers came to the rescue and battled Rodriguez as James was escorted out by security. Two months after giving birth to her child, James returned to in-ring competition at Queens Of Combat 3 on November 30, where she defeated Tessa Blanchard after turning heel during the match and resorting to villainous tactics. On May 16, James debuted for First State Championship Wrestling (1CW) unsuccessfully challenging Kacee Carlisle for the 1CW Women's Championship after getting herself disqualified.

On June 19, 2015, at Maryland Championship Wrestling's Ladies Night event, James defeated Amber Rodriguez (with Lisa Marie Varon as the special guest referee and Melina as the enforcer) to win the MCW Women's Championship, despite being attacked by the villainous Melina during the match. On November 13, Kimber Lee defeated James to win the MCW Women's Championship after interference from Amber Rodriguez. The following night, James gained a measure of revenge by defeating Rodriguez in a Loser Leaves MCW match, causing Rodriguez to leave the company. On February 2, 2016, James made an appearance for Chikara in a losing effort against Grand Champion Princess Kimber Lee. On April 1, 2016, James returned to Queens of Combat and defeated LuFisto at Queens of Combat 10.

On September 2, 2016, James made her debut for Chikara, when she entered the 2016 King of Trios tournament as part of Team Original Divas Revolution, alongside Jazz and Victoria. They defeated Team Shimmer (Candice LeRae, Crazy Mary Dobson and Solo Darling) in their first round match. The following day, Team Original Divas Revolution was eliminated from the tournament by The Warriors Three (Oleg the Usurper, Princess KimberLee and ThunderFrog).

James worked as head trainer for the Virginia based promotion Ground Xero Wrestling (GXW) Training Academy. She trained students at the Richmond location. James beat Renee Michelle for the GXW Women's Championship while with the promotion.

=== Return to TNA (2010–2015) ===
==== Feud with Madison Rayne (2010–2011) ====
On September 22, 2010, it was reported that James had signed a contract with Total Nonstop Action Wrestling (TNA). James returned to the promotion on October 7's Before The Glory special episode of Impact!, when she was introduced as the special guest referee for the TNA Knockouts Championship match between Angelina Love, Velvet Sky, Madison Rayne and Tara at Bound for Glory. At the pay-per-view, James counted the pinfall which made Tara the new Knockouts Champion, prompting Rayne to shove James amidst an argument with Tara, and James replying with a punch. On the following episode of Impact!, Tara lost the title to Rayne, while James made her intentions for the Knockouts title clear, after a confrontation with the new champion. James wrestled her return match the following week, defeating Sarita, before being attacked by Rayne's ally, Tara. James wrestled her first TNA pay-per-view match at Turning Point, where she battled Tara to a double disqualification.

On the November 18 episode of Impact! James defeated Angelina Love to become the number one contender to the championship. At Final Resolution, James was defeated by Tara in a Falls Count Anywhere match, following interference from Madison Rayne after she sprayed a fire extinguisher and hit James with the Knockouts title belt. On the following episode of Impact!, James defeated Tara in a steel cage match. On January 9, 2011, at Genesis, James lost her match against Rayne for the Knockouts Championship due to interference from Tara. The following month at Against All Odds, James once again failed to win the Knockouts Championship, this time losing to Rayne in a Last Knockout Standing match, after another interference by Tara. On the March 17 episode of Impact!, Rayne agreed to give James another title match at Lockdown, with the added stipulation that should James fail to win the title, she would have to shave her hair off. On March 18, James legitimately separated her shoulder at a TNA house show in Jacksonville, Florida. James's injury was put into a storyline, where it was caused by Rayne and Tara running over her with Tara's motorcycle.

==== Knockouts Championship reigns (2011–2013) ====
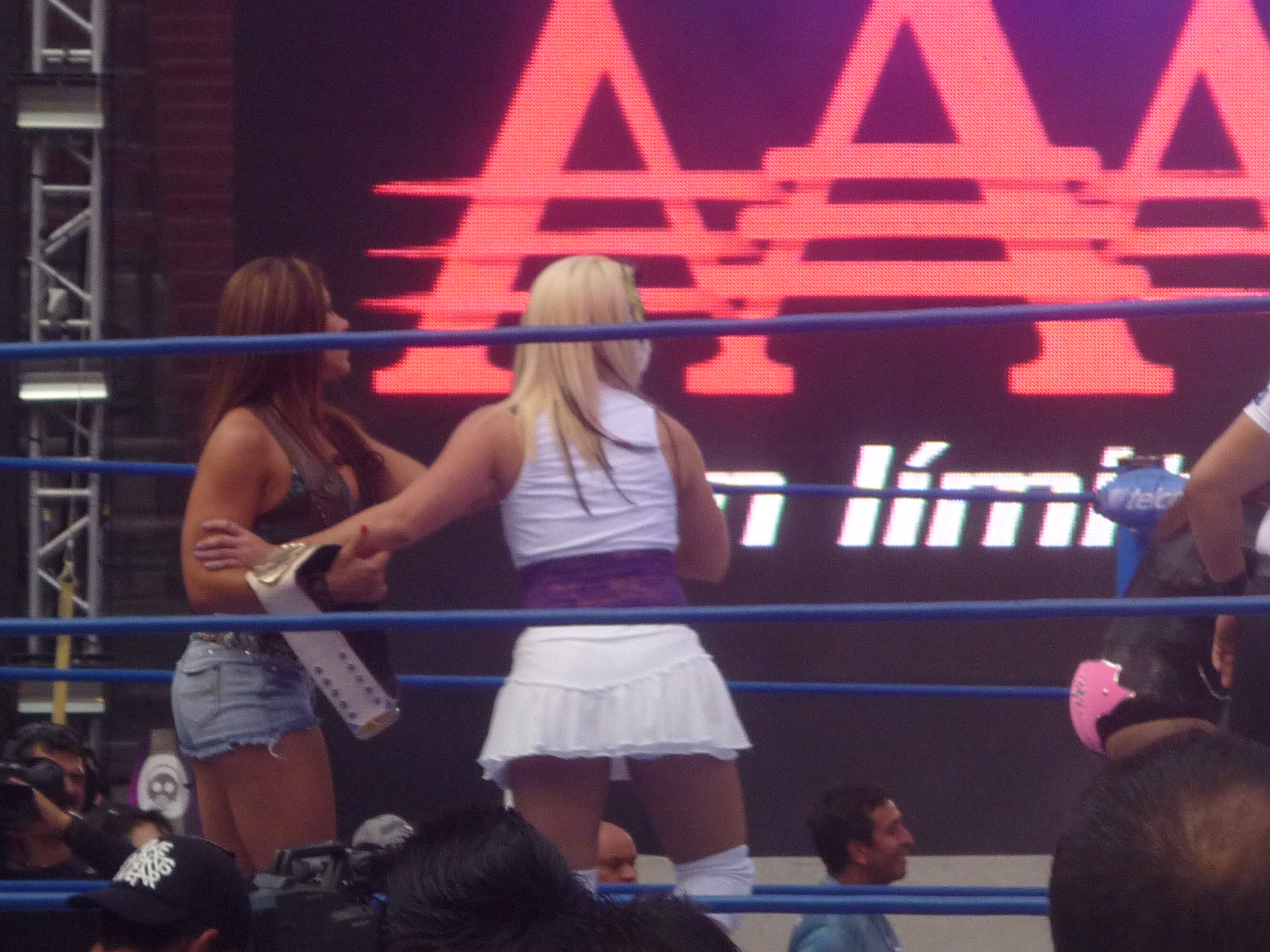
James (left) and Sexy Star (right) at the 2011 Verano de Escándalo event

On April 17, James defeated Madison Rayne in a steel cage match, which lasted less than a minute, to win the TNA Knockouts Championship for the first time. With the win, James became the first woman in history to have held the WWE Women's Championship, the WWE Divas Championship, and the TNA Knockouts Championship. On the May 5 episode of Impact!, James made her first successful title defense against Ms. Tessmacher. On May 15 at Sacrifice, James successfully defended her title against Madison Rayne and helped Tara get a release from her alliance with Rayne. The following month at Slammiversary IX, James successfully defended her title against Angelina Love, however after the match both Love and Winter attacked her. On June 18, James made her debut for TNA's Mexican partner Lucha Libre AAA Worldwide (AAA) at Triplemanía XIX, where she teamed with Angelina Love, Sexy Star and Velvet Sky to defeat Cynthia Moreno, Faby Apache, Lolita and Mari Apache in an eight-woman tag team match. James returned to AAA on July 9, teaming with Sexy Star to defeat the Apaches in a tag team match, after which she challenged Mari to a match for her AAA Reina de Reinas Championship. On July 31 at Verano de Escándalo, James competed in an eight-way match for the Reina de Reinas Championship, becoming the last person eliminated by the new champion, Pimpinela Escarlata. On the June 23 episode of Impact Wrestling, James was defeated by Winter in a non-title Street Fight, following outside interference from Love. This led to a match on August 7 at Hardcore Justice, where James lost the Knockouts Championship to Winter, following multiple interferences from Love and a red mist from Winter. On the following episode of Impact Wrestling, James defeated Madison Rayne to earn a rematch for the title. On the September 1 episode of Impact Wrestling, James defeated Winter to win her second TNA Knockouts Championship. On September 11 at No Surrender, James dropped the title back to Winter. On the September 22 episode of Impact Wrestling, James defeated Ms. Tessmacher to earn another shot at the championship at Bound for Glory, in a four-way match with defending champion Winter, Madison Rayne and Velvet Sky, which Sky would win.

On the November 17 episode of Impact Wrestling, James defeated nine other Knockouts in a gauntlet match to earn a championship match with the new champion, Gail Kim. On December 11 at Final Resolution, Gail defeated James to retain the championship, following a distraction from Madison Rayne. In the main event of the December 29 episode of Impact Wrestling, James challenged Kim for the championship, but was defeated following interference from Rayne. On the January 5, 2012, episode of Impact Wrestling, James and Traci Brooks failed to capture the TNA Knockouts Tag Team Championship from Kim and Rayne. Three days later at Genesis, James lost another championship match against Kim, after being disqualified for using the brass knuckles that were thrown into the ring by Rayne, who was locked in a cage suspended in the air during the match. On the January 19 episode of Impact Wrestling, James defeated Rayne in a steel cage match. On the January 26 episode of Impact Wrestling, James and Velvet Sky were defeated by Tara in a three-way number one contender's match for the Knockouts Championship. On the April 5 episode of Impact Wrestling, James was defeated by Sky in a six-way number one contenders match, also involving Angelina Love, Madison Rayne, Tara, and Winter. On the June 7 episode of Impact Wrestling, James again failed to earn a shot at the Knockouts Championship when she was defeated by Ms. Tessmacher in a four-way match that also included Tara and Velvet Sky, while also showing signs of a heel turn due to jealousy of Sky. On the June 21 episode of Impact Wrestling, James was chosen over Sky as the next challenger for the Knockouts Championship, but failed to recapture the title from Ms. Tessmacher. James' storyline with Sky ended abruptly the following month, when Sky was granted her release from TNA. On the August 2 episode of Impact Wrestling, James unsuccessfully competed in a four-way number one contenders match involving Gail Kim, Tara and the eventual winner Madison Rayne. After a three-month absence, James returned on the November 15 episode of Impact Wrestling, winning a Knockouts battle royal to become the number one contender to the Knockouts Championship. On December 9 at Final Resolution, James was unsuccessful in winning the championship from Tara after a distraction from her boyfriend Jesse. James received another shot at the championship on the December 20 episode of Impact Wrestling, but was again defeated by Tara. On January 13, 2013, at the Genesis pay-per-view, James competed in a five-woman gauntlet match to determine the number one contender to the Knockout Championship, but was eliminated by Gail Kim.

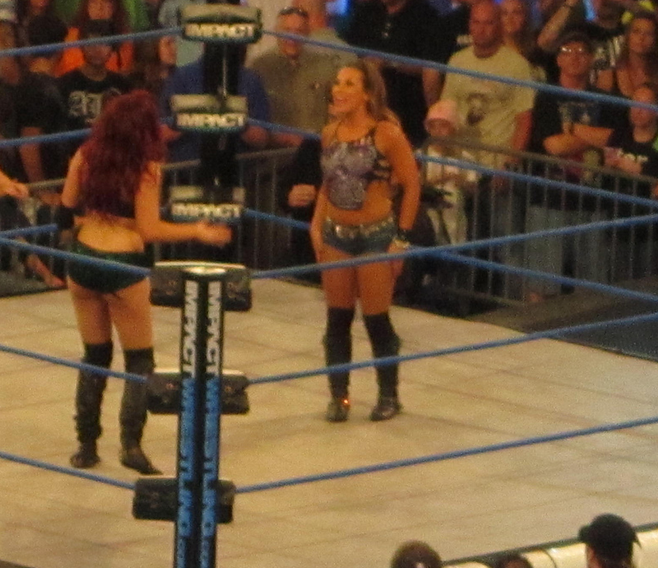
James (right) prior to face Taeler Hendrix during a TNA event in 2013

On the April 18 of Impact Wrestling, James defeated Ms. Tessmacher to become the number one contender to the Knockouts Championship. James began turning heel during her title match against defending champion Velvet Sky on the following week, when she targeted Sky's injured knee; James was defeated Sky. On the May 23 episode of Impact Wrestling, James defeated Sky after attacking her injured knee to become a three-time Knockouts Champion. The following week, James continued portraying a villainous persona by calling out Velvet Sky, acting sarcastic and pompous towards her, and also did not help Sky when she was attacked by Gail Kim. James cemented her heel turn on the June 13 episode of Impact Wrestling, when she attacked Sky when the latter said that she was ready for a rematch. James and Sky had their rematch on the June 27 episode of Impact Wrestling, where James retained her championship. On the July 4 episode of Impact Wrestling, James justified her actions by claiming that getting to the top of the Knockouts division requires "clawing and scratching your way to the top"; James also claimed that "no woman would ever be as great as her" and she'll "stand atop the division as the greatest Knockouts Champion of all time". On the July 25 episode of Impact Wrestling, James successfully defended the championship against Gail Kim. At the September 6 airing of Knockout Knockdown, James defeated Serena Deeb to qualify for the gauntlet battle royal finals, in which James was lastly eliminated by Gail Kim. James lost the Knockouts Championship on the September 19 episode of Impact Wrestling to ODB. Four days later, it was revealed that James had failed to come to terms on a contract renewal with TNA. James later stated in an interview that she technically wasn't under contract with TNA, but she did not confirm that she was gone. On November 15, 2013, James appeared in an interview on WWE.com, discussing her history with WWE and the possibility of making a return to the company. At the December 6 airing of World Cup of Wrestling, James was a member of Team USA, along with James Storm, Christopher Daniels, Kazarian and Kenny King. James was defeated by Team Aces & Eights' Ivelisse Vélez following interference from the other members of Aces & Eights. Team USA would go on to defeat Team Aces & Eights in a 5-on-5 elimination tag team match, in which James gained a measure of retribution by eliminating Vélez during the match; James and Storm were presented with the trophy afterward.

=== Second return to TNA (2015) ===
James made a surprise return to TNA as a fan favorite, after a year and a half absence from the company, on January 30, 2015, during the tapings of Impact Wrestling in Glasgow, Scotland. James would then have several confrontations with Bram over his actions towards her real life fiancé, Magnus. On the April 24 episode of Impact Wrestling, James retired from wrestling to focus on becoming a full-time mother, but James Storm talked her into having one more match. On the June 3 episode of Impact Wrestling, James declined an offer by Storm to join The Revolution, which resulted in him intentionally shoving her onto a train track in the storyline, which sparked controversy. This was done to write off James from television, as she had no more dates set with the company at the time. James made her return on the July 1 episode of Impact Wrestling, confronting Storm and challenging him to an intergender tag team match. After the match, James got revenge on Storm and she delivered a jumping DDT on him. On the July 29 episode of Impact Wrestling, James and Magnus defeated Storm and his partner Serena, when James pinned Serena.

=== Global Force Wrestling (2015–2016) ===
On July 7, 2015, James signed with Global Force Wrestling (GFW). On July 24, at GFW's inaugural tapings in Las Vegas, Nevada, James lost a three-way GFW Women's Championship tournament qualifying match that also included Lei'D Tapa and the ultimate winner, Christina Von Eerie. On January 22, Christina Von Eerie defeated James and Kimber Lee to retain the GFW Women's Championship.

=== Return to WWE (2016–2021) ===
==== Alliance and feud with Alexa Bliss (2016–2019) ====
On October 13, 2016, it was announced that James would return to WWE's developmental brand NXT at the NXT TakeOver: Toronto event on November 19, competing against Asuka for the NXT Women's Championship. On the October 26 episode of NXT, James cut a promo where she formally re–introduced herself and challenged Asuka for the championship. At the event, James was defeated and after the match Asuka refused to shake her hand as a sign of disrespect. On December 8, it was announced that James had signed a multi–year contract with WWE. According to James, she asked to return under her previous character, which she later would see as a "throwback".

On the January 17, 2017, episode of SmackDown Live, James made her return by helping Alexa Bliss retain her SmackDown Women's Championship against Becky Lynch in a Steel Cage match, revealing herself as the woman under the "La Luchadora" gimmick and establishing herself as a heel character, while also allying with Bliss. She competed in her first match in nearly seven years in a WWE main roster ring on January 29, 2017, at the Royal Rumble pay–per–view, teaming with Bliss and Natalya against Lynch, Naomi, and Nikki Bella in a losing effort. James went on to face Lynch at the Elimination Chamber pay–per–view in another losing effort. She would defeat Lynch in a rematch on the edition of February 14 of SmackDown, but would lose a Two-Out-of-Three Falls match two weeks later to end the storyline. In March, James turned face after hitting Bliss with a Mick Kick, ending their brief alliance and leading to a non-title match between the two on the edition of March 14 of SmackDown, in which James was victorious. At WrestleMania 33, James took part in a six–pack challenge for Bliss’ SmackDown Women's Championship, which saw Naomi winning the title.

Shortly after Wrestlemania, James was drafted to Raw as part of the 2017 Superstar Shake–Up. In October, after being named the No. 1 Contender by Raw General Manager Kurt Angle, James faced Bliss for the Raw Women's Championship at TLC: Tables, Ladders & Chairs, but was unsuccessful in capturing the title. A few weeks later on the edition of October 30 of Raw, James once again challenged Bliss for the title in the main event but came up short. On January 28, 2018, at the Royal Rumble, James entered the first-ever women's Royal Rumble match at No. 26 and lasted over 8 minutes before being eliminated by long–time rival Trish Stratus. The following month, James competed in the first-ever women's Elimination Chamber match at the namesake pay–per–view, where she entered at No. 5 and eliminated Sonya Deville after a diving Lou Thesz press off the top of a pod before being eliminated by Bayley.

On the February 26 episode of Raw, James proceeded to turn heel and realigned herself with Bliss. At WrestleMania 34, James participated in the first-ever WrestleMania Women's Battle Royal for the WrestleMania Women's Battle Royal Trophy, but was eliminated from the match by Ruby Riott. Later that night, she had planned to manage Bliss to her title defense against Nia Jax, but was attacked and ejected by Jax before the match began. In May, James competed unsuccessfully in a Triple Threat match against Bliss and Bayley, as well as a Gauntlet match in attempts to qualify for the women's Money in the Bank ladder match. In August, James returned from a brief hiatus at the sides of Alexa Bliss and Alicia Fox. With Bliss, the tandem began a scripted feud with her former rivals and WWE Hall of Famers Trish Stratus and Lita, setting up a tag team match at WWE Evolution, WWE's first-ever all-women's pay–per–view. Just three days before the event on October 25, however, it was announced that Bliss was pulled out of the match due to a concussion, and that Fox would be her replacement. In the event's opening contest, James and Fox were unsuccessful against Stratus and Lita.

On November 18 at Survivor Series, James was selected by Bliss to be a part of Team Raw along with Nia Jax, Tamina, Bayley and Sasha Banks to go against Team SmackDown's Naomi, Carmella, Sonya Deville, Asuka and Mandy Rose. Team Raw came out victorious after Jax was the sole survivor. The victory also upped James’ undefeated streak to 5–0 at Survivor Series. The next night on Raw, James was selected by “General Manager-Elect” Baron Corbin to answer an open-challenge by Raw Women's Champion Ronda Rousey, but lost the title match via submission. Meanwhile, James and Bobby Lashley were announced as one of the teams that would be competing in season 2 of Mixed Match Challenge. Despite pulling ahead with a 3–0 lead on the competition, the duo lost to Bayley and Finn Bálor in the playoffs and were eliminated from the tournament. Back on Raw, James made history on the edition of December 17 by competing in the most matches by a female Superstar in the show's 25-year history with 164 total combined matches by this point. On January 27, 2019, at the Royal Rumble, James entered the second women's Royal Rumble match at number 5 and lasted over 11 minutes before being eliminated by Tamina. The following night on Raw, James once again aligned herself with Bliss in hopes of qualifying for the Elimination Chamber event to crown the first-ever WWE Women's Tag Team Champions, but the long-time allies lost their tag team match to Nia Jax and Tamina. James would later compete in the second-annual WrestleMania Women's Battle Royal at WrestleMania 35 for the trophy, eliminating Mandy Rose from the match before subsequently being eliminated by Sonya Deville.

==== Brand switches and departure (2019–2021) ====
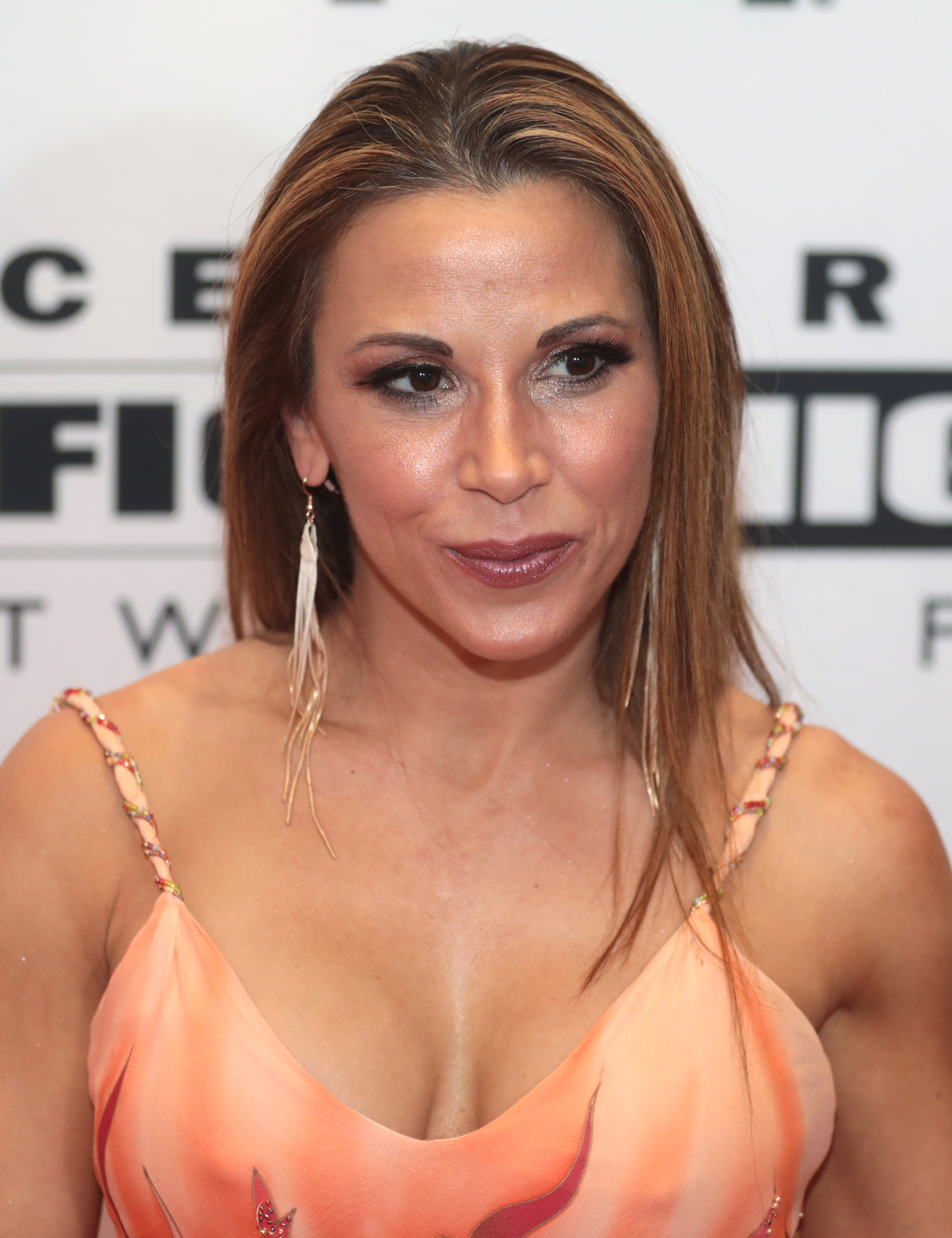
James in 2019

As part of the 2019 Superstar Shake-up, James was drafted back to the SmackDown brand. During a live event on June 1, it was reported that James had suffered a torn ACL. On July 16, James underwent successful knee surgery and would be out of action for seven to nine months. During her recovery from injury, James would become a commentator for Main Event.

After 14 months of injury, James returned on the August 10, 2020, episode of Raw as a face, only to have her interview interrupted by Natalya and Lana. This set up a singles match against Natalya the following week, which saw James lose by countout thanks to interference from Lana. On the August 31 episode of Raw, James confronted the Raw Women's Champion Asuka, stating her intentions of going after the title. During this exchange, Lana and Natalya interrupted staking their claims, leading to a singles match between James and Lana in which James defeated her via pinfall. On the September 14 episode of Raw, James challenged Asuka for the Raw Women's Championship, but lost after a botched finish due to the referee believing that James could no longer compete. In the 2020 WWE Draft in October, James went undrafted.

Her first post-draft appearance occurred on January 4, 2021, during the special "Legends Night" episode of Raw, appearing alongside several other WWE legends. That same month, James competed in the women's Royal Rumble match entering at No. 19, but was eliminated by Lacey Evans. In April, she appeared on stage during the opening of WrestleMania 37 alongside the rest of the active roster. On April 15, 2021, WWE announced that they had released Mickie James along with several other talent. Prior, she had participated in commentary on shows such as Main Event and NXT. Her release was met with some controversy, as she claimed her belongings were sent to her in a trash bag. Several other former talent such as Jillian Hall, Maria Kanellis and Gail Kim voiced similar experiences when they were fired. The senior employee responsible for this was let go, and James received a public apology from Stephanie McMahon.

=== National Wrestling Alliance (2021–2022) ===
James made her National Wrestling Alliance debut on the June 8, 2021, episode of NWA Powerrr, announcing that she will serve as an executive producer for the first all-female event, NWA EmPowerrr. On June 23, James announced on an Instagram video that she will be returning to the ring and delivers an open challenge to anyone to wrestle her at the NWA 73rd Anniversary Show. The challenge was answered by Kylie Rae, whom James defeated.

James last appearance on NWA was on the May 3, 2022, of Powerrr, where she defeated Kenzie Paige.

=== Third return to Impact Wrestling (2021–2023) ===
==== Fourth Knockouts championship reign (2021–2022) ====
At Slammiversary on July 17, 2021, James made her third return to TNA, now known as Impact Wrestling, after a six-year absence, inviting Impact Knockouts Champion Deonna Purrazzo to defend the title at NWA EmPowerrr, where she is executive producer, only for Purrazzo to give her disrespect, then James kicked Purrazzo in the face. Purrazzo would eventually accept James' invite, successfully defending the Knockouts Championship against Melina at NWA EmPowerrr. The next night, at NWA 73, Purrazzo attacked James after the latter's match with Kylie Rae.

On the September 23 episode of Impact!, it was announced that James would make her in-ring return to Impact, as she challenged Purrazzo for the Knockouts Championship at Bound for Glory. On the September 30 episode of Impact!, Purrazzo attacked James at her home and wild brawl ensued with Purrazzo coming out on top after dunking James head in a bucket of water and leaving her laid out in a field. At Bound for Glory, James defeated Purrazzo to win the Impact Knockouts Championship for the fourth time. At Turning Point, after successfully retained the title against Mercedes Martinez, James was attacked by Purrazzo, who announced that she would invoke her rematch clause at Hard To Kill. At the event, on January 8, 2022, James successfully retained the title against Purrazzo in a Texas Deathmatch.

==== The Last Rodeo and WWE appearance (2022–2023) ====
At Sacrifice, James lost her Knockouts World Championship to Tasha Steelz, ending her fourth reign at 133 days. During a rematch, James was betrayed by best friend Chelsea Green, who turned heel. After teasing retirement on Twitter, James returned on the September 1, 2022, edition of Impact!, to announce that she would retire after she lost her next match unless she won the Knockouts World Championship once more, while also naming her final run The Last Rodeo. She went on to win every match after this announcement, defeating Gisele Shaw at Victory Road, Mia Yim at Bound for Glory, Taylor Wilde at Over Drive, and eventually Jordynne Grace at Hard To Kill to end The Last Rodeo, winning the Knockouts World Championship for the fifth time.

On the January 7, 2022, episode of SmackDown, James was announced as a participant in the women's Royal Rumble match at Royal Rumble, while being acknowledged as Impact Knockouts World Champion. Later that night, Impact Wrestling also promoted her upcoming appearance. It was the first direct crossover of any kind between WWE and Impact Wrestling. During the Royal Rumble, she entered at No. 20 with her Impact theme (Hardcore Country) and with the Impact Knockouts World Championship belt. She lasted just under 12 minutes in the match, managing to eliminate her former rival Michelle McCool and was later eliminated by another former rival, Lita.

On February 28, at No Surrender, James successfully defended the title against Masha Slamovich. James was scheduled to defend the title against Grace at Sacrifice on March 24, however, it was revealed that James would not be able to defend the title due to real-life injury. On the April 13 episode of Impact! upon Rebellion, which was filmed on tape delay on March 13, James relinquished the title as she was not medically cleared to compete.

At Bound for Glory, James lost to Trinity failing to win the Impact Knockouts World Championship in her final match for the company.

On September 22, 2025, it was announced that James would be inducted into the TNA Hall of Fame on October 12 at Bound for Glory.

=== Return to OVW (2024–present) ===
In 2024, James signed with Ohio Valley Wrestling (OVW) as Creative Director, Head of Female Talent and Executive Producer of OVW's wrestling shows.

=== Fourth return to TNA (2026) ===
At No Surrender 2026, James made a surprise return to Total Nonstop Action (TNA) Wrestling, interrupting a post-match celebration to attack Ash by Elegance. Following the tag title match, James engaged in a brawl with The Elegance Brand before being assisted by Indi Hartwell and Xia Brookside. On the February 19, 2026 episode of TNA Impact!, Ash called out James and called her to a match the following week. James would then make an appearance on the February 26, 2026 episode of Impact!, where she confronted Ash, and following a brawl, was attacked on the ramp by the Elegance Brand after being lured to the back after they were spotted with her son.

== Music career ==
James' first country music album, Strangers & Angels, was released on May 18, 2010, on iTunes. The album was self-released with an independent team. On December 2, 2010, James released another single called, "Hardcore Country", which was also used as her entrance music with TNA and on their independent circuit appearances. A music video for the single was first shown during James's first appearance on TNA Spin Cycle. For her second album, James joined a Kickstarter campaign in order to partially fund the album. Fans who contributed donations received special items from the campaign. The online campaign was a success, with a total pledge of $16,500 out of a $5,000 goal. The funds helped to produce the first six songs from the album. The album, called "Somebody's Gonna Pay" was released on May 7, 2013, under the label Entertainment One (eOne) Music, and debuted on the music charts at No. 15 on the Billboards Heatseekers charts. James also filmed a music video for the song "Somebody's Gonna Pay", from her second album of the same name. The video features former WWE Women's Champion, Trish Stratus and James' then-fiancé Magnus. TNA founder, Jeff Jarrett, was also on set of the video in Nashville, Tennessee. Jarrett did not appear in the video, but taught James how to swing a guitar. While she worked for TNA, James also toured around the United States, holding small concerts at various venues.

James has opened shows for Montgomery Gentry, Randy Houser, Gretchen Wilson and Rascal Flatts. James also performed at the 2011 CMA Music Festival. James again performed at CMA Fest in 2013, where Eric Young and James Storm made appearances at the event. In 2014, James collaborated with country artist Cowboy Troy and fellow wrestler James Storm on a song titled "Is Everybody Doing OK", which is featured on Cowboy Troy's album, King of Clubs.

On November 19, 2016, James released a new song entitled "Shooting Blanks".

On October 14, 2017, James was inducted into The Native American Music Awards Hall of Fame. She also received a Nammy for "Song of the Year" for her recording "Shooting Blanks". On October 13, 2018, James won “Best Single Recording” for her song “Left Right Left” at the Native American Music Awards.

=== Studio albums ===
List of studio albums, with selected chart positions and details
Title	Album details	Peak chart positions	
Title	Album details	US Country	US Heat
Strangers & Angels	Released: May 18, 2010; Label: Independent; Format: CD, digital download	—	—
Somebody's Gonna Pay	Released: May 7, 2013; Label: Entertainment One; Format: CD, digital download	56	15

=== Singles ===
List of singles, showing year released and album name
Title	Year	Album
"Are You With Me"	2010	Strangers & Angels
"Hardcore Country"	2010	Somebody's Gonna Pay
"Somebody's Gonna Pay"	2013	Somebody's Gonna Pay
"Shooting Blanks"	2016	Non-album singles
"Get Down"	2017	Non-album singles
"Don't Be Afraid to Fly"	2018	Non-album singles
"Left Right Left" (featuring Ying Yang Twins)	2018	Non-album singles
"I Don't Give A"	2019	Non-album singles
"Great Minds"	2019	Non-album singles
"Christmas Presence"	2019	Non-album singles
"With the Love of a Child" (featuring Rosevelt Sings & Holy Spirit Catholic School Tuscaloosa Choir)	2020	Non-album singles
"Grown Ass Woman" (with Chapel Hart)	2021	Non-album singles
"Pissed"	2022	Non-album singles
"Sandbar Sunsets"	2023	Non-album singles

=== Music videos ===
List of music videos, showing year released and directors
Title	Year	Director(s)	Ref.
As lead artist
"Somebody's Gonna Pay"	2013	Blake Judd	
"Left Right Left" (featuring Ying Yang Twins)	2018	Unknown	
"I Don't Give A"	2019	Unknown	

=== Guest appearances ===
Title	Year	Other artist(s)	Album
"Is Everybody Doing OK"	2014	Cowboy Troy, "The Cowboy" James Storm	King of Clubs

== Other media ==
James, along with Ken Anderson, represented WWE at the 2008 Republican National Convention, in an effort to persuade fans to register to vote in the 2008 Presidential election. On April 13, 2008, James, along with Layla, Melina and Kelly Kelly, appeared as guest trainers in Over the Ropes. On September 5 of that same year, James appeared on the USA Network show Psych, portraying a villainous roller derby girl called Rita "Lethal Weapon" Westwood, in the episode "Talk Derby to Me". James made a special appearance on Redemption Song which is hosted by Chris Jericho along with Candice Michelle, Maryse, and Eve Torres. It was originally aired on November 12, 2008. In 2012, James was featured in Bucky Covington's music video for his song "Drinking Side of Country". In June 2013, James starred in a Dr Pepper advert, which featured "One of a Kind" individuals talking about the role of Dr. Pepper in their lives. James joined the cast of The Last Match: A Pro-Wrestling Rock Experience for their national tour in April 2024. Mickie James also appeared in the Red Paint Film "Days of Sodom: A Crow Fan Film" which was filmed and directed by Cody Faulk.

Video game appearances
Year	Title	Ref.
2006	WWE SmackDown vs. Raw 2007	
2007	WWE SmackDown vs. Raw 2008	
2008	WWE SmackDown vs. Raw 2009	
2009	WWE SmackDown vs. Raw 2010	
2010	WWE SmackDown vs. Raw 2011	
2017	WWE 2K18	
2018	WWE 2K19	
2019	WWE 2K20	
2020	WWE 2K Battlegrounds	
2022	WWE 2K22	

Film
Year	Title	Role	Ref.
2026	Days of Sodom: A Crow Fan Film	Tara Dawson	

== Personal life ==
Through her mother, Mickie James is half-Native American of the Mattaponi Tribe of Virginia which was one of six core tribes of the Powhatan Confederation.

When James retires from wrestling, she plans to own a farm and become a horse trainer. She owns three Morgan horses named Rhapsody, Bunny and Casanova, as well as two dogs, one named Butch and a Miniature Pinscher named Elvis. Outside of wrestling, James received her Associate of Arts degree in business administration, and studied for her Bachelor of Arts degree in operations management.

James has a tattoo of a symbol meaning 'love' on her ankle, and a dragon that wraps around it. She is a fan of equestrianism and American football, supporting the Dallas Cowboys.

In 2007, James was engaged to fellow wrestler Kenny Dykstra. In December 2010, James started dating English professional wrestler Nick Aldis and on September 25, 2014, they had their first child. James and Aldis got engaged in December 2014 and married on December 31, 2015. Her son would make a televised appearance on the February 27, 2026 episode of TNA Impact!.

On November 28, 2022, James' brother, Wayne, his 16-year-old stepdaughter, and her best friend, died in a car accident which also involved Wayne's wife, who was left in critical condition.

== Championships and accomplishments ==
=== Music ===
- Native American Music Awards
  - Hall of Fame (2017)
  - The Jim Thorpe Sports Award (2019)

=== Professional wrestling ===
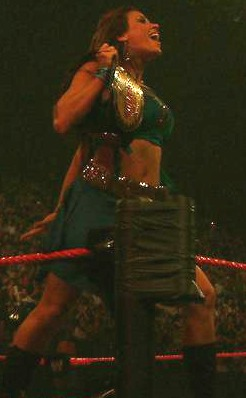
James is a six-time women's champion in WWE, winning the WWE Women's Championship five times, along with one reign with the WWE Divas Championship

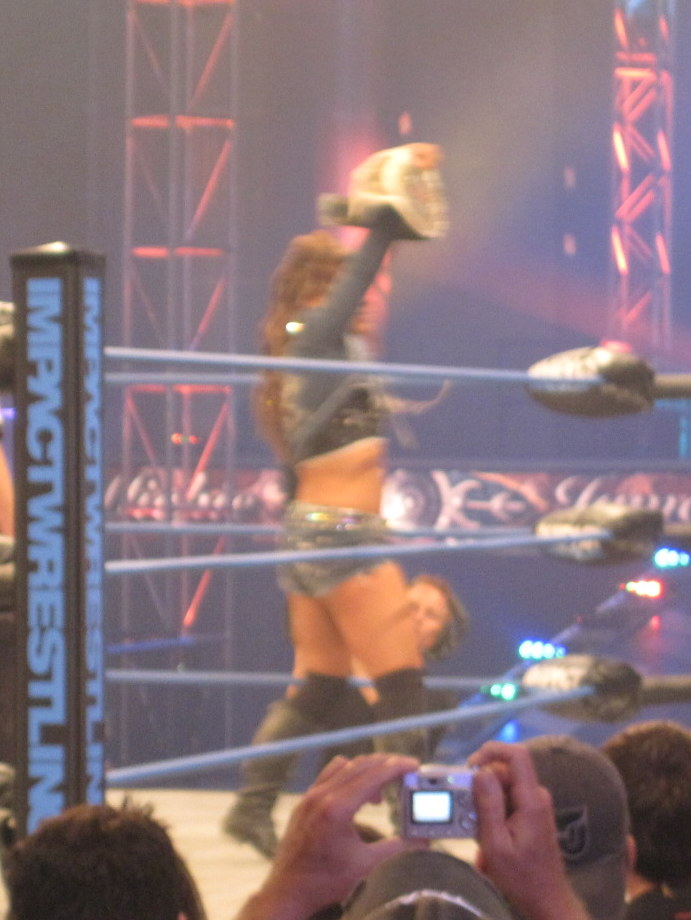
In TNA / Impact Wrestling, James is a five-time TNA / Impact Knockouts World Champion

- Association Biterroise de Catch
  - ABC Women's Championship (1 time, current)
  - Max Soulié Cup (2024)
  - Jean Corne Cup (2023)
- Cauliflower Alley Club
  - Women's Wrestling Award (2023)
- The Baltimore Sun
  - Woman of the Year (2010)
- Covey Promotions
  - CP Women's Championship (1 time)
  - Covey Pro Hall of Fame (2014)
- CyberSpace Wrestling Federation
  - CSWF Women's Championship (1 time)
- Dynamite Championship Wrestling
  - DCW Women's Championship (1 title)
- Florida Championship Wrestling
  - FCW Women's Championship (1 time)
  - NAWF Indian Tribal Women's Championship (1 time)
- Ground Xero Wrestling
  - GXW Women's Championship (1 time)
- Impact Championship Wrestling
  - ICW Super Juniors Championship (1 time)
- International Pro Wrestling: United Kingdom
  - IPW:UK Women's Championship (1 time)
- Midwest All-Star Wrestling
  - MAW Jackpot Junction Championship (1 time, current)
- Maryland Championship Wrestling
  - MCW Women's Championship (1 time)
- Premier Wrestling Federation
  - PWF Universal Women's Championship (1 time)
- Pro Wrestling Illustrated
  - Stanley Weston Award (2024)
  - Woman of the Year (2009, 2011)
  - Ranked No. 1 of the top 50 female wrestlers in the PWI Female 50 in 2009
- Southern Championship Wrestling
  - SCW Diva Championship (1 time)
- Total Nonstop Action Wrestling / Impact Wrestling
  - TNA/Impact Knockouts World Championship (5 times)
  - TNA World Cup of Wrestling (2013) – with Christopher Daniels, James Storm, Kazarian, and Kenny King
  - Impact Year End Award (1 time)
    - Knockouts Match of the Year (2021) vs. Deonna Purrazzo at Bound for Glory
  - TNA Hall of Fame (Class of 2025)
- Ultimate Championship Wrestling
  - UCW Women's Championship (1 time)
- Ultimate Wrestling Federation
  - UWF Women's Championship (2 times)
- Wrestling Observer Newsletter
  - Most Disgusting Promotional Tactic (2009)
- World Wrestling Entertainment
  - WWE Women's Championship (5 times)
  - WWE Divas Championship (1 time)

== Luchas de Apuestas record ==
Winner (wager)	Loser (wager)	Location	Event	Date	Notes
Mickie James (hair)	Madison Rayne (title)	Cincinnati, Ohio	TNA Lockdown	April 17, 2011	
Mickie James (career)	Jordynne Grace (title)	Atlanta, Georgia	Hard to Kill	January 13, 2023	

== Awards and nominations ==
Organizations	Year	Category	Nominated work	Result
Native American Music Awards	2017	Song/Single of the Year	"Shooting Blanks"	Won
Native American Music Awards	2018	Best Country Recording	"Don’t be Afraid to Fly"	Nominated
Native American Music Awards	2018	Best Single Recording	"Left Right Left"	Won
Native American Music Awards	2018	Best Music Video for a Concept	"Left Right Left"	Nominated
