= Strangers & Angels =

Studio album by Mickie James
- Released: May 18, 2010
- Recorded: 2009–10
- Genre: Country
- Length: 40:55
- Producer: Kent Wells

Mickie James chronology
Strangers & Angels (2010)	Somebody's Gonna Pay (2013)

Singles from Strangers & Angels
- 1. "Are You With Me" Released: February 16, 2010

Strangers & Angels is the debut studio album by American professional wrestler and country singer Mickie James. It was released independently on May 18, 2010. The album was recorded in Nashville, Tennessee and produced by Kent Wells. It features a mix of original songs and material written by established country songwriters.

== Background ==
In 2009, while on the road with WWE, James began the recording process of her first album. Recording sessions for Strangers & Angels took place in Nashville, Tennessee with producer Kent Wells, who had previously worked with Dolly Parton on her 2008 album "Backwoods Barbie". James explained that her fellow professional wrestlers in were surprised when she announced her decision to record an album, questioning the challenge of balancing it with the demanding wrestling schedule. The support for the album was mostly positive.

On February 16, 2010, James' debut single titled "Are You With Me" was released. James stated that the song was a last minute addition to the album. Strangers & Angels was originally scheduled for release on March 17, 2010, However, James later announced that she was postponing the release of the album until May to allow her to recover from a staph infection and prepare for WrestleMania XXVI.

== Release and promotion ==
James first performed "Are You With Me" at the Wildhorse Saloon in Nashville, Tennessee as the opener for the likes of Rascal Flatts, Kellie Pickler, Jason Michael Carroll, Keith Anderson and Little Big Town. James held her album-release party ath the Red Rooster bar in Nashville on May 20, 2010. In attendance was TNA president Dixie Carter. Following the release of the album, James was featured in the spotlight section in the print publication of the Country Music Association. James described it as being "an absolute honor".

== Track listing ==
"Strangers & Angels" track listing
No.	Title	Writer(s)	Length
1.	"Are You With Me"	Ben Hayslip; Dallas Davidson; Rhett Akins	3:11
2.	"Hollywood Movie Moment"	Mickie James; Brad Wolf; Don Goodman	3:11
3.	"I Call the Fight"	Evie Nicole; Jackie Dipillo	3:46
4.	"Freedom Song"	Chris Tompkins; Josh Kear; Mark Irwin	3:17
5.	"Strangers & Angels"	Tompkins; Jess Cates; Kara DioGuardi	4:14
6.	"Make Me Feel Like a Woman"	Connie Harrington; Marla Cannon-Goodman	3:57
7.	"Fallin' Over Again"	David Brainard; Jennifer Zuffinetti	4:36
8.	"When You Come Home Tonight"	Harrington; Robin Lee Bruce	4:05
9.	"I'm No Good At Pretending"	James; Wolf; Goodman	3:08
10.	"Don't Apologize"	James; Tommy Wood	4:16
11.	"Dumb Bitch"	Amanda Williams; Stacy Donahue	3:14
Total length:			40:55
