= 2006 in professional wrestling =

2006 in professional wrestling describes the year's events in the world of professional wrestling.

== List of notable promotions ==
These promotions held notable events in 2006.

Promotion Name	Abbreviation	Notes
Consejo Mundial de Lucha Libre	CMLL	
Georgia Championship Wrestling	GCW	
Hustle	–	
Lucha Libre AAA Worldwide	AAA	The "AAA" abbreviation has been used since the mid-1990s and had previously stood for the promotion's original name Asistencia Asesoría y Administración.
New Japan Pro-Wrestling	NJPW	
Pro Wrestling Guerrilla	PWG	
Ring of Honor	ROH	
Sal Corrente	–	
Total Nonstop Action Wrestling	TNA	
World Wrestling Council	WWC	
World Wrestling Entertainment	WWE	WWE divided its roster into two storyline divisions, Raw and SmackDown!, referred to as brands, where wrestlers exclusively performed on their respective weekly television programs. A third brand, ECW, was launched in June, a relaunch of the former Extreme Championship Wrestling promotion, which WWE had acquired in 2003.

== Calendar of notable shows ==
=== January ===
Date	Promotion(s)	Event	Location	Main Event	Notes
4	NJPW	Toukon Shidou Chapter 1	Tokyo, Japan	Brock Lesnar (c) defeated Shinsuke Nakamura in a Singles match to retain the IWGP Heavyweight Championship	
8	WWE: Raw	New Year's Revolution	Albany, New York	Edge defeated John Cena (c) for the WWE Championship when he cashed in his Money in the Bank briefcase	
15	TNA	Final Resolution	Orlando	Christian Cage and Sting defeated Jeff Jarrett and Monty Brown in a Tag team match	This event was Sting's debut in TNA
29	WWE: Raw; SmackDown!	Royal Rumble	Miami, Florida	Kurt Angle (c) defeated Mark Henry in a Singles match to retain the World Heavyweight Championship	Rey Mysterio won the Royal Rumble match and chose to challenge for the World Heavyweight Championship at WrestleMania 22
(c) – denotes defending champion(s)

=== February ===
Date	Promotion(s)	Event	Location	Main Event	Notes
12	TNA	Against All Odds	Orlando	Christian Cage defeated Jeff Jarrett (c) in a Singles match to win the NWA World Heavyweight Championship	
19	WWE: SmackDown!	No Way Out	Baltimore, Maryland	Kurt Angle (c) defeated The Undertaker in a Singles match to retain the World Heavyweight Championship	Rey Mysterio lost his WrestleMania 22 World Heavyweight Championship opportunity to Randy Orton, but still ended up being in the championship match at WrestleMania
25	ROH	Fourth Anniversary Show	Edison, New Jersey	Generation Next (Austin Aries & Roderick Strong) (c) defeated A.J. Styles & Matt Sydal to retain ROH Tag Team Championship	
(c) – denotes defending champion(s)

=== March ===
Date	Promotion(s)	Event	Location	Main Event
4	WWE: SmackDown!	WWE SmackDown Road to WrestleMania 22 Tour	Wellington, New Zealand	Kurt Angle (c) defeated Mark Henry and The Undertaker by disqualification in a Triple Threat match to retain the World Heavyweight Championship
5	Sal Corrente	World Wrestling Legends	Orlando, Florida	Scott Steiner defeated Buff Bagwell in a Singles match
10	AAA	Rey de Reyes	Ciudad Madero, Mexico	Elimination match for the 2006 Rey de Reyes trophy
12	TNA	Destination X	Orlando	Christian Cage (c) defeated Monty Brown in a Singles match to retain the NWA World Heavyweight Championship
18	WWE: Raw; SmackDown!	Saturday Night's Main Event XXXII	Detroit, Michigan	Shane McMahon defeated Shawn Michaels in a Street Fight
25	ROH	Best in the World	New York, New York	KENTA and Naomichi Marufuji defeated Samoa Joe and Bryan Danielson
31	ROH	Supercard of Honor	Chicago Ridge, Illinois	Bryan Danielson (c) defeated Roderick Strong to retain the ROH World Championship
(c) – denotes defending champion(s)

=== April ===
Date	Promotion(s)	Event	Location	Main Event	Notes
2	WWE: Raw; SmackDown!	WrestleMania 22	Rosemont, Illinois	John Cena (c) defeated Triple H in a Singles match to retain the WWE Championship	This was CM Punk's first appearance in WWE – who wrestled in Ohio Valley Wrestling at the time
23	TNA	Lockdown	Orlando	Sting's Warriors (Sting, A.J. Styles, Ron Killings and Rhino) defeated Jeff Jarrett's Army (Jeff Jarrett, Scott Steiner, Chris Harris and James Storm)	This event was Christy Hemme's debut in TNA
28	CMLL	50. Aniversario de Arena México	Mexico City, Mexico	Los Guerreros de la Atlantida (Rey Bucanero and Tarzan Boy) defeated Los Perros del Mal (Damián 666 and Mr. Águila) in a Best two-out-of-three falls Lucha de Apuestas hair vs. hair match	
30	WWE: Raw	Backlash	Lexington, Kentucky	John Cena (c) defeated Triple H, and Edge in Triple threat match to retain the WWE Championship	
(c) – denotes defending champion(s)

=== May ===
Date	Promotion(s)	Event	Location	Main Event
12	CMLL	International Gran Prix	Mexico City, Mexico	Black Warrior defeated Místico (c) in a Best two-out-of-three falls match for the NWA World Middleweight Championship
14	TNA	Sacrifice	Orlando	Christian Cage (c) defeated Abyss in the Full Metal Mayhem match to retain the NWA World Heavyweight Championship
21	WWE: SmackDown!	Judgment Day	Phoenix, Arizona	Rey Mysterio (c) defeated John "Bradshaw" Layfield in a Singles match to retain the World Heavyweight Championship
(c) – denotes defending champion(s)

=== June ===
Date	Promotion(s)	Event	Location	Main Event	Notes
7	WWE: Raw; SmackDown!; ECW	WWE vs. ECW Head-to-Head	Dayton, Ohio	John Cena (WWE) defeated Sabu (ECW) by disqualification in a Singles match	
11	WWE: ECW	One Night Stand	New York City	Rob Van Dam cashed in his Money in the Bank contract and defeated John Cena (c) in an Extreme Rules match to win the WWE Championship	First WWE PPV for the ECW brand, a relaunch of the former Extreme Championship Wrestling promotion.
18	AAA	Triplemanía XIV	Naucalpan, Mexico	La Parka defeated Muerta Cibernética in a Best two-out-of-three falls Lucha de Apuesta, "Mask vs. Mask" match. As a result, Muerte Cibernetica was unmasked and revealed to be Ricky Banderas	
18	TNA	Slammiversary	Orlando	Jeff Jarrett defeated Christian Cage (c), Abyss, Ron Killings and Sting in the King of the Mountain match to win the NWA World Heavyweight Championship	
25	WWE: Raw	Vengeance	Charlotte, North Carolina	D-Generation X (Triple H and Shawn Michaels) defeated The Spirit Squad (Kenny, Johnny, Mitch, Nicky, and Mikey) in a Handicap match	Last WWE PPV appearance for Kurt Angle as an in-ring performer until 2017
(c) – denotes defending champion(s)

=== July ===
Date	Promotion(s)	Event	Location	Main Event	Notes
9-11	Hustle	Hustle King Memorial Six Man Tag Team Tournament	Kanagawa and Tokyo, Japan	Various matches	
15	ROH	Death Before Dishonor IV	Philadelphia, Pennsylvania	ROH (Samoa Joe, Adam Pearce, B. J. Whitmer, Ace Steel and Homicide) defeated CZW (Chris Hero, Claudio Castagnoli, Necro Butcher, Nate Webb and Eddie Kingston) in a Cage of Death	
15	WWE: Raw; SmackDown!; ECW	Saturday Night's Main Event XXXIII	Dallas, Texas	John Cena defeated Edge (c) by disqualification in a Singles match for the WWE Championship	
16	TNA	Victory Road	Orlando	Sting defeated Scott Steiner, Samoa Joe and Christian Cage in the Road to Victory match	
23	WWE: SmackDown!	The Great American Bash	Indianapolis, Indiana	King Booker defeated Rey Mysterio (c) in a Singles match to win the World Heavyweight Championship	First event to feature a Punjabi Prison match
(c) – denotes defending champion(s)

=== August ===
Date	Promotion(s)	Event	Location	Main Event	Notes
12	WWC	33rd WWC Aniversario	Bayamón, Puerto Rico	Carlito defeated X-Pac in a Singles match	
6-13	NJPW	G1 Climax	Tokyo	Hiroyoshi Tenzan defeated Satoshi Kojima in a G1 Climax tournament	
13	TNA	Hard Justice	Orlando	Jeff Jarrett (c) defeated Sting in a Singles match to retain the NWA World Heavyweight Championship	
16	N/A	NZPWI Invitational	Lynfield, New Zealand	Alfred Valentine defeated Sweet Ass in a Singles match	
20	WWE: Raw; SmackDown!; ECW	SummerSlam	Boston, Massachusetts	Edge (c) defeated John Cena in a Singles match to retain the WWE Championship	This PPV is notable for being the last WWE event to feature a match for Hulk Hogan who wrestled Randy Orton
(c) – denotes defending champion(s)

=== September ===
Date	Promotion(s)	Event	Location	Main Event	Notes
1-3	PWG	Battle of Los Angeles	Reseda, California	Davey Richards defeated Cima and Super Dragon in a via pinfall in 13:42 to win the 2006 Battle of Los Angeles tournament	
15	ROH	Glory By Honor V	East Windsor, Connecticut	KENTA and Naomichi Marufuji defeated The Briscoe Brothers (Jay and Mark Briscoe)	
16	ROH	Glory By Honor V	New York City, New York	Bryan Danielson (c) defeated KENTA to retain the ROH World Championship	
17	AAA	Verano de Escándalo	Naucalpan, Mexico	Gronda, Octagón, and La Parka defeated La Legión Extranjera (Abyss, Jeff Jarrett, and Konnan) by disqualification in a Six-man "Lucha Libre rules" tag team match	
17	WWE: Raw	Unforgiven	Toronto, Ontario	John Cena defeated Edge (c) in the Tables, Ladders, and Chairs match to win the WWE Championship; Had Cena lost, Cena would leave Raw for SmackDown!	This event featured Trish Stratus's retirement match. She won the match after forcing Lita to submit to the sharpshooter, thus becoming a record setting seven time WWE Women's Champion. She would periodically return later and had a second retirement match in 2019.
23	GCW	Third Annual Fred Ward Memorial Show	Columbus, Georgia	Chris Stevens (c) defeated Elix Skipper and Johnny Swinger in a No-DQ Three-Way Dance match for the GCW Heavyweight Championship	
24	TNA	No Surrender	Orlando	Samoa Joe defeated Jeff Jarrett in a "Fan's Revenge" Lumberjack match	At the end of the event, it was announced that Kurt Angle had been signed with TNA
29	CMLL	CMLL 73rd Anniversary Show	Mexico City, Mexico	Místico defeated Black Warrior in a Lucha de Apuestas mask vs. mask match	
(c) – denotes defending champion(s)

=== October ===
Date	Promotion(s)	Event	Location	Main Event	Notes
8	WWE: SmackDown!	No Mercy	Raleigh, North Carolina	King Booker (c) defeated Bobby Lashley, Batista and Finlay in Fatal 4-way match to retain the World Heavyweight Championship	
20	N/A	Pitbull/Public Enemy Memorial Cup	Philadelphia, Pennsylvania	All Money Is Legal (K-Murda and K-Pusha) defeated The Rottweilers (Homicide and Ricky Reyes)	
22	TNA	Bound for Glory	Plymouth Township, Michigan	Sting defeated Jeff Jarrett (c) in Title vs. Career match to win the NWA World Heavyweight Championship with Kurt Angle as the special outside enforcer	This event was Kurt Angle's first appearance in TNA PPV
(c) – denotes defending champion(s)

=== November ===
Date	Promotion(s)	Event	Location	Main Event	Notes
5	WWE: Raw	Cyber Sunday	Cincinnati, Ohio	King Booker (c) (SmackDown) defeated John Cena (Raw) and Big Show (ECW) in a Triple threat match to retain the World Heavyweight Championship	
19	TNA	Genesis	Orlando	Kurt Angle defeated Samoa Joe in a Singles match	
26	WWE: Raw; SmackDown!; ECW	Survivor Series	Philadelphia, Pennsylvania	Batista defeated King Booker (c) in Last Chance match to win the World Heavyweight Championship	This featured Lita's retirement match, where she lost the WWE Women's Championship to Mickie James. Lita would return for a couple of matches in 2018.
(c) – denotes defending champion(s)

=== December ===
Date	Promotion(s)	Event	Location	Main Event	Notes
3	WWE: ECW	December to Dismember	Augusta, Georgia	Bobby Lashley defeated Big Show (c), Rob Van Dam, Hardcore Holly, CM Punk, and Test in an Extreme Elimination Chamber match to win the ECW World Championship	This PPV event was universally panned and is often considered to be the worst wrestling PPV event of all time Last WWE PPV appearance for Paul Heyman until 2012; This event received the lowest buyrate in WWE history until the introduction of the WWE Network in 2014. Final ECW-exclusive PPV before all WWE PPVs became tri-branded.
8	AAA	Guerra de Titanes	Madero, Mexico	Cibernético defeated Muerte Cibernetica in a Singles match	
10	TNA	Turning Point	Orlando	Samoa Joe defeated Kurt Angle in a Singles match	
15	CMLL	Sin Piedad	Mexico City	Shocker and Universo 2000 defeated Kenzo Suzuki and Marco Corleone	
17	WWE: SmackDown!	Armageddon	Richmond, Virginia	Batista and John Cena (Raw) defeated King Booker and Finlay in a Tag team match	
23	ROH	Final Battle	New York, New York	Homicide defeated Bryan Danielson (c) to win the ROH World Championship	
25	WWE: Raw	Tribute to the Troops	Baghdad, Iraq	Carlito defeated Randy Orton in a Singles match	
(c) – denotes defending champion(s)

== Accomplishments and tournaments ==
=== AAA ===
Accomplishment	Winner	Date won	Notes
Rey de Reyes	Vampiro	March 10	

=== TNA ===
Accomplishment	Winner	Date won	Notes
2006 TNA World X Cup Tournament	Team TNA	May 18	
Fight for the Right Tournament	Abyss	November 9	

==== TNA Year End Awards ====
Poll	Winner(s)
Tag Team of the Year	A.J. Styles and Christopher Daniels
Knockout of the Year	Christy Hemme
Finisher of the Year	The Canadian Destroyer
Who To Watch in 2007	Kurt Angle
Memorable Moment of the Year	Kurt Angle's debut at No Surrender
Most Inspirational Wrestler of the Year	Eric Young
X Division Star of the Year	Samoa Joe
Feud of the Year	Samoa Joe and Kurt Angle
Match of the Year	Ultimate X Match: A.J. Styles and Christopher Daniels vs. The Latin American Xchange (Hernandez and Homicide) at No Surrender
Mr. TNA	Samoa Joe

=== WWE ===
Accomplishment	Winner	Date won	Notes
Royal Rumble	Rey Mysterio	January 29	Winner received their choice of a championship match for either Raw's WWE Championship or SmackDown's World Heavyweight Championship at WrestleMania 22. Mysterio last eliminated Randy Orton to win and chose to challenge for his own brand's World Heavyweight Championship, but lost his title opportunity to Randy Orton at No Way Out, but still ended up being in the World Heavyweight Championship match at WrestleMania, which became a triple threat match between Mysterio, Orton, and champion Kurt Angle that Mysterio won.
Road to WrestleMania Tournament	Triple H	February 20	Defeated Big Show and Rob Van Dam in the tournament final to determine the number one contender against John Cena for the WWE Championship at WrestleMania 22; Triple H was unsuccessful in winning the title.
Money in the Bank ladder match	Rob Van Dam	April 2	Defeated Bobby Lashley, Finlay, Matt Hardy, Ric Flair, and Shelton Benjamin to win a world championship match contract. Van Dam, who had been drafted to the new ECW brand, used the contract to cash in on Raw's WWE Championship at ECW One Night Stand, where he defeated John Cena to win the title and was also awarded the reinstated ECW World Heavyweight Championship. The WWE Championship transferred to ECW but was transferred back to Raw the following month when Edge defeated Van Dam for the title at Vengeance.
King of the Ring	Booker T	May 21	Defeated Bobby Lashley in the tournament final to win and be crowned King of the Ring; Booker T subsequently changed his ring name to King Booker.
WWE Women's Championship Tournament	Lita	November 6	Defeated Mickie James in the tournament final to win the vacant WWE Women's Championship; previous champion Trish Stratus had retired, thus vacating the title.

==== WWE Hall of Fame ====
Category	Inductee	Inducted by
Individual	Bret "Hit Man" Hart	Stone Cold Steve Austin
Individual	Eddie Guerrero	Chris Benoit, Rey Mysterio, and Chavo Guerrero
Individual	"Mean" Gene Okerlund	Hulk Hogan
Individual	Sensational Sherri	Ted DiBiase
Individual	Verne Gagne	Greg Gagne
Individual	"Mr. USA" Tony Atlas	S. D. Jones
Group	The Blackjacks	Bobby Heenan
Celebrity	William "The Refrigerator" Perry	John Cena

== Awards and honors ==
=== Pro Wrestling Illustrated ===
Category	Winner
PWI Wrestler of the Year	John Cena
PWI Tag Team of the Year	A.J. Styles and Christopher Daniels
PWI Match of the Year	Shawn Michaels vs. Vince McMahon (WrestleMania 22)
PWI Feud of the Year	John Cena vs. Edge
PWI Most Popular Wrestler of the Year	Samoa Joe
PWI Most Hated Wrestler of the Year	Edge
PWI Comeback of the Year	Sting
PWI Most Improved Wrestler of the Year	Bobby Lashley
PWI Most Inspirational Wrestler of the Year	Matt Cappotelli
PWI Rookie of the Year	The Boogeyman
PWI Woman of the Year	Trish Stratus
PWI Lifetime Achievement	Harley Race

=== Wrestling Observer Newsletter ===
==== Wrestling Observer Newsletter Hall of Fame ====
Inductee
Paul Bowser
Eddie Guerrero
Hiroshi Hase
Masakatsu Funaki
Aja Kong

==== Wrestling Observer Newsletter awards ====
Category	Winner
Wrestler of the Year	Místico
Most Outstanding	Bryan Danielson
Best Box Office Draw	Kenta Kobashi
Tag Team of the Year	The Latin American Exchange (Homicide and Hernandez)
Most Improved	Takeshi Morishima
Best on Interviews	Mick Foley

== Title changes ==
=== NJPW ===
IWGP Heavyweight Championship
Incoming champion – Brock Lesnar
Date	Winner	Event/Show	Note(s)
July 15	Vacated	N/A	
July 17	Hiroshi Tanahashi	Circuit 2006 Turbulence	

IWGP Tag Team Championship
Incoming champions – Cho-Ten (Hiroyoshi Tenzan and Masahiro Chono)
Date	Winner	Event/Show	Note(s)
July 2	Shiro Koshinaka and Togi Makabe	Circuit 2006 Turbulence	
September 20	Vacated		
September 28	Wild Child (Manabu Nakanishi and Takao Omori)	Circuit 2006 Final: Next Progress	

IWGP Junior Heavyweight Championship
Incoming champion – Black Tiger
Date	Winner	Event/Show	Note(s)
February 19	Tiger Mask IV	Acceleration	
May 3	Koji Kanemoto	New Japan Cup 2006 Special	
December 24	Minoru	Battle Xmas! Catch the Victory	

IWGP Junior Heavyweight Tag Team Championship
Incoming champions – Hirooki Goto and Minoru
Date	Winner	Event/Show	Note(s)
February 19	El Samurai and Ryusuke Taguchi	Circuit 2006 Acceleration	
July 8	Gedo and Jado	Circuit 2006 Turbulence	

=== TNA ===
TNA X Division Championship
Incoming champion – Samoa Joe
Date	Winner	Event/Show	Note(s)
March 12	Christopher Daniels	Destination X	
April 10	Samoa Joe	Impact!	
June 19	Senshi	Impact!	
October 22	Chris Sabin	Bound for Glory	
October 24	A.J. Styles	Impact!	
November 6	Christopher Daniels	Impact!	

=== WWE ===
– Raw
– SmackDown!
- ECW

Raw and SmackDown each had a world championship, a secondary championship, and a tag team championship for male wrestlers. ECW only had a world championship. SmackDown also had a title for their cruiserweight wrestlers. There was only one women's championship and it was exclusive to Raw.

WWE Championship
Incoming champion – John Cena
Date	Winner	Event/Show	Note(s)
January 8	Edge	New Year's Revolution	Cashed in his Money in the Bank contract from WrestleMania 21 immediately after John Cena won an Elimination Chamber match
January 29	John Cena	Royal Rumble	
June 11	Rob Van Dam	ECW One Night Stand	Cashed in his Money in the Bank contract from WrestleMania 22. This was an Extreme Rules match. Van Dam was then awarded the reinstated ECW World Heavyweight Championship for the new ECW brand
The title became property of the new ECW brand due to Rob Van Dam joining the ECW roster.
July 3	Edge	Monday Night Raw	Triple threat match, also involving John Cena
The title became exclusive to the Raw brand due to Edge being a member of the Raw roster.
September 17	John Cena	Unforgiven	Tables, Ladders, and Chairs match

World Heavyweight Championship
Incoming champion – Batista
Date	Winner	Event/Show	Note(s)
January 10 (aired January 13)	Vacated	SmackDown!	Batista vacated the title after he was sidelined with a legit triceps injury.
January 10 (aired January 13)	Kurt Angle	SmackDown!	20-man battle royal for the vacant title.
April 2	Rey Mysterio	WrestleMania 22	Triple threat match, also involving Randy Orton. The championship was referred to as the "World Championship", due to Mysterio not being a heavyweight
July 23	King Booker	The Great American Bash	
November 26	Batista	Survivor Series	Last Chance match

ECW World Heavyweight Championship
(Title reactivated)
Date	Winner	Event/Show	Note(s)
June 13	Rob Van Dam	ECW	The title was revived by WWE for the new ECW brand. Van Dam was awarded the title by Paul Heyman for winning the WWE Championship at ECW One Night Stand.
July 4	Big Show	ECW	Extreme Rules match
December 3	Bobby Lashley	December to Dismember	Extreme Elimination Chamber match, also involving Rob Van Dam, Hardcore Holly, Test, and CM Punk

WWE Intercontinental Championship
Incoming champion – Ric Flair
Date	Winner	Event/Show	Note(s)
February 20	Shelton Benjamin	Monday Night Raw	
April 30	Rob Van Dam	Backlash	Title for contract match, where Van Dam also defended his Money in the Bank contract
May 15	Shelton Benjamin	Monday Night Raw	3-on-2 handicap Texas tornado match, featuring Benjamin, Chris Masters, and Triple H against WWE Champion John Cena and Rob Van Dam, in which anyone who beat Cena or Van Dam would win their respective title; Benjamin pinned Van Dam
June 25	Johnny Nitro	Vengeance	Triple threat match, also involving Carlito
October 2	Jeff Hardy	Monday Night Raw	
November 6	Johnny Nitro	Monday Night Raw	No disqualification match
November 13	Jeff Hardy	Monday Night Raw	

WWE United States Championship
Incoming champion – Vacant
Date	Winner	Event/Show	Note(s)
January 10 (aired January 13)	Booker T	SmackDown!	Best of Seven series against Chris Benoit. After winning the first three matches, Randy Orton substituted for Booker T due to injury, losing the next three matches, but winning the final for the vacant title.
February 19	Chris Benoit	No Way Out	
April 2	John "Bradshaw" Layfield	WrestleMania 22	
May 23 (aired May 26)	Bobby Lashley	SmackDown!	
July 11 (aired July 14)	Finlay	SmackDown!	
August 29 (aired September 1)	Mr. Kennedy	SmackDown!	Triple threat match, also involving Bobby Lashley.
October 10 (aired October 13)	Chris Benoit	SmackDown!	

WWE Women's Championship
Incoming champion – Trish Stratus
Date	Winner	Event/Show	Note(s)
April 2	Mickie James	WrestleMania 22	
August 14	Lita	Monday Night Raw	
September 17	Trish Stratus	Unforgiven	Trish Stratus' retirement match
September 18	Vacated	Monday Night Raw	Vacated due to Trish Stratus' retirement
November 5	Lita	Cyber Sunday	Lumberjill match. Lita defeated Mickie James in a tournament final
November 26	Mickie James	Survivor Series	Lita's retirement match

World Tag Team Championship
Incoming champions – Kane and Big Show
Date	Winner	Event/Show	Note(s)
April 3	The Spirit Squad (Johnny, Kenny, Mikey, Mitch, and Nicky)	Monday Night Raw	Kenny and Mikey won the match, but all five members were recognized as champions under the Freebird Rule.
November 5	Ric Flair and Roddy Piper	Cyber Sunday	Piper was voted into this match via web poll. Kenny and Mikey represented The Spirit Squad.
November 13	Rated-RKO (Edge and Randy Orton)	Monday Night Raw	

WWE Tag Team Championship
Incoming champions – MNM (Joey Mercury and Johnny Nitro)
Date	Winner	Event/Show	Note(s)
May 21	Paul London and Brian Kendrick	Judgment Day	

WWE Cruiserweight Championship
Incoming champion – Kid Kash
Date	Winner	Event/Show	Note(s)
January 29	Gregory Helms	Royal Rumble	Six-way match, also involving Funaki, Jamie Noble, Nunzio, and Paul London. Helms transferred from Raw to SmackDown! after winning the title

== Debuts ==
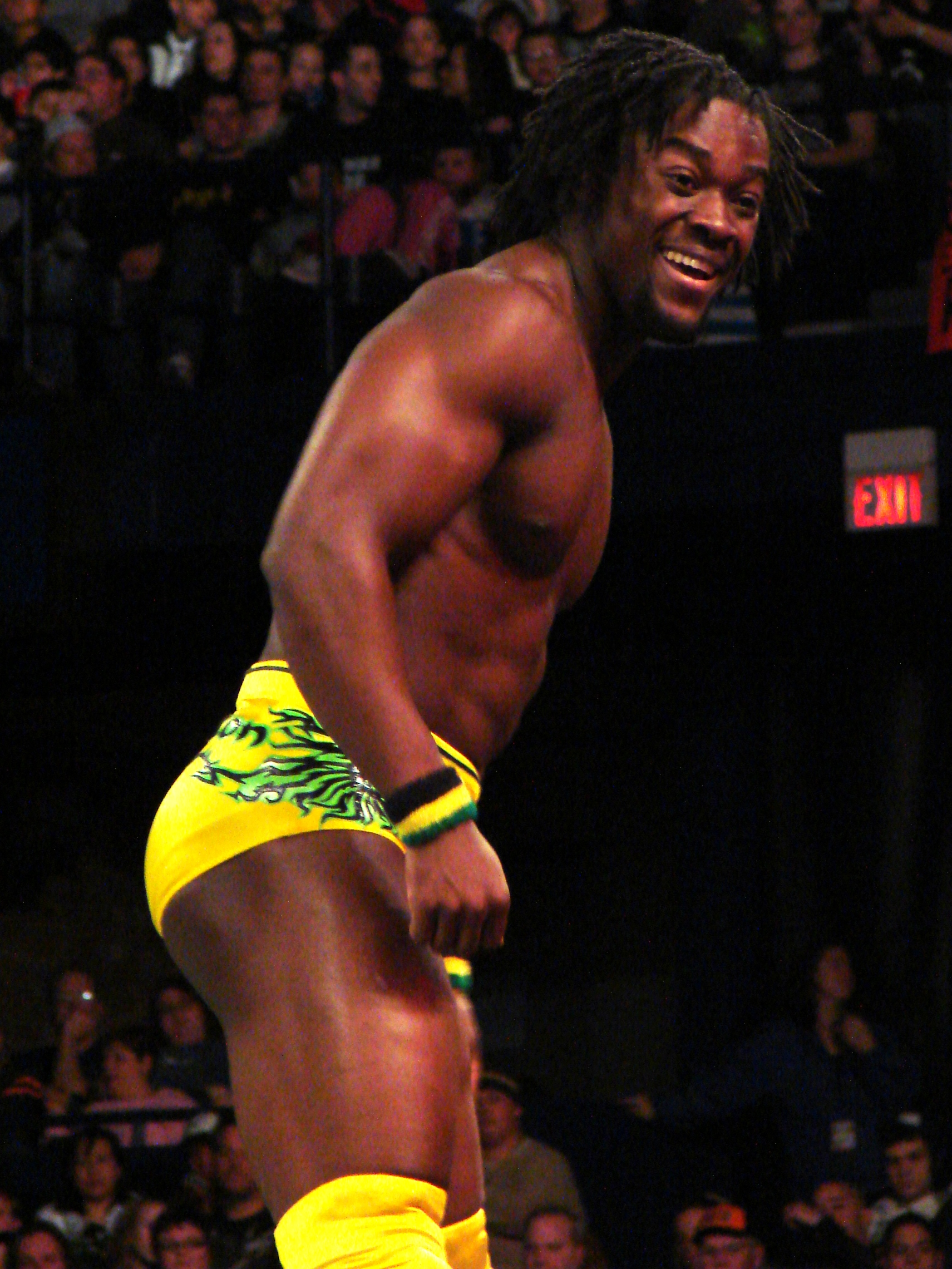
Kofi Kingston

- January 3 - Arisa Nakajima
- January 6 – Mike Bailey
- February 24 – Kofi Kingston
- March 4 – Tomomitsu Matsunaga
- April 7 – Vladimir Kozlov
- May 26 – Hiro Tonai
- May 27 – Tetsuya Naito
- May 28 - JD McDonagh
- May 29 - Riho
- June 4 - SEINA
- June 13 – Kelly Kelly
- June 16 - Cody Rhodes
- June 18 – Yusuke Kubo
- July 1 – Victoria Crawford
- July 9 - Hiren and Tyrannosaurus Okuda
- July 16 – Hanako Nakamori
- July 17 – Kaji Tomato
- July 29 – Iestyn Rees
- August 8 – Gota Ihashi
- August 16 – Layla El
- August 24 – Maryse
- October 28 – Ultimate Spider Jr.
- November
  - Rosa Mendes
  - Brooke/Miss Tessmacher
- November 12 - Ethan Page
- December 24 - Asuka Oki

== Retirements ==
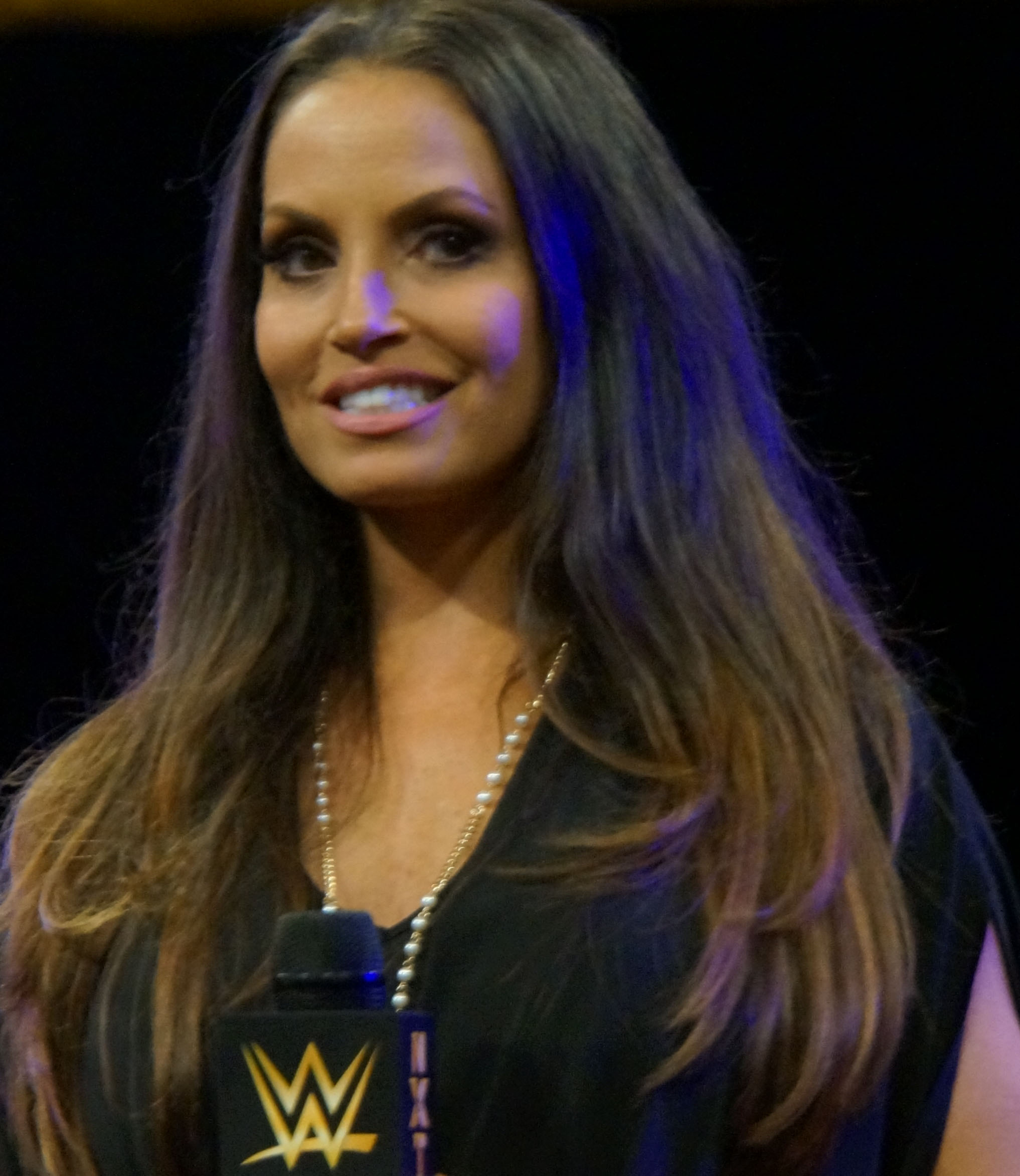
Trish Stratus

- Ivory (1986–2006)
- Lex Luger (1985-2006)
- Mo (1991–2006) (first retirement, returned in 2014)
- Marc Mero (1990-2006)
- Mikey Batts (June 20, 2003 - June 14, 2006)
- Sean O'Haire (June 26, 2000 – June 28, 2006)
- Stacy Keibler (1999 – July 2006)
- Jackie Fargo (1950-September 16, 2006)
- Luther Reigns (1997 -September 16, 2006)
- Trish Stratus (March 19, 2000 – September 17, 2006) (brief return in 2011, 2018, Evolution and 2019)
- Lita (1999 – November 26, 2006) (occasional wrestler)

== Births ==
- March 30 – Senka Akatsuki
- November 13 – Seri Yamaoka
- December 28
  - Hina
  - Rina

== Deaths ==
- January 15 - Ricky Romero, 74
- January 16 – El Texano, 47
- January 28 –
  - Black Cat, 51
  - Emory Hale, 36
- February 11 - Jackie Pallo, 80
- February 16 - Johnny Grunge, 36
- April 2 - Víctor Quiñones, 46
- April 27 - Kay Noble, 65
- May 2 - Sam Steamboat, 71
- May 26 - Grigory Verichev, 49
- May 27 – Apache Bull Ramos, 68
- June 7 – Earthquake, 42
- June 23 - Luke Graham, 66
- June 25 - Harry Elliott, 101
- July 16 – Bob Orton, 76
- August 3 - Jim LaRock, 81
- September 15 - Ricky Gibson, 53
- October 5 – Antonio Peña, 55
- October 15 - Joey Maggs, 39
- October 26 - Kintarō Ōki, 77
- October 28 - Trevor Berbick, 52
- October 31 - Huracán Ramírez, 80
- November 3 - Sputnik Monroe, 77
- November 12 - Angel Maravilla, 72
- November 13 - Tiger Conway Sr., 74
- December 16 – Don Jardine, 66

== See also ==
- List of TNA pay-per-view events
- List of WWE pay-per-view events
