= Joey Styles =

American professional wrestling announcer

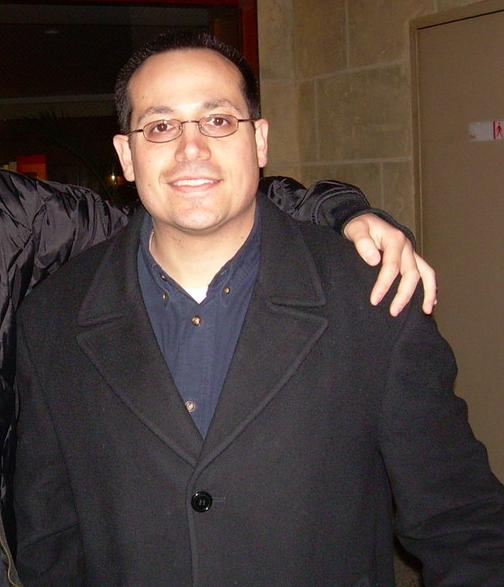
- Styles in 2007

Personal information
- Born: Joseph Carmine Bonsignore; July 14, 1971 (age 55) New York City, U.S.

Professional wrestling career
- Ring name: Joey Styles
- Billed height: 5 ft 7 in (1.70 m)
- Billed weight: 170 lb (77 kg)
- Debut: 1992
- Retired: 2016

Joseph Carmine Bonsignore (born July 14, 1971) better known by his ring name Joey Styles, is an American former professional wrestling commentator. He is best known for his time with ECW and WWE. Before working for WWE, Styles was a full-time professional in the field of print advertising sales in New York City. He started selling digital advertising with WWE and is now selling digital advertising full-time in New York City.

== Early life ==
Bonsignore's family moved from The Bronx to Connecticut when he was in middle school, where he still resides. He is of Italian descent.

Bonsignore chose to attend Hofstra University over other schools because they had a strong communications program with their own television studio and station, and because the Long Island, New York campus was close to Pro Wrestling Illustrated's offices. He hoped to get an internship at Pro Wrestling Illustrated, which he eventually did. That internship got him backstage at a World Championship Wrestling show where he first met Paul Heyman, his future employer.

Later, Heyman visited the offices of Pro Wrestling Illustrated and Bonsignore showed him a tape of his announcing with the North American Wrestling Alliance. That led to Heyman hiring Styles for ECW when he graduated from Hofstra in 1993.

== Career ==
=== North American Wrestling Alliance (1992–1993) ===
Joey Styles got his start in professional wrestling announcing while still attending Hofstra University by working for Tony Capone's North American Wrestling Alliance. He would often split time with former WWE announcer Craig DeGeorge or join DeGeorge for a two-man commentary team. Styles would also host a segment called "NAWA Superstar Stats" where he would talk about the wrestlers and their accomplishments. The NAWA aired on Sportschannel America (now NBC Sports Network through mergers and acquisitions) for a brief time.

Towards the end of this period, Styles was credited as author of a column in Wrestling 93: Rulebreaker, a quarterly wrestling magazine and sister publication of Pro Wrestling Illustrated, supportive of heels.

=== Eastern/Extreme Championship Wrestling (1993–2001) ===
Styles is best known for his work in Extreme Championship Wrestling (ECW) during its entire run, from 1993 to its 2001 bankruptcy. He debuted at the Super Summer Sizzler Spectacular show in Philadelphia, Pennsylvania on June 19, 1993. Styles was the sole host of ECW Hardcore TV and spent the early portion of the run as the promotion's only announcer. Providing both play-by-play and color commentary during television and pay-per-view broadcasts, Styles added his wrestling knowledge, enthusiasm, and comedic timing to the program. He briefly left ECW in 1994 only to return a few weeks later.

At Barely Legal, he became the first and only wrestling announcer in history to call a live pay-per-view event solo. Later on in the promotion, he was joined on commentary by Rick Rude on Hardcore TV, Joel Gertner for ECW on TNN, and later Cyrus for pay-per-views. Styles also worked full-time in ad sales for News America Marketing, a division of News Corp in New York City.

After ECW, Styles briefly appeared in XPW but quit after one show, returning all checks that he had been paid.

=== Major League Wrestling (2002–2003) ===
After a brief sabbatical from the wrestling industry, Joey Styles would return to wrestling announcing for Court Bauer's Major League Wrestling as the "voice of MLW." Styles' return to wrestling would be heralded as he was one of the first names to be announced by the company during its 2002 launch. Initially calling the action for MLW's home video releases, Styles's presence would grow upon MLW inking a major television pact with Sun Sports and several other international distributors. Hosting the weekly 11 pm series, MLW Underground, Styles returned to his roots in the booth as a solo broadcaster, praised for his calling of memorable matches including a barbed wire match between Terry Funk and Steve Corino, amongst others. Styles continued in advertising sales full-time.

=== World Wrestling Entertainment/WWE ===
==== ECW One Night Stand (2005) ====
Styles signed a one night deal with World Wrestling Entertainment (WWE) to call the first-ever ECW One Night Stand event, where he and Mick Foley did commentary for the show. He hosted and announced Hardcore Homecoming two nights earlier from the former ECW Arena in Philadelphia. The sold-out event featured former ECW stars Shane Douglas, The Sandman, Sabu, Terry Funk, Raven, The Blue Meanie, Mikey Whipwreck, Jerry Lynn, New Jack, 2 Cold Scorpio and more.

==== Raw and ECW (2005–2008) ====
On November 1, 2005, he made an appearance at WWE's Taboo Tuesday. Styles was brought in to fill-in for Jonathan Coachman, as Coachman had a match against Batista. Styles joined WWE's Raw as a play-by-play announcer on November 7. On December 4, 2005, it was confirmed by WWE.com that Styles signed a five-year contract to be the official play-by-play commentator for Raw. This would be the first time in Styles' career that he would work in wrestling full-time.

In an earlier interview done by WWE.com, he mentioned that becoming the voice of Raw was a childhood dream come true. Styles also stated that calling WrestleMania was one of his lifelong dreams growing up. However, despite being the lead announcer for Raw, it was announced that he would not provide commentary for WrestleMania 22, which instead featured Jim Ross calling the matches for Raw. Styles learned that he would not be announcing at WrestleMania 22 when he arrived on Raw on March 27, 2006. The reason for Styles not calling the event is that Vince McMahon disliked pure play-by-play announcing and wanted a "storyteller" instead.

Jim Ross had a similar problem when he first joined WWE, and Styles has credited Ross for teaching him the WWE style of commentary upon his return. However, Styles was present at WrestleMania 22, losing his "WrestleMania virginity" as he put it, calling the Hardcore Match between Mick Foley and Edge. This was Styles' idea, as he wanted to achieve his lifelong dream of calling a match at WrestleMania and pitched the idea to Vince McMahon by explaining that he had called more Hardcore/ECW style matches than any other announcer in history.

On the May 1, 2006 edition of Raw, Styles announced that he was quitting by delivering a worked shoot promo, in which he bashed Vince McMahon, WWE, sports entertainment, and the fact that people "buy into this crap". To further the storyline, his profile was removed from both the Raw superstars section and the ECW One Night Stand subsite. Styles remained under contract with WWE after he quit Raw; however, making his next appearance at WWE vs. ECW Head-to-Head. Here, he provided commentary with Tazz and announced that (now former ECW Representative) Paul Heyman had reinstated him as commentator of the new ECW brand of WWE. He provided commentary for ECW One Night Stand 2006 on June 11 and went on to announce ECW's weekly show on Sci-Fi Channel. In April 2008, Styles began working on WWE.com, with Mike Adamle replacing him as ECW's play by play commentator. He stated repeatedly that he had retired from announcing full-time and was thrilled to continue to work for WWE as Director of Digital Media Content. Styles was soon after promoted to Vice President of Digital Media Content.

==== WWE Digital Media (2008–2016) ====
As Vice President of Digital Media Content, Styles worked on WWE.com and the WWE app, writing and editing as well as working closely with WWE's sales and sponsorship division. Additionally, Styles hosted a show called Oh My God! Moment of the Week that ran from September 2008 to December 2008. On the December 8, 2008 episode of Raw, Styles presented the "O M G!" Moment of the Year award at the 2008 Slammy Awards with Alicia Fox, saying his famous "Oh My God!" catchphrase.

In 2010, Styles' announcing contract expired, but he remained with WWE as a non-contracted employee and continued to host "History of ECW" on WWE Classics On Demand TV service until it was discontinued in January 2014 because of the launch of WWE Network. Episodes of ECW Hardcore TV which aired in syndication from 1993 to 2000 and was hosted and announced by Styles are available on WWE Network along with all ECW pay-per-views. Due to music licensing issues, some of the commentary by Styles from ECW pay-per-views on the WWE Network has been re-recorded by Styles. Styles continued to host the ECW Unreleased WWE home video series. On November 11, 2014, Styles and Paul Heyman hosted WWE Network special ECW Exposed.

Styles appeared in WWE 2K16, announcing an ECW match between Steve Austin and Mikey Whipwreck in the Austin 3:16 showcase.

On August 8, 2016, it was reported that Styles was released from WWE and returned to advertising sales in New York City.

=== YESNetwork.com (2012) ===
In addition to his duties on WWE.com, during the 2012 baseball season, Styles hosted a weekly webcast called "Pinstripe Plays of the Week" on YES Network.com, where he would give a recap of the best weekly plays from the New York Yankees.

=== Independent circuit (2016) ===
From September 2 to 4, 2016, Styles provided commentary for the Chikara promotion's 2016 King of Trios tournament.

After his release from WWE, Styles went on record as saying he wanted "to be the Voice of the Indies" while still working full-time in advertising sales.

On November 12, 2016, Styles took part in Evolve's Evolve 72 event. Before the main event of the show, Styles made a joke involving Donald Trump and announcer Joanna Rose, stating Trump "would like to grab her by the...", without saying the word "pussy". Evolve's booker Gabe Sapolsky immediately apologized for the comment, before announcing that Evolve had terminated Styles. Two days later, Beyond Wrestling and Chikara also announced they were severing ties with Styles. After that incident, Styles retired from pro wrestling.

== Awards and accomplishments ==
- Wrestling Observer Newsletter awards

- Best Television Announcer (1994–1996)
