= WWE ECW =

Professional wrestling television program

- Created by: Vince McMahon; Paul Heyman
- Starring: ECW roster
- Opening theme: "Bodies" by Drowning Pool and "This Is Extreme!" by Harry Slash & The Slashtones (2006–2007) "Don't Question My Heart" by Saliva featuring Brent Smith (2007–2010)
- Country of origin: United States
- No. of seasons: 5
- No. of episodes: 193

Production
- Production locations: Various Arenas and Sports venues
- Camera setup: Multicamera setup
- Running time: 46 minutes
- Production company: WWE

Original release
- Network: Sci-Fi/Syfy
- Release: June 13, 2006 – February 16, 2010

WWE ECW (officially known as simply ECW and colloquially known as ECW on Sci-Fi or ECW on Syfy, and WWECW, a portmanteau of both "WWE" and "ECW") is an American professional wrestling television program that was produced by WWE. It aired between June 13, 2006 and February 16, 2010 on Sci-Fi/Syfy. The show was based on the major hardcore independent Extreme Championship Wrestling (ECW) promotion that had closed down in 2001, and the name also referred to the ECW brand, in which WWE employees were assigned to work and perform, complementary to WWE's other brands, Raw and SmackDown.

Throughout the shows existence, ECW had been broadcast from over 120 arenas, over 80 cities and towns, primarily in the United States but also in Canada, Italy, and the United Kingdom. WWE folded the show and the ECW brand overall in 2010, and replaced it the following week on-air with WWE NXT.

== Show history ==
=== Launch on Sci Fi ===
WWE acquired the rights to Extreme Championship Wrestling (ECW)'s trademarks and video library in January 2003 and later began reintroducing ECW through content from the ECW library and a series of books, which included the release of The Rise and Fall of ECW documentary. The enormous popularity of ECW merchandise prompted WWE to organize ECW One Night Stand, an ECW reunion pay-per-view in 2005. The financial and critical success of the event motivated WWE to organize a second ECW One Night Stand the following year. With rejuvenated interest in the ECW product, WWE began exploring the possibility of reviving the promotion full-time. The news that WWE was planning to bring back ECW was leaked in the middle of April as Vince McMahon decided to revive ECW as a full-time brand. Reports beforehand stated that WWE was prepared to bring back ECW immediately after WrestleMania 22.

On May 25, 2006, WWE announced the launch of ECW as a stand-alone brand, congruous to Raw and SmackDown!, with its own show on Sci Fi (now Syfy). Despite initial concerns that professional wrestling would not be accepted by Sci Fi's demographic, network President Bonnie Hammer stated that she believed ECW would fit the channel's theme of "stretching the imagination". Sci Fi (now known as Syfy) is owned by NBC Universal, parent company of USA Network and exclusive cable broadcaster of Raw. ECW's weekly series was originally given a thirteen episode run as a "summer series" on Sci Fi. The premiere received a 2.79 rating, making it the highest rated show on cable in its time slot. Because of its good ratings it was granted an extended run through the end of 2007. On October 23, 2007, the network renewed the series through 2008. Prior to the show's launch, WWE opted to cancel its webcast Velocity and replace it with the new ECW program.

==== Original format (2006) ====
ECW was initially produced differently from WWE's other shows. For televised events, the main ring-facing cameras were placed on a different location in the arena while the wrestling ring itself featured an ECW logo on the mat and blank turnbuckle covers. The male performers were referred to "Extremists" instead of "Superstars" while female performers were called "Vixens" rather than Divas. However, the show steadily began being produced following the same format of the other shows. As opposed to the original promotion, match rules, such as count outs and disqualifications, were now standard. Matches featuring the rule set of the original promotion were then classified as being contested under "Extreme Rules" and were only fought when specified.

Former ECW owner Paul Heyman served as the on-air "ECW Representative" (a reference to how Heyman had been identified on Monday Night Raw back in 1997). According to an interview in the UK newspaper The Sun, Heyman wrote the show's weekly scripts and submitted them to writers for possible changes, and then Vince McMahon for final approval. Following December to Dismember, Heyman was relieved from both his on and off-air duties with World Wrestling Entertainment.

==== Change in format (2007–2010) ====
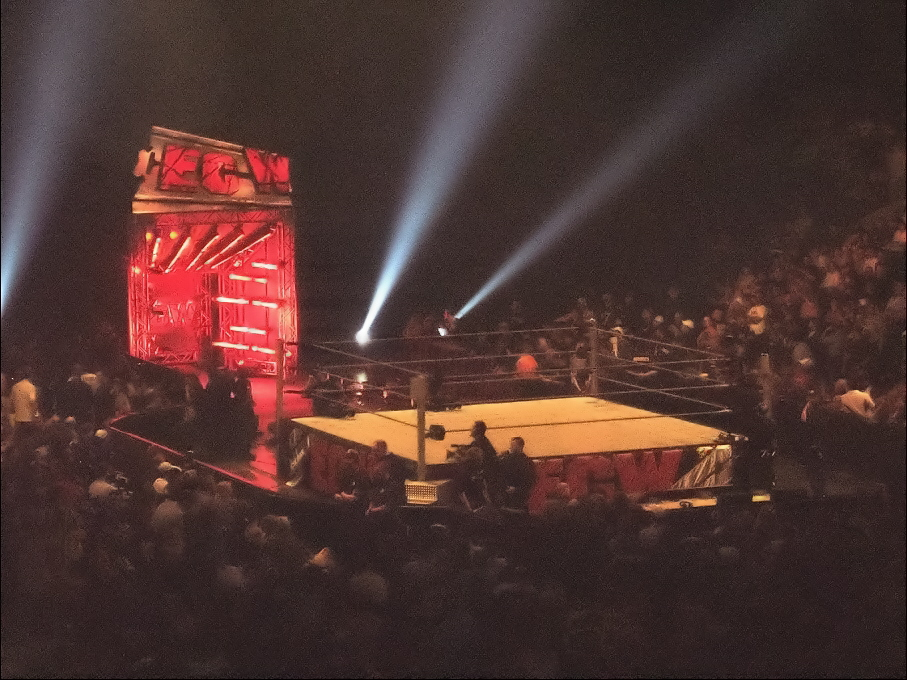
The ECW set used from October 31, 2006-January 15, 2008.

While the show started out a ratings success, it began drawing criticism from fans of the original ECW early on. This was most evident by the negative crowd reaction "old school" fans gave the main event of Batista vs. Big Show at the August 1, 2006 show from Hammerstein Ballroom, which often held original ECW events while it was a company. After Heyman left in late 2006, there was no ECW authority figure until August 14, 2007, when Armando Estrada was announced as the General Manager.

On May 6, 2008, ECW celebrated its 100th episode on Sci Fi. On June 3, 2008 Estrada was replaced by Theodore Long (who quit his role as assistant general manager of SmackDown a couple weeks earlier) as General Manager of ECW. ECW moved to 9:00 p.m. Eastern/8:00 p.m. Central on September 30, 2008. ECW moved back to 10:00 p.m. Eastern/9:00 p.m. Central on May 5, 2009. On the April 7 edition of ECW it was announced that Theodore Long was returning to SmackDown to fulfill the role of General Manager. From this point the Interim General Manager was named as Tiffany who took over as full-time General Manager on the June 30, 2009 episode. On July 7, 2009, the Sci Fi Channel renamed itself to "Syfy", prompting WWE to rename the show ECW on Syfy to reflect the changes. In 2009 a "superstar initiative" was established for the purpose of introducing new talent to WWE programming, mainly those from WWE's developmental territory Florida Championship Wrestling to ECW's roster.

==== Cancellation and aftermath ====
On February 2, 2010, WWE Chairman Vince McMahon announced that ECW would be going off the air and would be replaced with a new weekly program in its slot in which McMahon announced as "groundbreaking, original show." It was later announced that the show would air its final episode on February 16, 2010. On the February 9, 2010 episode of ECW, the new show's name was announced as WWE NXT.

=== Online presence ===
At ECW's launch, WWE.com introduced Hardcore Hangover, a video feature which allowed fans in the United States and Canada to stream or download video footage from the weekly show. On October 16, 2007, it was replaced by a new feature which made full episodes of the show available for streaming on WWE.com the day after they aired. After gathering a list of names from fans and conducting an online poll, the feature was named ECW X-Stream on October 31, 2007. Past episodes of ECW were previously viewable on the video streaming website Hulu, which are available on the WWE Network worldwide and Peacock in the United States.

== Production ==
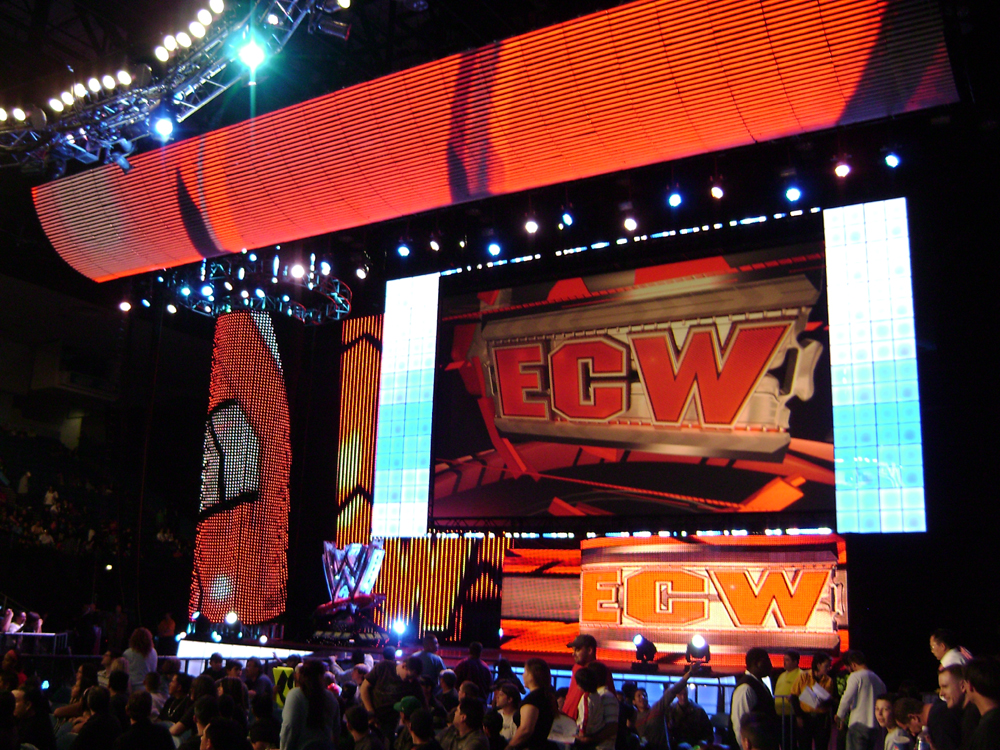
ECW's version of the universal WWE HD set used from January 22, 2008-February 16, 2010.

ECW shows were held in large arenas as a part of the taping schedules of WWE's other shows. This was in sharp contrast to the original Extreme Championship Wrestling which ran most of its events in smaller venues. The show generally aired live on Tuesdays directly before — when touring the west coast — or after SmackDown was taped, though it was also recorded and placed on a broadcast delay until later in the night depending on what circumstances dictated. ECW's in-ring presentation had originally separated itself from WWE, featuring ECW's old black ring ropes, the ECW logo on the center of the ring canvas and no WWE logos on the turnbuckles or ring apron. By 2008, ECW's broadcast presentation mirrored that of a standard WWE show, from camera setup to entrance stage and ring design.

ECW's initial theme song was "Bodies" by Drowning Pool, which had been used by WWE for Extreme Championship Wrestling before the establishment of the brand. "Don't Question My Heart" by Saliva featuring Brent Smith was later used to open ECW for the rest of the program's run. The songs "Famous" by Puddle of Mudd was used for one week, and a censored version of "This Is The New Shit" by Marilyn Manson was used for a few weeks. On January 22, 2008, ECW began broadcasting in HD, along with a new HD set, which is shared among all three WWE brands.

=== Special episodes ===
Episode	Date	Venue	City	Rating	Notes
WWE vs. ECW	June 7, 2006	Nutter Center	Dayton, Ohio	3.1	Special pilot episode
ECW's premiere episode	June 13, 2006	Sovereign Bank Arena	Trenton, New Jersey	2.8	Series debut
ECW Halloween	October 31, 2006	Bradley Center	Milwaukee, Wisconsin		Special Halloween episode of ECW
Best of ECW 2006	December 26, 2006			1.4	Featured clips from 2006
ECW Halloween 2007	October 30, 2007	Nassau Coliseum	Uniondale, New York		Special Halloween episode of ECW
ECW Thanksgiving 2007	November 20, 2007	St. Pete Times Forum	Tampa, Florida		Special Thanksgiving episode of ECW
Thursday Night ECW	December 6, 2007	Florence Civic Center	Florence, South Carolina		Special Thursday night episode of ECW
Best of ECW 2007	December 25, 2007			1.1	Featured clips from 2007
New Year's ECW	January 1, 2008	Richmond Coliseum	Richmond, Virginia		The first ECW episode of 2008
ECW Goes HD	January 22, 2008	John Paul Jones Arena	Charlottesville, Virginia		The first ever ECW episode in HD
100th episode	May 6, 2008	John Labatt Centre	London, Ontario, Canada	1.0	Celebrated the show's 100th episode
Move to 9pm/8c	September 30, 2008	Resch Center	Green Bay, Wisconsin		ECW moves to 9pm/8c
ECW Halloween 2008	October 28, 2008	San Diego Sports Arena	San Diego, California		Special Halloween episode of ECW
ECW Thanksgiving 2008	November 25, 2008	Dunkin' Donuts Center	Providence, Rhode Island		Special Thanksgiving episode of ECW
Best of ECW 2008	December 23, 2008			1.2	Featured clips from 2008
ECW St. Patrick's Day	March 17, 2009	AT&T Center	San Antonio, Texas		Special St. Patrick's Day episode of ECW
ECW returns to 10pm/9c	May 5, 2009	Mellon Arena	Pittsburgh, Pennsylvania		ECW returns to its regular time at 10pm/9c
Thursday Night ECW 2009	July 9, 2009	Rabobank Arena	Bakersfield, California		Special Thursday night episode of ECW
ECW Thanksgiving 2009	November 24, 2009	Arena at Harbor Yard	Bridgeport, Connecticut		Special Thanksgiving episode of ECW
ECW Homecoming	December 15, 2009	Laredo Entertainment Center	Laredo, Texas		The first ever ECW Homecoming
Best of ECW 2009	December 22, 2009			1.2	Featured clips from 2009
ECW Homecoming Finale	January 12, 2010	Resch Center	Green Bay, Wisconsin		The Finale of ECW Homecoming
Final episode	February 16, 2010	Sprint Center	Kansas City, Missouri	1.14	Series finale

== International broadcasters ==
In addition to being broadcast on Syfy, Mun2, and Universal HD in the United States, ECW was broadcast on a number of channels in many different countries.

Country	Network	Ref
Algeria and The Middle East	Showtime	
Argentina, Brazil, Chile, Costa Rica and Mexico	FX Latin America	
Australia	Fox8	
Bangladesh, India, Pakistan and Nepal	TEN Sports	
Cambodia	MyTV	
Canada	Global TV	
Finland	MTV3 Max	
France	Action	
Germany	Sky Deutschland	
Italy	Sky Italia	
Malaysia	Astro Super Sport	
New Zealand	The Box	
Philippines	Jack TV	
Portugal	SportTV 3	
Singapore	SuperSports	
South Africa	e.tv	
Taiwan	Videoland Max-TV	
United Kingdom and Ireland	Sky Sports 3	

== See also ==
- List of ECW (WWE) alumni
- ECW Hardcore TV
- ECW on TNN
