= ECW One Night Stand (2006) =

World Wrestling Entertainment pay-per-view event

- Promotional poster featuring Rob Van Dam, winning the Money in the Bank ladder match at WrestleMania 22
- Promotion: World Wrestling Entertainment
- Brand: Extreme Championship Wrestling
- Date: June 11, 2006
- City: New York City, New York
- Venue: Hammerstein Ballroom
- Attendance: 2,460
- Buy rate: 304,000

Pay-per-view chronology
← Previous; Judgment Day	Next → Vengeance

One Night Stand chronology
← Previous; 2005	Next → 2007

The 2006 ECW One Night Stand was a professional wrestling pay-per-view (PPV) event produced by World Wrestling Entertainment (WWE) via. its Extreme Championship Wrestling (ECW) brand. It was the second annual One Night Stand and took place on June 11, 2006, at the Hammerstein Ballroom in the Manhattan borough of New York City, New York for a second consecutive year. The event was primarily held as a reunion show for wrestlers from the former Extreme Championship Wrestling (ECW) promotion, the assets of which WWE acquired in 2003, and featured hardcore-based matches.

Like the previous year's event, wrestlers from WWE's Raw and SmackDown! brand divisions also appeared. Just prior to the event, WWE established a third brand dubbed ECW for wrestlers of the former promotion and newer talent. It was in turn WWE's first PPV event to feature the ECW brand.

The main event was Raw's John Cena defending the WWE Championship against ECW's Rob Van Dam in the latter's Money in the Bank cash-in match, which Van Dam won by pinfall after performing a Five-Star Frog Splash following interference from Edge. The predominant match on the undercard was SmackDown's Rey Mysterio defending the World Championship against ECW's Sabu, which ended in a no contest after Sabu executed a Triple Jump DDT on Mysterio through a table on to the floor rendering both men, in kayfabe, unable to continue, with Mysterio retaining the title. Another match on the undercard was the WWE team of Edge, Mick Foley, and Lita versus the ECW team of Terry Funk, Tommy Dreamer, and Beulah McGillicutty in a Hardcore mixed tag team match.

== Production ==
=== Background ===
In June 2005, World Wrestling Entertainment (WWE) held a professional wrestling pay-per-view (PPV) event that was a reunion show for wrestlers of the former Extreme Championship Wrestling (ECW) promotion, the assets of which WWE acquired in 2003. After the success of the event, which was titled ECW One Night Stand, WWE scheduled a second ECW One Night Stand for June 11, 2006, establishing the hardcore-based PPV as an annual show for the promotion. Just like the previous year, the 2006 event was held at the Hammerstein Ballroom in the Manhattan borough of New York City, New York.

The build-up for the 2006 ECW One Night Stand occurred on both Raw and SmackDown! heading into the pay-per-view, but build-up behind the scenes began several months earlier, as WWE was bringing back ECW full-time. The news that WWE was planning to bring back ECW was leaked in the middle of April as Vince McMahon decided to revive the promotion as a third brand alongside Raw and SmackDown!, dubbed ECW. Reports beforehand stated that WWE was prepared to bring back ECW immediately after WrestleMania 22. WWE opted to cancel its webcast Velocity and replace it with the new ECW program. The new brand was officially confirmed by WWE on May 25, 2006, with its debut show airing on June 13 on the Sci Fi Channel. The 2006 ECW One Night Stand was in turn WWE's first PPV to feature the ECW brand.

=== Storylines ===
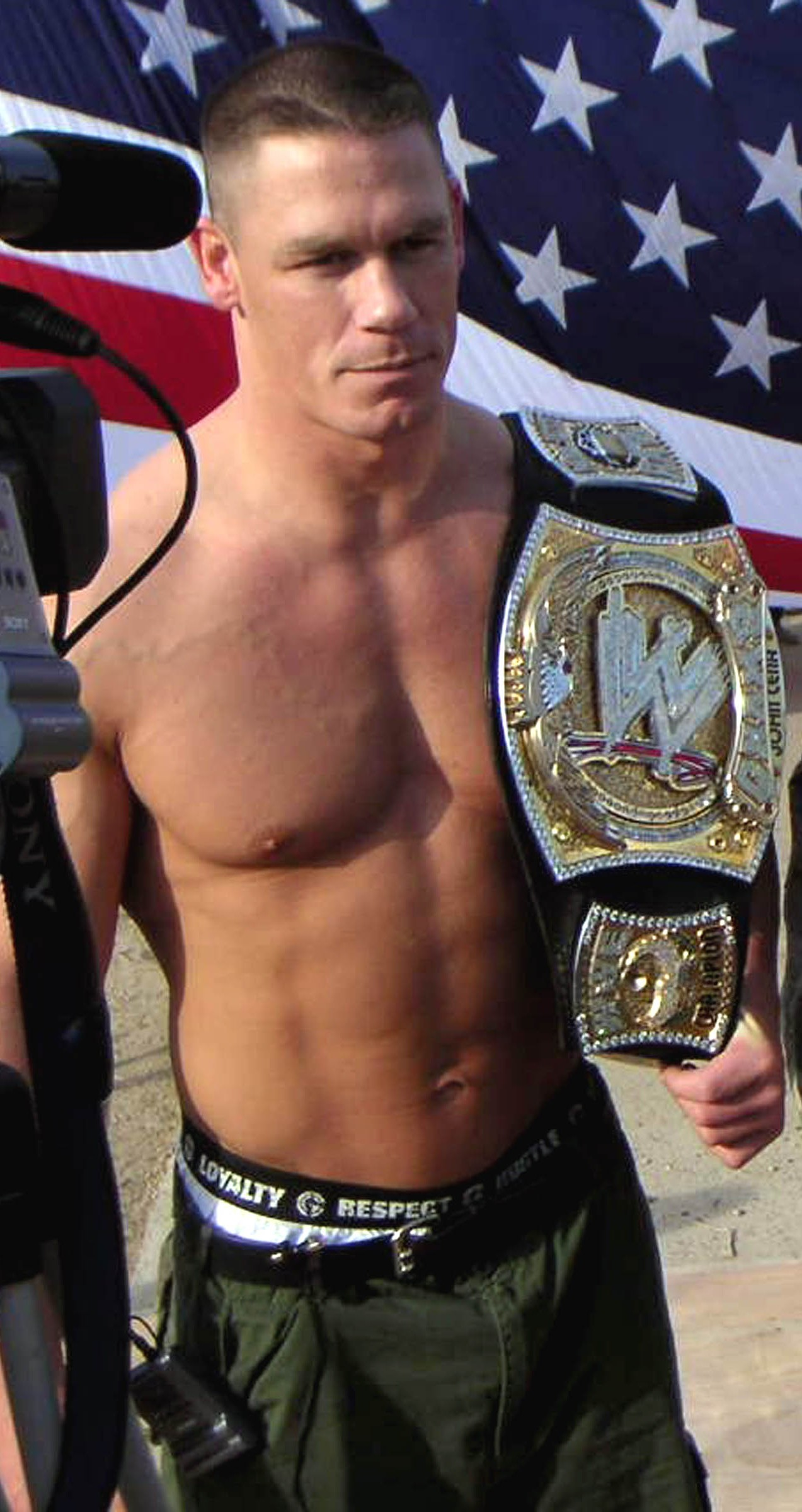
John Cena defended Raw's WWE Championship against Rob Van Dam at One Night Stand.

The main feud heading into One Night Stand was between John Cena and Rob Van Dam over the WWE Championship. At WrestleMania 22, Van Dam competed in a six-man Money in the Bank ladder match, in which Van Dam won and earned the right to face the champion of his choice anytime he wanted to in 12 months. On the May 22 episode of Raw, Van Dam announced that he would be cashing in his opportunity against Cena for the WWE Championship at One Night Stand. The two exchanged lefts and rights with Chris Masters (who Cena had just defeated in a match) also getting involved. The distraction allowed Van Dam to toss his briefcase into Cena's face and then hit him with the Van Daminator. The two had a contract signing for their match on the June 5, 2006 episode of Raw. Before signing the contract, Van Dam told Cena that he would win the WWE Championship at One Night Stand and rename it the ECW World Heavyweight Championship. ECW representative Paul Heyman told Cena that the ECW fans could not wait to boo him out of the Hammerstein Ballroom. Cena signed the contract and wished Van Dam luck. Heyman, however, told Cena that he had brought some people from ECW and at that point, Balls Mahoney, Terry Funk, Tommy Dreamer and the Sandman came to the ring. Cena attempted to fight them off, but Sandman hit Cena with his Singapore cane. ECW's Sabu then came out and sent Cena through the table with his Atomic Arabian Facebuster move. Several Raw superstars ran out to attempt to fight off the ECW Originals. Because of this, a match was booked for the WWE vs. ECW Head-to-Head special that aired on the USA Network on June 7, 2006 between Cena and Sabu. The match ended in a no contest after ECW's newest wrestler, Big Show attacked Cena, sparking a brawl between WWE and ECW wrestlers.

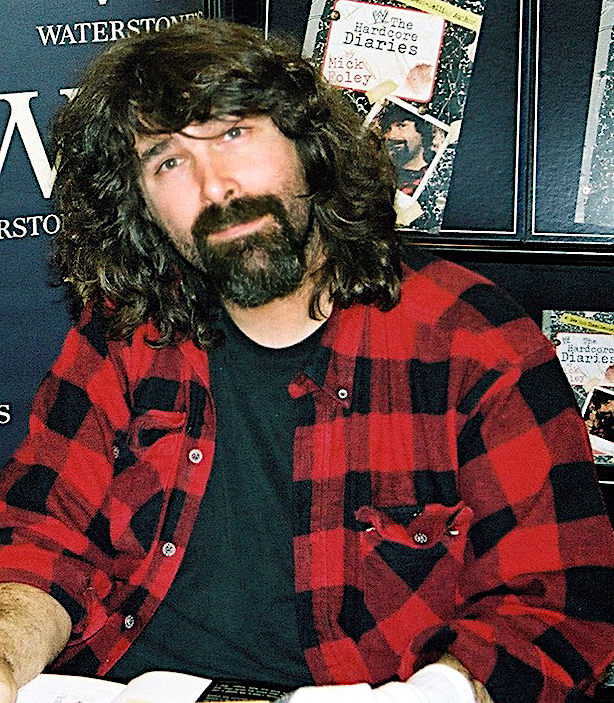
Mick Foley, who teamed up with Edge to take on Tommy Dreamer and Terry Funk at One Night Stand.

The other main match on the card was a Hardcore Intergender match, as Edge and Mick Foley faced Terry Funk and Tommy Dreamer. The rivalry started between Edge and Foley, when the two faced in a Hardcore match at WrestleMania 22. Edge won the match after a spear off the apron and through a flaming table on the outside. Foley was a guest on the Cutting Edge on the May 1, 2006 episode of Raw, and the two agreed to a WrestleMania Hardcore rematch the following week. Before the match began on the May 8, 2006 edition of Raw, Foley announced that the match was now a triple threat match, with Tommy Dreamer added as the third person. During the match, however, Foley turned heel for the first time in over eight years and attacked Dreamer with a barbed wire baseball bat. Foley handed Edge the bat and Edge hit Dreamer with it, busting him open. Foley hit the Mandible claw on Dreamer and Edge simultaneously speared Dreamer, with Foley getting the pinfall. The two, along with Lita celebrated up the entrance ramp. On the May 15, 2006 episode of Raw, Foley wanted to apologize to Dreamer for what happened the previous week; however, Dreamer was not in the arena, so Foley brought out Terry Funk. Funk asked Foley to apologize for what happened to Dreamer. Instead, Foley started bashing ECW. In an attempt to get into a fight with Foley, Funk made comments about Foley's family, calling his wife a whore and his kids bastards. When the two exchanged punches, Edge and Lita came out, with Lita low-blowing Funk. Edge and Foley double-teamed Funk, with Edge hitting Funk with a barbed wire baseball bat. A week later, on the May 22, 2006 edition of Raw, Edge and Foley announced themselves as co-holders of the WWE Hardcore Championship. Paul Heyman came out and made a challenge to Edge and Foley to face Funk and Dreamer at One Night Stand, which Edge accepted. The two, along with Lita, went after Heyman up the ramp, before Dreamer and Funk attacked them with several weapons, sending the trio out of the arena. On the WWE vs. ECW Head to Head special that aired on June 7, 2006, Edge faced Dreamer in an Extreme Rules match. Dreamer hit Edge with a Dreamer Driver through the table. Lita interfered, and hit Dreamer repeatedly with a cane. Dreamer was not hurt by the shots, and he got Lita up for a powerbomb, before Edge speared Dreamer. Edge got the pinfall and won the match. During the match, Foley and Funk were fighting outside the ring, with Funk busting Foley open. After the match, Foley sat in the middle of the ring and stated his kayfabe thoughts on ECW.

Where the hell do any of you get off, telling me I sold out? Where do you get off? Where do you find the nerve, to call me a whore? You think I hate ECW? I love that place. I love that place! But ECW simply didn't love me back. She was like the girl I can't let go off, but the one who makes me sick, upon seeing her. She wanted too much blood, too much of my heart, too much of my life! So I left, and I found fame and fortune in WWE. And Paul Heyman was right. There's only one real difference between me and Tommy Dreamer. I'm a whore, and he's not. You see, seven years ago, I pulled the sock out of my pants, and made Vince McMahon laugh, and the doors of opportunity open wide for Mick Foley, but not for Tommy Dreamer. All he's got is his heart, his pride and the initials ECW. And I wanted to tell Edge that I went back and I watched our WrestleMania match, the greatest hardcore match of all time, I said. Well the truth is, maybe it wasn't quite as good as I thought. Maybe Edge, you and I are gonna have to be tougher than ever, hungrier than ever, sicker than ever, to walk into that steaming cesspool that is the Hammerstein Ballroom. 2,500 sickening, twisted fans, screaming for our blood, because Tommy Dreamer can do everything I can, and maybe with more passion. He's gonna beat us up, all over New York City. He's gonna bludgeon us. Terry Funk, the greatest wrestler I ever saw. You look at Terry Funk and you see an old man, you're not seeing the real Terry Funk. His slaps are worse than most men's punches. His punches dole out concussions, and when he picks up a weapon, he can use it like no man ever has. He has an excruciating pain waking up every single day, looking for one more chance to have one great last match. I blew the son of a bitch up in Japan, and he came back and hugged me. I set him up on fire in Philadelphia, and he put his arm around me. He doesn't put his arm around me anymore. I don't want your arm around me, Terry Funk. Tommy Dreamer, the only difference between me and you, is I have the guts to go to WWE. (At this point, a fan was audibly heard on the telecast telling Foley to shut up.) No, you shut your mouth! (pointing out to said fan) Because when I go to Hammerstein Ballroom, Edge and I are prepared to take the beatings of our lives, and I will do that to exorcise the sick, twisted whore that is ECW. I want her out of my life. You've seen me thrown off cells, you've seen me slammed in tacks, you've seen me go through a burning table at WrestleMania; it is nothing compared to the horrors I will unleash on Dreamer and Funk at (goddamn you) ECW. 'Cause I'm gonna stake the hearts of your heroes, and I'm gonna shove them down their throats for making me fall in love with you to begin with. You stepped on my heart, you stepped on my soul, you took everything I've had faith in, and you just throw it away. And then when I walk to that ring at the Hammerstein Ballroom as a WWE Legend, you Terry Funk and you Tommy Dreamer will learn about loss ... Have a nice day.

— Mick Foley on his kayfabe thoughts on ECW

One of the main undercard matches on the card was between Rey Mysterio and Sabu for SmackDown's World Championship. ECW representative Paul Heyman announced that Mysterio had accepted the challenge for One Night Stand on the June 2, 2006 edition of SmackDown!. Before the June 9, 2006 edition of SmackDown!, Heyman kayfabe revealed to WWE's official website that he was trying to get Mysterio to join the new ECW brand. Mysterio turned down Heyman's offer on the June 9, 2006 edition of SmackDown!. In the main event on that edition of SmackDown!, Mysterio faced Finlay. Mysterio was about to 619 Finlay, when Sabu, who was holding a steel chair, climbed onto the ring apron. Mysterio dropkicked the chair into Sabu, which distracted the referee. This allowed Finlay to hit Mysterio with his shillelagh, and the Celtic Cross for the victory. After the contest, Sabu set up a table on the outside of the ring, and hit Mysterio with a springboard legdrop that sent Mysterio through the table.

== Event ==
Other on-screen personnel
Role:	Name:
Commentators	Joey Styles
Commentators	Tazz
Spanish commentators	Carlos Cabrera
Spanish commentators	Hugo Savinovich
Ring announcer	Stephen DeAngelis
Referees	John Finnegan
Referees	Jim Molineaux
Referees	Mike Posey
Referees	Mike Kehner
Referees	Nick Patrick

Joey Styles and Tazz served as commentators, while Stephen DeAngelis served as ring announcer for the event.

Paul Heyman began the event as it aired on pay-per-view, coming to the ring to "ECW" chants. Heyman stated that "this [ECW's resurrection] didn't happen because of me and it didn't happen because of Vince McMahon. This happened because of you [the fans]. And on behalf of every single one of us, from the bottom of my heart, thank you, thank you, thank you!"

The first match on the card was a match between ECW Original Tazz and WWE Raw commentator Jerry Lawler. This would be Tazz's final match in his career. On the way to the ring, Lawler slapped ECW commentator Joey Styles in the face. Tazz won after 35 seconds by making Lawler pass out to the Tazzmission. After the match, Tazz joined Joey Styles on commentary for the rest of the show.

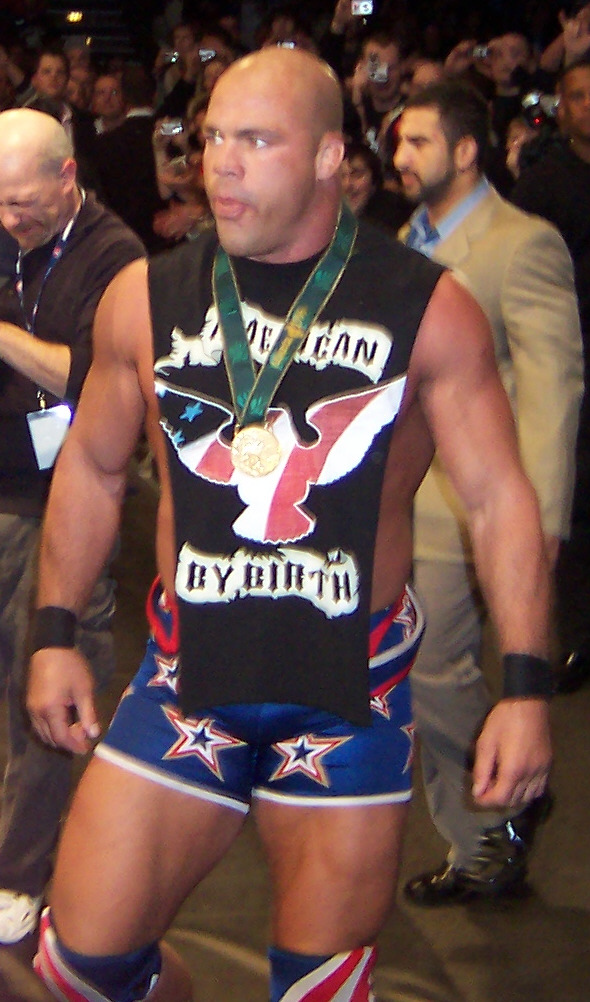
ECW's Kurt Angle faced Raw's Randy Orton.

In the second match ECW's Kurt Angle faced Raw's Randy Orton. Despite Angle's participation as an anti-ECW crusader from last year's One Night Stand, he was met with raucous cheers from the ECW faithful. Randy Orton, by contrast, received an overwhelmingly negative reaction from the fans in attendance, and was subjected throughout the match to several derogatory chants including "Go fuck Cena" and "Orton's a homo." Orton gained the main advantage in the match after Angle missed a running shoulder tackle, which sent him into the ringpost. The crowd inside the Hammerstein Ballroom chanted "Boring!" as Orton applied a rear choke on Angle. Angle executed a series of German suplexes, before executing an Angle Slam for a near-fall. Orton attempted an RKO, but Angle countered, locking on the ankle lock. Orton submitted, giving Angle the victory.

The Full Blooded Italians (Little Guido Maritato and Tony Mamaluke) versus Super Crazy and Tajiri was next. After Guido propelled Crazy into the crowd, Guido and Mamaluke executed the muscle buster on Tajiri for the victory. After the contest, Big Show entered the ring and executed the cobra clutch backbreaker on Mamaluke and kicked F.B.I.'s enforcer Big Guido in the head.

John "Bradshaw" Layfield (JBL) made a surprise appearance, cutting a promo. Just over a week earlier, he announced on his radio show that he was not going to return to professional wrestling. JBL recalled his (legitimate) assault on The Blue Meanie from ECW One Night Stand 2005 and referred to himself as "The King of Hardcore". He announced that he was replacing Tazz as the color commentator of SmackDown!.

Rey Mysterio versus Sabu was next in an Extreme Rules match with SmackDown!'s World Championship on the line, held by Mysterio. The match started with several chair shots from both competitors. Sabu had the upper hand for most of the match, executing an Arabian facebuster and a triple jump moonsault, but Mysterio kicked out of both moves. Mysterio regained the upper hand, as he executed a seated senton that sent both men through a table at ringside. Sabu countered a second seated senton attempt, and put Mysterio on a second table at ringside. Sabu proceeded to execute a triple-jump somersault splash, but Mysterio made it to his feet while on the table. This turned the move into a DDT, sending both men through the table at ringside. Although neither men were legitimately hurt, Dr. Ferdinand Rios came out and kayfabe declared that the match could not continue. This meant that Mysterio retained the World Championship.

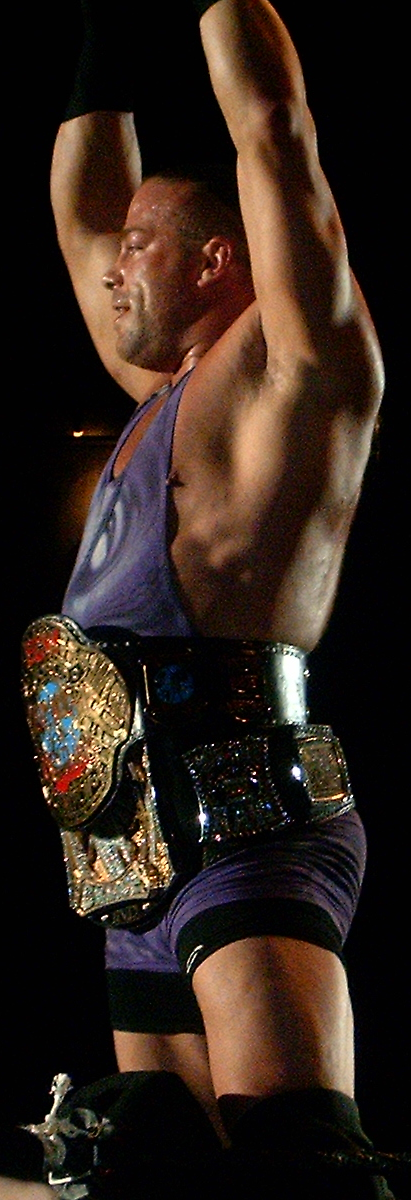
ECW's Rob Van Dam defeated John Cena to win Raw's WWE Championship. After the event, the ECW World Heavyweight Championship was reactivated and awarded to Van Dam, who became a double champion.

Edge and Mick Foley versus Tommy Dreamer and Terry Funk was next in what was a violent and bloody Hardcore Tag Team match. Before the match began, Edge and Foley entered the ring accompanied by Lita, while Dreamer and Funk entered the ring accompanied by Beulah McGillicutty, turning the match into a Hardcore six-person tag-team match. Lita's appearance at the event was received very negatively, with the crowd chanting, "You're a crack whore" and, "She's got herpes" at her. During the course of the match, Foley applied the mandible claw to both Beulah and Dreamer. Halfway through the match, Funk was taken backstage as Foley wrapped barbed wire around his fist and raked it across the forehead and eyes of Funk. A bandaged Funk returned to the match a few minutes later, hitting Edge and Foley with a barbed wire bat. Funk then set the bat on fire and left it at ringside. Funk hit Foley, and Foley fell onto a barbed wire board. Foley's shirt was on fire, but was put out by a ringside attendant. Dreamer and Funk got the upper-hand after Dreamer DDT'd Edge. Dreamer then locked a modified crossface onto Edge, using barbed wire against Edge's face. Lita broke the hold up only to have Dreamer give her the Dreamer Driver. Edge blindsided Dreamer wrapping barbed wire around his head, before dropping him with the inverted DDT. McGillicutty entered the ring to check on Dreamer, but Edge speared McGillicutty and pinned her with a cover that resembled the "legs up" version of the missionary position, humping along with the 3 count.

Balls Mahoney faced Masato Tanaka in the second Extreme Rules match of the night. Mahoney got the early advantage after throwing a beer can in the face of Tanaka. Tanaka gained the advantage after executing a superplex off the top rope. Mahoney won the match after hitting Tanaka with a steel chair. Before the WWE Championship match, Eugene came to the ring to cut a promo. He reminded the fans that he was Eric Bischoff's nephew, before being interrupted by The Sandman. Sandman hit Eugene repeatedly with his Singapore cane, leaving Eugene to run to the back, with The Sandman chasing after him.

In the main event, John Cena defended Raw's WWE Championship against Rob Van Dam in Van Dam's Money in the Bank cash-in match. It was evident that the crowd was decidedly anti-Cena even before the match began; in keeping with his traditional entrance, Cena threw the T-shirt he wore to the ring out into the crowd, only to have it thrown back at him a number of times. Loud, insulting chants were directed at Cena throughout the match, such as "Fuck you Cena," "Same old shit," "Overrated," and "You can't wrestle." The action quickly went to ringside, and Van Dam got the advantage on Cena, with a moonsault press off the steel steps. Van Dam continued his offense when the action went back inside the ring as he placed a chair on Cena's stomach before executing Rolling Thunder. Cena later managed to get the advantage, executing a DDT on a steel chair. Cena went for his finishing move, the FU, but Van Dam blocked the attempt. Van Dam would then set up a table in the corner, but Cena got Van Dam in the STFU. When John Cena refused to break the hold after Van Dam got to the ropes, Cena clotheslined the referee, after they had a push and shove. Cena proceeded to deliver Van Dam a superplex off the top rope and then hit Van Dam with steel steps. Replacement referee Nick Patrick officiated the remainder of the match, with Van Dam kicking out at two. As Cena got up he went to deliver Van Dam an FU, Van Dam grabbed onto the rope, which leads Cena to deliver Van Dam an FU out of the ring. As Cena turned around, someone in a motorcycle helmet interfered and speared Cena through a table. The person was revealed as Edge, who won a number one contender's match to challenge for the WWE Championship at Vengeance on June 25, 2006. Edge also knocked out Nick Patrick. The Hammerstein Ballroom crowd chanted, "Thank you Edge!". Van Dam then executed the Five-Star Frog Splash on Cena, but there was no referee as Patrick was knocked out. Paul Heyman ran to the ring, and counted the pinfall to three, giving Van Dam the victory. Ring announcer Stephen DeAngelis announced Van Dam as the new ECW Champion. The ECW locker room came to the ring to celebrate with Van Dam, but it was unclear at the time whether Van Dam was "officially" WWE Champion.

== Reception ==
The overall reaction to the pay-per-view was very good, with 280,000 people ordering the event, down from the 325,000 orders the previous year.

== Aftermath ==
On Raw the next day, Paul Heyman addressed the controversy of Rob Van Dam's WWE Championship win. He announced that Vince McMahon ruled Van Dam's WWE Championship win as official and that the WWE Championship would be rechristened as the ECW World Heavyweight Championship on the premiere of ECW on Sci Fi. On the debut episode of ECW on June 13, 2006, Heyman presented Van Dam with the ECW World Heavyweight Championship. Van Dam said that he had opted to keep the spinner belt (sarcastically remarking that "this one spins!"), making him both WWE Champion and ECW World Heavyweight Champion. Edge, who was the number one contender for Van Dam's WWE Championship at Vengeance, appeared and speared Van Dam. Soon after, John Cena came through the crowd and attacked Edge, followed by a punch to Heyman, before being chased out by ECW Originals. At Vengeance, Van Dam defeated Edge to retain the WWE Championship while Cena defeated Sabu in an Extreme Rules lumberjack match.

The 2006 One Night Stand would be the last to include the "ECW" initialism in its title, as in 2007, the event was promoted as WWE One Night Stand, and was held as an event for wrestlers from all three of WWE's brands as brand-exclusive PPVs were discontinued after WrestleMania 23 in April 2007.

== Results ==
No.	Results	Stipulations	Times
1	Tazz defeated Jerry Lawler by technical submission	Singles match	0:35
2	Kurt Angle defeated Randy Orton by submission	Singles match	15:07
3	The F.B.I. (Little Guido and Tony Mamaluke) (with Big Guido) defeated Yoshihiro Tajiri and Super Crazy by pinfall	Tag team match	12:24
4	Rey Mysterio (c) vs. Sabu ended in a no contest	Extreme Rules match for the World Championship	9:10
5	Edge, Mick Foley, and Lita defeated Terry Funk, Tommy Dreamer, and Beulah McGillicutty by pinfall	Hardcore match	18:45
6	Balls Mahoney defeated Masato Tanaka by pinfall	Extreme Rules match	5:03
7	Rob Van Dam defeated John Cena (c) by pinfall	Extreme Rules match for the WWE Championship; This was Van Dam's Money in the Bank cash-in match.	20:40
(c) / – the champion(s) heading into the match

== See also ==
- List of ECW supercards and pay-per-view events
