= Jim LaRock =

American professional wrestler (1923–2006)

Personal information
- Born: James C. LaRock; September 3, 1923 Odgensburg, New York, U.S.
- Died: August 3, 2006 (aged 82)

Professional wrestling career
- Ring name: Jim LaRock
- Billed weight: 165 lb (75 kg)
- Debut: 1954
- Retired: 1962

James C. LaRock (September 3, 1923 – August 3, 2006) was an American wrestler who competed in the Greco-Roman and later a professional wrestler.

Served in the U.S. Army. There, he earned a European-African Middle Eastern Campaign medal, an Army Good Conduct medal, and a World War II Victory medal.

LaRock was in second place NCAA wrestling in 1950 with Ithaca College when he lost to Bill Smith. That same year he was named an All-American and finished his collegiate career with 31 wins and 26 pins. He was the central YMCA champion, national YMCA champion, and national AAU champion for two years. His older brother Wilford was equally skilled on the mat, and was also an AAU champion. Also, LaRock was an alternate on the U. S. Olympic team in 1952.

In 1954, he made his professional wrestling debut. He won the TSW United States Junior Heavyweight Champion in Oklahoma in 1958. He retired form wrestling in 1962.

After, LaRock was a teacher at Heuvelton Central School in Heuvelton, New York, where he was a science and physical education teacher, and coach of the football and wrestling teams. He retired in 1989.

LaRock died on August 3, 2006, at 81.

== Championships and accomplishments ==
- NWA Northwest
  - NWA Northwest Tag Team Championship (1) with Jack Kiser
- NWA Tri-State
  - TSW Oklahoma Junior Heavyweight Champion (1)
  - TSW United States Junior Heavyweight Champion (1)
