= No Way Out (2006) =

World Wrestling Entertainment pay-per-view event

- Promotional poster featuring Randy Orton
- Promotion: World Wrestling Entertainment
- Brand: SmackDown!
- Date: February 19, 2006
- City: Baltimore, Maryland
- Venue: 1st Mariner Arena
- Attendance: 11,000
- Buy rate: 218,000

Pay-per-view chronology
← Previous; Royal Rumble	Next → WrestleMania 22

No Way Out chronology
← Previous; 2005	Next → 2007

The 2006 No Way Out was a professional wrestling pay-per-view (PPV) event produced by World Wrestling Entertainment (WWE). It was the eighth No Way Out and took place on February 19, 2006, at the 1st Mariner Arena in Baltimore, Maryland, held exclusively for wrestlers from the promotion's SmackDown! brand division.

The main event saw Kurt Angle defend his World Heavyweight Championship against The Undertaker. Angle won the match after reversing a Triangle Choke into a jackknife cover. One of the predominant matches on the card was Randy Orton versus Rey Mysterio for Mysterio's world championship match at WrestleMania 22. Orton won the match with a roll-up while using the ropes for extra leverage. Another primary match on the undercard was Booker T versus Chris Benoit for the WWE United States Championship, which Benoit won after forcing Booker to submit to the Crippler Crossface.

== Production ==
=== Background ===
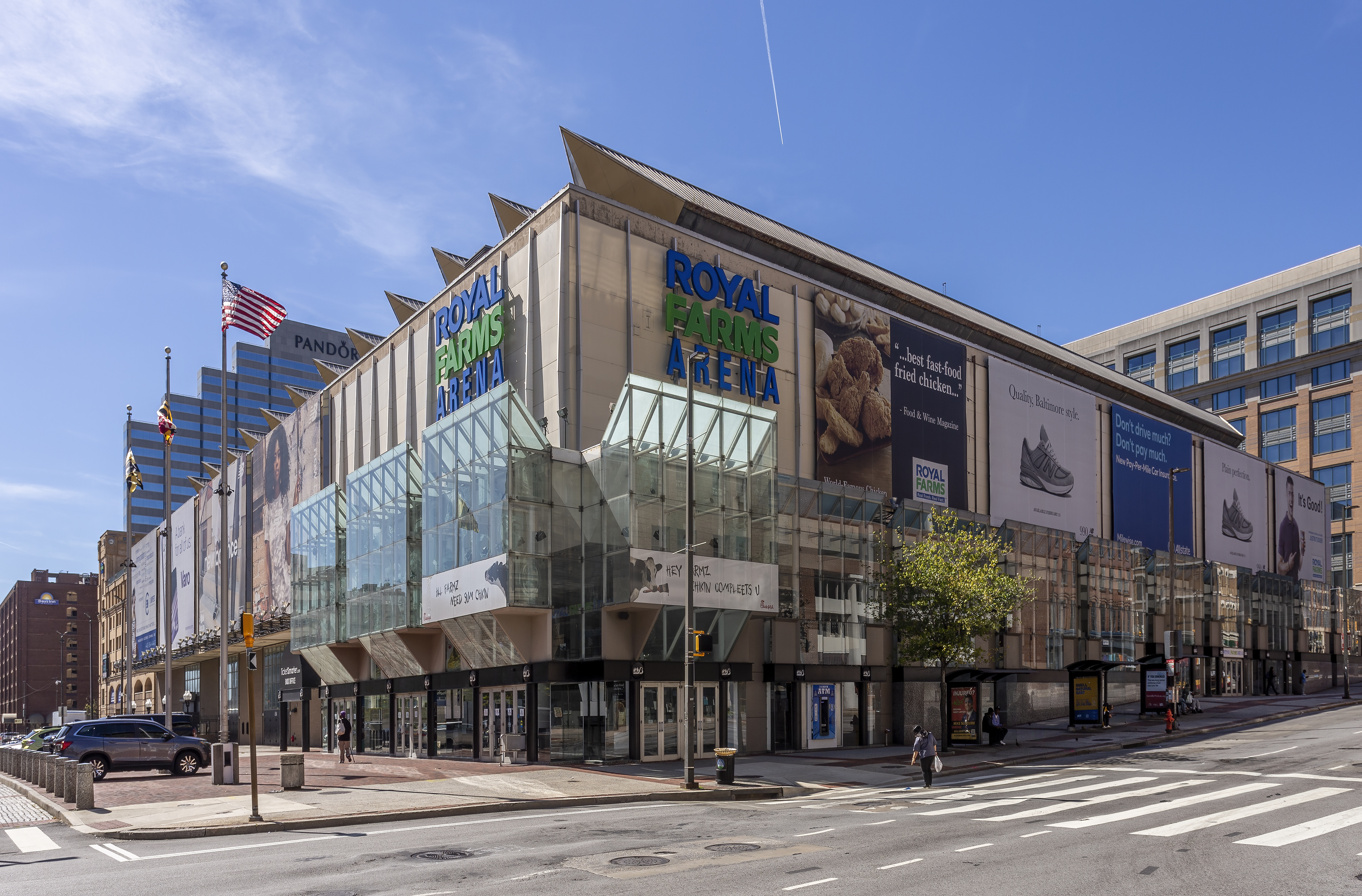
The eighth No Way Out was held at the 1st Mariner Arena in Baltimore, Maryland.

No Way Out was a professional wrestling pay-per-view (PPV) event first held by World Wrestling Entertainment (WWE) as the 20th In Your House PPV event in February 1998. Following the discontinuation of the In Your House series in February 1999, No Way Out was reinstated in February 2000 as its own PPV event, thus establishing it as the annual February PPV for the promotion. The eighth No Way Out was held on February 19, 2006, at the 1st Mariner Arena in Baltimore, Maryland. Like the previous two years's events, the 2006 event featured wrestlers exclusively from the SmackDown! brand. The official theme song was "Deadly Game" by Theory of a Deadman.

=== Storylines ===
The event featured seven professional wrestling matches with outcomes predetermined by WWE script writers. The matches featured wrestlers portraying their characters in planned storylines that took place before, during and after the event.

The main feud heading into No Way Out was between Kurt Angle and The Undertaker, with the two battling over the World Heavyweight Championship. At the previous pay-per-view, Royal Rumble, Angle defeated Mark Henry to retain the World Heavyweight Championship. When the match was over, The Undertaker came out and issued a challenge to Angle for the World Heavyweight Championship. On the February 3 episode of SmackDown!, Angle accepted his offer and the match at No Way Out was made official. The next week on SmackDown!, The Undertaker defeated Henry by disqualification after MNM, along with Daivari, came out and attacked The Undertaker. After the match, MNM, Henry, and Daivari attacked The Undertaker until Angle came out and made the save. SmackDown! General Manager Theodore Long then announced that The Undertaker and Angle would face off against Henry and MNM in a 3-on-2 Handicap match next week. On the February 17 episode of SmackDown!, The Undertaker and Angle defeated MNM and Henry after Angle forced Johnny Nitro to submit to the Ankle lock.

Rey, you're lookin' up towards the heavens like you're lookin' at Eddie. Let me tell you something, bro, Eddie ain't in Heaven, Eddie's down there ... in Hell!

— Randy Orton, SmackDown! – February 3, 2006

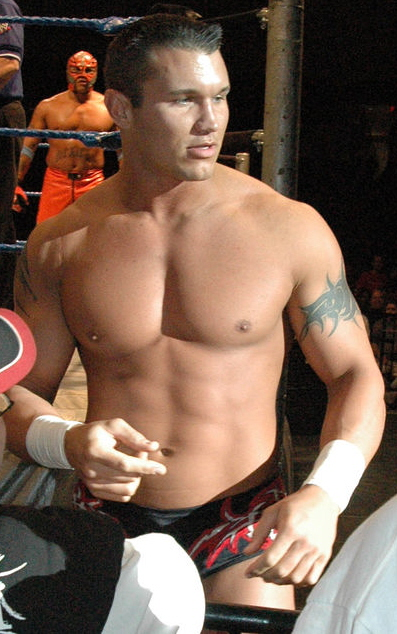
Randy Orton, who challenged Rey Mysterio for his WrestleMania 22 world championship match.

The other main match on the card was Randy Orton versus Rey Mysterio for Mysterio's world championship match at WrestleMania 22. Their match stemmed from the Royal Rumble. At the Royal Rumble, Mysterio won the 2006 Royal Rumble match to earn a world championship match at WrestleMania 22 by last eliminating Orton. On the February 3 episode of SmackDown!, Orton claimed that there was no way Mysterio could beat him in a normal match and that he won the match because of some divine intervention. Orton then challenged Mysterio to a match at No Way Out for his title match at WrestleMania 22, and claimed that Eddie Guerrero (Mysterio's friend who had died months prior) was not in heaven, but in hell. Later that night, Orton along with Mark Henry defeated Mysterio and Kurt Angle. Midway through the match, Davari confronted Angle and was chased outside the ring and into the crowd. Henry followed, leaving Mysterio and Orton on their own. Orton gained the pinfall after sitting on Mysterio. After the match, Orton claimed that Mysterio had as much chance of defeating him as Guerrero did of coming back to life. Mysterio responded by accepting Orton's challenge on behalf of Guerrero. The next week on SmackDown!, Orton set the record straight about the comments he made about Guerrero. Backstage, he said that he only made the comments to get inside Mysterio's head, and that he did not know or care if Guerrero was in Hell. Orton later entered the arena in a lowrider to further explain his actions, and read an excerpt from Guerrero's book, Cheating Death, Stealing Life – The Eddie Guerrero Story, but Mysterio attacked him, dropkicking his head into the steel ringpost. On the February 17 episode of SmackDown!, Mysterio faced off against Sylvan, which Mysterio won after a West Coast Pop. After the match, Orton came out and said that Mysterio would never main event WrestleMania, he would never become World Champion and that he could never beat him.

== Event ==
Other on-screen personnel
Role:	Name:
English commentators	Michael Cole
English commentators	Tazz
Spanish commentators	Carlos Cabrera
Spanish commentators	Hugo Savinovich
Interviewer	Kristal Marshall
Ring announcer	Tony Chimel
Referees	Charles Robinson
Referees	Nick Patrick
Referees	Jim Korderas
Referees	Chris Kay

Before the event aired, The Boogeyman defeated Simon Dean in a match taped for Heat.

The first match that aired was a nine-man match for the WWE Cruiserweight Championship in which Gregory Helms defended the title against Brian Kendrick, Funaki, Kid Kash, Nunzio, Paul London, Psicosis, Scotty 2 Hotty and Super Crazy. In the beginning, Helms hid outside the ring but his opponents brought him into the ring and attacked him. Helms received a Sliced Bread #2 from Kendrick, a senton bomb from London and the Worm from Scotty. Psicosis pinned Helms but Kash broke the pin. Kash performed a Dead Level on Psicosis but Super Crazy broke up the pinfall by performing a moonsault. Helms pinned Psicosis to retain the title.

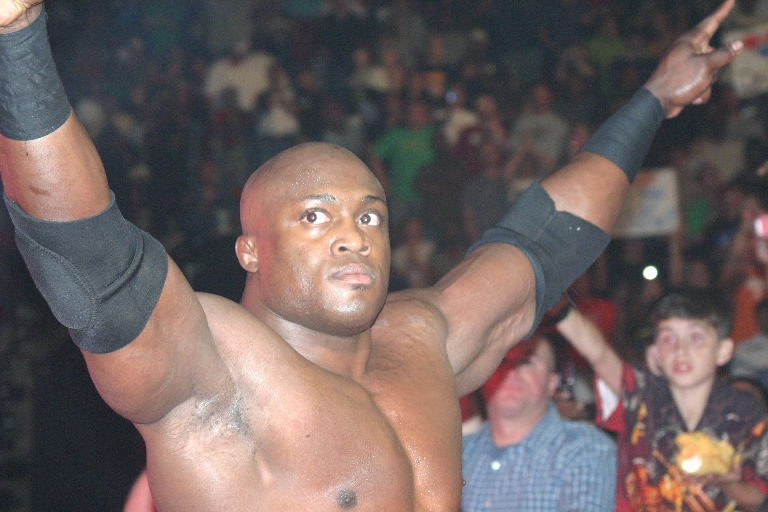
Bobby Lashley, who faced John "Bradshaw" Layfield (JBL).

Next was John "Bradshaw" Layfield (JBL) facing Bobby Lashley. Before the match started, Lashley prevented Finlay from attacking Kristal. While Lashley and Finlay fought, JBL made his entrance and took advantage of the situation. Lashley controlled the match but JBL threw him outside the ring and applied a sleeper hold. JBL leapt off the top rope but Lashley caught him with a powerslam. Lashley performed four belly to belly suplexes until Finlay threw Tony Chimel into the ring, distracting the referee. With the referee distracted, Finlay hit Lashley with a shillelagh. JBL took advantage and executed a Clothesline from Hell to win the match.

WWE Tag Team Champions MNM (Joey Mercury and Johnny Nitro) issued an open challenge for a future WWE Tag Team Championship match, which was accepted by Matt Hardy and Tatanka. Tatanka and Hardy controlled the match in the beginning but MNM isolated Hardy for most of the match. Hardy tagged in Tatanka, who chopped MNM. He sent Mercury outside the ring but Melina interfered, allowing Nitro to perform a dropkick on Tatanka off the apron. MNM isolated Tatanka but Tatanka clotheslined Nitro and tagged in Hardy. Hardy attempted a Twist of Fate but Nitro superkicked Hardy. Hardy tagged in Tatanka, who performed a double tomahawk chop on MNM. Tatanka executed a Trail's End on Mercury while Hardy executed a Twist of Fate on Nitro and Tatanka pinned Mercury to win a match for the WWE Tag Team Championship.

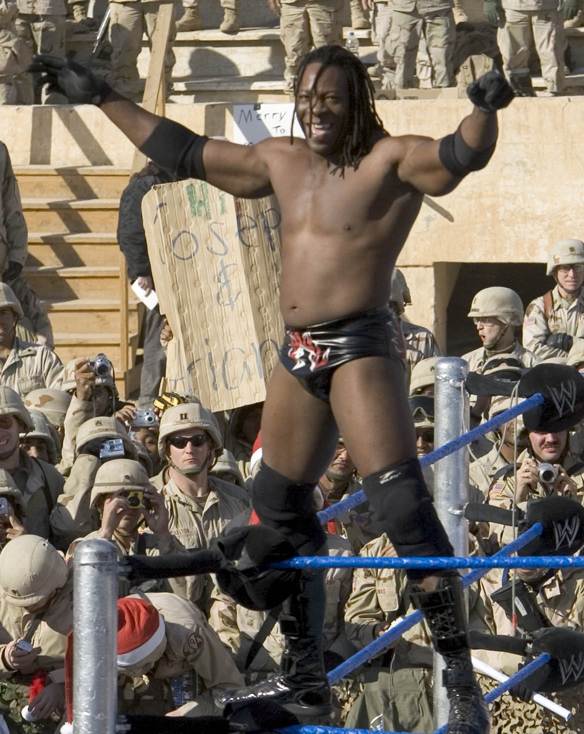
Booker T as United States Champion heading into No Way Out.

The fourth match was for the WWE United States Championship between Booker T and Chris Benoit. Before the match began, Booker T announced that he would forfeit the United States title. As Benoit confronted Sharmell, Booker T attacked Benoit. Benoit controlled the match in the beginning as he performed a series of suplexes. After Booker T told the referee that his groin was re-injured, the referee backed Benoit away but Booker T pushed him into the steel steps. Benoit performed a series of German suplexes and paid tribute to Eddie Guerrero by performing the Three Amigos. Booker T attempted a Houston Hangover but missed. Benoit executed a series of German suplexes until Sharmell jumped on the apron. Benoit attempted a diving headbutt but Sharmell's distraction allowed Booker T to counter. Booker T executed a Scissors Kick for a near-fall. Sharmell distracted Benoit again and Booker T pinned him with a roll up but Benoit countered into a Sharpshooter attempt, which Booker T countered. Benoit avoided a Scissors Kick and applied the Sharpshooter but Booker T fought the move. Benoit forced Booker T to submit to the Crippler Crossface to win the title.

Next was Rey Mysterio facing Randy Orton with Mysterio's WrestleMania 22 world championship match on the line. Orton controlled the match in the beginning. Mysterio attempted a hurricanrana but Orton caught him and tackled him into the ringpost, injuring his hand. Orton targeted Mysterio's arm and hand. Mysterio executed a hurricanrana but landed on the injured hand. Orton continued to target Mysterio's hand. Orton held Rey in the electric chair but Mysterio countered into a Sunset Flip Powerbomb for a near-fall. Mysterio dropkicked Orton and attempted a 619 but Orton avoided the move and pinned Mysterio with a roll-up using the ropes to win Rey's world title match at WrestleMania.

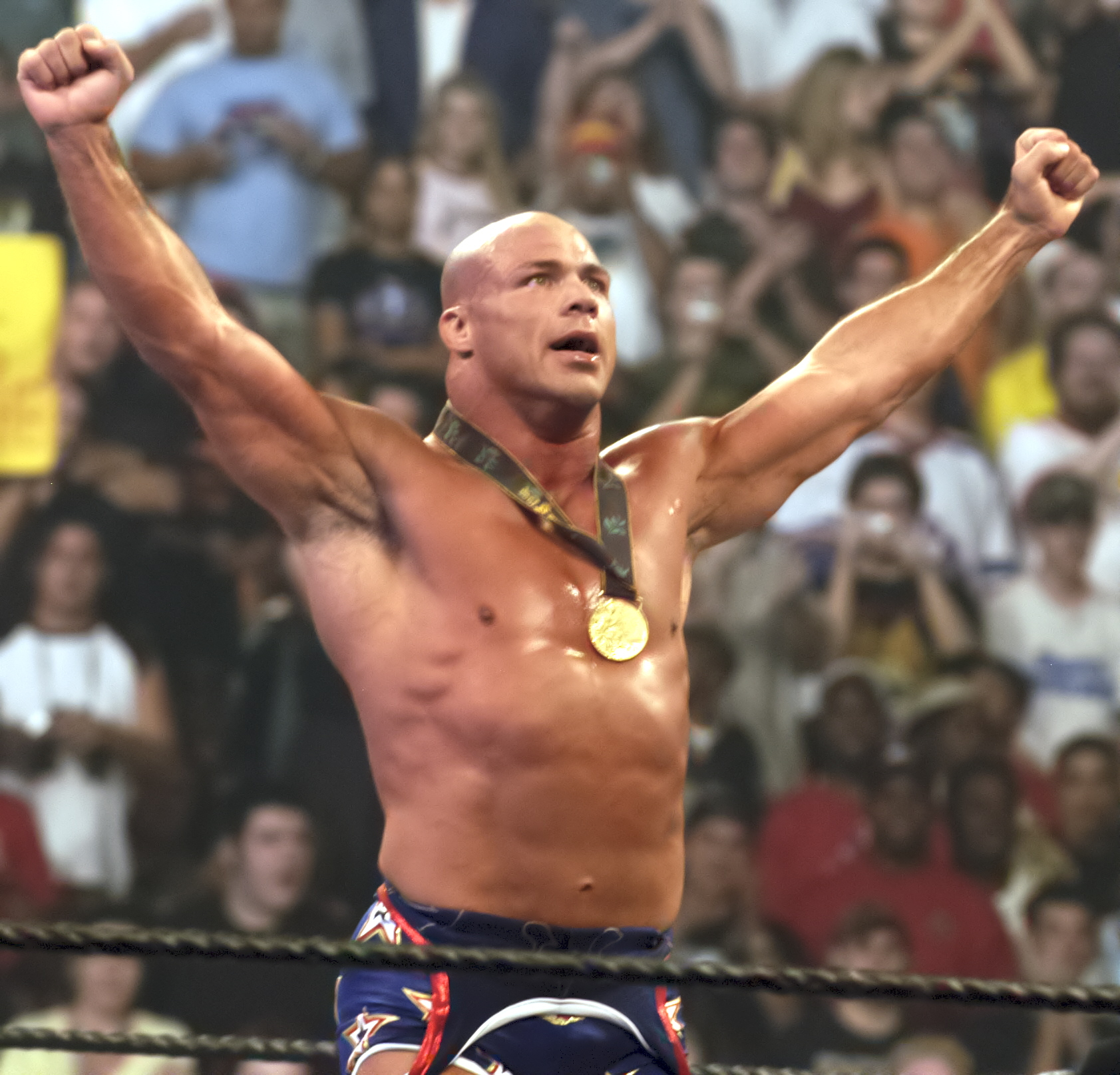
Kurt Angle faced The Undertaker for the World Heavyweight Championship.

In the main event, Kurt Angle faced The Undertaker for the World Heavyweight Championship. The Undertaker controlled the start of the match, performing Old School and Snake Eyes. Angle performed a German suplex on The Undertaker and sent The Undertaker into the barricade. The Undertaker tackled Angle into the ringpost and dropped a leg on him whilst Angle was on the apron. The Undertaker attempted a chokeslam but Angle kicked The Undertaker's leg to counter. Angle applied an ankle lock. The Undertaker sent Angle outside the ring and attempted another leg drop but Angle countered with an ankle lock. Angle released the hold and applied the ankle lock outside the ring, Angle applied the ankle lock in the ring, which The Undertaker countered into a triangle choke. As they fought outside the ring, Angle executed an Angle Slam through a broadcast table. After countering each other's signature moves, Angle executed an Angle Slam for a near-fall. The Undertaker applied a Triangle Choke on Angle but Angle countered, rolling up The Undertaker to retain the title.

== Aftermath ==
On the March 3 episode of SmackDown!, Kurt Angle defended the World Heavyweight Championship against The Undertaker in a rematch. The Undertaker was in control and executed a Tombstone Piledriver on Angle. As The Undertaker made the cover, Mark Henry interfered into the match causing a disqualification. Angle was disqualified thus The Undertaker won the match but not the title because a title cannot change hands via disqualification. Angle retained the title but Henry started attacking The Undertaker. Henry splashed The Undertaker through the announcer's table. This led to a casket match between The Undertaker and Henry at WrestleMania, which The Undertaker won.

Due to Randy Orton defeating Rey Mysterio at No Way Out for Mysterio's world championship title opportunity, SmackDown! General Manager Theodore Long, disgusted by Orton's actions in the match at No Way Out, booked Orton and Mysterio against Kurt Angle in a triple threat match for the World Heavyweight Championship, which took place at WrestleMania. Mysterio went on to win the match and the World Heavyweight Championship from Angle after pinning Orton for the win.

== Results ==
No.	Results	Stipulations	Times
1^{H}	The Boogeyman defeated Simon Dean by pinfall	Singles match	1:55
2	Gregory Helms (c) defeated Brian Kendrick, Funaki, Kid Kash, Nunzio, Paul London, Psicosis, Scotty 2 Hotty, and Super Crazy	Cruiserweight Open for the WWE Cruiserweight Championship	9:42
3	John "Bradshaw" Layfield (with Jillian Hall) defeated Bobby Lashley by pinfall	Singles match	10:58
4	Matt Hardy and Tatanka defeated MNM (Joey Mercury and Johnny Nitro) (with Melina) by pinfall	Tag team match	10:28
5	Chris Benoit defeated Booker T (c) (with Sharmell) by submission	Singles match for the WWE United States Championship	18:11
6	Randy Orton defeated Rey Mysterio by pinfall	Singles match to determine the #1 contender for the World Heavyweight Championship at WrestleMania 22	17:28
7	Kurt Angle (c) defeated The Undertaker by pinfall	Singles match for the World Heavyweight Championship	29:38
(c) / – the champion(s) heading into the match; H / – the match was broadcast prior to the pay-per-view on Sunday Night Heat
