= WWE vs. ECW Head-to-Head =

Event produced by World Wrestling Entertainment

- Promotional poster featuring various WWE and ECW wrestlers
- Promotion: World Wrestling Entertainment
- Brand(s): Raw; SmackDown! Extreme Championship Wrestling
- Date: June 7, 2006
- City: Dayton, Ohio
- Venue: Nutter Center
- Attendance: 4,700

Event chronology
← Previous; Judgment Day (2006)	Next → ECW One Night Stand (2006)

WWE vs ECW Head-to-Head was a professional wrestling television special event produced by World Wrestling Entertainment (WWE). It was held on June 7, 2006 at the Nutter Center in Dayton, Ohio. The event, which aired on the USA Network, served as a preview show for the ECW One Night Stand pay-per-view, airing only four days before that event.

The event was themed around matches between wrestlers from WWE's Raw and SmackDown! brands and their newly established ECW brand.

== Storylines ==
WWE vs. ECW Head-to-Head featured professional wrestling matches that involved wrestlers from pre-existing scripted feuds, plots, and storylines that played out on WWE's weekly television programs, Raw and SmackDown!. Wrestlers portrayed heroes or villains as they followed a series of events that built tension and culminated in a wrestling match or series of matches.

== Results ==
No.	Results	Stipulations	Times
1	Rob Van Dam (ECW) defeated Rey Mysterio (WWE)	Singles match	10:43
2	Mickie James (WWE) defeated Jazz (ECW)	Singles match	2:01
3	Big Show (ECW) won by last eliminating Randy Orton (WWE)	WWE vs. ECW Battle Royal	14:20
4	Edge (WWE) (with Lita and Mick Foley) defeated Tommy Dreamer (ECW) (with Terry Funk)	Extreme Rules match	6:45
5	John Cena (WWE) defeated Sabu (ECW) by disqualification	Extreme Rules match	8:04

=== Eliminations in the WWE vs. ECW Battle Royal ===
– WWE
– ECW
– Winner

No. of elimination	Wrestler	Brand	Eliminated by
1	Mark Henry	WWE	Kurt Angle and Nunzio
2	Matt Hardy	WWE	Justin Credible and Terry Funk
3	Nunzio	ECW	Big Show
4	Tatanka	WWE	Tommy Dreamer
5	Carlito	WWE	The Sandman
6	Tony Mamaluke	ECW	Edge
7	Tommy Dreamer	ECW	Edge and Randy Orton
8	Terry Funk	ECW	Edge and Finlay
9	Justin Credible	ECW	Finlay
10	Al Snow	ECW	Shelton Benjamin
11	Steven Richards	ECW	Bobby Lashley
12	Balls Mahoney	ECW	Bobby Lashley
13	Bobby Lashley	WWE	Kurt Angle
14	The Sandman	ECW	Randy Orton
15	Shelton Benjamin	WWE	Kurt Angle
16	Finlay	WWE	Kurt Angle
17	Edge	WWE	Kurt Angle
18	Kurt Angle	ECW	Randy Orton
19	Randy Orton	WWE	Big Show
Winner	Big Show^{1}	ECW	N/A

^{1}Raw (with its wrestlers Big Show and Randy Orton) had at first won the Battle Royal, but Big Show would take off his Raw Shirt, revealing that he had sided with ECW, and then proceeded to eliminate Randy Orton to win the match for the ECW team.

== See also ==
- 2006 in professional wrestling
