= WrestleMania 22 =

2006 World Wrestling Entertainment pay-per-view event

- Promotional poster featuring John Cena performing a "Bulldog" on Booker T at No Mercy in 2004
- Promotion: World Wrestling Entertainment
- Brand(s): Raw; SmackDown!
- Date: April 2, 2006
- City: Rosemont, Illinois
- Venue: Allstate Arena
- Attendance: 17,155
- Buy rate: 975,000
- Tagline: Big Time!

Pay-per-view chronology
← Previous; No Way Out	Next → Backlash

WrestleMania chronology
← Previous; 21	Next → 23

WrestleMania 22 was a 2006 professional wrestling pay-per-view (PPV) event produced by World Wrestling Entertainment (WWE). It was the 22nd annual WrestleMania and took place on April 2, 2006, at the Allstate Arena in the Chicago suburb of Rosemont, Illinois, held for wrestlers from the promotion's Raw and SmackDown! brand divisions.

There were two main events, which were the main matches for each brand. The final match, which was the main match from the Raw brand, was John Cena versus Triple H for the WWE Championship, which Cena won after forcing Triple H to submit to the STFU. The predominant match on the SmackDown! brand was a triple threat match for the World Heavyweight Championship between champion Kurt Angle, Rey Mysterio, and Randy Orton. Mysterio won the match and the World Heavyweight Championship after pinning Orton following a 619 and a West Coast Pop—during Mysterio's reign, the championship was simply called the World Championship due to Mysterio not being a heavyweight wrestler.

Featured matches on the undercard included a No Holds Barred match where Shawn Michaels defeated Vince McMahon, a Casket match where The Undertaker defeated Mark Henry, a WWE Women's Championship match from Raw where Mickie James defeated Trish Stratus to win the championship, a Hardcore Match where Edge defeated Mick Foley, and an interpromotional Money in the Bank ladder match where Rob Van Dam defeated Bobby Lashley, Finlay, Matt Hardy, Ric Flair, and Shelton Benjamin.

WrestleMania 22 was the third WrestleMania to take place at the Allstate Arena, after the middle portion of WrestleMania 2 in 1986 and WrestleMania 13 in 1997; both were held at the venue when it was still known as the Rosemont Horizon (renamed in 1999). Tickets sold out in under two minutes, grossing US$2.5 million for the event, making it the highest grossing one-day event at the Allstate Arena. More than 17,155 people from 16 countries and 43 U.S. states attended, with millions more watching in more than 90 countries. WrestleMania 22 also marked the last WrestleMania to be held in a traditional arena, as every subsequent edition has been held in a stadium, excluding WrestleMania 36 in 2020, which was held at the WWE Performance Center behind closed doors due to the COVID-19 pandemic.

== Production ==
=== Background ===
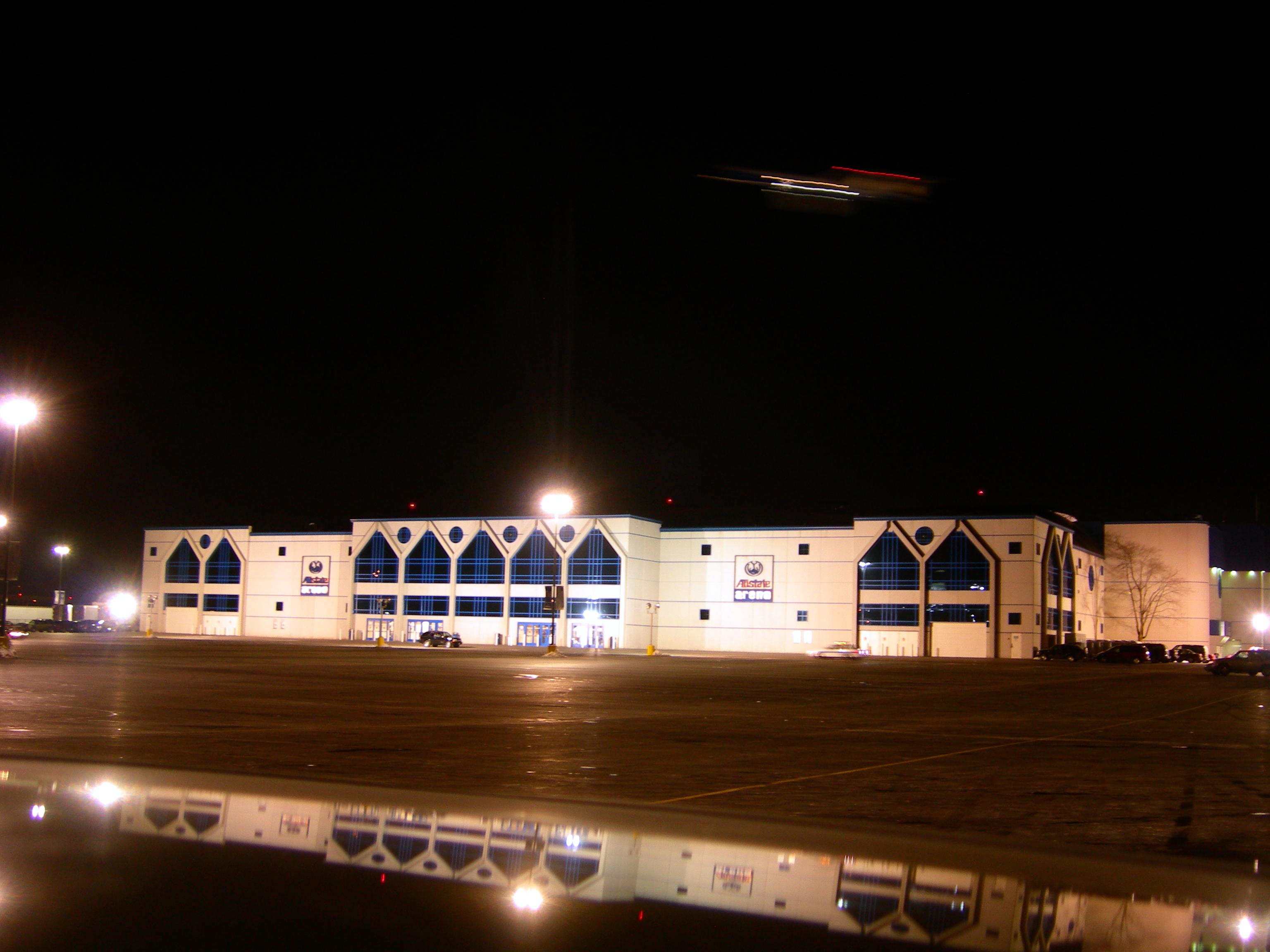
This was the third WrestleMania held at the Allstate Arena in the Chicago suburb of Rosemont, Illinois, after the middle portion of WrestleMania 2 in 1986 and WrestleMania 13 in 1997; both were held at the venue when it was still known as the Rosemont Horizon (renamed in 1999).

WrestleMania is considered World Wrestling Entertainment's (WWE) flagship professional wrestling pay-per-view (PPV) event, having first been held in 1985. It has become the longest-running professional wrestling event in history and is held annually between mid-March to mid-April. It was the first of WWE's original four pay-per-views, which includes Royal Rumble, SummerSlam, and Survivor Series, referred to as the "Big Four". WrestleMania 22 was scheduled to be held on April 2, 2006, at the Allstate Arena in the Chicago suburb of Rosemont, Illinois and featured wrestlers from the Raw and SmackDown! brand divisions. It was the third WrestleMania to take place at the Allstate Arena, after the middle portion of WrestleMania 2 in 1986 and WrestleMania 13 in 1997; both were held at the venue when it was still known as the Rosemont Horizon (renamed in 1999).

=== Storylines ===
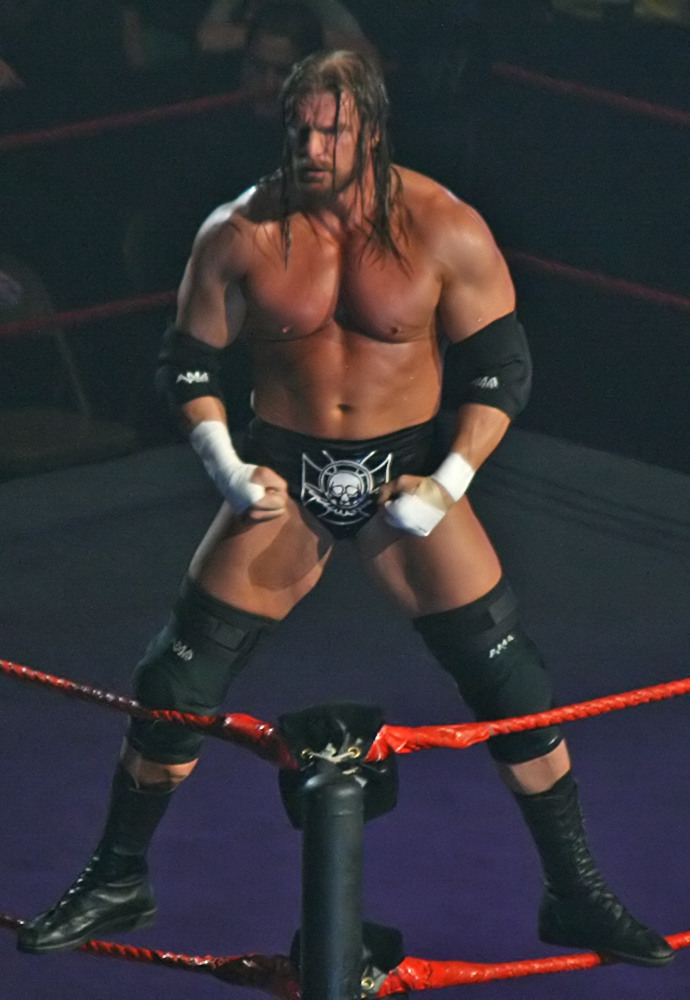
Triple H, who challenged John Cena for Raw's WWE Championship

The main feud heading into WrestleMania on the Raw brand was between John Cena and Triple H over the WWE Championship. After failing to win the Royal Rumble match, Triple H participated in the 2006 Road to WrestleMania Tournament, where the winner would become the number-one contender to the WWE Championship at WrestleMania. In the final match of the tournament, held on the February 20 episode of Raw, Triple H faced Rob Van Dam and Big Show in a triple threat match. Triple H won the match after pinning Van Dam following a Pedigree.

The predominant feud on the SmackDown! brand was between Kurt Angle, Rey Mysterio, and Randy Orton over the World Heavyweight Championship. Mysterio won the 2006 Royal Rumble match, last eliminating Orton, to earn a world championship match at WrestleMania. At No Way Out, Orton cheated to defeat Mysterio and win his WrestleMania 22 world championship match. Five days later, on the February 24 edition of SmackDown!, SmackDown! General Manager Theodore Long announced that the World Heavyweight Championship match at WrestleMania 22 would be a Triple Threat match involving Mysterio, Orton, and champion Angle.

Another primary feud from Raw was between Shawn Michaels and Vince McMahon. On the December 26, 2005, episode of Raw, McMahon and Michaels had words ending with McMahon threatening that he could screw Michaels just like he did Bret Hart anytime he wanted. During the following couple of weeks on Raw, McMahon had inflicted some humiliation on Michaels. On the January 23 edition of Raw when it was between Michaels and Shelton Benjamin with McMahon declaring that if Michaels were to lose, he would also lose his spot in the Royal Rumble match. Michaels won the match and kept his spot in the Royal Rumble match but a few moments later, McMahon met Michaels backstage then stated that lady luck was on his side. He also said that he wanted to turn back the clock to the days of sex, drugs, and rock n' roll then he asked Michaels to join him but got turned down, however, and McMahon last stated that Michaels' luck would run out at the Royal Rumble. At the Royal Rumble, during the Royal Rumble match, McMahon distracted Michaels as his music started to play. During that time, Shane McMahon, who was not an official entrant in the match, eliminated Michaels after attacking him from behind. One month later, on the February 27 edition of Raw, Shane hit Michaels with a steel chair and forced him to "kiss" Vince's ass, thus joining Vince's "Kiss My Ass Club". Vince then announced that he and Michaels would face off against each other at WrestleMania. On Raw two weeks later, Vince forced Michaels to take a public drug test all due to Michaels being deceived and drugged by Vince's daughter, Stephanie McMahon on the March 6 episode of Raw. During the test, however, Michaels threw his urine on both Vince and Shane. Later that night, Michaels faced off against the Spirit Squad in a Steel Cage match. The Spirit Squad won the match by pinning Michaels after Shane interfered and slammed the cage door on Michaels. After the match, Shane continued attacking Michaels, causing him to bleed in the process, and executed a Coast 2 Coast. At Saturday Night's Main Event XXXII, Michaels faced off against Shane in a Street Fight. Near the end of the match, Shane locked Michaels in the sharpshooter, and Vince ordered the match to end. Vince screwed Michaels, claiming he submitted to the move, and declared Shane the winner via submission. On the March 20 episode of Raw, Vince announced that his match against Michaels at WrestleMania would now be a No Holds Barred match.

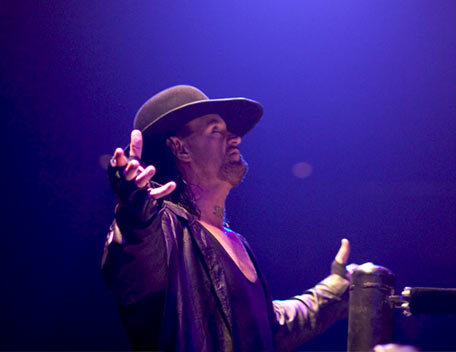
The Undertaker, who faced Mark Henry in a casket match at the event

One of the featured matches on the undercard was a Casket match between The Undertaker and Mark Henry. On the March 3 episode of SmackDown!, The Undertaker challenged Kurt Angle for the World Heavyweight Championship. During the match, after The Undertaker executed a Tombstone piledriver, Henry came out and attacked The Undertaker, causing the match to end via disqualification. The Undertaker won the match, but since a championship cannot change hands via countout or disqualification, he did not win the title. The following week on SmackDown!, The Undertaker challenged Henry to a casket match at WrestleMania. On the March 18 episode of Saturday Night's Main Event XXXII, Henry, along with his manager Daivari, called out The Undertaker. The Undertaker came out, accompanied by Druids carrying a casket, and the two started attacking each other. Shortly after, The Undertaker performed a chokeslam, followed by a Tombstone piledriver, on Daivari on the casket.

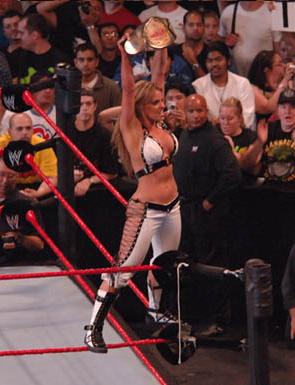
Trish Stratus as Raw's WWE Women's Champion

One of the main matches on the undercard was a singles match between Mickie James and Trish Stratus for the WWE Women's Championship. James debuted in WWE on the October 10, 2005, episode of Raw coming to the aid of then Women's Champion Stratus from an attack from Victoria. She wrestled under the gimmick of Stratus' biggest fan. The two competed in tag team action together frequently where James was becoming extremely obsessed with Stratus. James became the number one contender for the Women's Championship on the December 12 episode of Raw by defeating Victoria in a match to determine who would face Stratus at New Year's Revolution. She was unable to win the title at New Year's Revolution. The storyline between James and Stratus developed into a lesbian angle after James initiated an intimate kiss with Stratus under the mistletoe and complimented on the size of her breasts. At the Royal Rumble James confessed to Stratus that she loved her. It finally became too much for Stratus as she then told James that they needed time apart. The two teamed together at Saturday Night's Main Event XXXII to defeat the team of Victoria and Candice Michelle. After the match, James honored Stratus' wish to have time apart, but later attempted to kiss her, and attacked Stratus after she refused.

The secondary Divas feud entering the event was between Torrie Wilson and Candice Michelle. Torrie and Candice became villains when they were traded to the Raw roster on August 22, 2005, and later aligned with Victoria to form the stable known as Vince's Devils. On the February 27, 2006, edition of Raw, Candice failed to defeat Trish Stratus in a match for Stratus' WWE Women's Championship, and slapped Torrie in a backstage segment after the match; showing signs of tension between the two. On the following week's edition of Raw, the evil Candice unveiled her Playboy cover and then attempted to force Torrie to admit that her cover was hotter than both of Torrie's Playboy covers. When Torrie refused, Candice and Victoria both attacked her in the ring, resulting in a face turn from Torrie. It was later announced that Torrie and Candice would face each other in a Playboy Pillow Fight at WrestleMania 22.

== Event ==
Other on-screen personnel
Role:	Name:
English commentators	Jim Ross (Raw)
English commentators	Jerry Lawler (Raw)
English commentators	Michael Cole (SmackDown!)
English commentators	Tazz (SmackDown!)
English commentators	Joey Styles (Foley/Edge match)
Spanish commentators	Carlos Cabrera
Spanish commentators	Hugo Savinovich
Interviewers	Jonathan Coachman
Interviewers	Todd Grisham
Interviewers	Josh Mathews
Ring announcer	Tony Chimel (SmackDown!)
Ring announcer	Lilian Garcia (Raw)
Ring announcer	Howard Finkel (WWE Hall of Fame)
Referees	Chris Kay (SmackDown!)
Referees	Jim Korderas (SmackDown!)
Referees	Nick Patrick (SmackDown!)
Referees	Charles Robinson (SmackDown!)
Referees	Mike Chioda (Raw)
Referees	Jack Doan (Raw)
Referees	Mickie Henson (Raw)
Referees	Chad Patton (Raw)

Before the event went live on pay-per-view, an 18-man interpromotional battle royal was held. Viscera won by last eliminating Snitsky. Destiny's Child member Michelle Williams sang "America the Beautiful" before the show.

The opening match was for the World Tag Team Championship between champions Big Show and Kane and Carlito and Chris Masters. Kane executed a big boot on Masters that started with Masters trying to interrupt a choke slam, then chokeslammed Carlito to get the victory and retain the titles.

The second match was the Money in the Bank ladder match between Rob Van Dam, Shelton Benjamin, Ric Flair, Finlay, Bobby Lashley, and Matt Hardy. In the end, Van Dam climbed the ladder but was stopped when Benjamin springboarded onto the ladder and the two fought. Hardy came out with a second ladder and joined the two. Van Dam pushed Hardy and Benjamin's ladder, sending them both smashing on the floor. Van Dam grabbed the briefcase and won the match.

Howard Finkel introduced the WWE Hall of Fame class of 2006: "Mean" Gene Okerlund, "Sensational" Sherri Martel, Tony Atlas, Verne Gagne, William "The Refrigerator" Perry, and The Blackjacks (Blackjack Mulligan and Blackjack Lanza) attended the event while Eddie Guerrero was represented by his wife Vickie Guerrero and Eddie's nephew Chavo Guerrero. Bret Hart did not attend the event as he was not comfortable.

The third match was between John "Bradshaw" Layfield (JBL) and Chris Benoit for the WWE United States Championship. During JBL's entrance, the entrance ramp was raised and JBL's limousine drove out from underneath. JBL attempted a Clothesline From Hell on Benoit, who avoided the move and applied in the Crippler Crossface. JBL countered and used the ropes for leverage to win the match.

The fourth match was a hardcore match between Edge and Mick Foley. In the end, Foley pulled out a table but Lita hit Foley in between the legs with a barbed wire bat and lit the table, allowing Edge to perform a Spear on Foley through the flaming table on the outside for the victory. Both wrestlers had abrasions and were covered in blood from the barbed wire bat and Foley's barbed wire sock; Edge went into shock after the match.

Next, Booker T and Sharmell faced The Boogeyman in a handicap match. During the match, Boogeyman kissed Sharmell with a mouth full of worms, causing her to flee to the back. Boogeyman executed a Falling Chokebomb on Booker T for the victory.

The sixth match was a Divas match between Trish Stratus and Mickie James for the WWE Women's Championship. Mickie executed a Mick Kick on Trish to win the match and the WWE Women's Championship. Despite portraying a psychotic heel, Mickie James was audibly cheered by the crowd during the match.

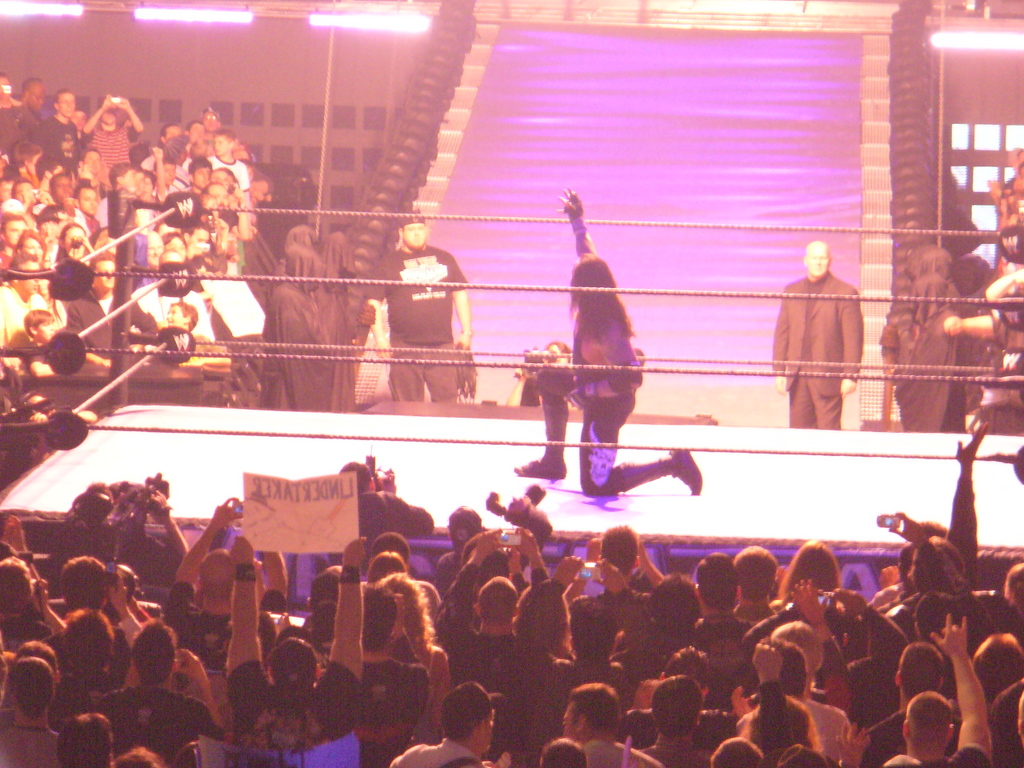
The Undertaker after his win over Mark Henry

Next, The Undertaker faced Mark Henry in a casket match. The Undertaker took the advantage and executed a Last Ride on Henry. While Henry was out of the ring, The Undertaker executed a suicide dive over the top rope. The Undertaker then performed a Tombstone Piledriver on Henry and pushed him into the casket to win the match and improve his WrestleMania record to 14–0.

The eighth match was a No Holds Barred match between Shawn Michaels and Vince McMahon. Michaels put McMahon on a table and put a trashcan over McMahon's head. Michaels then climbed on the top of a ladder and executed a diving elbow drop on McMahon through the table. Michaels then executed Sweet Chin Music on McMahon to win the match.

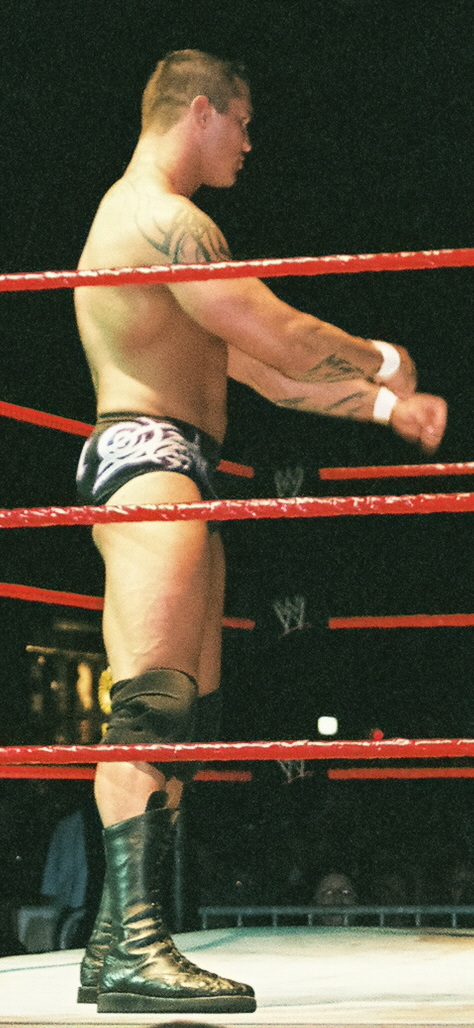
Randy Orton faced Rey Mysterio and defending champion Kurt Angle in a triple threat match for SmackDown!'s World Heavyweight Championship.

Next, Kurt Angle defended his World Heavyweight Championship against Rey Mysterio and Randy Orton in a triple threat match. During Mysterio's entrance, P.O.D. performed Mysterio's music entrance live. In the end, Mysterio performed a 619 on Orton followed by a West Coast Pop to win the title. After the match, Mysterio celebrated with Chavo and Vickie Guerrero.

The tenth match was a Playboy pillow fight between Torrie Wilson and Candice Michelle. Wilson pulled Candice's dress and Candice later pulled Wilson's dress. The match ended with Wilson pinning Candice with a roll-up for the win.

In the main event, John Cena defended his WWE Championship against Triple H. Triple H came out to the ring on a throne dressed as a Conan-type king, while Cena came out with a tommy gun and was accompanied by a group of "gangsters" (one of which was future WWE Champion and Chicago native CM Punk, who had recently signed with WWE and, at the time, was performing with Ohio Valley Wrestling (OVW),) in a 1940s Chicago-era vehicle. The match was evenly matched with both men getting the advantage over each other. Triple H tried a Pedigree, but Cena countered with an FU for a near-fall. Cena applied the STFU but Triple H reached the ropes. Triple H tried another Pedigree, but was countered into the STF again by Cena, to which Triple H submitted, meaning Cena retained the WWE Championship.

== Reception ==
WrestleMania 22 was largely praised by various wrestling publications and websites. Writing for Canadian Online Explorer's Slam! Sports vertical, Dale Plummer and Nick Tylwalk stated that "With more wrestling, fewer interviews, and more pageantry than the last several editions, this year's 'Mania had a "Big Time" feel to it". He rated the overall event 8 out of 10 stars, which was a higher rating than the previous year's event. The main event between Triple H and John Cena for the WWE Championship was rated 8.5 out of 10 stars, the Triple Threat Match for the World Heavyweight Championship between Kurt Angle, Rey Mysterio and Randy Orton was rated 8.5 out of 10 stars, the No Holds Barred match between Shawn Michaels and Vince McMahon received a perfect 10 out of 10 stars, the Casket match between Mark Henry and The Undertaker was rated 7 out of 10 stars, the Hardcore match between Edge and Mick Foley was rated 8.5 out of 10 stars and the Money in the Bank ladder match was rated 7 out of 10 stars. Robert Leighty Jr of 411mania gave the event an overall score of 8.0 out of 10.0 commented on how "This is a pretty solid show as both title matches deliver in one aspect or another. Shawn tries to steal the show again, but Edge and Foley take that honor in a crazy-ass brawl. This was the last Mania held in an arena and it's a fun atmosphere because of the jacked-up crowd. Throw in another solid Money in the Bank Match, and a memorable Women's Title match, and you have a fun show all around!"

Over the years, WrestleMania 22 became regarded as one of the better WrestleManias in its history. In their 2018 ranking of every WrestleMania from worst to best, Cultaholic placed WrestleMania 22 as the fifth best of all time. In their YouTube video explaining their rankings, presenter Adam Pacitti stated that "fans who attended to this 'Mania were treated to a quadruple-header of wonderful matches," praising the main event between Triple H and Cena as well as the hardcore match between Edge and Foley, the Michaels beatdown of McMahon, and the WWE Women's Championship match between Mickie James and Trish Stratus ("the first good women's match in 'Mania history...intense, controversial, and, most importantly, entertaining"). John Canton of TJR Wrestling Reviews praised the entire event, and called Edge vs. Mick Foley the best match of the show. To date Edge spearing Mick Foley into a flaming table remains one of the most iconic and memorable moments in pro wrestling history. The match itself has been highly regarded in recent years and was a subject of WWE's Untold Series on the WWE Network and NBC's Peacock.

== Aftermath ==
=== Raw ===
The next night on Raw, Triple H said to John Cena that he lost at WrestleMania 22 because he underestimated the champ. Edge then came out and said to Triple H that he deserved another WWE Championship match because he defeated Mick Foley in a Hardcore match. Over the next few weeks, all three men faced each other in Handicap matches, which all three men won over the three-week period by pinning and making each other submit, respectively. It was then announced that the main event at Backlash would be a Triple Threat Match for the WWE Championship between Cena, Edge and Triple H. At Backlash, Cena won the match and retained the WWE Championship via pinfall on Triple H with a jackknife roll-up, but after the match, Triple H attacked Cena, Edge and the referee with a sledgehammer.

After WrestleMania, Shawn Michaels continued to feud with Vince McMahon. At Backlash, Michaels teamed up with "God" to face Vince and Shane McMahon. At Backlash, Michaels suffered a loss when the Spirit Squad interfered on behalf of The McMahons. Triple H became involved in the feud as well, initially on Vince and Shane's side, but on May 22, 2006, he attacked the Spirit Squad after being ordered to the ring by McMahon to "finish off" Michaels. On the June 12, 2006, edition of Raw, Vince announced that Triple H would face the Spirit Squad in a 5 on 1 Handicap Gauntlet match. Vince called Mitch out last, as throughout the match he had called out the other four members one-by-one, instead Mitch was thrown out from the curtain by Michaels. Michaels ran down the ramp and started attacking the Spirit Squad with Triple H, marking the return of D-Generation X (D-X). At Vengeance, D-X faced the Spirit Squad in a 5 on 2 Handicap match, which D-X won after both Michaels and Triple H pinned Kenny and Mikey, respectively.

Mickie James continued to feud with Trish Stratus. At Backlash, Stratus won the match by disqualification, legitimately dislocating her shoulder in the process. Due to regulations by WWE, a title cannot change hands via disqualification. As a result, James was still champion. Whilst injured, Stratus still appeared on-screen and during the storyline, Beth Phoenix made her debut as Stratus' ally, claiming that James had wronged Phoenix in the past. She returned to the ring on the June 26 episode of Raw, where she cleanly lost a Women's Championship match against James, thus ending the feud.

The next night on Raw, saw the return of Jamal, who last appeared on WWE programming in 2003 and going by the name of Umaga, as he attacked Ric Flair. The two would go on to wrestle at Backlash. Umaga's run would saw him winning the Intercontinental Championship and lasted until June 2009; he would later pass away in December at the age of 36 after a heart attack.

Rob Van Dam would announce that he would cash in his Money in the Bank against John Cena at ECW One Night Stand. Van Dam would go on to win the match capturing his first WWE Championship.

=== SmackDown! ===
Rey Mysterio went on to feud with John "Bradshaw" Layfield (JBL) over the World Heavyweight Championship. On the May 5 edition of SmackDown!, after Mysterio expressed his feelings about being World Heavyweight Champion, JBL came out and declared himself the number one contender. Mysterio reacted by saying that he would fight anyone at any time. In turn, JBL announced that Mysterio would face off against Mark Henry later that night. Henry won the match via pinfall. The next week on SmackDown!, JBL announced that Mysterio would take on The Great Khali. Khali won the match via pinfall. At Judgment Day, Mysterio defeated JBL by pinfall after performing a Frog Splash. After the pay-per view, the feud ended between the two when JBL's rematch against Mysterio turned into his last match if he failed to win the World Championship.

The Undertaker's feud with Mark Henry would come to an end after the two-faced off on SmackDown!, only to be interrupted by the debuting The Great Khali who attacked The Undertaker.

== Results ==
No.	Results	Stipulations	Times
1^{P}	Viscera won by last eliminating Snitsky (Note: The other participants were (in order of elimination): Simon Dean, Rob Conway, Funaki, Lance Cade, Steven Richards, Matt Striker, Super Crazy, Goldust, William Regal, Eugene, Trevor Murdoch, Psicosis, Johnny Nitro, Joey Mercury, Tyson Tomko and The Road Warrior.)	18 Man Interpromotional Battle Royal	9:03
2	Big Show and Kane (c) defeated Carlito and Chris Masters by pinfall	Tag team match for the World Tag Team Championship	6:42
3	Rob Van Dam defeated Bobby Lashley, Finlay, Matt Hardy, Ric Flair, and Shelton Benjamin	Money in the Bank ladder match	12:14
4	John "Bradshaw" Layfield (with Jillian Hall) defeated Chris Benoit (c) by pinfall	Singles match for the WWE United States Championship	9:45
5	Edge (with Lita) defeated Mick Foley by pinfall	Hardcore match	14:36
6	The Boogeyman defeated Booker T and Queen Sharmell by pinfall	Intergender Handicap match	3:43
7	Mickie James defeated Trish Stratus (c) by pinfall	Singles match for the WWE Women's Championship	8:31
8	The Undertaker defeated Mark Henry	Casket match	9:26
9	Shawn Michaels defeated Mr. McMahon (with Shane McMahon) by pinfall	No Holds Barred match	18:24
10	Rey Mysterio defeated Kurt Angle (c) and Randy Orton by pinfall	Triple threat match for the World Heavyweight Championship	9:19
11	Torrie Wilson defeated Candice Michelle	Playboy pillow fight match	3:57
12	John Cena (c) defeated Triple H by submission	Singles match for the WWE Championship	22:02
(c) / – the champion(s) heading into the match; P / – the match was broadcast on the pre-show

=== Road To WrestleMania Tournament ===
This was a tournament held to determine John Cena's challenger for the WWE Championship at WrestleMania 22.

1st Round; Raw; February 6, 2006
Big Show	Pinfall
Shelton Benjamin	3:45
Ric Flair	11:35
Triple H	Pinfall
Chris Masters	Pinfall
Kane	3:06
Carlito	8:55
Rob Van Dam	Pinfall

Semifinals; Raw; February 13, 2006 (Aired: February 16)
Big Show	Countout (13:33) (Note: Due to their match ending in double countout in the semifinals, a triple threat match with Big Show, Rob Van Dam, and Triple H was booked for the final.)
Triple H	Countout (13:33)
Chris Masters	5:04
Rob Van Dam	Pinfall

Final; Raw; February 20, 2006
Triple H	Pinfall
Big Show Rob Van Dam	— 12:44
