= ECW World Heavyweight Championship =

Former men's professional wrestling championship

- The ECW World Heavyweight Championship belt used in WWE from June 2006 to July 2008 was based on the design used in ECW from May 1998 to April 2001.

Details
- Promotion: Extreme Championship Wrestling (1992–2001); World Wrestling Entertainment (2006–2010)
- Date established: April 25, 1992
- Date retired: February 16, 2010

Other names
- ECW Heavyweight Championship (1992–1993); NWA-ECW Heavyweight Championship (1993–1994); ECW World Heavyweight Championship (1994–2001, 2006); ECW World Championship (2006–2007); ECW Championship (2007–2010)
Statistics
- First champion: Jimmy Snuka
- Final champion: Ezekiel Jackson
- Most reigns: The Sandman (5 reigns)
- Longest reign: Shane Douglas (4th reign, 406 days)
- Shortest reign: Ezekiel Jackson (2 minutes, 25 seconds)
- Oldest champion: Mr. McMahon (61 years, 248 days)
- Youngest champion: Mikey Whipwreck (22 years, 146 days)
- Heaviest champion: Big Show (567 lb (257 kg))
- Lightest champion: Jerry Lynn (185 lb (84 kg))

The ECW World Heavyweight Championship was a men's professional wrestling world heavyweight championship originally used in Extreme Championship Wrestling (ECW) and later, World Wrestling Entertainment (WWE). It was the original world title of the ECW promotion, spun off from the NWA World Heavyweight Championship. It was established under ECW in 1994 but was originally introduced in 1992 by the promotion's precursor, Eastern Championship Wrestling, a territory of the National Wrestling Alliance (NWA). The inaugural champion was Jimmy Snuka in 1992; however, WWE considers the inaugural world heavyweight champion to be Shane Douglas, with his reign beginning on August 27, 1994, when Eastern Championship Wrestling split from the NWA to become Extreme Championship Wrestling.

The title was deactivated in 2001 when ECW ceased all of its operations. The assets of ECW were then purchased by WWE in 2003. In 2006, WWE reactivated the championship as the world title of their newly established ECW brand. It was the third concurrently active world championship in the promotion, complementing the WWE Championship and World Heavyweight Championship (2002–2013 version) of the other two brands, Raw and SmackDown. The ECW Championship then briefly appeared as the sole world title of the Raw brand in 2008 as a result of that year's draft. When WWE disbanded the ECW brand in 2010, the championship was subsequently retired following the final episode of ECW with Ezekiel Jackson as the final titleholder, who consequently had the shortest reign at 2 minutes, 25 seconds as he won it during the episode. The ECW Championship was the fourth overall world title to be utilized by WWE, after the WWE Championship (1963–present), the WCW Championship (2001), and the World Heavyweight Championship (2002–2013).

== History ==
=== Origin ===
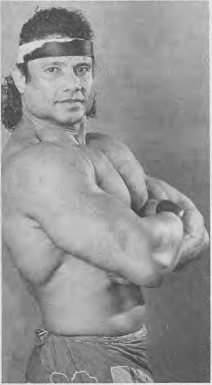
Jimmy Snuka was the inaugural ECW Heavyweight Champion

The ECW World Heavyweight Championship was introduced originally in 1992 as the NWA-ECW Heavyweight Championship with Jimmy Snuka becoming the inaugural champion on April 25. However, its origin is attributed to events that began in the National Wrestling Alliance (NWA), an organization with many member promotions. In the early 1990s, Eastern Championship Wrestling (ECW) was a member of the NWA and by 1994, the NWA World Heavyweight Championship, the world title of the NWA, was vacant. Consequently, a tournament was organized to crown a new NWA World Heavyweight Champion and on August 27, NWA-ECW Heavyweight Champion Shane Douglas defeated 2 Cold Scorpio in the finals to win the title. However, Douglas immediately relinquished the NWA World Heavyweight Championship and instead proclaimed himself the new ECW World Heavyweight Champion. ECW subsequently seceded from the NWA and became Extreme Championship Wrestling (ECW). The ECW World Heavyweight Championship was thus established, spun off from the NWA title.

=== Injury dispute and unification with the FTW Heavyweight Championship ===
In 1998, during a time when ECW World Heavyweight Champion Shane Douglas was sidelined with a legitimate elbow injury but refused to vacate the title, Taz introduced an unsanctioned championship known as the FTW (Fuck the World) Heavyweight Championship. Frustrated by the lack of opportunity to compete for the ECW World Heavyweight Championship, Taz unveiled the FTW Heavyweight Championship to assert himself as the "real world champion" on May 14, 1998.

Although never officially sanctioned by ECW, Taz defended the FTW Heavyweight Championship until losing to Sabu on December 19, 1998. Upon finally defeating Shane Douglas for the ECW World Heavyweight Championship on January 10, 1999 at ECW Guilty as Charged, Taz went on to defeat Sabu on March 21 at ECW Living Dangerously to effectively unify the two titles.

=== Interpromotional title change ===
In April 2000, the ECW World Heavyweight Championship became the focus of a highly unusual inter-promotional conflict involving ECW, World Championship Wrestling (WCW), and the World Wrestling Federation (WWF). At the time, Mike Awesome was the reigning ECW World Heavyweight Champion and without prior notice to ECW, Awesome made a surprise appearance on the April 10 episode of WCW Monday Nitro after signing a contract with WCW. ECW owner Paul Heyman responded by filing a legal injunction to prevent Awesome from appearing on WCW programming with the ECW World Heavyweight Championship belt.

To resolve the situation and ensure the title was returned to ECW, an agreement was brokered between WCW, ECW, and the WWF, with the latter agreeing to loan former ECW wrestler Taz for a one-night appearance to reclaim the ECW World Heavyweight Championship from Awesome. On April 13, 2000, at an ECW event in Indianapolis, Indiana, Taz defeated Awesome to win the ECW World Heavyweight Championship, marking a rare instance in professional wrestling where two wrestlers signed to separate promotions faced each other for a third promotion’s world championship.

On April 22, 2000 at ECW CyberSlam, Tommy Dreamer defeated Taz to become the new ECW World Heavyweight Champion, thereby returning the title fully to ECW. The title remained active until April 11, 2001, when ECW ceased operations. In May 2002, WWF renamed to World Wrestling Entertainment (WWE) and subsequently purchased ECW's assets on January 28, 2003.

=== Revival ===
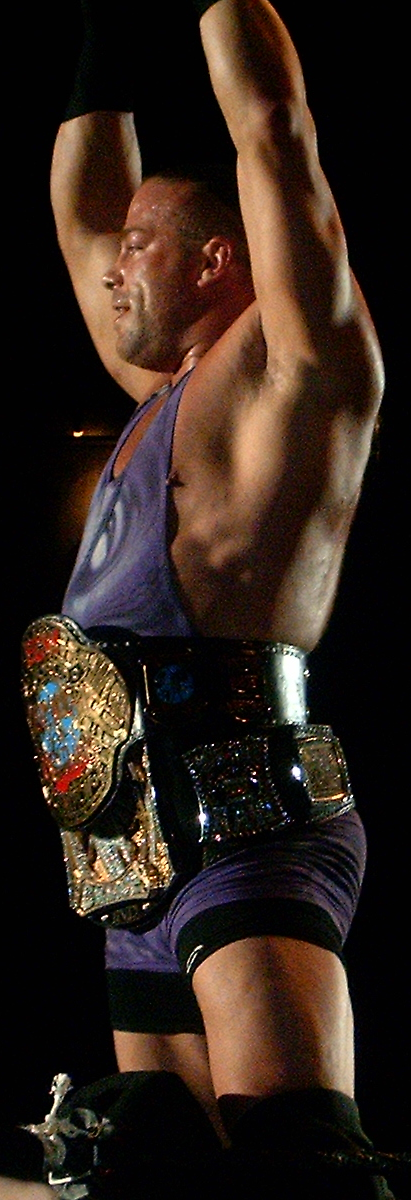
Rob Van Dam with both the ECW World Heavyweight Championship and WWE Championship around his waist

In July 2001, ECW was incorporated into WWF programming as part of "The Invasion," which briefly featured an alliance of WCW and ECW wrestlers following the WWF's purchase of WCW's assets in March of that year. By 2005, WWE reintroduced ECW through content from the ECW video library and a series of books, which included the release of The Rise and Fall of ECW documentary. With heightened and rejuvenated interest in the ECW franchise, WWE organized ECW One Night Stand on June 12, a reunion event that featured ECW alumni. Due to the financial and critical success of the production, WWE produced the second ECW One Night Stand on June 11, 2006, which served as the premiere event in the relaunch of the ECW franchise as a third WWE brand, complementary to Raw and SmackDown.

On June 13, Paul Heyman, former ECW owner and newly appointed figurehead for the ECW brand, recommissioned the ECW World Heavyweight Championship to be the brand's world title and awarded it to Rob Van Dam as a result of winning the WWE Championship at One Night Stand 2006. Heyman had originally stated that either the WWE Championship or the World Heavyweight Championship would "become" the ECW World Heavyweight Championship if a competitor designated to the ECW brand became WWE Champion or World Heavyweight Champion at the event. However, Rob Van Dam later declared that he would hold both titles simultaneously instead. The title became known as the ECW World Championship in July 2006, and later simply as the ECW Championship in July 2007.

=== ECW World Championship tournament (2007) ===
The ECW World Championship Tournament was a tournament created to determine a new ECW World Champion after Bobby Lashley vacated his championship due to being drafted to Raw on June 11, 2007. The finals took place at Vengeance: Night of Champions. This tournament is notable because one of the semi-final rounds was Chris Benoit's final match. The tournament final was supposed to be Benoit vs CM Punk but Benoit no-showed the event and was replaced by Johnny Nitro, who would go on to win the title. It was reported the day after the event that Benoit, his wife Nancy, and their son Daniel were found dead in their home in suburban Atlanta. The day after police ruled that Benoit himself had killed his wife and son before committing suicide. This event has gone on to be known as the Chris Benoit double murder and suicide.

Semifinals
CM Punk	Pin
Marcus Cor Von	06:45
Chris Benoit	Sub
Elijah Burke	06:38

Finals
CM Punk	Pin
Johnny Nitro(*)	08:15

(*) – Johnny Nitro was an event-day replacement added by WWE after Chris Benoit was a no-show, with the official statement a "family emergency". It was later discovered Benoit's double murder/suicide had taken place that weekend.

=== Retirement and legacy ===
The ECW Championship was officially retired on February 16, 2010, following the final episode of ECW, where Ezekiel Jackson defeated Christian to become the final champion. Through its relaunch, the ECW brand shifted focus from original ECW alumni toward experimenting with new talent. This laid the groundwork for NXT, which would evolve into WWE’s primary developmental brand and gain critical acclaim for its experimental nature and emphasis on emerging talent. Though the ECW Championship was retired, its legacy remains through NXT’s focus on new talent and its appeal to a dedicated fanbase reminiscent of ECW’s innovative and rebellious spirit.

=== Brand designation ===
Following the events of the WWE brand extension, an annual WWE draft was established, in which select members of the WWE roster are reassigned to a different brand. ECW was revived as a third brand in 2006 to rival Raw and SmackDown and continued to operate until February 16, 2010, rendering the title inactive once again.

Date of transition	Brand	Notes
June 13, 2006	ECW	After Rob Van Dam defeated John Cena to win the WWE Championship at ECW One Night Stand, the ECW Championship was reactivated and awarded to Van Dam, who held both titles. The ECW Championship subsequently became the top championship of WWE's ECW brand.
January 22, 2008	SmackDown	The ECW Championship moved to SmackDown after Chavo Guerrero, a member of the SmackDown brand, defeated CM Punk to win the ECW Championship.
March 30, 2008	ECW	ECW Champion Kane was transferred to ECW.
June 23, 2008	Raw	ECW Champion Kane was drafted to Raw during the 2008 WWE Draft.
June 29, 2008	ECW	The ECW Championship was returned to ECW after Mark Henry, a member of the ECW brand, defeated Kane and Big Show in a triple threat match at Night of Champions to win the ECW Championship.
February 16, 2010	N/A	The ECW brand was discontinued, subsequently also retiring the ECW Championship.

== Championship belt designs ==
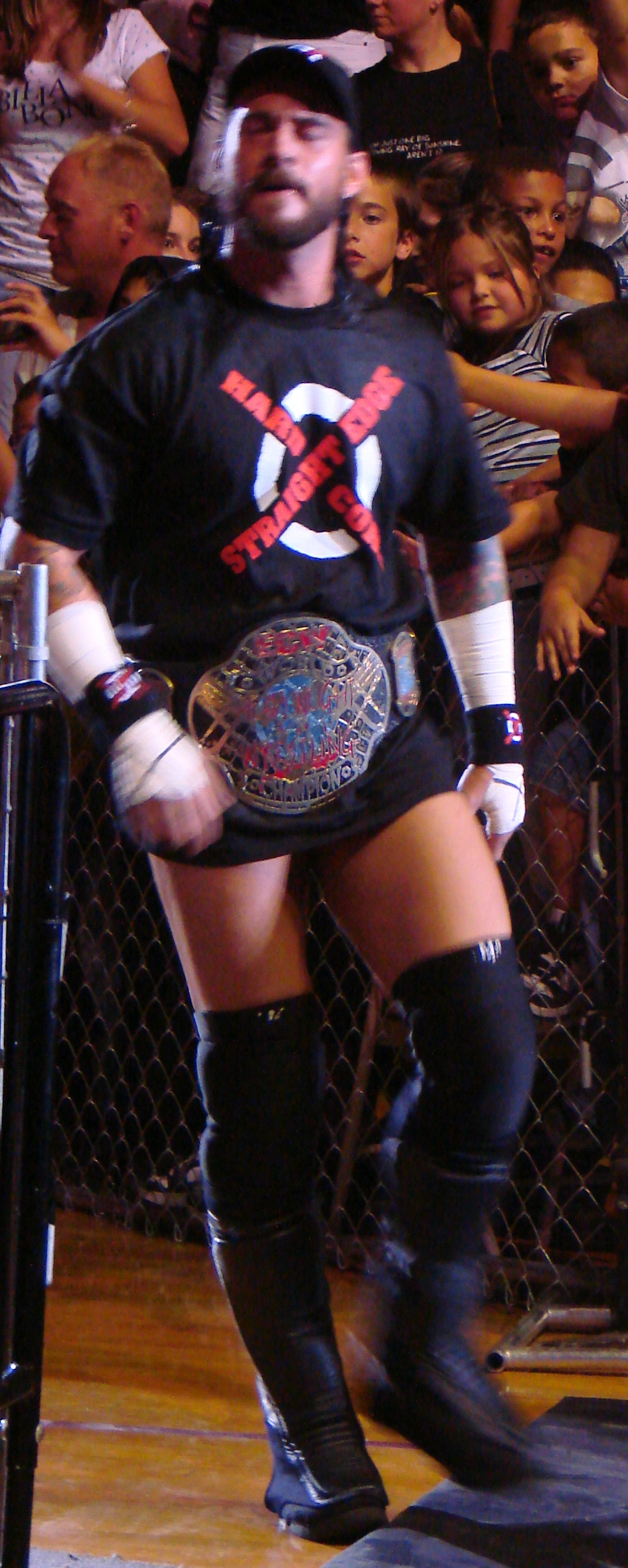
CM Punk as ECW Champion in 2007

The original Eastern Championship Wrestling Heavyweight Championship belt was a five-plate belt made by Mike Vartanian. It was an exact copy of the heavyweight title for NWA-ECW's forerunner, Tri-State Wrestling Alliance, with subtle differences such as its centerpiece featuring the words "Eastern Championship Wrestling" over geographic outlines of Pennsylvania, New Jersey and Delaware in blue. Additionally, the words "Heavy" and "Weight" were separated by a depiction of an eagle centered at the top of the piece, while the words "Wrestling Champion" were displayed at the bottom of the piece just below a small geographic outline of the continental United States. When Eastern Championship Wrestling withdrew from the NWA to become Extreme Championship Wrestling in 1994, it continued using this design until December 1996 when a new belt was created.

The new belt featured a black leather strap, snaps to fasten the belt around the waist of the wrestler who wore it, and five gold-plated metal pieces. The centerpiece design was similar to that of the Big Gold Belt with a crown at the top the piece, a large globe at the center and the words "World Heavyweight Wrestling Champion" displayed prominently. It also included the barbed wire-enlaced ECW logo in red above the globe. The other four pieces along the strap depicted the flags of Mexico, Japan, the United States, United Kingdom, Canada and France.

In May 1998, ECW debuted a new belt designed by Joe Marshall that would be used until the promotion ceased operations in 2001. Like the previous belts, it featured five gold-plated metal pieces along a black leather strap, although this design featured a crocodile skin pattern on the inward-facing side of the strap. Its centerpiece featured a chain-link fencing pattern throughout the body of the plate, a blue globe in the center and depictions of baseball bats wrapped in barbed wire on the sides. At the top of the piece, a violet ECW logo and the words "World Heavyweight Wrestling Champion" were displayed with the words "Heavyweight Wrestling" designed to depict the text as bleeding. The four smaller pieces along the strap featured a design aesthetic similar to that of the centerpiece.

Soon after its reactivation by WWE due to the launch of the ECW brand in June 2006, the ECW World Heavyweight Championship belt design was notably updated from the previous version. These updates included a full black leather strap with a barbed wire design tooled along its edges, red ECW logos replacing the violet ones on the gold-plated pieces, and the innards between the chain-link fencing patterns painted in black. Over time this black paint detailing flaked away due to continued use, resulting in only some of the black paint remaining as an apparent outline of some of the inner chain-link fencing design.

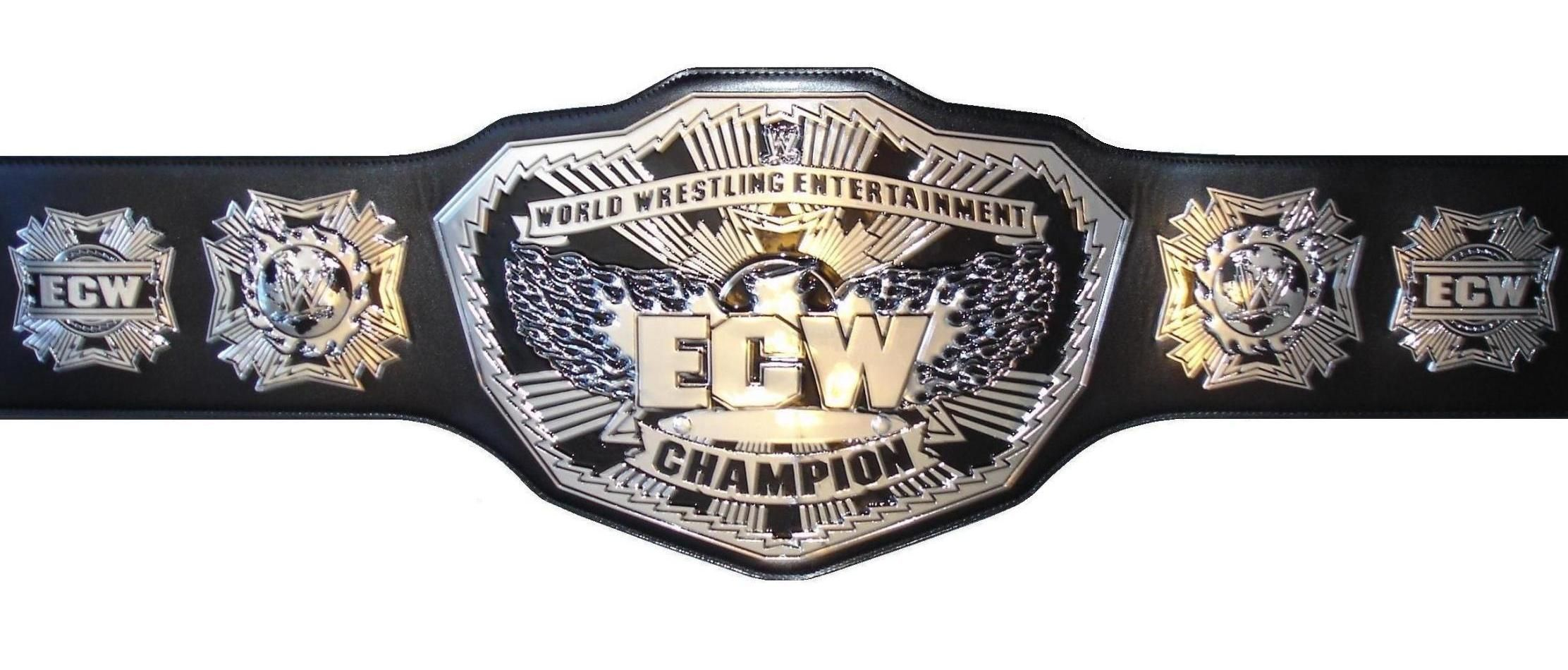
The 2008–2010 ECW Championship belt.

When Mark Henry won the title in 2008, WWE created a new belt since they felt the belt was old-school and too small for Henry. The new belt was revealed on July 22, 2008 by ECW General Manager Theodore Long. This design featured a larger black leather strap with five platinum-plated pieces, which were machined and assembled by André Freitas' AFX Studios Inc, and would be used until the championship was retired in 2010. The large centerpiece featured a design depicting a phoenix over a globe in the center with its wings expanded and rays of light emitting from it. At the top of the piece, the WWE logo and the words "World Wrestling Entertainment" were displayed with "ECW" in large letters projected prominently over the phoenix. A removable nameplate, which had the name of the reigning champion engraved, was located below it and at the bottom of the piece, the word "Champion" was displayed. Additionally, the entire piece was bordered by a jagged saw-like pattern. Along the strap, on each side of the centerpiece, were two similarly designed smaller pieces that were also bordered by a jagged pattern and featured the ECW and WWE logos respectively over a globe on each piece.

== Reigns ==
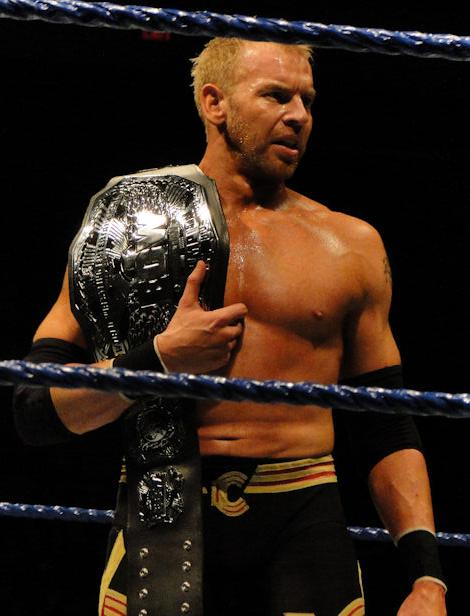
Christian with the last version of the ECW Championship belt in 2009

Overall, there have been 49 ECW World Heavyweight Championship reigns shared among 32 individuals. The inaugural champion was Jimmy Snuka, who won the title by defeating Salvatore Bellomo in April 1992. The Sandman holds the most reigns as champion, with five. Shane Douglas, in his fourth reign, had the longest reign in the title's history which lasted 406 days. Ezekiel Jackson's 3-minute reign following his defeat of Christian on the television finale of ECW is the shortest, as the title was retired with the cancellation of the ECW brand. Christian's second reign was the longest under WWE at 205 days.

== See also ==
- World championships in WWE

Sporting positions
Preceded by NWA World Heavyweight Championship	ECW's top heavyweight championship 1994–2001	Succeeded by Final
