= Mass transit incident =

Mass transit incident may refer to

- Mass Transit incident (professional wrestling), a professional wrestling public relations scandal
- Aviation accidents and incidents
- Train wreck
- List of road accidents
- Shipwrecks

== See also ==
- Lists of disasters
