= Blading (disambiguation) =

Blading may refer to:

- Blading (professional wrestling), the practice of cutting oneself to provoke bleeding
- Aggressive inline skating, a sport using wheeled boots
