= List of former Extreme Championship Wrestling personnel =

Listing of all personnel who appeared in Extreme Championship Wrestling

This is a list of professional wrestlers and other people who appeared in the original incarnation of Extreme Championship Wrestling

Wrestlers who used more than one ringname while in ECW will be listed under the ring name for which they used the most or were best known in order to clean up the list, since any performer who used multiple ring names most likely has them listed on their personal article page with their current or most used ring name in bold on said page. Their other ring names will be listed after their name next to their years worked.

Stables and tag teams will be listed alphabetically in their own separate section at the bottom of the list.

== Alumni ==
=== Male wrestlers ===
| Birth name: | Ring name(s): | Tenure: | Notes |
|---|---|---|---|
| Unknown | A. J. Powers | 1994 | |
| Unknown | Akuma | 2000 | |
| Unknown | The Anchor | 1992 | |
| Unknown | Antifaz del Norte | 1995–2001 | |
| Unknown | Billy Buster | 1994 | |
| Unknown | Bud Liscious | 1997–1998 | |
| Dudley Baker | The Canadian Wolfman | 1992–1993 | |
| Unknown | Chaos | 1994 | |
| Unknown | Chris Krueger | 2000 | |
| Unknown | Damien Knight | 1992 | |
| Unknown | Dan Evans | 1994–1995 | |
| Unknown | The Dark Patriot II | 1993 | |
| Unknown | D-Day | 1995 | |
| Unknown | The Death Rider | 1992–1993 | |
| Unknown | Derek Domino | 1992 | |
| Unknown | Dino Sendoff / Rolling Thunder | 1994–1996 | |
| Unknown | Dr. Disaster | 1994 | |
| Unknown | El Cholo #1 | 1997 | |
| Unknown | El Cholo #2 | 1997 | |
| Unknown | The Equalizer | 1998 | |
| Unknown | The Evil Snake | 1995 | |
| Unknown | The Flamingo Kid | 1995 | |
| Frank Naimoli | Frank Cody | 1992 | |
| Unknown | George Love | 1995 | |
| Justin Bruce Rocheleau | Hellfire / Justin Hellfire | 2000 | |
| Unknown | Hiroyoshi Iekuda | 1995 | |
| Unknown | Hollywood | 1996 | |
| Unknown | Jack Hammer | 1992 | |
| Unknown | Jake Lawless | 1997 | |
| Unknown | Jeff Royal | 1992 | |
| Unknown | Jim Curry | 1992 | |
| Unknown | Jim Lano | 1994 | |
| Unknown | Joe DiFuria / Mr. President / Purple Haze | 1995 | |
| Unknown | Joe Power | 1994 | |
| Unknown | Joel Hartgood | 1994–1996 | |
| Unknown | Joey / Ray Saunders | 2000 | |
| Unknown | John Rock | 1992 | |
| Unknown | Johnny Blaze | 1994 | |
| Unknown | Judge Dread | 1994; 1996 | |
| Unknown | Kevin Quinn | 1997 | |
| Raymond Gajtkowski^{†} | Lost Boy Yar | 1997 | |
| Unknown | The Lumberjack | 1993 | |
| Unknown | Mad Dog Kimble | 1999 | |
| Unknown | Mark Steamboat | 1993-2000 | |
| Unknown | Marty Barnett | 1997 | |
| Unknown | Masato Yakushiji | 1997 | |
| Unknown | Miguel San Juan | 1995 | |
| Unknown | Mike Vee | 1993 | |
| Unknown | Mr. Perez / Rick Perez | 1992 | |
| Unknown | The Musketeer | 2000 | |
| Unknown | O-Dogg | 1996 | |
| Oswald Diggs | Oz | 2000–2001 | |
| Unknown | Pat Day | 1996 | |
| Ruben Cruz | Phoenix / Ruben Cruz | 2000–2001 | |
| Unknown | The Psycho Maker | 1994 | |
| Unknown | Randy Starr | 1993 | |
| Unknown | Ranger Seven | 1995 | |
| Unknown | Rodney Allen | 1996 | |
| Unknown | Sammy Solo | 1998 | |
| Unknown | Scott Summers | 1992 | |
| Unknown | Shawn Evans | 2000 | |
| Unknown | The Silver Jet | 1993 | |
| Unknown | Soul Train Phillips | 1992 | |
| Unknown | Stan Lee | 2001 | |
| Unknown | Stan Parsons | 1994 | |
| Unknown | Steve Nixon | 1999 | |
| Unknown | Todd Shaw | 1993 | |
| Unknown | Todd Wimbleton | 2000 | |
| Unknown | Tom Evans | 2000 | |
| Unknown | The Wolfman | 1993 | |
| Don Adelberg | Don E. Allen | 1992–2000 | |
| Kerry Adkisson ^{†} | Kerry Von Erich | 1993 | |
| Shoji Akiyoshi | Jado | 2000 (Note: Part of FMW talent exchange.) | |
| Achim Albrecht | Brakus | 1997–1998 | |
| Gary Albright ^{†} | Gary Albright | 1996 | |
| Mike Alfonso ^{†} | Mike Awesome | 1993–1994; 1997-2000 | |
| Eric Anderson | Erik Anderson | 1994 | |
| Steven Anderson | Steve Austin | 1995-1997 | |
| Lloyd Anoa'i | L.A. Smooth / The Samoan Warrior | 1992, 1996-1999 | |
| Matt Anoa'i ^{†} | Big Matty Smalls / Mack Daddy Kane | 1996 | |
| Samula Anoa'i | Sammy The Silk | 1996 | |
| Scott Antol | Scotty Anton | 2000 | |
| Edward Bazzaza | Damien Kane | 1996 | |
| Douglas Becker | Adam Flash | 1997–1998 | |
| Rodney Begnaud | Redd Dogg | 2000 | |
| Mike Bell ^{†} | Mike Bell / Mike Brown | 2000–2001 | |
| Christopher Benoit ^{†} | Chris Benoit | 1994–1995 | |
| Matt Bentley | Michael Shane | 2000–2001 | |
| Adolfo Bermudez | D.W. Dudley / Dances With Dudley | 1995–1996 | |
| Scott Bigelow ^{†} | Bam Bam Bigelow | 1994–1998 | |
| Adam Birch | Joey Matthews | 2000–2001 | |
| Rick Bognar ^{†} | Big Titan | 1996 | |
| Michael Bollea | Prey Of The Dead | 1995 | |
| Tom Boric | Paul Diamond | 1993–1994; 1997–1998 | |
| Shayne Bower ^{†} | Biff Wellington | 1996; 1997 | |
| Matt Bowman | Jimmy Cicero | 1996–1997 | |
| Jeff Bradley | Dudley Dudley | 1995–1996 | |
| Tom Brandi | Johnny Gunn | 1993, 1995 | |
| Carl Brantley | Vladimir Koloff | 1993 | |
| Jason Broyles | E.Z. Money / Steve Skyfire | 2000–2001 | |
| Terry Brunk ^{†} | Sabu | 1993–1995; 1995–2000 | |
| Mike Bucci | Nova / Hollywood Nova / Super Nova | 1996–2001 | |
| Barry Buchanan | The Punisher / Studd | 1996 | |
| George Caiazzo ^{†} | John Kronus / Kronus | 1995–1999 | |
| Ruben Cain | Robert Gibson | 1998 | |
| Tommy Cairo | Tommy Cairo | 1992–1994 1998 | |
| David Canal | The Cuban Assassin / David Sierra / Fidel Sierra / Mr. Puerto Rico / The Terrorist | 1998–1999 | |
| Chris Candido ^{†} | Chris Candido / Sir Christopher Candido | 1993; 1996–1999 | |
| Lenny Carlson | Lenny Lane | 1997 | |
| Tom Carter | Reckless Youth | 1998 | |
| James Carullo | Gino Caruso | 1992–1993 | |
| David Cash | Kid Kash / David Cash / Davey Paisano / David Tyler Morton Jericho | 1996–2001 | |
| Tom Casola | The Kodiak Bear | 1992–1993; 1998 | |
| Chris Chetti | Chris Chetti / Chris Van de Lay / Gorgeous Quartermaine | 1996–2000 | |
| Steve Collins | Steve Collins | 1994 | |
| Chad Collyer | Chad Collyer | 1999 | |
| Steve Corino | Steve Corino | 1998–2001 | |
| Gilbert Cosme | Ricky Banderas | 2000 | |
| Thomas Couch ^{†} | Tommy Rogers | 1997–1999 | |
| James Cruickshanks | Jamie Dundee / J. C. Ice | 1998 | |
| Chet Czescik | C.N. Redd | 1992 | |
| Scott D'Amore | Scott Hunter / Scott Warton | 1999 | |
| Christopher Daniels | Christopher Daniels | 1999 | |
| Bill DeMott | Crash / Crash The Terminator | 1993 | |
| Michael Depoli | Roadkill | 1996–2001 | |
| John Devine | Horace The Psychopath | 1999 | |
| Tony DeVito | DeVito / Tony DeVito | 1999–2001 | |
| David DiMeglio ^{†} | Dave Casanova / Dino Casanova | 1992 | |
| Juan Domínguez | El Mosco | 1999 | |
| Joe Dorgan | Swinger / Johnny Swinger | 2000–2001 | |
| D. C. Drake | Don Drake | 1992; 1995-1999 | |
| Darren Drosdov ^{†} | Darren Drozdov | 1997–1998 | |
| Chris Duffy ^{†} | The Bouncer | 1992 | |
| Bobby Duncum Jr. ^{†} | Bobby Duncum, Jr. | 1997–1998 | |
| Anthony Durante ^{†} | Pit Bull #2 / Pit Bull Rex | 1992–2000 | |
| Michael Durham ^{†} | Johnny Grunge | 1993–1996 | |
| Bobby Eaton ^{†} | Bobby Eaton | 1994-1995 | |
| Sid Eudy ^{†} | Sid / Sid Vicious | 1999 | |
| Lance Evers | Lance Storm | 1997–2000 | |
| Eiji Ezaki ^{†} | Hayabusa | 1998 | |
| Brian Fabian | Mr. Anthony | 1992 | |
| Ed Farhat ^{†} | The Sheik | 1994 | |
| Solofa Fatu, Jr. | Fatu | 1992-1996 | |
| Rick Federico | Spiros Greco | 1996 | |
| David Ferrier ^{†} | Jimmy Del Ray | 1995–1996 | |
| Mick Foley | Cactus Jack | 1994 (Note: Part of WCW talent exchange.) 1994–1996 | |
| Chris Ford | Devon Storm / Chris Ford | 1994; 1996 | |
| Nelson Frazier, Jr. ^{†} | Mabel | 1998 | |
| Tatsumi Fujinami | Tatsumi Fujinami | 1992 | |
| Jim Fullington | The Sandman / Mr. Sandman | 1992–1998; 1999–2001 | |
| Dory Funk, Jr. | Dory Funk, Jr. | 1994; 1997 | |
| Terry Funk ^{†} | Terry Funk | 1993–1994; 1995; 1996–1997 | |
| Doug Furnas ^{†} | Doug Furnas | 1996; 1997–1998 | |
| Raymond Gajtkowski ^{†} | Lost Boy Yar | 1997 | |
| Rafael García | Super Caló | 1999 | |
| Scott Garland | Scott Taylor | 1997 | |
| Marty Garner | Puck Dupp | 1999–2000 | |
| Sidney Garrison | Rip Sawyer | 1992 | |
| Terry Gerin | Rhino | 1999–2001 | |
| Alex Gibson | Alex G | 1995 | |
| Duane Gill | Duane Gill | 1993–1994 | |
| Doug Gilbert | The Dark Patriot / Freddie Krueger | 1993 | |
| Eddie Gilbert, Jr. ^{†} | Eddie Gilbert | 1993 | |
| Leonardo Gómez | Damián 666 | 1996 | |
| Terry Gordy ^{†} | Terry Gordy | 1996-1999 | |
| Seiji Goto ^{†} | Tarzan Goto | 1996 | |
| George Gray | One Man Gang | 1997–1999 | |
| Sal E. Graziano | Big Sal E. Graziano | 1998–2000 | |
| Vic Grimes | Grimes / Vic Grimes | 1999–2000 | |
| Eddie Guerrero Llanes ^{†} | Eddie Guerrero | 1995-1996 | |
| Héctor Guerrero Llanes | Héctor Guerrero | 1995-1996 | |
| Oscar Gutierrez | Rey Misterio, Jr. | 1995–1997 | |
| Scott Hall^{†} | Scott Hall | 2000 | |
| Mike Hallick^{†} | Bruiser Mastino | 1995 | |
| Hiroaki Hamada | Gran Hamada | 1997–1998 | |
| Chris Hamrick | Chris Hamrick | 2000–2001 | |
| James Heaney | Jimmy Shoulders | 1997; 1999 | |
| Bret Hanmer | Big Dick Hertz | 1999 | |
| John Hansen II | Stan Hansen | 1993 | |
| William Happer | Bo Dupp | 1999–2000 | |
| Barry Hardy | Barry Hardy | 1997 | |
| Don Harris | Don Harris | 1994; 1996 | |
| Jason Harris | The Dirt Bike Kid / The Shark Attack Kid | 1996–1997 | |
| Ron Harris | Ron Harris | 1994; 1996 | |
| Donald Haviland ^{†} | Hack Meyers | 1994–1997; 1998 | |
| William J. Hawkins ^{†} | Billy Firehawk | 1994 | |
| David Heath | The Vampire Warrior | 1995; 1997 | |
| Michael Hegstrand ^{†} | Road Warrior Hawk | 1993–1994 | |
| Brian Heffron | The Blue Boy / The Blue Meanie | 1995–1998; 2000 | |
| Jason Helton | Jason Helton | 1996 | |
| Greg Herman | Demon Hellstorm | 1995 | |
| Eduardo Hernández | Juventud Guerrera | 1995-1996 | |
| Ikuto Hidaka | Ikuto Hidaka | 1999 | |
| John Hindley | Johnny Smith | 1996; 1998–1999 | |
| Michael Howell | Jack Dupp | 1999–2000 | |
| Curtis Hughes | Mr. Hughes | 1993–1996 | |
| Devon Hughes | D-Von Dudley | 1996–1999 | |
| Frank Huguelet | Rick Rage | 1996 | |
| Martin Hutter | Michael Kovac | 1998 | |
| Matt Hyson | Spike Dudley | 1996–2001 | |
| Chris Irvine | Chris Jericho | 1996-1998 | |
| Barney Irwin | Bill Irwin | 2000 | |
| Fredrick Jannetty | Marty Jannetty | 1995 | |
| Jimmy Jannetty | Jimmy Jannetty | 1992–1994 | |
| Joseph B. Johnson | Vladimir Markoff | 1992 | |
| William Jones | Chilly Willy | 2000–2001 | |
| Yukihiro Kanemura | Kintaro Kanemura / W*ING Kanemura | 1997; 1999–2000 | |
| Mark Keenan | Cody Michaels | 1996–1997 | |
| Patrick Kelly | H.D. Ryder | 1992–1993 | |
| Jake Kemmerer | Bad Crew #1 / Dog | 1996–1997 | |
| Pat Kenney | Simon Diamond / Lance Diamond | 1998–2001 | |
| Yoshiko Kimura ^{†} | Gran Naniwa | 1997–1998 | |
| Michael Kirchner ^{†} | Super Leather | 1999 | |
| Christopher Klucsarits ^{†} | Chris Canyon | 1994 | |
| Brian Knighton ^{†} | Axl Rotten | 1993–1999 | |
| Matt Knowles | H.C. Loc | 1999–2001 | |
| Hiroyoshi Kotsubo | Tsubo Genjin | 1995 | |
| Roger Kuhn | Muskteer | 2000 | |
| Eric Kulas ^{†} | Mass Transit | 1996 | |
| Philip Lafond | Phil Lafon | 1996–1997 | |
| Tom Laughlin | Tommy Dreamer | 1992–2001 | |
| Paul Lauria | Paul Lauria | 1994–1995; 1996 | |
| Jerry Lawler | Jerry Lawler | 1997 | |
| Brian Harris | Brian Lee | 1996–1997 | |
| Scott Levy | Raven | 1995–1997; 1999–2000 | |
| Phil Livelsberger | Max Thrasher | 1992–1993 | |
| Mike Lockwood ^{†} | Erin O'Grady | 1997 | |
| Vito LoGrasso | Skull / Vito LoGrasso / Skull Von Krush | 1999 | |
| Mark LoMonaco | Bubba Ray Dudley / Buh Buh Ray Dudley / Mongo | 1995–1999 | |
| Mike Lozansky ^{†} | Mike Lozansky / Mike Anthony | 1998–1999 | |
| Martin Lunde | Arn Anderson | 1994 | |
| Jerry Lynn | Jerry Lynn | 1997–2001 | |
| James Manley | Jim Powers | 1994–1995 | |
| Michael Manna | Stevie Richards / Big Stevie Cool / Steve Richards | 1992; 1994–1997; 1997 | |
| Lou Marconi | Lou Marconi | 1997–1998 | |
| James Maritato | Guido Maritato / Little Guido / Damien Stone | 1992–2001 | |
| Pablo Marquez | Pablo Márquez / El Puerto Riqueño / Ubas | 1995–1997; 1998; 1999 | |
| Tom Marquez | Tom Marquez / Prodigy | 1998–2001 | |
| Troy Martin | Shane Douglas | 1993–1995; 1996–1999 | |
| Salvatore Martino^{†} | Salvatore Bellomo / Super Destroyer #3 / Wildman Bellomo | 1992–1994; 1996 | |
| Mitsuhiro Matsunaga | Mitsuhiro Matsunaga | 1993 | |
| Tony Matteo | The Broad Street Bully / Tony Stetson | 1992–1996 | |
| Michael Mayo, Sr. | Bodyguard For Hire | 1994 | |
| Dan McDevitt | Cpl. Punishment | 1997 | |
| Walt McDonald ^{†} | Crybaby Waldo | 1992 | |
| Angel Medina | Angel / The Spanish Angel | 1997–2001 | |
| Anthony Michaels | Snot Dudley | 1995 | |
| Rick Michaels | The Super Ninja | 1992–1993 | |
| Butch Miller^{†} | Bushwhacker Butch | 1998 | |
| Jeff Miller ^{†} | The Metal Maniac | 1992–1993 | |
| Karl Moffat | Jason The Terrible | 1995 | |
| Carlos Moises | Konnan | 1995–1996 | |
| Jorge Moraza | Jorge Estrada | 2000 | |
| Dan Morrison | Danny Doring / Danny Morrison | 1996–2001 | |
| Ricky Morton | Ricky Morton | 1997 | |
| Masayoshi Motegi | Mr. Motegi | 1993 | |
| Louis Mucciolo, Jr. ^{†} | Louie Spicolli | 1996–1997 | |
| Don Muraco | Don Muraco | 1992–1993 | |
| Masanori Murakawa | The Great Sasuke | 1997–1998 | |
| Dick Murdoch ^{†} | Dick Murdoch | 1993 | |
| Jamal Mustafa | Mr. Mustafa / Mustafa | 1995–1997; 1999 | |
| Ulf Nadrowski | Ulf Hermann | 1998-1999 | |
| Koji Nakagawa | Koji Nakagawa | 1995 | |
| Jim Neidhart ^{†} | Jim Neidhart | 1992; 1993; 1995 | |
| Paul Neu | Neuz / P.N. Neuz | 1999 | |
| Osamu Nishimura ^{†} | Osamu Nishimura | 1994–1995 | |
| Michael Norman | Mike Norman | 1993–1995 | |
| Kevin Northcutt | Kevin Northcutt | 1998 | |
| Paul Olsek, Jr. | Bad Crew #2 / Rose | 1996–1997 | |
| Len Olson | Dr. Luther | 1998 | |
| Atsushi Onita | Atsushi Onita | 1998 | |
| Ricky Santana | Ricky Santana | 1999 | |
| Glen Osbourne | Glen Osbourne | 1992–1993 | |
| Matt Osborne ^{†} | Borne Again / Doink The Clown | 1994 | |
| Takeo Otsuka | Terry Boy | 1997 | |
| Carl Oulette | Jean-Pierre LaFitte | 2000 | |
| Chris Pallies ^{†} | King Kong Bundy | 1993–1994 | |
| John Parsonage | Dino Devine | 2000 | |
| Ben Peacock | Uganda | 1999 | |
| Miguel Pérez, Jr. | Miguelito Pérez / Miguel Pérez, Jr. | 1993 | |
| Oreal Perras^{†} | Ivan Koloff | 1992 | |
| Josip Peruzovic^{†} | Nikolai Volkoff | 1992; 1993 | |
| A. J. Petrucci | Super Destroyer #1 | 1992–1993 | |
| Ted Petty ^{†} | Rocco Rock | 1993–1996 | |
| Bill Pierce | Chris Michaels / Sir Richard Michaels | 1992–1993; 1996 | |
| Brian Pillman ^{†} | Brian Pillman | 1994; 1996 | |
| Jacus Plisken | Bio-Hazard | 2000 | |
| Peter Polaco | Justin Credible / PG-187 | 1997–2001 | |
| Al Poling | 911 | 1993–1996; 1998 | |
| Kent Porter | Lupus | 1997 | |
| Rod Price | Rod Price | 1998–1999 | |
| Tom Prichard | Tom Prichard | 1995; 1997 | |
| Val Puccio ^{†} | Big Val Puccio / Big Malley | 1995 | |
| Bay Ragni | Chubby Dudley / E.Z. Rider | 1995–1999 | |
| Jonathan Rechner ^{†} | Balls Mahoney | 1996–2001 | |
| Robert Rechsteiner | Rick Steiner | 1995 | |
| Scott Rechsteiner | Scott Steiner | 1995 | |
| James Reiher ^{†} | Jimmy Snuka | 1992–1994 | |
| Ernie Ribeiro | Ernesto Benefica / Herve' Renesto | 1992–1993 | A running gag was announcers mispronouncing his Benefica character, leading some sources to misspell it Benefico |
| Thomas Richardson | Tommy Rich | 1996–2000 | |
| Ken Rinehurst | Jack Victory | 1998–2001 | |
| Slyvester Ritter ^{†} | Junkyard Dog | 1993; 1998 | |
| Alex Rizzo ^{†} | Big Dick Dudley | 1995–1999 | |
| James Rocha | Jim Steele / Wolf Hawkfield | 1995; 1998 | |
| Jesus Rodriguez | Jesús Cristóbal | 1999 | |
| Wendell Rozier ^{†} | Death Row 3260 | 1995 | |
| Francisco Rueda | Super Crazy | 1998–2001 | |
| Virgil Runnels Jr. ^{†} | Dusty Rhodes | 2000 | |
| Glen Ruth | The Spider / Spider #1 | 1994 | |
| Kazuo Sakurada ^{†} | Kendo Nagasaki | 1996 | |
| José Saldaña | Papi Chulo | 1999 | |
| Ray Samalonis | Ray Odyssey | 1993; 1994 | |
| Manuel Santiago | Headhunter B / Mahim | 1996 | |
| Victor Santiago | Headhunter A / Mofat | 1996 | |
| Michael Santoni, Jr. | Big Guido / Primo Carnera III | 1995–1996 | |
| Allen Sarven | Al Snow | 1994–1995; 1997 | |
| Bruno Sassi | Bruno Sassi | 1994–1995 | |
| Shigeki Sato | Dick Togo | 1997 | |
| Perry Satullo | Perry Saturn / Saturn | 1995–1997 | |
| Charles Scaggs | 2 Cold Scorpio | 1994–1996; 1998; 1999; 2000 | |
| John Schmitz | John Diamond | 1996 | |
| Jason Seguine | Buck Quartermaine | 1999 | |
| Peter Senerchia | Taz / The Tazmaniac | 1993–1999; 2000 | |
| Keith Sheara | Keith Scherer / Kyle Scherer | 1993–1994 | |
| Kensuke Shinzaki | Jinsei Shinzaki | 1998 | |
| Larry Shreve | Abdullah The Butcher | 1993 | |
| Ron Simmons | Ron Simmons | 1994–1995 | |
| Dean Simon | Dean Malenko | 1994–1995 | |
| Joseph Simon | Joe Malenko | 1994–1995 | |
| Chad Slivenski | Chad Austin / Blue Mask | 1993–1996 | |
| Norman Smiley | Norman Smiley | 1995 | |
| Aurelian Smith, Jr. | Jake Roberts | 1997; 1998 | |
| Davey Boy Smith ^{†} | Davey Boy Smith | 1992–1993 | |
| John T. Smith | J.T. Smith | 1992–1996; 1998 | |
| Timothy Smith ^{†} | Rex King | 1998 | |
| Tracy Smothers^{†} | Tracy Smothers | 1997–1999 | |
| Merced Solis | Tito Santana | 1993 | |
| Lester Speight | Rasta The Voodoo Man | 1992 | |
| Jason Spence | Christian York | 2000–2001 | |
| Charles Spencer | Tony Mamaluke | 2000–2001 | |
| Doug Stahl | Super Destroyer #2 | 1992–1993 | |
| Bob Starr | Bob Starr | 1993; 1994 | |
| Kevin Sullivan ^{†} | Kevin Sullivan | 1993–1994 | |
| Rob Szatkowski | Rob Van Dam | 1996–2001 | |
| Terry Szopinski | The Warlord | 1993 | |
| Yoshihiro Tajiri | Yoshihiro Tajiri | 1998–2001 | |
| Keiji Takayama | Gedo | 2000 | |
| Masato Tanaka | Masato Tanaka | 1998; 1999–2000 | |
| Pat Tanaka | Pat Tanaka | 1993–1994; 2000 | |
| Adolfo Tapia | La Parka | 1995 | |
| Mike Tartaglia | Michael Bruno | 1992 | |
| Charles Taylor | Chaz Taylor | 2000 | |
| Paul Taylor III | Terry Taylor | 1992 | |
| Dionicio Torres | Psicosis | 1995; 2000 | |
| Jerry Tuite ^{†} | The Hellraiser | 1997; 1998; 2000 | |
| Paul Varelans ^{†} | Paul Varelans | 1996 | |
| Frank Vizi | Bull Pain | 1995 | |
| David Volpe | King Kaluha | 1992 | |
| Chris Walker | Chris Walker | 1998 | |
| Charles Warrington | Spider #2 | 1994 | |
| John Watson | Mikey Whipwreck / Young Dragon #2 | 1994–1998; 1999–2001 | |
| Erik Watts | Erik Watts | 2000 | |
| Johnny Weiss | Johnny Hotbody / Sir Jonathan Hotbody | 1992–1993; 1993–1995 | |
| William White, Jr. | Billy Black | 1996 | |
| Brian Wickens | Bushwhacker Luke | 1998 | |
| Josh Wilcox | Josh Wilcox | 2000 | |
| Billy Wiles | Wild Bill / Bill Wiles / Bilvis Wesley | 1997–2001 | |
| Chuck Williams ^{†} | The Rockin' Rebel / Mr. X / The Dark Ninja | 1992–1994 | |
| John Williams | Ian Rotten | 1993–1995 | |
| Steve Williams ^{†} | "Dr. Death" Steve Williams | 1996–1997 | |
| Kendall Windham | Kendall Windham | 1995 | |
| Larry Winters ^{†} | Larry Winters / Mr. X (II) | 1992–1994 | |
| Brian Wohl | Julio Dinero / Julio Sánchez / Julio (S.) Fantastico | 1999–2001 | |
| Daniel Wolfe ^{†} | Lost Boy Wolf | 1997 | |
| Gary Wolfe | Gary Wolfe / Pit Bull #1 / The Pit Bull / Pit Bull Spike | 1992–2000 | |
| Kelly Wolfe | Wolfie D / La Wolfa | 1997; 1998 | |
| Chris Wright | C.W. Anderson | 1999–2001 | |
| Yoshihiro Yamazaki | Tiger Mask | 1997 | |
| Doug Yasinsky | Doug Flex | 1995 | |
| Takao Yoshida | Taka Michinoku | 1997; 1999 | |
| Jerome Young ^{†} | New Jack | 1995–2000 | |

=== Female wrestlers ===
| Birth name: | Ring name(s): | Tenure: | Notes |
|---|---|---|---|
| Unknown | Molly McShane | 1993 | |
| Unknown | Tigra | 1992–1993 | |
| Reggie Bennett | Reggie Bennett | 1997 | |
| Malia Hosaka | Malia Hosaka | 1993 | |
| Carlene Moore-Begnaud | Jazz | 1999–2000 | |
| Gertrude Vachon ^{†} | Luna Vachon | 1995 | |

=== Managers, valets, and entourage members ===
| Birth name: | Ring name(s): | Tenure: | Notes |
|---|---|---|---|
| Unknown | Julio Caesar Valentino Alfonso | 1996–1997 | |
| Unknown | Lady Alexandra | 1996 | |
| Unknown | Miss Patricia | 1996–1997 | |
| Unknown | Penny Pulsations | 1994 | |
| Donna Adamo | Elektra | 1999–2001 | |
| Angel Amoroso | Angel | 1993–1994 | |
| Nicole Bass ^{†} | Nicole Bass | 1998–1999 | |
| Stephanie Bellars | George | 2000–2001 | |
| Nancy Benoit ^{†} | Woman | 1993–1995 | |
| Andy Blacksmith ^{†} | Andy Blacksmith | 2000 | New Hampshire radio personality |
| Rhea Calaveras | Jasmine St. Claire | 2000 | |
| Todd Clem | Bubba The Love Sponge | 2000 | Florida radio personality |
| Jim Cornette | Jim Cornette | 1997 | |
| Lou D'Angeli | Lou E. Dangerously / Sign Guy Dudley | 1995–2001 | |
| Amy Dumas | Angelica / Miss Congeniality | 1999 | |
| Rob Feinstein | 7-11 | 1997 | |
| Francine Fournier | Francine | 1994 1995–2001 | |
| Lori Fullington | Lori Fullington / Miss Peaches | 1992-1994; 1996–1997; 2000 | |
| Tyler Fullington | Tyler Fullington | 1996–1997; 2000 | |
| Jonathan Gilbert | Weasel | 2000 | Wisconsin radio personality |
| Trisa Hayes | Beulah McGillicutty | 1995–1998 | |
| Paul Heyman | Paul E. Dangerously | 1993–2001 | |
| Melissa Hiatt | Missy Hyatt | 1996 | |
| Robin Hunt ^{†} | Hunter Q. Robbins, III | 1992–1994 | |
| Jeff Jones | Judge Jeff Jones | 1999–2000 | |
| Ronald Knight | Jason / Jason Knight | 1993–1995; 1997–1999 | |
| Kristina Laum | Kimona Wanalaya | 1996 | |
| Elena Lyons | Elena Rosaia | 1999-2000 | |
| Anthony Magliaro ^{†} | Tony Rumble | 1993 | |
| Sherri Martel ^{†} | Sensational Sherri | 1993-1994 | |
| Jenna Massoli | Jenna Jameson | 1997; 1998 | |
| Robin Kelly McKendrick | Vivacious Veronica | 1992 | |
| James Mitchell | The Sinister Minister | 2000–2001 | |
| Angel Orsini | The Prodigette | 2000–2001 | |
| Dawn Psaltis | Dawn Marie / Tammy Lynn Bytch | 1999–2001 | |
| Víctor Quiñones ^{†} | Víctor Quiñones | 1993 | |
| Denise Riffle | Chastity | 1997–1998 | |
| Thomas Rodman | Thomas Rodman | 1997 | |
| Howard Saunders ^{†} | The Cosmic Commander | 1994 | |
| William Sierra | Bill Alfonso | 1995–2001 | |
| Tammy Lynn Sytch | Tammy Lynn Sytch | 1998-1999 | |
| Lance Wright | Mr. Wright | 1995–1997 | |

=== Commentators and interviewers ===
| Birth name: | Ring name(s): | Tenure: | Notes |
|---|---|---|---|
| Joseph Bonsignore | Joey Styles | 1993–2001 | |
| Don Callis | Cyrus | 1999–2001 | |
| Matt DeMatt | Matty in the House! | 1993-1994; 2000 | |
| Joel Gertner | Joel Gertner | 1995–2001 | |
| Elena Lyons | Elena Rosaia | 1999-2000 | |
| Stephen Prazak | Stephen Prazak | 1999–2000 | |
| Richard Rood ^{†} | Rick Rude | 1996–1997 | |
| Ernie Santilli | Stately Wayne Manor | 1992–1993 | |
| Jay Sulli | Jay "Six Pack" Sulli | 1993–1994 | |
| Stephen C. Truitt | Stevie Wonderful | 1992–1993 | also the TV show's composer in 1992–93, credited by his real name |

=== Referees ===
| Birth name: | Ring name(s): | Tenure: | Notes |
|---|---|---|---|
| Bill Cenegy | Billy Saints | 1998-1999 | |
| Danny Daniels | Danny Daniels | 2000 | |
| John Finegan | John Finegan | 1992–2001 | |
| Brian Hildebrand ^{†} | Brian Hildebrand | 1995–1996 | |
| Alan Haugabook | A.T. Huck | 1999 | |
| Mike Kehner | Mike Kehner | 2000 | |
| Kevin Lawler | Kevin Christian / Freddie Gilbert | 1993 | |
| Jim Molineaux | Jim Molineaux | 1992–2001 | |
| John "Peewee" Moore | John Moore | 1994–2000 | |

=== Other personnel ===
| Birth name: | Ring name(s): | Tenure: | Notes |
|---|---|---|---|
| Unknown | Mitch | 1999–2001 | Personal ring announcer for Simon Diamond. |
| Bob Artese | Bob Artese | 1993–1999 | Ring announcer |
| Stephen DeAngelis | Stephen DeAngelis | 1999–2000 | Ring announcer |
| Tod Gordon | Tod Gordon | 1992–1996 | Promoter, various on-air roles |
| Harry Grivas | Harry Slash | 1997–2001 | ECW Music Producer |
| Rocco Musciano | Rocco Musciano | Dates uncertain | Timekeeper |
| Eric Tuttle | Towel Boy | 1999–2001 | Timekeeper and towel boy |

Company name to Year
| Company name: | Years: |
|---|---|
| Eastern Championship Wrestling | 1992–1993 |
| NWA Eastern Championship Wrestling | 1993–1994 |
| Extreme Championship Wrestling | 1994–2001 |
Notes
^{†} Indicates they are deceased.
^{‡} Indicates they died while they were employed with ECW.
