= Extreme Championship Wrestling =

Defunct American professional wrestling company

- Acronym: ECW
- Founded: February 25, 1992
- Defunct: April 4, 2001 (de facto); January 31, 2007 (de jure)
- Style: Hardcore wrestling
- Headquarters: Philadelphia, Pennsylvania, U.S.; Corporate offices in Scarsdale, New York, U.S.
- Founder(s): Tod Gordon (Eastern Championship Wrestling); Paul Heyman (Extreme Championship Wrestling)
- Owner(s): Tod Gordon (1992–1995); HHG Corporation (1995–2001); WWE (WWE Libraries) (2003–present)
- Formerly: Eastern Championship Wrestling
- Predecessor: Tri-State Wrestling Alliance
- Successor: Official: ECW (WWE brand); Unofficial: Pro-Pain Pro Wrestling; Hardcore Homecoming; Extreme Rising; House of Hardcore
- Website: ECW on WWE.com

Extreme Championship Wrestling (ECW) was an American professional wrestling promotion that was based in Philadelphia, Pennsylvania, and operated by its parent company HHG Corporation. The promotion was founded in 1992 by Tod Gordon as National Wrestling Alliance (NWA) affiliate Eastern Championship Wrestling. The following year, businessman and wrestling manager Paul Heyman took over the creative end of the promotion from Eddie Gilbert. Under Heyman, the promotion was rechristened as Extreme Championship Wrestling.

The promotion was known for highlighting a "hardcore wrestling" style, with matches regularly featuring weapons (including the frequent use of chairs, tables, and fire) and revolving around adult-themed storylines. Though the hardcore style was the main focus, ECW also showcased various international styles of professional wrestling not usually seen in the U.S., ranging from Mexican lucha libre to Japanese puroresu. Heyman's creative direction created new stars, and established ECW as the third major national wrestling promotion in the United States in the second half of the 1990s, competing with the World Wrestling Federation (WWF, now WWE) and World Championship Wrestling (WCW). The promotion debuted on national television in 1999 with the weekly show ECW on TNN.

ECW held its final events in January 2001, shortly before its parent company folded when it was unable to secure a new national TV contract. The World Wrestling Entertainment, Inc. (WWE) purchased the assets of the company from bankruptcy in January 2003. Following the success of the One Night Stand tribute show in 2005, WWE relaunched ECW as a third brand in 2006 alongside their existing Raw and SmackDown brands, producing ECW on Sci-Fi for close to four years until it aired its final episode in 2010, on the rebranded Syfy.

== Style and presentation ==
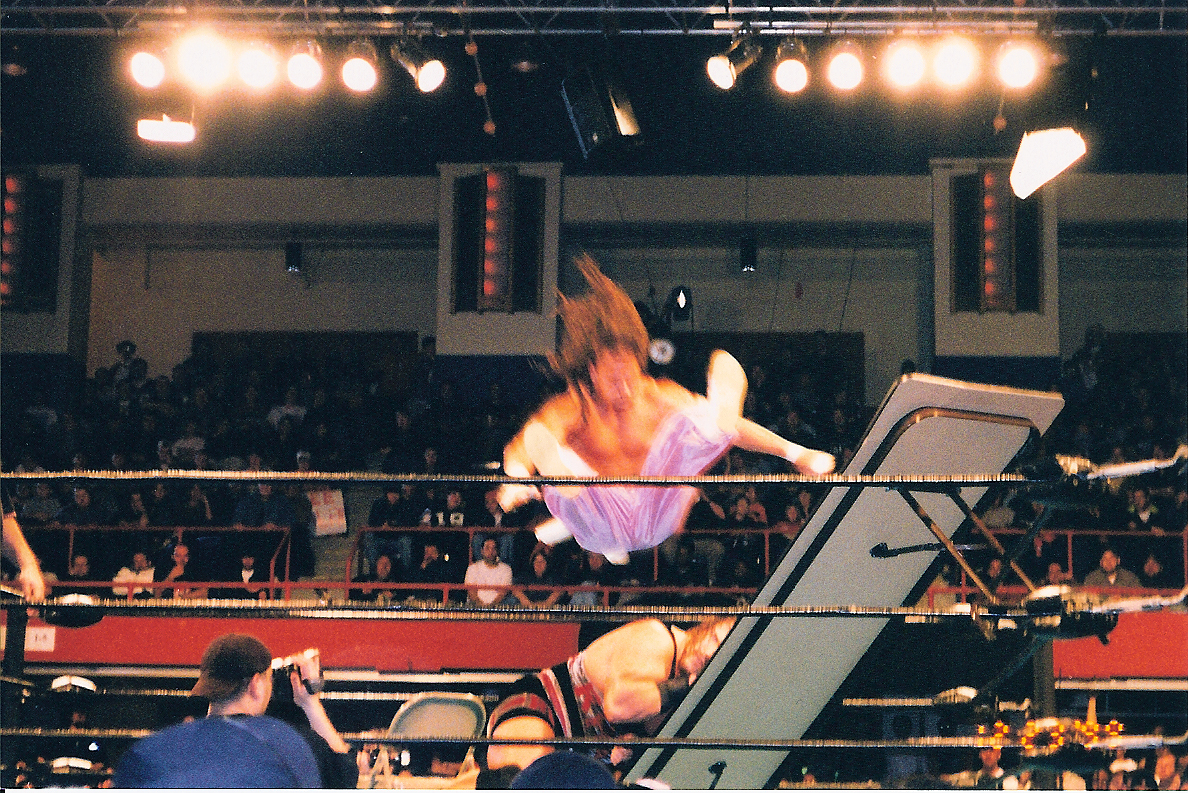
ECW became known for its hardcore style, frequently incorporating weapons into matches. Sabu (putting Rhino through a table in this picture) especially was connected with this practice.

Following the lead of the World Wrestling Federation, the majority of American professional wrestling promotions in the 1980s and early 1990s orientated their style and presentation towards catering to mainstream audiences, families and casual fans. However, under the creative direction of Paul Heyman, ECW rebranded itself as "Extreme Championship Wrestling" in 1994 and orientated its entire style and presentation towards a gritty, counter-cultural, underground-style presentation directly inspired by the emerging cultural forces of grunge music, hip-hop and extreme sports. In contrast to clean-cut wrestling shows centred around "superhero" archetypes, ECW pioneered the use of adult-orientated shows featuring high levels of violence, vulgarity, and sexuality centred around anti-hero characters to develop a niche separate to that of its peers. ECW further accentuated the raucous atmosphere of its shows through the use of contemporary chart music instead of using stock music; the performers in ECW would make their entrances accompanied by the music of artists such as Metallica, Alice in Chains, Pearl Jam, Dr. Dre and Ice Cube.

Although the concept of "hardcore wrestling" (a style of professional wrestling associated with the use of objects as weapons) did not originate with ECW, they were widely credited with popularizing the style in the United States and were intimately associated with it. Although hardcore wrestling became the calling card of the promotion, ECW has also been credited with helping to introduce other professional wrestling styles such as lucha libre and puroresu to the American audience.

== History ==
=== 1989–1994: Origins, founding, and NWA membership ===
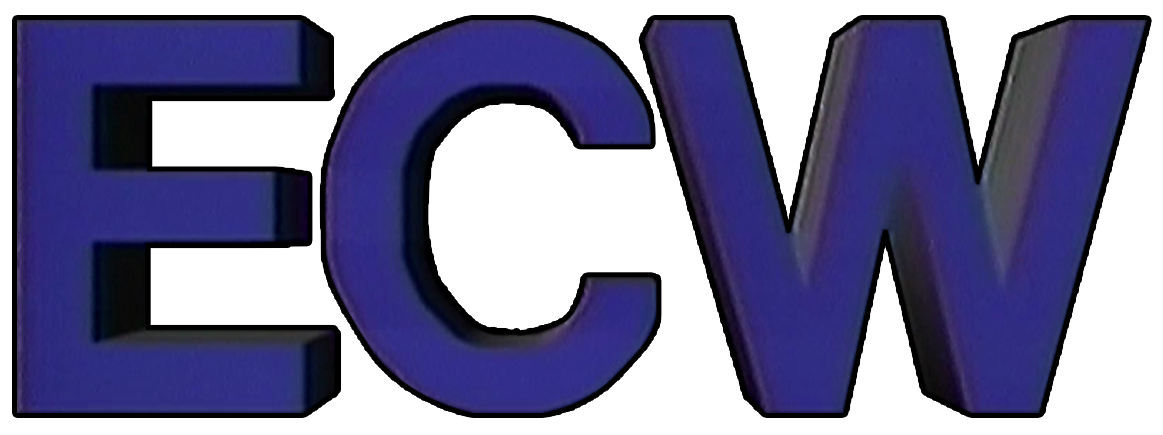
Eastern Championship Wrestling logo.

Based in the working-class city of Philadelphia, ECW had its origins in 1989 under the banner Tri-State Wrestling Alliance (TWA) owned by Joel Goodhart. In 1992, Goodhart sold his share of the company to his partner, Tod Gordon, who created his own promotion from TWA's remnants, Eastern Championship Wrestling (ECW). When Eastern Championship Wrestling was founded, it was not a member of the National Wrestling Alliance (NWA), though it joined the alliance on September 3 1993 at the behest of its lead booker "Hot Stuff" Eddie Gilbert. Gilbert, through his position as lead booker of ECW, managed to secure television time on SportsChannel Philadelphia starting in April 1993. Gilbert, after a falling out with Tod Gordon, was replaced in September 1993 by then-28-year-old businessman Paul Heyman. Heyman, known in professional wrestling as Paul E. Dangerously, had just been fired by World Championship Wrestling (WCW) and was looking for a new challenge.

Heyman's creative influence had an immediate impact on ECW, and throughout 1993 and into 1994 the terms "Hardcore" and "Extreme" were increasingly used to characterize both the in-ring style and the general presentation of the promotion. Instead of relying on former WWF stars such as Jimmy Snuka, Heyman pivoted the promotion to centering around local up-and-coming talents such as Shane Douglas, Sabu, The Sandman and Tommy Dreamer.

=== 1994: Secession from the NWA ===
Shane Douglas threw down the NWA World Heavyweight Championship in favor of the ECW World Heavyweight Championship in 1994

By 1994 ECW was proving to be the strongest member of what remained of the National Wrestling Alliance. It was therefore decided by consensus between ECW and the rest of the NWA that ECW's main star, Shane Douglas, would win a tournament to win the vacant NWA Worlds Heavyweight Championship. However, unbeknownst to the NWA, ECW operators Tod Gordon and Paul Heyman secretly planned to use the occasion to publicly break from the NWA and relaunch ECW as its own standalone entity. Gordon and Heyman had lost faith in the NWA to provide any value to them as wrestling promoters. Additionally, instead of offering cooperation and mutual support, other member promotions of the NWA were undermining ECW's business with underhanded tactics, something Gordon and Heyman wanted revenge for.

At the NWA World Title Tournament held on August 27, 1994, Douglas threw down the NWA World Heavyweight Championship title upon winning it, stating that he did not want to be champion of a "dead promotion" that "died seven years ago." He then raised the Eastern Championship Wrestling title belt and declared it to be a World Heavyweight Championship – calling it the only real world title left in professional wrestling. When recalling this event years later, Paul Heyman stated the following in a 1998 chat:

The National Wrestling Alliance was old-school when old-school wasn't hip anymore. We wanted to set our mark, we wanted to break away from the pack, we wanted to let the world know that we weren't just some independent promotion.

NWA representative Dennis Coralluzzo was interviewed after the event and declared that Douglas would be the world champion of the NWA "whether he likes it or not", calling Douglas' actions a "disgrace" and said he would move to have Douglas stripped of both the NWA World Heavyweight Championship and the Eastern Championship Wrestling Heavyweight Championship, as he was "undeserving" of both titles. Gordon made the following announcement on the next edition of ECW programming:

I listened with great interest as the representative of the NWA board of directors took it upon himself to inform you that they have the power to force NWA-Eastern Championship Wrestling not to recognize The Franchise, Shane Douglas, as a world heavyweight champion. Well, as of noon today, I have folded NWA-Eastern Championship Wrestling. In its place will be ECW- Extreme Championship Wrestling- and we recognize The Franchise, Shane Douglas, as our World Heavyweight Champion. And we encourage any wrestler in the world today to come to the ECW to challenge for that belt. This is the ECW, Extreme Championship Wrestling, changing the face of professional wrestling.

Douglas' metaphorical and literal casting down of the NWA and Gordon's subsequent renaming of the promotion were later considered the definitive beginning of Extreme Championship Wrestling as not just an independent promotion, but a prominent player in American professional wrestling.

=== 1995–1999: Rapid growth and launch of pay-per-view events ===
==== ECW Arena shows and television syndication expansion ====
The logo used on WWE Network for ECW's first weekly television show Hardcore TV

The former ECW Arena as it appeared in 2010. The former "Bingo Hall" was ECW's primary venue for the majority of its existence.

ECW's primary venue was the ECW Arena, a former warehouse secluded under a section of Interstate 95. Seating comprised simple folding chairs and four sets of portable bleachers, with the unconventional scene reflective of the gritty style of the promotion itself. It was from this venue that ECW's TV show ECW Hardcore TV was filmed for broadcast on a Philadelphia local cable sports station (SportsChannel America's local affiliate, SportsChannel Philadelphia) on Tuesday evenings. After Sports Channel Philadelphia went off the air in 1997, the show moved to WPPX-TV 61. It later moved to a former independent broadcast station (WGTW 48) in Philadelphia on either Friday or Saturday night, and at 1:00 a.m. or at 2:00 a.m. Shows were also aired on the MSG Network in New York on Friday nights (early Saturday morning) at 2:00 a.m. Due to the obscurity of the stations and ECW itself, as well as the lack of oversight from the Federal Communications Commission at that late hour, many times expletives and violence were not edited out of these showings, along with extensive use of copyrighted music and music videos.

In 1995, Tod Gordon sold Extreme Championship Wrestling, to his head booker, Paul Heyman, trading as HHG Corporation. Afterward, Gordon remained in ECW as a figurehead commissioner. Years after being the ECW "Commissioner", Gordon left ECW in May 1997; his absence was explained on-air that he retired from wrestling due to family. Rumors circulated, however, that Gordon was fired by Heyman after he was suspected as a "locker room mole" for a rival wrestling promotion, helping to lure talent to World Championship Wrestling.

==== Expansion outside of Philadelphia ====
Prior to 1994, ECW had been a regional promotion with the first event to take place outside of the Northeast being a house show on September 23 at the Florida State Fairgrounds in Tampa, Florida. On January 14, 1995, ECW held its first television taping outside the Northeast when they taped an episode of Hardcore TV in Davie, Florida followed by a second Florida taping in Orlando two days later. On December 29, 1995, ECW made its debut in New York City with the first Holiday Hell supercard event taking place at the Lost Battalion Hall in Queens. New York became one of the largest markets for the promotion's live events outside of Philadelphia, drawing capacity crowds to the Lost Battalion Hall, the Elks Lodge, and the Hammerstein Ballroom.

On August 10 and August 11, 1996, ECW held its first events outside the United States when they teamed up with IWA Japan to present ECW vs. IWA vs. True FMW: Total War at the Yokohama Bunka Gymnasium in Yokohama, Kanagawa, Japan and Korakuen Hall in Tokyo, Japan respectively.

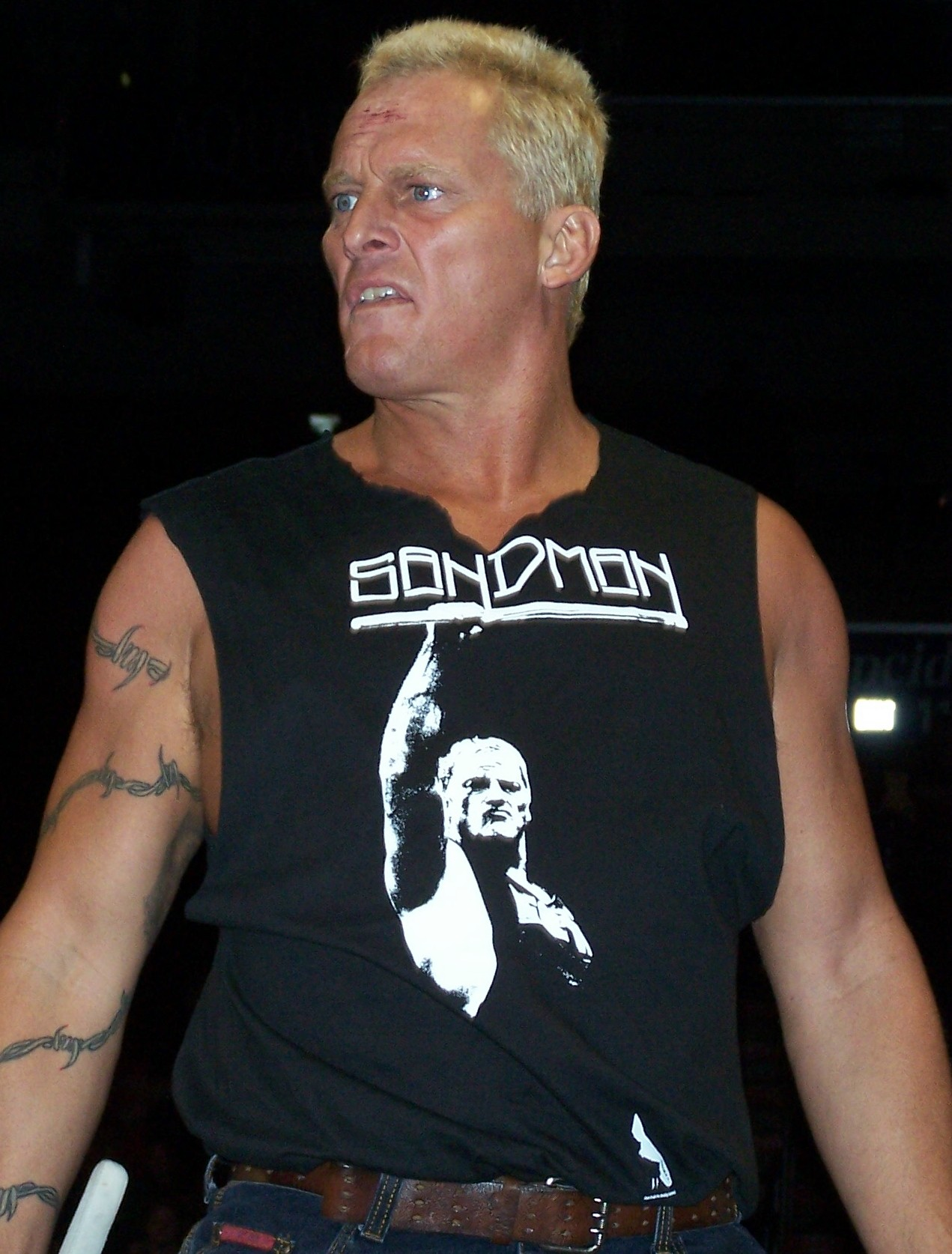
The Sandman held the ECW World Heavyweight Championship a record five times

On August 2, 1998, ECW made its Midwestern United States debut when they presented the Heat Wave pay-per-view from Dayton, Ohio. ECW later made regular touring stops in Midwestern cities like Cleveland, Ohio, Indianapolis, Indiana, Fort Wayne, Indiana, Kansas City, Missouri, Toledo, Ohio, Milwaukee, Wisconsin, Minneapolis, Minnesota, Battle Creek, Michigan, Detroit, Michigan, and Chicago, Illinois either in the city or within the metropolitan area.

On May 12, 2000, ECW made its west coast debut when they presented a live house show during the Electronic Entertainment Expo at the Los Angeles Convention Center in Los Angeles, California as part of a marketing campaign for the ECW Hardcore Revolution video game which was being demoed at the convention. Two months later on July 16, 2000, ECW prsented its first live West coast pay-per-view when they held the 2000 edition of Heat Wave at the Grand Olympic Auditorium in Los Angeles, California.

==== Cross-promotion with the WWF and USWA ====
Storyline-wise, Vince McMahon first became "aware" of ECW while at the 1995 King of the Ring event in ECW's home base of Philadelphia. During the match between Mabel and Savio Vega, the crowd suddenly started to chant, "ECW! ECW! ECW!". On September 22, 1996, at the In Your House: Mind Games event in Philadelphia, ECW stars The Sandman, Tommy Dreamer, Paul Heyman, and Taz were in the front row with Sandman even interfering in one match (when he threw beer on Savio Vega during his strap match with Bradshaw). McMahon acknowledged ECW's status as a local, up-and-coming promotion on the air. The following night on WWF Monday Night RAW, broadcast on September 23, 1996, at the onset of a match between The Bodydonnas vs. The British Bulldog and Owen Hart, Bill Alfonso, and Taz could be seen invading the program. Both Taz and Alfonso were able to successfully jump the security rails, and Taz was able to prominently display a bright orange sign with black lettering that read "Sabu Fears Taz-ECW". On February 24, 1997, ECW "invaded" Raw from the Manhattan Center. They advanced a storyline, plugged their first ever pay-per-view and worked three matches in front of the WWF audience while McMahon called the action with both Jerry "The King" Lawler and Paul Heyman. The Manhattan Center in New York was peppered with a large number of ECW fans, who gave the WWF wrestlers "Boring!" chants when they felt it was warranted. Likewise, when the ECW performers arrived, they popped and introduced the WWF Monday night audience to some trademark ECW group chants. This invasion sparked an inter-promotional feud between ECW and Lawler's United States Wrestling Association. Lawler disparaged ECW on-camera and convinced wrestlers such as Rob Van Dam and Sabu to join him in an anti-ECW crusade. Throughout 1997, ECW wrestlers appeared on USWA television programs, and vice versa. As part of the working relationship between ECW and the WWF, a number of WWF-contracted wrestlers were sent to ECW for seasoning in 1997, including Droz and Brakkus.

==== Gaining access to pay-per-view broadcasting ====
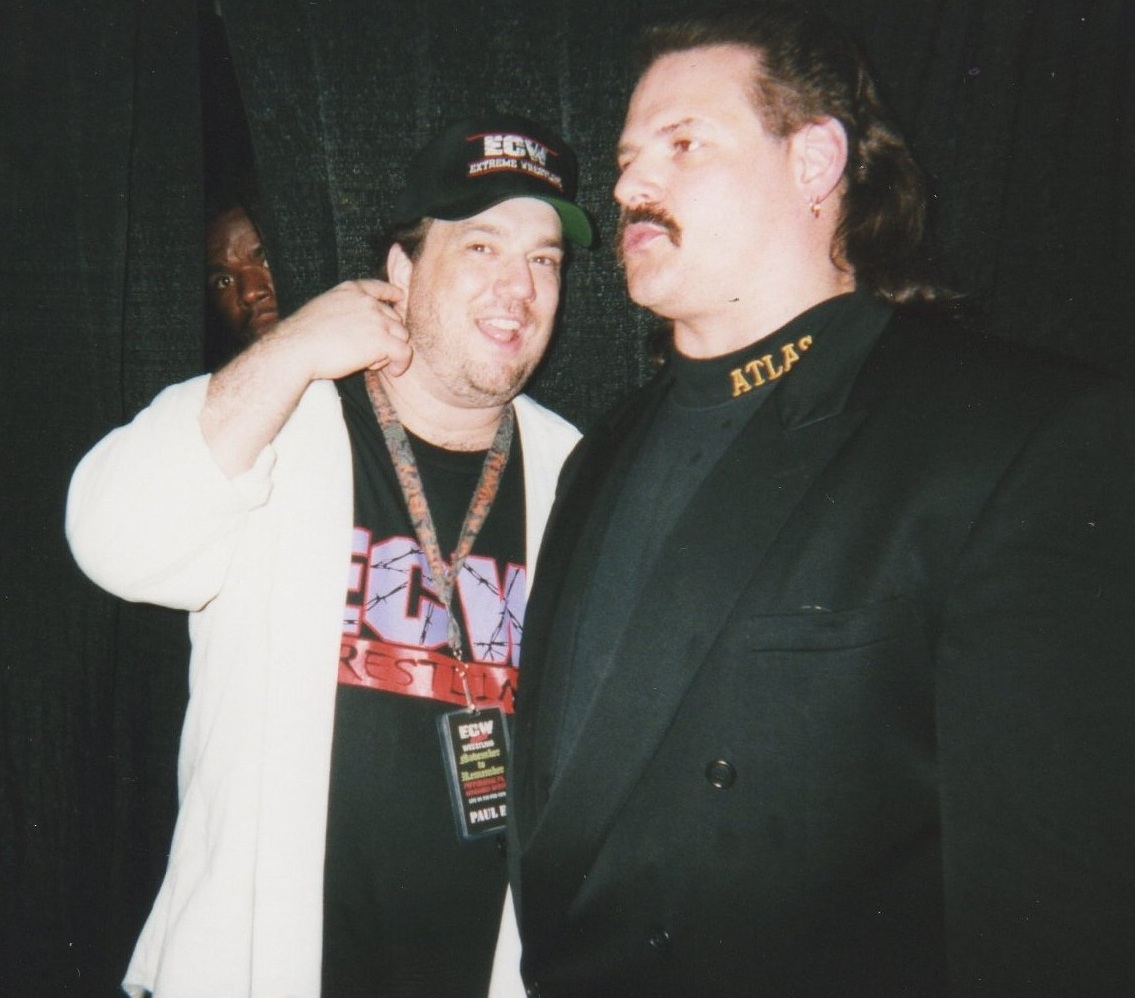
Paul Heyman appears with ECW security guard Ronnie Lang in 1998

After approximately 18 months of negotiating with pay-per-view providers, ECW broadcast their first pay-per-view (PPV) wrestling card, Barely Legal, on April 13, 1997, highlighted by Terry Funk defeating Raven to win the ECW World Heavyweight Championship. Gaining access to PPV was seen both internally and externally as a major milestone for ECW as it added a major revenue stream to the company in addition to greatly expanding the size of the company's audience. Although Barely Legal was broadcast from the ECW arena, ECW's transition to PPV would see ECW gaining access to much larger venues. For example, ECW's November to Remember 1997 PPV just months later saw the company perform before 4,634 fans at the Golden Dome in Monaca, Pennsylvania.

In June 1997, the company's Wrestlepalooza '97 event featured Raven's final ECW match before leaving for WCW. In this match, Tommy Dreamer finally beat Raven, his longtime nemesis. Dreamer's celebration was short-lived, though, as Jerry Lawler, along with Sabu and Rob Van Dam showed up to attack Dreamer. This set up a match between Dreamer and Lawler at the pay-per-view, 1997 Hardcore Heaven, on August 17, which was won by Dreamer. ECW continued through 1998 and early 1999 with a string of successful pay-per-views.

=== 1999–2000: National television and talent departures ===
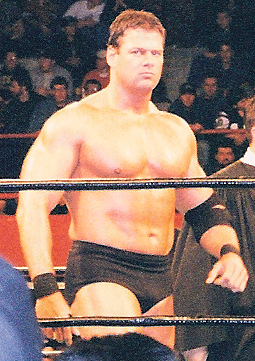
Mike Awesome left ECW for WCW whilst still reigning as ECW World Heavyweight Champion.

In August 1999, ECW began to broadcast nationally on TNN (for what was initially a three-year contract) as ECW on TNN. Despite very limited advertising, a minimal budget, and disputes with TNN (reflected in The Network stable), ECW became TNN's highest rated show and bolstered TNN's Friday night slot, both in ratings and line-up. However, within weeks of debuting on TNN ECW was raided by the WWF, who hired away reigning ECW World Champion Taz as well reigning ECW Tag-team Champions the Dudley Boyz. (Note: ECW on TNN began in August 1999. The Dudleys were signed away that month while Taz had his last full-time match for ECW in September 1999.) Furthermore, in April 2000 reigning ECW World Heavyweight Champion Mike Awesome jumped ship to WCW in a move completely unforeseen by ECW. (Note: Not only did Awesome appear on WCW Monday Nitro, he did so while wearing the ECW World Championship. This was considered a "dirty tactic" by ECW, who sued WCW for featuring a piece of their intellectual property as part of their television show.)

It has been suggested that Awesome refused to sign a new contract with ECW until Paul Heyman paid him overdue wages. There were rumors that WCW Executive Vice-President Eric Bischoff wanted Awesome to drop the ECW World Championship belt in the trash can on television, as had been done previously with the WWF Women's title by Madusa when she jumped from the WWF to WCW. After Paul Heyman filed an injunction, WCW refrained from having Awesome appear on Nitro with the belt, but did acknowledge him as the champion. Eventually, a compromise was reached. Awesome (a WCW employee and the reigning ECW World Heavyweight champion) appeared at an April 13, 2000, ECW event in Indianapolis, Indiana, where he lost the title to Taz (who was working for the World Wrestling Federation). Taz would then lose the title to Tommy Dreamer at CyberSlam 2000 to return the title to ECW's possession, ending what is considered to have been one of the more peculiar arrangements in professional wrestling history.

=== 2000–2001: Cancellation of ECW on TNN and collapse ===
By October 2000, ECW on TNN was cancelled (with the final episode airing on October 6, 2000) in favor of WWF Raw is War moving to TNN. Paul Heyman stated he believed that the inability to land another national television deal was the cause of ECW's demise.

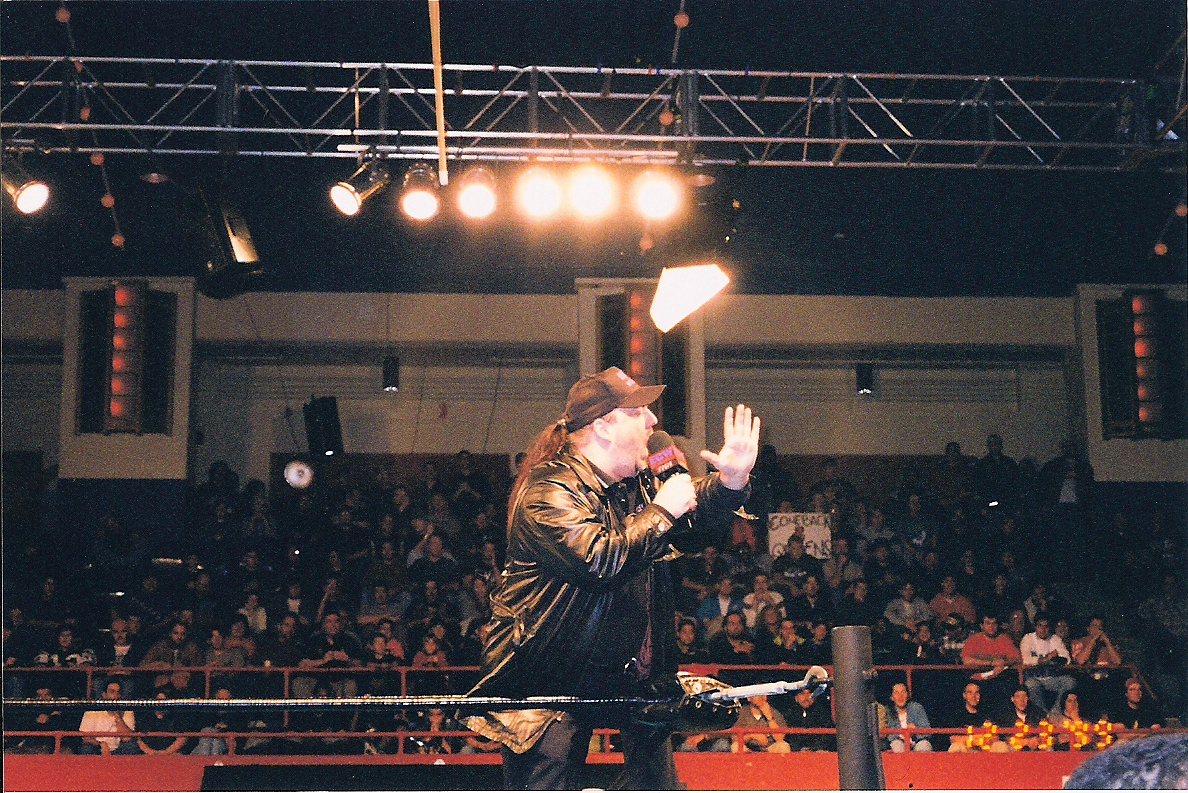
Heyman addressing the crowd at an ECW television taping in 1999

ECW struggled for months after the cancellation, trying to secure a new national television deal. On December 30, 2000, ECW Hardcore TV aired for the last time and the January 7, 2001, broadcast of Guilty as Charged was ECW's last PPV. ECW's January 13, 2001 show in Pine Bluff, Arkansas would prove to be its final event of any kind. Living Dangerously was scheduled to air on March 11, 2001, but because of financial trouble it was canceled in February. Heyman could not get out of financial trouble; the PPV distributors would not pay the money that was owed to ECW due to Heyman still not being able to sign with a TV network. Consequently, ECW closed on April 4, 2001. Heyman, who became color commentator for Raw is War that February (replacing Jerry Lawler, who quit the WWF in protest after his then-wife, Stacy Carter, had been fired by McMahon), had supposedly never told his wrestlers that ECW was on its last legs and was unable to pay them for a while. Heyman also noted in later years that he had made an effort to put ECW on the USA Network (then the former home of Raw is War) unsuccessfully, despite McMahon having sent an email encouraging USA Network executive Steven Chau to add ECW to their programming.

ECW was listed as having assets totalling $1,385,500. Included in that number was $860,000 in accounts receivable owed to ECW by In Demand Network (PPV), Acclaim (video games) and Original San Francisco Toy Company (action figures). The balance of the assets were the video tape library ($500,000), a 1998 Ford truck ($19,500) and the remaining inventory of merchandise ($4). The liabilities of ECW totalled $8,881,435.17. Wrestlers and talent were listed, with amounts owed ranging from $2 for Sabu and Steve Corino to hundreds, and in some cases, thousands of dollars. The highest amounts owed to talents were Rob Van Dam ($150,000), Shane Douglas ($145,000), Tommy Dreamer ($100,000), Joey Styles ($50,480), Rhyno ($50,000), and Francine Fournier ($47,275).

Many ECW wrestlers moved to the World Wrestling All-Stars (WWA), Xtreme Pro Wrestling (XPW), Combat Zone Wrestling (CZW), IWA Mid-South, XWF, Ring of Honor, and Total Nonstop Action Wrestling (TNA) which were all formed after the end of ECW and WCW apart from CZW and XPW which were formed in 1999 and IWA Mid-South which was formed in 1996.

=== 2001–2007: The Invasion and acquisition by WWE ===
A few months after ECW's 2001 demise, ECW resurfaced as a stable as part of the World Wrestling Federation's (WWF, later WWE) Invasion storyline. On the July 9, 2001, edition of Raw is War, Heyman, who had been hired by the WWF as Raw color commentator while ECW was still in bankruptcy proceedings, joined several former ECW alumni on the WWF roster (including the debuting Rob Van Dam and Tommy Dreamer) and claimed that he was bringing ECW back to participate in the Invasion by themselves (at the time, however, the ownership of ECW, including the use of its name on-air, was disputed despite Heyman still technically owning ECW when he jumped ship to the WWF. In addition, WWF faced legal action by Harry Slash & The Slashtones for the use of the song "This Is Extreme!" which was eventually settled). Before Raw is War was over that evening, Heyman and Shane McMahon, who had (kayfabe) purchased World Championship Wrestling (WCW), revealed that they were in cahoots with each other and that Heyman had (also kayfabe) sold ECW to Stephanie McMahon, forming The Alliance to try and wrestle power from Vince McMahon. At that time, the original inter-promotional feud devolved into another internal power struggle among the McMahon family. The defection of WWF superstars to The Alliance continued the shift as less focus was placed on WCW and ECW performers – in fact, with rare exceptions such as Van Dam, the ECW alumni in The Alliance were given even less focus than WCW's performers, with WCW's logo even representing the entire stable. The feud lasted six months and concluded with WWF defeating The Alliance at the 2001 Survivor Series when Kurt Angle attacked Stone Cold Steve Austin, allowing The Rock, who had himself gotten attacked by Chris Jericho during the match (trying to help The Alliance in the process), to get the winning pinfall. The WWF's victory also marked the end of the Invasion storyline and WCW and ECW wrestlers were reintegrated into the WWF.

On January 28, 2003, World Wrestling Entertainment Inc. purchased ECW's assets from HHG Corporation in court, acquiring the rights to ECW's video library. HHG would nominally remain active until it became defunct on January 31, 2007.

== Reunions and revivals ==
=== 2004 Rise and Fall of ECW documentary ===
Following World Wrestling Entertainment Inc.'s purchase of ECW's assets in January 2003, they used the video library to put together a two-disc DVD titled The Rise and Fall of ECW, which was released in November 2004. The main feature of the DVD set was a nearly three-hour documentary on the company's history, with the other disc featuring 7 matches from the promotion. The documentary proved to be one of the most popular pieces of media ever produced by WWE, with DVDs of the documentary selling in the 100,000s.

In June 2005 an unauthorized DVD called Forever Hardcore was written, directed and produced by Jeremy Borash in response to The Rise and Fall of ECW. The DVD featured interviews with ECW alumni who were not employed by WWE telling their side of ECW's history.

The success of Rise and Fall of ECW and Forever Hardcore led to WWE reassessing the value of the ECW brand and directly resulted in WWE hosting ECW One Night Stand 2005 to further test how much strength remained in the ECW fandom.

=== WWE ===
Final ECW logo used by WWE during its relaunch

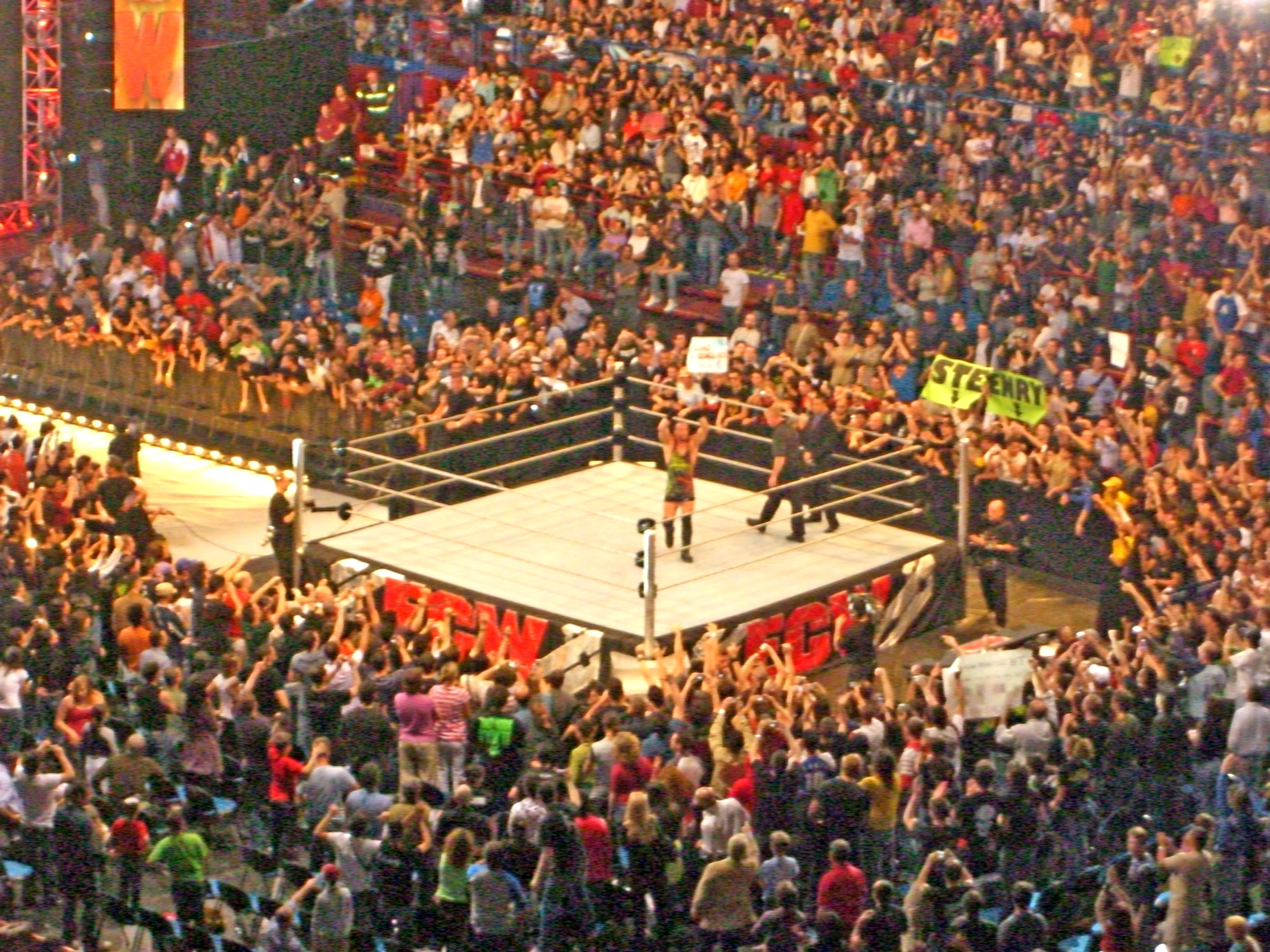
Rob Van Dam in an ECW ring in April 2007, a year after the relaunch

By 2005, WWE began reintroducing ECW through content from the ECW video library and a series of books, which included the release of The Rise and Fall of ECW documentary. With heightened and rejuvenated interest in the ECW franchise, WWE organized ECW One Night Stand on June 12, a reunion event that featured ECW alumni. Shane McMahon had the idea of an online, low budget show, but they asked television stations and PPV producers and they were interested in ECW.

Due to the financial and critical success of the production, WWE produced the second ECW One Night Stand on June 11, 2006, which served as the premiere show of the relaunch of the ECW franchise as a WWE brand, complementary to Raw and SmackDown. On June 13, Heyman, the brand's former owner and newly appointed figurehead for the ECW brand, recommissioned the ECW World Heavyweight Championship to be the brand's world title and awarded it to Rob Van Dam as a result of winning the WWE Championship at ECW One Night Stand 2006. During the first few months of ECW on Sci Fi, the show operated under the creative direction of Paul Heyman and was supervised by Vince McMahon. The ECW brand initially retained many elements of the wild and ruckus original ECW promotion, but gradually over the following months these were scaled back at the behest of McMahon and the show was brought in line with other WWE productions. This caused considerable discontent with Heyman, who walked off the project and left WWE entirely in December 2006, beginning a six-year hiatus from professional wrestling.

WWE's ECW brand would continue to operate until February 16, 2010, when it became defunct and replaced with NXT. Today, there are a handful of WWE-produced events that followed the legacy of the original ECW – Extreme Rules and Heatwave.

=== Other reunions ===
==== Hardcore Homecoming ====
On the same weekend as the ECW One Night Stand 2005 event another reunion show was held at the ECW Arena. Booked and promoted by Shane Douglas, Cody Michaels and Jeremy Borash, Hardcore Homecoming was held on June 10, 2005. The show featured former ECW performers who were not contracted to work the WWE produced event. Because of the success of the initial event, three additional shows were held in Autumn 2005 and later the DVD documentary Forever Hardcore was released by the same production crew as a counterpart to WWE's Rise and Fall of ECW.

==== Hardcore Justice in TNA ====
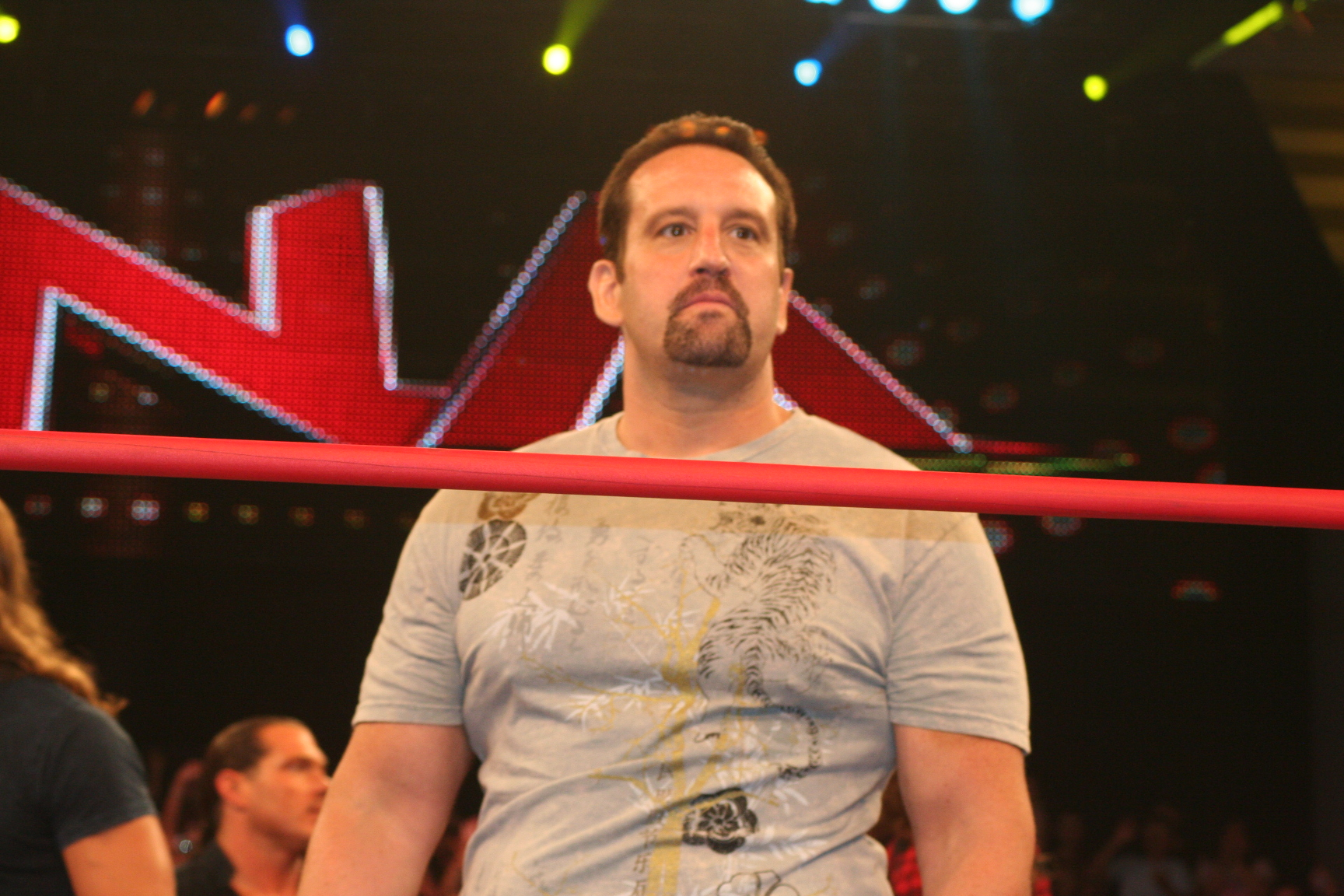
Tommy Dreamer in TNA after his debut in 2010. He subsequently founded the House of Hardcore promotion in 2012.

Following Tommy Dreamer's June 2010 debut in Total Nonstop Action Wrestling (TNA), a new stable was formed called EV2.0 consisting of former ECW alumni. TNA President Dixie Carter agreed to give the stable their own reunion show at TNA's annual Hard Justice pay-per-view. Billed as the last ECW reunion show, Hardcore Justice aired on August 8, 2010. EV2.0 remained on the active roster for the remainder of the year.

==== Extreme Rising ====
In 2012 Shane Douglas led a project called Extreme Reunion, later renamed Extreme Rising. The concept of the promotion was to produce shows in the style of ECW and feature new and upcoming talent, rather than strictly only feature ECW alumni. The promotion ran several shows in 2012 but folded soon thereafter.

==== House of Hardcore ====
In 2012, Dreamer founded House of Hardcore (HOH), a wrestling promotion named after the ECW wrestling school and inspired by the hardcore style of wrestling. Since then, HOH has held numerous wrestling events mainly in areas where ECW was held such as the ECW Arena.

== Controversies ==
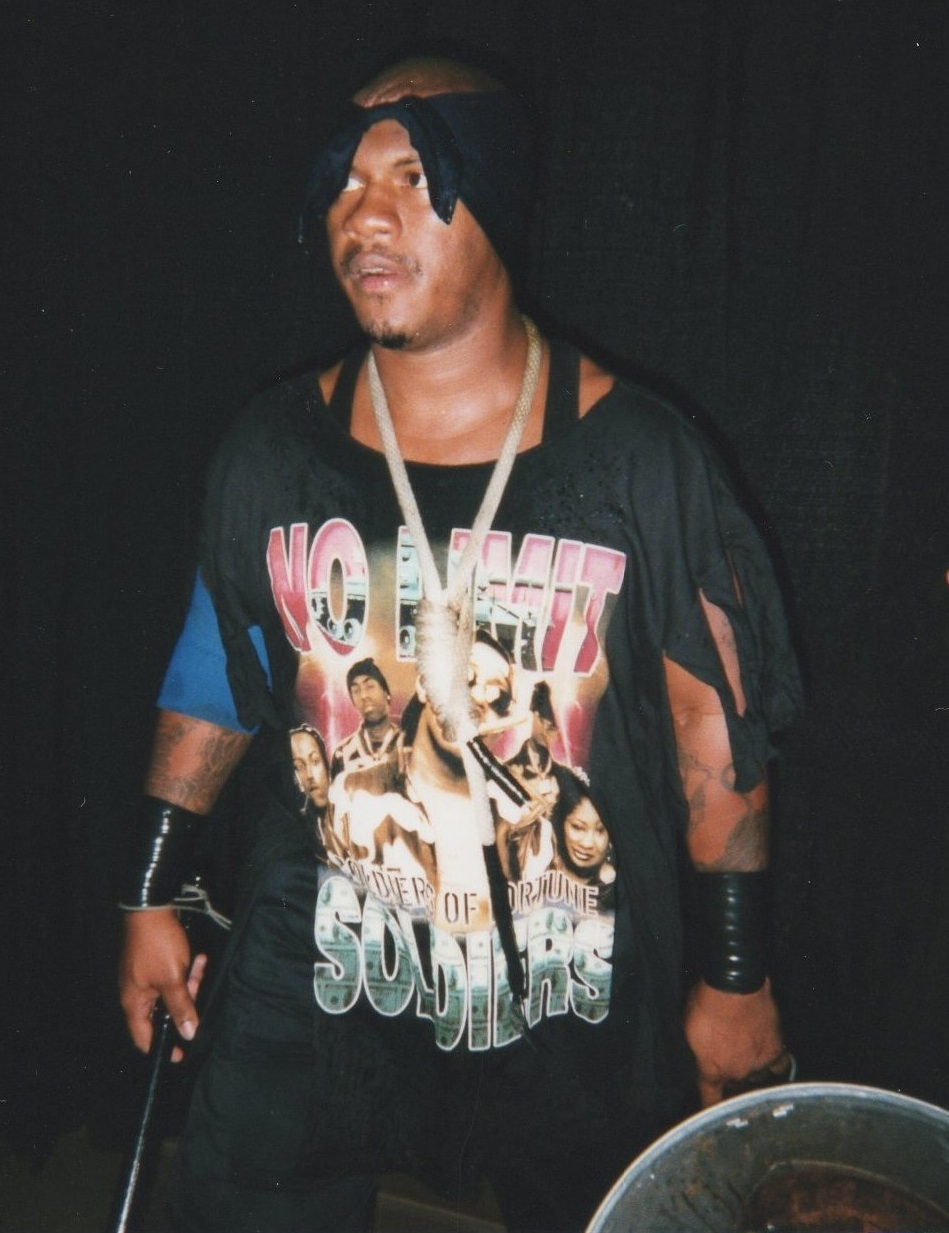
ECW roster member New Jack.

Throughout its existence, ECW cultivated an image of a rebellious organization that lived on the edge and "pushed the envelope". Not only did ECW engage in a wrestling style considered more dangerous than its larger competitors, but it also performed riskier and more controversial angles (storylines) as well. This culture within the company sometimes led to major controversies within the professional wrestling industry.

One such instance was the "Sandman crucifixion angle" at ECW High Incident. As part of a long-running storyline between Raven and The Sandman, Sandman was attacked by Raven's Nest, which included The Sandman's real-life wife Lori Fullington and their young son Tyler, who in the storyline had become devotees of Raven. As part of the attack, a wooden cross was brought from under the ring and the members of Raven's Nest proceeded to "crucify" Sandman with it, and enforced the use of religious iconography by placing a "crown" made out of barbed wire on his head in a direct allusion to the Crucifixion of Jesus. ECW's normally rowdy crowd was shocked into silence and the angle was immediately considered to have backfired. That same night, Raven was forced to make an out-of-character apology to the live audience. The footage of the "crucifixion" was never aired on ECW television. Olympian wrestler Kurt Angle, who was in attendance for the show and who had been considering wrestling for ECW in the future, immediately left the ECW Arena in disgust due to the incident.

Another instance of a high controversy that occurred in ECW was the Mass Transit incident. The Mass Transit incident took place during an ECW house show on November 23, 1996, at the Wonderland Ballroom in Revere, Massachusetts. 17-year-old Erich Kulas, an aspiring professional wrestler who used the ring name "Mass Transit," was seriously injured in a tag-team match against The Gangstas; the most severe injury occurred when Kulas was bladed too deeply by New Jack (Jerome Young), severing two of his arteries. Further controversy arose when it came to light that Kulas had lied to ECW owner and booker Paul Heyman about his age and professional wrestling training. The incident led to the temporary cancellation of the inaugural ECW pay-per-view Barely Legal, and legal action against New Jack. Due to Kulas's deception, however, Barely Legal was reinstated and the legal action ended in Young's favor.

In July 2000, ECW made its West Coast debut, holding its annual summer pay-per-view Heat Wave in Los Angeles, California. At the time Los Angeles was home to Xtreme Pro Wrestling (XPW), a recently established promotion owned by Extreme Associates owner Rob Zicari which imitated the style and presentation of ECW. Six members of the XPW roster (Note: The XPW roster members were The Messiah, Kid Kaos, Supreme, Kristi Myst, Homeless Jimmy and XPW announcer Kris Kloss.) purchased front-row tickets to the PPV and attended the show. Prior to the start of the main event, a legitimate out-of-character brawl broke out between the XPW contingent and members of the ECW roster, which spilled out into the parking lot of the venue. Although ECW and XPW as organizations were considered to have great dislike for each other, several ECW talent would perform for XPW following the folding of ECW in 2001.

== Legacy ==
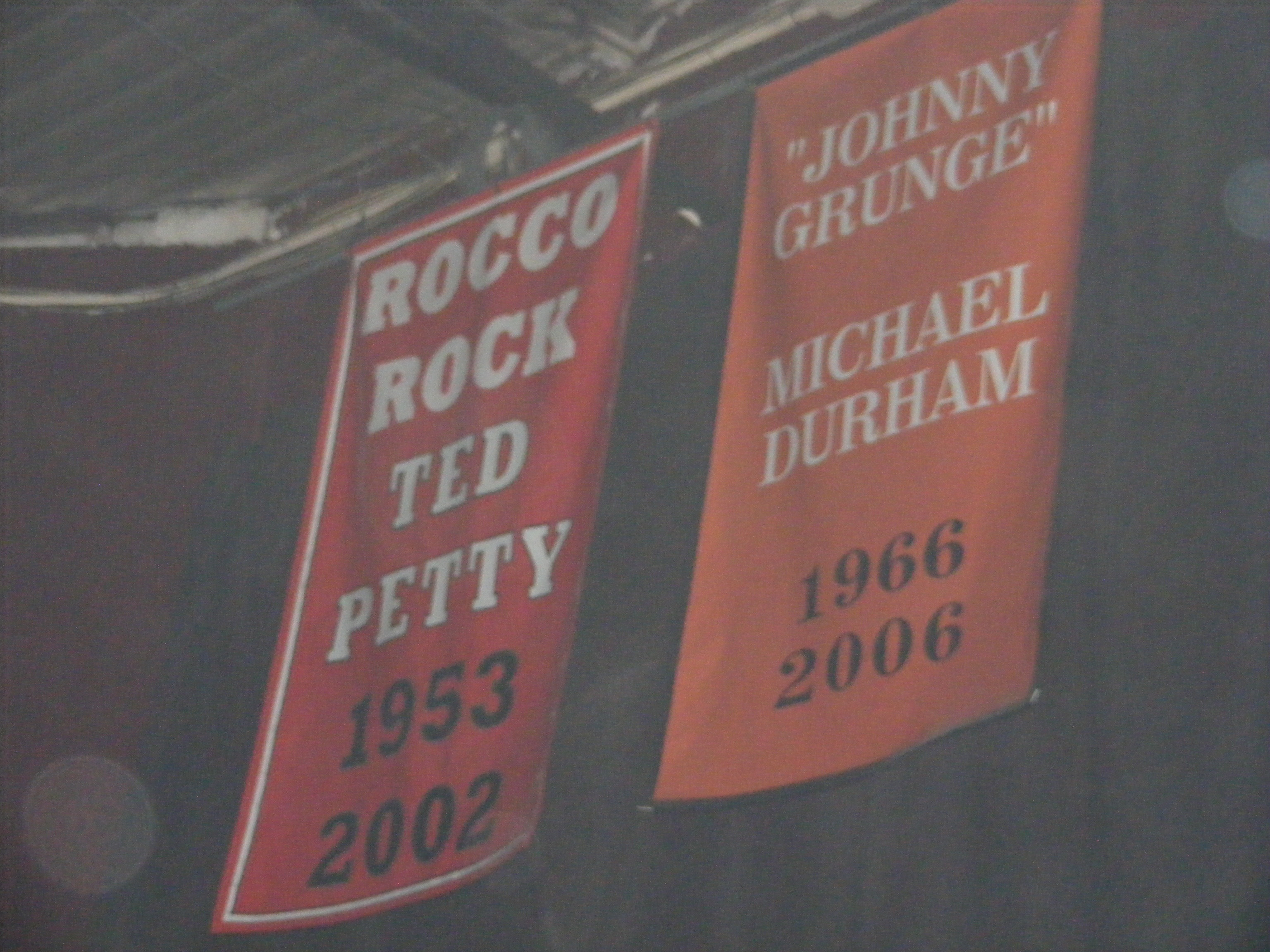
Hardcore Hall of Fame banners commemorating The Public Enemy hang at the 2300 Arena.

ECW was very influential within professional wrestling in the 1990s and several elements innovated and introduced by ECW would continue to be used in professional wrestling decades after its closure.

In the immediate aftermath of ECW collapse, a significant portion of ECW's active roster was brought into the WWF. These former ECW talents would be used as part of a storyline that ran in the WWF throughout 2001 that pitted the WWF against the "invading" WCW and ECW. The storyline began proper at the WWF Invasion pay-per-view, which received 775,000 buys and became one of the highest-grossing wrestling pay-per-views of all time. The storyline ran until November's Survivor Series, and thereafter former ECW talent were integrated into the WWF without being directly tied to the ECW branding. Former ECW talent such as Rob Van Dam would be prominent parts of WWF/WWE programming thereafter. Outside of the WWF, former ECW talent were integral in helping new promotions find their feet. Alumni such as Raven were important figures during the startup phase of NWA: Total Nonstop Action and Ring of Honor. Many promotions, such as Combat Zone Wrestling and Xtreme Pro Wrestling, attempted to directly imitate ECW and capture its audience once it folded, to the point that these companies directly competed for control of the ECW Arena. Throughout the 2000s, ECW's home base of Philadelphia was considered a highly potent source of fans for Independent wrestling promotions.

Following the release of commercially successful ECW retrospectives by WWE in the mid-2000s, WWE tapped into the legacy of ECW with reunion shows before attempting to fully revive ECW. This move was mirrored all across American professional wrestling, with several independent revivals springing up and several established promotions pivoting their content to incorporate hardcore wrestling and former ECW stars. After the relaunch of the ECW brand, it initially shifted focus from original ECW alumni toward experimenting with new and upcoming talent. This laid the groundwork for NXT, which would evolve into WWE’s primary developmental brand and gain critical acclaim for its experimental nature and emphasis on emerging talent. After the ECW brand was dissolved, its legacy remains through NXT’s focus on new talent and its appeal to a dedicated fanbase reminiscent of ECW’s innovative and rebellious spirit.

The former ECW Arena, now known as the 2300 Arena, is host to the Hardcore Hall of Fame, which recognizes its history with hardcore wrestling.

== Championships and programming ==
=== Championships ===
Championship	Notes
Extreme Championship Wrestling titles
ECW World Heavyweight Championship	The world title of ECW. It was established in 1992 while ECW was still a member of the National Wrestling Alliance, and continued to be defended within the promotion until 2001. The title was also defended within World Wrestling Entertainment from 2006 through 2010. The first champion was Jimmy Snuka and the final champion was Ezekiel Jackson.
ECW World Tag Team Championship	The world tag team title of ECW. It was established in 1992 under National Wrestling Alliance affiliate and ECW precursor, Eastern Championship Wrestling, and continued to be defended until 2001. The first champions were The Super Destroyers and the final champions were Danny Doring and Roadkill.
ECW World Television Championship	The title was established in 1992 under National Wrestling Alliance affiliate and ECW precursor, Eastern Championship Wrestling, and continued to be defended until 2001. The first champion was Johnny Hotbody and the final champion in the original ECW was Rhyno. The championship was briefly revived by Game Changer Wrestling in 2022.
FTW Heavyweight Championship	An unsanctioned world title, akin to the Million Dollar Championship, created for Taz. Was defended within ECW from 1998 through 1999. It was unified with the ECW World Heavyweight Championship by Taz. The title was revived by All Elite Wrestling in 2020, where it was utilized until 2024, most notably by Taz's son, Hook.
Eastern Championship Wrestling titles
ECW Pennsylvania Championship	The title was established March 14, 1993 under Eastern Championship Wrestling. It briefly featured on a number of ECW shows in Pennsylvania before it was deactivated circa early 1994.
ECW Maryland Championship	The title was established October 16, 1993 under Eastern Championship Wrestling, but was never defended following its creation and was deactivated circa early 1994.

=== Programming ===
Programming	Notes
ECW Hardcore TV	Aired from 1993–2000. A syndicated program, that was broadcast on the MSG Network.
ECW on TNN	Aired from 1999–2000. Broadcast exclusively on The Nashville Network.

== See also ==
- List of former Extreme Championship Wrestling personnel
- List of ECW supercards and pay-per-view events
