= Blading (professional wrestling) =

Intentionally cutting oneself to provoke bleeding in professional wrestling

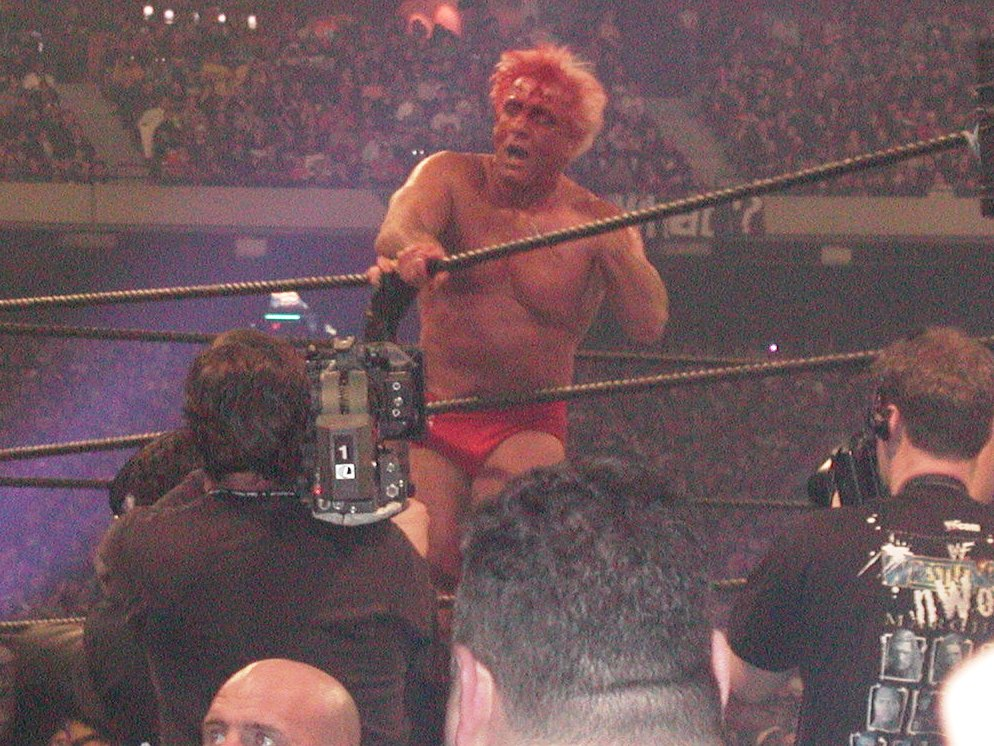
Ric Flair, a regular practitioner of blading, as demonstrated at WrestleMania X8

In professional wrestling, blading is the practice of intentionally cutting oneself to provoke bleeding. It is also known as "juicing", "gigging", or "getting color". Similarly, a blade is an object used for blading, and a bladejob is a specific act of blading. The act is usually done a good length into the match, as the blood will mix with the flowing sweat on a wrestler's brow to make it look like much more blood is flowing from the wound than there actually is. The preferred area for blading is usually the forehead, as scalp wounds bleed profusely and heal easily. Legitimate, unplanned bleeding which occurs outside the storyline is called "juicing the hard way".

== History ==
=== Origin ===
Prior to the advent of blading, most storyline blood in wrestling came from one wrestler deliberately splitting the flesh over their opponent's eyebrow bone with a hard, well placed and forceful punch. In his third autobiography, The Hardcore Diaries, Mick Foley cited Terry Funk as one of the few remaining active wrestlers who knew how to "bust an eyebrow open" in this way before Funk’s passing in August of 2023. However, on a very rare occasion, in the 2012 Extreme Rules event, Brock Lesnar caused John Cena to bleed without blading with a vicious elbow to his head and further hard strikes to Cena's body, though Cena ultimately won the match, and the match was critically acclaimed. The forehead has always been the preferred blading surface, due to the abundance of blood vessels. A cut in this area will bleed freely for a length of time and will heal quickly. A cut in this location will allow the blood to mix in with the sweat on the wrestler's face, giving them a "crimson mask" effect.

=== Contemporary history ===
In the 1980s, the willingness to blade was seen as an advantage for new wrestlers. In past North American professional wrestling, blading was almost exclusively performed by and on male performers. However in promotions that allow blading in the 2020s such as All Elite Wrestling (AEW), women have bladed as well. For example, in a match between Britt Baker and Thunder Rosa in 2021, Baker underwent excessive bleeding because of blading during the match.

However, popularity of blading declined during the mid-2000's. One reason for this decline was due to heightened awareness of AIDS and hepatitis, which can spread from contact with blood. From July 2008 onward, due to its TV-PG rating, WWE did not allow wrestlers to blade themselves. In most cases, any blood coming from the wrestlers was unintentional. To maintain their TV-PG rating, when a wrestler bleeds on live television, WWE tends to attempt to stop the bleeding mid-match or use different camera angles to avoid showing excessive blood. During repeats of said footage, WWE television programs often shift to black-and-white to obscure any visible bleeding.

Total Nonstop Action Wrestling (TNA), formerly known as Impact Wrestling (2017-2024), used blading frequently until adopting a new no-blood policy in 2014. Wrestlers Abyss and Raven were famed for their matches involving a lot of blood in TNA before the new policy in 2014.

In the past several years, however, All Elite Wrestling has used blading semi-frequently by way of specific wrestlers like Jon Moxley and Adam Page. AEW also has been known for promoting hardcore and death matches involving barbed wire, thumbtacks, and broken glass, giving more of an incentive for the wrestlers to blade to give the appearance of being wounded by the various weapons. One infamous instance involved Nick Gage cutting Chris Jericho's forehead with a pizza cutter during a picture-in-picture advertisement that coincidentally was promoting Domino's Pizza at the same time.

The wrestler always runs the risk of cutting too deeply and slicing an artery in the forehead. In 2004, Eddie Guerrero accidentally did this during his match with JBL at Judgment Day, resulting in a rush of blood pouring from the bladed area. Guerrero lost so much blood because of the cut that he felt the effects from it for two weeks.

Some wrestlers have prominent or disfiguring scars due to blading, including the following: Dusty Rhodes, New Jack, Bruiser Brody, King Curtis Iaukea, Carlos Colón Sr., Perro Aguayo, Devon Hughes (Brother Devon/D-Von Dudley), Steve Corino, Tarzan Goto, Balls Mahoney, Kintaro Kanemura, Jun Kasai, Keiji Muto, Masashi Takeda, Corporal Robinson, Villano III, Ian Rotten, Sabu, The Sheik, and Manny Fernandez. According to Mick Foley, the scars in Abdullah the Butcher's forehead are so deep that he enjoys holding coins or gambling chips in them as a macabre party trick.

== Examples ==
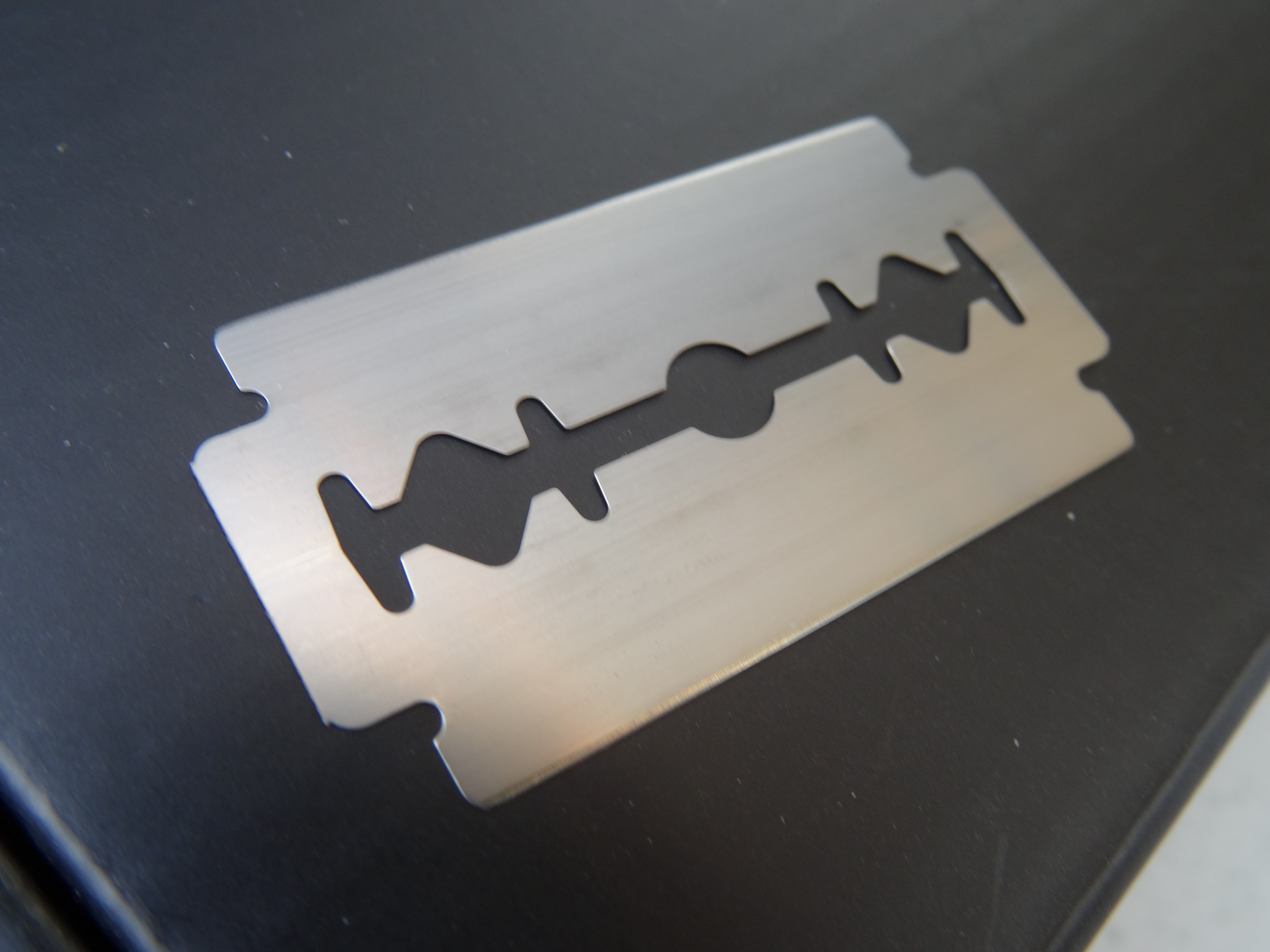
Using a razor blade is how a wrestler "gets color".

One of the most famous such incidents was a bladejob performed by Japanese wrestler The Great Muta in a 1992 match with Hiroshi Hase; the amount of blood Muta lost was so great that many people to this day judge the severity of bladejobs on the Muta Scale.

Extreme Championship Wrestling (ECW) was famous for their hardcore style wrestling employing excessive usage of blading. By far the most controversial incident relating to blading was the Mass Transit incident at an ECW house show on November 23, 1996. During a scheduled tag team match between the team of Axl Rotten and D-Von Dudley versus the team of New Jack and Mustafa Saed, Axl Rotten could not make the show and was replaced by 17-year-old fan Erich Kulas, who lied about both his age (claiming to be 21) and wrestling experience. Before the match, Kulas asked New Jack, who was notorious for his stiff hardcore wrestling style and for shooting on opponents, to blade him, since he never had done it himself, and New Jack agreed. New Jack bladed Kulas with a surgical scalpel but cut too deeply and severed two arteries in Kulas' forehead. Kulas screamed in pain, then passed out as blood poured from his head, and was later hospitalized. The incident generated much negative publicity and a lawsuit by Kulas's family, where New Jack was charged but the Jury dropped all charges as the blading was done per Kulas's request and Kulas had lied about his age. Erich Kulas later died on May 12, 2002, but no connection was made between his death and the incident.

During an interview on Jimmy Kimmel Live!, Mickey Rourke spoke about his experience with gigging himself for a scene in the 2008 movie The Wrestler. Rourke agreed to gig at the initial request of director Darren Aronofsky in hopes that he would revoke the demand come production time. Indeed, later during filming, Aronofsky admitted that Rourke needn't actually gig; however, by his own will, Rourke decided to go through with it anyway. In the film itself, Rourke's character is seen preparing for a match by wrapping a razor blade inside his wrist tape.

There is one notable incident of blading in association football. In 1989, Chile national team goalkeeper Roberto Rojas bladed himself to prevent a loss, by blaming the injury on fireworks thrown by opposing fans. FIFA saw through the ruse and ended up banning Rojas for life and banning Chile from the 1994 FIFA World Cup. Rojas's ban was lifted in 2001.

Canadian wrestler Devon Nicholson pressed charges against Abdullah the Butcher, claiming that he contracted hepatitis C after Abdullah bladed him without consent. An Ontario court ruled in favor of Nicholson and ordered Abdullah to pay $2.3 million.

During their King of the Road match at Uncensored 1995, Dustin Rhodes and The Blacktop Bully bladed, which was against the policy of World Championship Wrestling (WCW) at the time, and they were both fired as a result.

== Sources ==
- Mick Foley (2000). Have A Nice Day: A Tale of Blood and Sweatsocks. HarperCollins. p. 511. ISBN 0-06-103101-1.
- Harley Race; Ricky Steamboat; Les Thatcher (2005). The Professional Wrestlers' Workout & Instructional Guide. Sports Publishing LLC. ISBN 1-58261-947-6.
- Jerry Lawler & Doug Asheville (2003). It's Good to Be the King... Sometimes. Simon and Schuster. ISBN 0-7434-7557-7.
- Matt and Jeff Hardy (2003). The Hardy Boyz: Exist 2 Inspire. HarperCollins. ISBN 0-06-052154-6.
- Scott E. Williams (2006). Hardcore History: The Extremely Unauthorized Story of ECW. Sports Publishing LLC. ISBN 1-59670-021-1.
- Stone Cold Steve Austin & Jim Ross (2003). The Stone Cold Truth. Pocket Books. ISBN 0-7434-7720-0.
