= Mass Transit incident (professional wrestling) =

Professional wrestling controversy

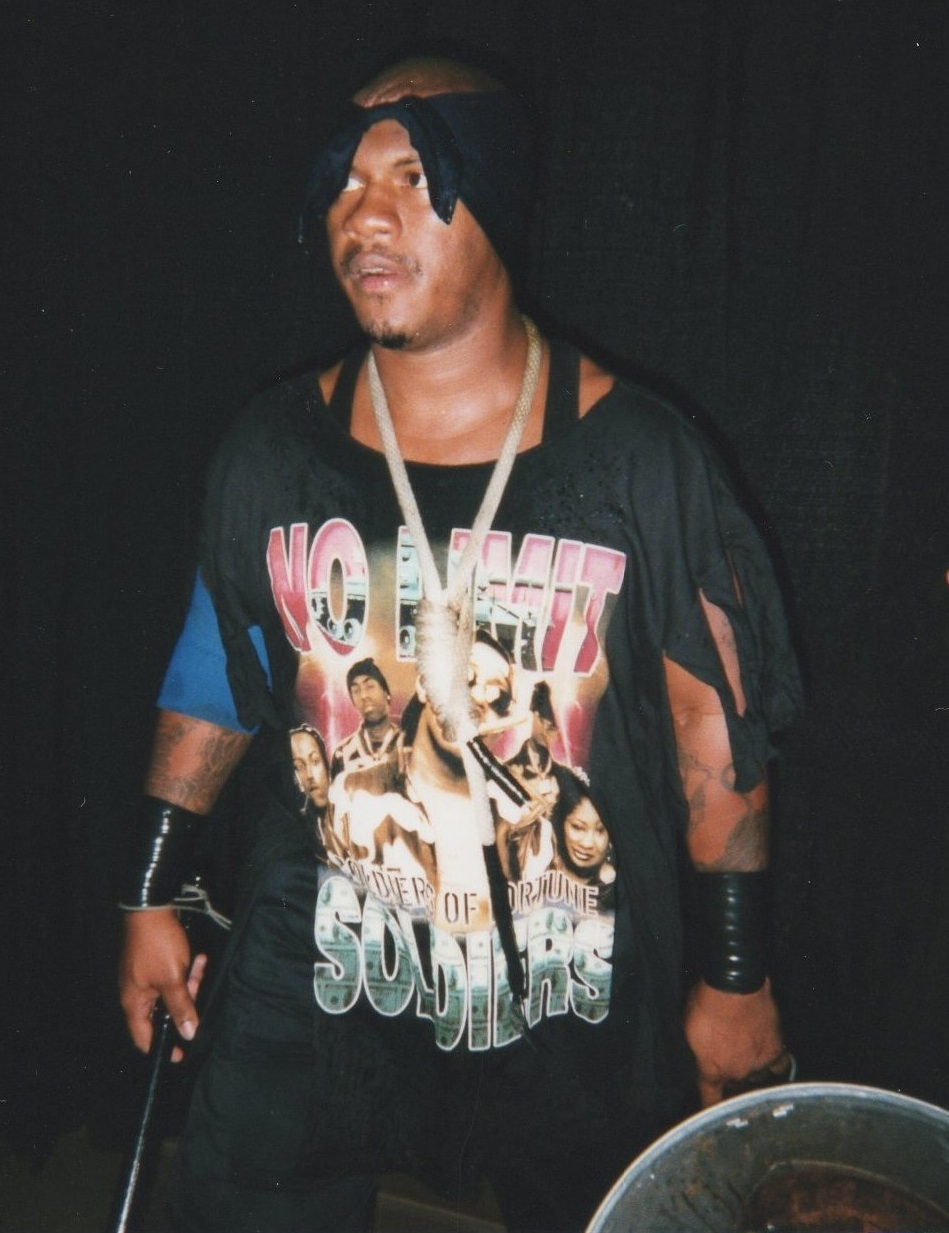
New Jack, photographed here in 1998

The Mass Transit incident was a professional wrestling controversy that took place during an Extreme Championship Wrestling (ECW) house show on November 23, 1996, at the Wonderland Greyhound Park in Revere, Massachusetts, United States. 17-year-old Erich Kulas, an aspiring professional wrestler who used the ring name "Mass Transit", was seriously injured in a tag team match against The Gangstas; the most severe injury occurred when Kulas was bladed too deeply by New Jack (Jerome Young), severing two of his arteries. Further controversy arose when it came to light that Kulas had lied to ECW owner and booker Paul Heyman about his age and professional wrestling training.

The incident led to the temporary cancellation of the inaugural ECW pay-per-view Barely Legal and legal action against Young. Due to Kulas's deception, however, Barely Legal was reinstated and the legal action ended in Young's favor.

== Match ==
Axl Rotten had been scheduled to work a tag team match with D-Von Dudley against The Gangstas (New Jack and Mustafa Saed), but could not make the show due to a family emergency; Dudley later stated that it was the death of Rotten's grandmother. The show was also scheduled to feature dwarf wrestlers Tiny the Terrible and Half Nelson against 17-year-old Erich Kulas, who performed as Mass Transit, a Ralph Kramden-esque bus driver. Kulas convinced Extreme Championship Wrestling (ECW) owner and booker Paul Heyman to have him fill in for Rotten by claiming he was 21 and had wrestled for Killer Kowalski, a retired star wrestler who ran a notable wrestling school in the Boston area. Heyman said later he did not know Kulas's age.

New Jack later claimed that he had attempted to dissuade Kulas from going through with the match. Instead, Kulas asked New Jack to blade him since he never had done it himself, to which New Jack agreed. During the match, Dudley and New Jack brawled outside the ring, while Saed and Transit fought inside the ring. The match was booked as a squash, with Dudley quickly isolated outside the ring and told not to return by the Gangstas. The Gangstas then double-teamed Kulas inside the ring, with New Jack pummeling him with crutches, toasters and various other objects in the hardcore style for which ECW was known, which Dudley stated were legitimate items and not gimmicked specifically for the match. At the end of the match, New Jack bladed Kulas with a surgical scalpel, as the two had agreed, but cut too deeply and severed two arteries in Kulas's forehead. He screamed in pain, then lost consciousness as blood poured from his head.

The event was a house show and thus not televised, but RF Video was on hand with a fan camcorder, recording the match for their ECW "Fan Cam" series, and that footage was eventually used as evidence in legal proceedings. The video showed New Jack quietly asking Kulas, after the blading, "You all right?" to which Kulas replies, "Yeah, I'm fine." Next, The Gangstas proceeded to work Kulas over even more with elbow drops and various objects, prompting Kulas' father Stephen to scream, "Ring the fucking bell! He's 17!" As medics rushed into the ring to aid Kulas, New Jack grabbed the house microphone and, in an attempt to garner heat, shouted, "I don't care if the motherfucker dies! He's white! I don't like white people! I don't like people from Boston! I'm the wrong nigga to fuck with!"

== Repercussions ==
=== Pay-per-view cancellation ===
The incident led to the cancellation of ECW's first ever pay-per-view (PPV) event, Barely Legal, by pay-per-view provider Request TV on Christmas Eve 1996. Heyman, by his own admission in The Rise and Fall of ECW, "begged and pleaded" with Request and finally convinced the company that ECW had been misled about Kulas's age. The PPV event was placed back on the schedule on Sunday, April 13, 1997, at 9:00 pm.

=== Inside Edition interview ===
Kulas and his family later gave an interview to the syndicated tabloid program Inside Edition, which featured footage from the incident. The segment depicted Kulas as an innocent, unprepared victim while vilifying ECW, even going as far as showing that Heyman had not asked for any state identification. The story was completed before the Kulases launched their lawsuit, so the key details of how Kulas actually got himself into the match had not been made public at that point.

=== Legal action ===
Three years after the incident, New Jack was tried on charges of assault and battery with a dangerous weapon, and was later sued by the Kulas family. After hearing Kulas asked to be cut, a jury acquitted New Jack, and he was later found not liable in civil court.

Wrestlers testified that Kulas was extremely arrogant and demanding backstage prior to the match and, when told that he would have to bleed as part of the match, Kulas had asked New Jack to blade him, since he had never done it. Dudley stated that he knew things would go wrong when Kulas introduced himself to New Jack and "wanted to suggest some ideas", both a violation of unwritten rules of younger wrestlers not taking the lead from veterans as well as "New Jack being New Jack". The book The Rise and Fall of ECW also states that as the medic crew carried Kulas out, he was escorted by Tommy Dreamer, who held his hand to comfort him. Passing by the audience, Kulas began giving them the finger in an attempt to continue "playing the bad guy".

Authorities later determined that Kulas had lied to Heyman about his age and experience; Kulas claimed to be 21 years of age, but he was actually 17 years old. He also claimed to have been trained by Killer Kowalski, and his father vouched for him, but Kulas was never trained to wrestle. In The Rise and Fall of ECW, Heyman says Kulas's dubious credentials as a student of Kowalski were endorsed by Tiny the Terrible. Years later in a view of hindsight, Tiny the Terrible recounted feeling resentment over Kulas abandoning him and his brother to take a higher profile match.

Dudley said that the culture was different in 1996 in that anything someone said about their credentials was taken as fact as opposed to the modern day where promoters do their due dillegence and check someone's credentials before booking them, which was enacted in part due to the Mass Transit incident. For New Jack's part, after the match he was reportedly annoyed that ECW had let a legal minor wrestle a match and had already left the arena before police arrived.

== Later events ==
Erich Kulas died on May 12, 2002, at the age of 22, due to complications from gastric bypass surgery.

The incident was featured in a 2020 episode of Dark Side of the Ring centered on New Jack. Kulas's family declined to participate in the episode.

Up to his own death in May 2021, New Jack did not express remorse for the incident: the final tweet on his Twitter account, posted just a day before his death from a heart attack, reiterated that Kulas requested the blading.

One positive that came out of the incident was that it made promoters, particularly on the independent circuit do more vetting on making sure wrestlers are of legal age. In an interview with Maven Huffman about the incident in 2024, D-Von Dudley said that he wouldn't let his own sons (who are also professional wrestlers) enter the business until they were 18 and that due to the ramifications of the incident Heyman would never even consider booking Kulas for another match even once he turned 18.

== See also ==
- Chuck Austin
- Syko Stu
