= The Rise and Fall of ECW =

2005 film by Kevin Dunn

- DVD cover
- Directed by: Kevin Dunn
- Written by: Paul Heyman
- Produced by: Paul Heyman
- Production company: WWE
- Distributed by: WWE Home Video
- Release date: October 16, 2004 (U.S.)
- Running time: 365 minutes
- Language: English

The Rise and Fall of ECW was a 2004 direct-to-video documentary produced by World Wrestling Entertainment (WWE). It chronicles the history of Philadelphia-based professional wrestling promotion Extreme Championship Wrestling. The documentary features interviews with various performers who worked in the promotion including co-founder and former owner Paul Heyman as well as performers Tazz, Tommy Dreamer, Dawn Marie, Stevie Richards, Mick Foley, Chris Jericho, Lance Storm, Rey Mysterio, Eddie Guerrero, Chris Benoit, Rob Van Dam, Rhyno, Nunzio, Spike Dudley, Bubba Ray Dudley and D'Von Dudley. The documentary also featured interviews with ECW rival company executives, WWE Chairman Vince McMahon and former WCW Senior Vice President Eric Bischoff. The Rise and Fall of ECW was released by WWE Home Video on October 16, 2004. A book with the same title was published by WWE and Pocket Books in 2006, with much of the same information and interviews from the DVD transcribed and included. A 2.5 hour version of The Rise and Fall of ECW was available on demand, on the former WWE Network.

== Reception ==
The documentary proved to be one of the most popular pieces of media ever produced by WWE, with DVDs of the documentary selling in the hundreds of thousands.

Wrestling Observer Newsletter awarded the DVD the "Best Pro Wrestling DVD" of 2005.

In June 2005, an unauthorized DVD called Forever Hardcore was written, directed and produced by Jeremy Borash in response to The Rise and Fall of ECW. The DVD featured interviews with ECW alumni who were not employed by WWE telling their side of ECW's history.

The success of Rise and Fall of ECW and Forever Hardcore led to WWE reassessing the value of the ECW brand and directly resulted in WWE hosting ECW One Night Stand (2005) to further test how much strength remained in the ECW fandom.

== See also ==
- Forever Hardcore
