= Monty Brown =

American football player and professional wrestler (born 1970)

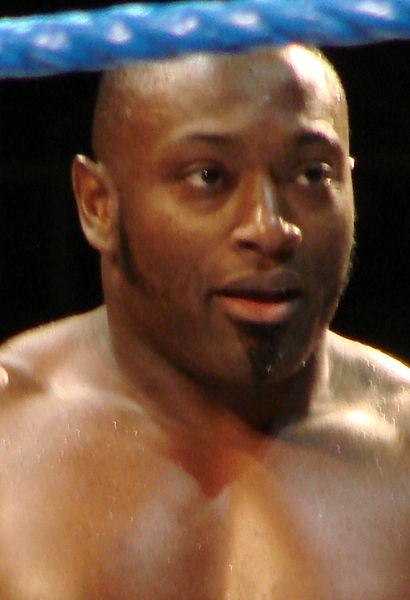
- Brown in 2007
- Born: Montaque Brown; April 13, 1970 (age 56); Saginaw, Michigan, U.S.
- Education: Ferris State University
- Professional wrestling career
- Ring name(s): Marcus Cor Von; Marquis Cor Von; Monty Brown
- Billed height: 6 ft 2 in (188 cm)
- Billed weight: 265 lb (120 kg)
- Billed from: Detroit, Michigan; The Animal Kingdom; The Serengeti
- Trained by: Dan Severn; Sabu
- Debut: 2000
- Retired: September 19, 2007
- Football career

No. 96, 93
- Position: Linebacker

Personal information
- Listed height: 6 ft 1 in (1.85 m)
- Listed weight: 240 lb (109 kg)

Career information
- High school: Bridgeport (MI)
- College: Ferris State

Career history
- Buffalo Bills (1993–1995); New England Patriots (1996)

Career statistics
- Solo tackles: 71
- Assists: 35
- Total tackles: 106
- Stats at Pro Football Reference

Montaque "Monty" Brown (born April 13, 1970) is an American retired professional wrestler and NFL linebacker. In professional wrestling, he is best known for his time with Total Nonstop Action Wrestling (TNA) where he wrestled under his real name, and with World Wrestling Entertainment (WWE), where he wrestled on its ECW brand under the ring name Marquis Cor Von, later changed to Marcus Cor Von. In both companies, he utilized the nickname "the Alpha Male". As a football player, he competed at Super Bowl XXVIII for the Buffalo Bills.

== American football career ==
=== College ===
Brown attended Ferris State University in Big Rapids, Michigan, where he was an All-American linebacker with the Ferris State Bulldogs, breaking and setting several defensive records. Brown was the first Ferris State Bulldogs athlete to be named both a first-team Academic All-American and a first-team All-American. In 1992, Brown ranked fifth as a national finalist for the Harlon Hill Trophy (awarded to the NCAA Division II Player of the Year) and was named conference co-player of the year in 1992. As a senior, Brown was named the Most Valuable Player of the Ferris State Bulldogs. In his final year, Brown was named the C.M. Frank National Defensive Player of the Year. He was inducted into the Bulldog Athletics Hall of Fame in 2009.

=== Buffalo Bills ===
After Brown graduated, he signed as an undrafted free agent with the Buffalo Bills on May 6, 1993, after going undrafted in the 1993 NFL draft. He played in 13 games his rookie year and recorded 3 total tackles. He also played in 2 playoff games as the Bills advanced to Super Bowl XXVIII, where they lost to the Dallas Cowboys.

He only played in 3 games in 1994 before being placed on injured reserve on November 30, 1994.

Brown played in all 16 games, starting 6, in 1995 and recorded 69 total tackles. He also played in 2 playoff games, starting both, and recorded 10 total tackles. He became a free agent after the season.

=== New England Patriots ===
On April 17, 1996, Brown signed with the New England Patriots as a restricted free agent, and Brown immediately became a starter as the right outside linebacker. Brown stated that one of his reasons for signing with the Patriots was to be closer to the World Wrestling Federation headquarters in Stamford, Connecticut. Overall, he played in 11 games, starting 7, for the Patriots in 1996 and recorded 34 total tackles before being placed on injured reserve on December 3, 1996. He was released by the Patriots on August 19, 1997.

His football career ended due to an ankle injury, and he decided to train as a professional wrestler.

== Professional wrestling career ==
=== Early career (2000-2002) ===
Brown was trained to be a professional wrestler by Dan "the Beast" Severn and Sabu, and made his in-ring debut in 2000. He began his career in Michigan's All World Wrestling League, where he wrestled against competitors including his trainer Sabu. During this time, he teamed with Chris Sabin.

=== Total Nonstop Action Wrestling (2002) ===
==== Early appearances (2002) ====
In 2002, Brown made several appearances with Total Nonstop Action Wrestling, including challenging NWA World Heavyweight Champion Ron Killings, but did not become a permanent part of the company, as his face persona did not connect with fans. His last appearance with the company in 2002 was on August 28. For a time in mid-2003, he worked for the All World Wrestling League/Big Time Wrestling and was defeated by Sabu in Lansing, MI in a bout for Sabu's World Wrestling Council Heavyweight Championship.

=== Independent Circuit (2002-2004) ===
Brown returned to the independents in Michigan and Border City Wrestling in Southern Ontario.

In 2004, he made a couple of appearances for Juggalo Championship Wrestling.

=== Return to TNA (2004-2006) ===
==== Planet Jarrett (2004–2005) ====
He returned to the company on March 10, 2004, attacking the Insane Clown Posse during a match in progress. He now had an in-ring persona of being from the Serengeti, which involved him wearing leopard and tiger-print trunks, and possessing the mannerisms of an African predatory animal. At TNA Final Resolution pay-per-view, Brown defeated Kevin Nash and Diamond Dallas Page in a three-way elimination match to receive a match for the NWA World Heavyweight Championship. Despite being very popular, Brown was booked to lose the match against Jarrett. According to Jarrett, he didn't drop the title to Brown due to the lack of heel competitors.

Two months later, Brown turned heel during the main event of March's Destination X event by attacking Page to help Jarrett retain the championship. Brown soon joined the Planet Jarrett stable and spent several months feuding with Jarrett's enemies: Kevin Nash, Sean Waltman, Diamond Dallas Page, and AJ Styles. Late in the year, he began teaming with fellow Planet Jarrett member Kip James, helping him battle the 3Live Kru in an attempt to convince Kru member B.G. James to reform his former tag team, the New Age Outlaws, with Kip. Brown and James faced Kru members Ron Killings and Konnan at Sacrifice in August in a match with B.G. as special guest referee, with both Kip and the remainder of the Kru urging him to take their respective side. B.G. eventually took the side of Konnan and Killings, costing Brown and James the match. Following the defeat, Brown insisted that he be the one to lead the team. On August 26 he turned his back on Jarrett, claiming that their agreement was broken.

==== NWA World Heavyweight Championship pursuit (2005–2006) ====
At Unbreakable on September 11, Brown declared his intention to challenge for the NWA World Heavyweight Championship at Bound For Glory. After defeating Lance Hoyt at Bound For Glory, Brown took part in a ten-man Gauntlet for the Gold match for number one contendership to the Championship, but eliminated himself from the match, by taking Jeff Hardy and himself over the top rope simultaneously. Brown did win number one contendership at November's Genesis with a singles victory over Jeff Hardy. After an altercation with the newly debuted Christian Cage, Brown agreed to put his championship shot on the line in a match against Cage at Turning Point in December. He lost the match to Cage, however, losing his championship opportunity in the process.

On the December 17 episode of Impact!, Brown renewed his alliance with Jarrett, with both men bitter towards TNA management in storyline. On the January 7, 2006, episode of Impact!, Jarrett and Brown enacted a skit mocking Sting, who had recently signed with TNA and was set to team with Christian Cage against Brown and Jarrett at Final Resolution. The Alpha Male posed as the Sting of 2006, complete with make-up and baby stroller. Sting and Cage defeated Brown and Jarrett at Final Resolution when Sting pinned Jarrett after a Scorpion Death Drop. After Christian Cage won the World Heavyweight Title, Brown received a shot at Destination X, but did not win the title. Following Destination X, Brown underwent surgery on his knee, which had previously "blown out". He returned to in-ring competition on April 29, 2006, in a match in Germany and TNA television on the May 18 episode of Impact! — where he (kayfabe) demanded to be included in the King of the Mountain match for the NWA World Heavyweight Championship at Slammiversary in June. After he failed to qualify for the King of the Mountain match, he engaged in a short feud with Rhino and Samoa Joe before his TNA contract expired and left the company.

=== World Wrestling Entertainment (2006–2007) ===
On November 16, 2006, World Wrestling Entertainment announced that Brown had signed a contract with the company through their official website. He debuted for their ECW brand as "the Alpha Male" Marquis Cor Von on January 16, 2007, in a win over fellow TNA alumnus Cassidy Riley. Reportedly the name change was motivated by World Wrestling Entertainment's desire to have him appear under a name they could trademark. One week later, the spelling of the first name was tweaked to Marcus.

On the January 23 edition of ECW, Cor Von defeated Wes Adams. Not long after his debut, he was made a part of the forming New Breed stable. On the February 6 episode of ECW on Sci Fi, Cor Von defeated Balls Mahoney. He and Kevin Thorn defeated Tommy Dreamer and The Sandman a week later. On the February 27 episode of ECW, Cor Von, Elijah Burke and Kevin Thorn defeated Rob Van Dam, Tommy Dreamer and Sandman. On the March 13 episode of ECW, Cor Von was in an Extreme Battle Royal involving both the ECW Originals and the New Breed, but failed to win the match. On the March 20 episode of ECW, Cor Von and Kevin Thorn defeated ECW Originals Rob Van Dam and Sabu, with their feud with the ECW Originals climaxing in an 8-man tag at WrestleMania 23 on April 1; where The New Breed lost.

The next night on Raw, Cor Von and Kevin Thorn participated in a 10-Team Battle Royal for the world tag team titles which was won by The Hardy Boyz. On the April 3 episode of ECW on Sci Fi, The New Breed defeated The ECW Originals in an 8-Man "Extreme Rules" match. On the April 10 episode of ECW, Cor Von defeated Rob Van Dam. On the April 24 episode of ECW, The New Breed faced The ECW Originals in an Elimination match but lost. At One Night Stand, The New Breed (Cor Von, Elijah Burke, and Matt Striker) lost to CM Punk and The ECW Originals (Tommy Dreamer and The Sandman) in a Six-man Tag Team Tables Match.

Cor Von wrestled his last match on the June 19 episode of ECW in a semi-final tournament loss for the vacant ECW World Championship against CM Punk where the winner would compete at Vengeance: Night of Champions against Chris Benoit on June 24. In late June 2007, Cor Von took several months off for unspecified "family issues". After three months of inactivity, WWE announced on September 19, 2007, that Cor Von was released from his WWE contract without making his return to television. Cor Von subsequently retired from professional wrestling officially after being released.

== Personal life ==
Brown attended Bridgeport High School, where he played basketball for three years under coach Jimmy Sanders, with whom he is good friends. During his early professional wrestling career, Brown supplemented his income by running his own t-shirt company. After leaving WWE and retiring from professional wrestling, Brown began working on a range of athletic clothing called "Scripture Clothing". As of 2011, Brown works as a personal trainer in his home state of Michigan.

== In other media ==
Brown, as Marcus Cor Von, appears as a playable character in the video game WWE SmackDown vs. Raw 2008, which was released in November 2007; two months after his release.

== Championships and accomplishments ==
- Prime Time Wrestling
  - PTW Heavyweight Championship (1 time)
  - Elite 8 Tournament (2005)
- Pro Wrestling Illustrated
  - PWI Rookie of the Year (2004)
  - Ranked No. 28 of the top 500 singles wrestlers in the PWI 500 in 2005

== See also ==
- List of gridiron football players who became professional wrestlers
