= Vengeance: Night of Champions =

2007 World Wrestling Entertainment pay-per-view event

- Promotional poster featuring Bobby Lashley, Edge, and John Cena holding the respective world championships of the ECW, SmackDown!, and Raw brands.
- Promotion: World Wrestling Entertainment
- Brand(s): Raw; SmackDown! ECW
- Date: June 24, 2007
- City: Houston, Texas
- Venue: Toyota Center
- Attendance: 15,000
- Buy rate: 243,000
- Tagline: "Night of Champions"

Pay-per-view chronology
← Previous; One Night Stand	Next → The Great American Bash

Vengeance chronology
← Previous; 2006	Next → 2011

Night of Champions chronology
← Previous; 2001	Next → 2008

Vengeance: Night of Champions was a 2007 professional wrestling pay-per-view (PPV) event produced by World Wrestling Entertainment (WWE). It was simultaneously the seventh annual Vengeance and the inaugural Night of Champions. The event took place on June 24, 2007, at the Toyota Center in Houston, Texas and was held for wrestlers from the promotion's Raw, SmackDown!, and ECW brand divisions. The theme of the event was that all nine of WWE's active championships at the time were defended.

The "Night of Champions" name was originally used by the former World Championship Wrestling (WCW) for the final broadcast of WCW Monday Nitro in March 2001; WCW was acquired by WWE, at the time known as the World Wrestling Federation (WWF, renamed in 2002), that same month. WWE then adopted "Night of Champions" as the theme for the 2007 Vengeance. This was the first Vengeance since 2002 to feature multiple brands after WWE discontinued brand-exclusive PPVs following WrestleMania 23 in April, also making it the first Vengeance to feature ECW, which was introduced as a third brand in May 2006. This would also be the final Vengeance until 2011, as Night of Champions continued in its place.

The main event featured the Raw brand. It saw John Cena defend the WWE Championship in a fatal five-way match against Mick Foley, Bobby Lashley, Randy Orton, and King Booker. Cena won the match and retained the title after pinning Foley. The featured match from the SmackDown! brand was a Last Chance match for the World Heavyweight Championship between Edge and Batista, in which Edge emerged victorious via countout.

Chris Benoit was originally booked to face and defeat CM Punk to win the vacant ECW World Championship; however, he did not show up and was replaced by Johnny Nitro, who won by pinfall after performing a corkscrew neckbreaker from the middle rope. Following the event, it was discovered that Benoit had murdered his wife and son, and then committed suicide.

== Production ==
=== Background ===
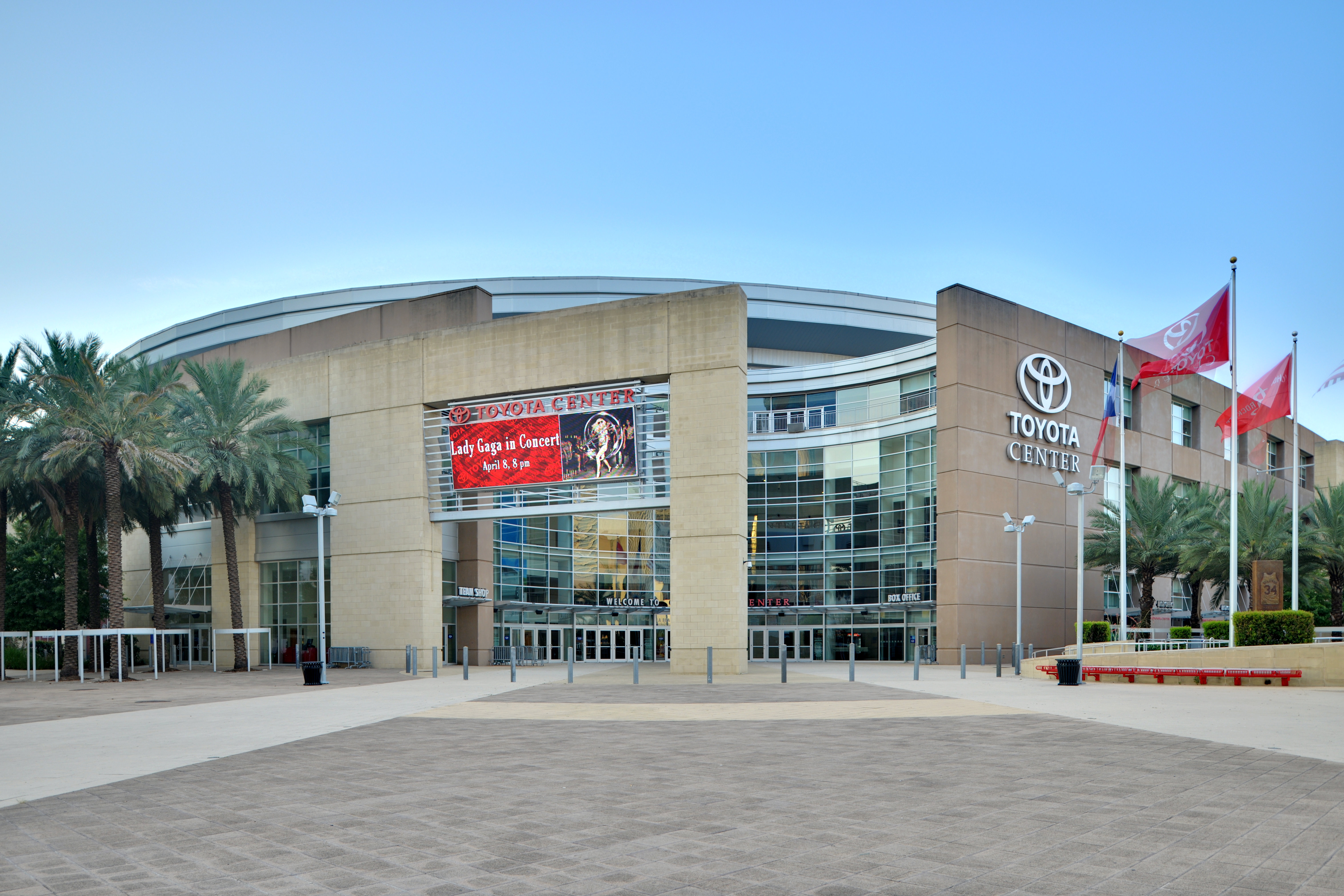
The seventh annual Vengeance, and inaugural Night of Champions, was held at the Toyota Center in Houston, Texas.

Vengeance was an annual professional wrestling pay-per-view (PPV) event produced by World Wrestling Entertainment (WWE) since 2001. The first event was held in December but then became the annual July PPV in 2002, before moving up to June in 2005. Up until 2006, the event was promoted solely as Vengeance, but in 2007, WWE retitled the seventh Vengeance as "Vengeance: Night of Champions". It was scheduled for June 24, 2007, at the Toyota Center in Houston, Texas. While the previous three Vengeance events were held exclusively for the Raw brand, the 2007 event featured wrestlers from Raw, SmackDown!, and ECW, as following WrestleMania 23 in April, brand-exclusive PPVs were discontinued, subsequently making this the first Vengeance since 2002 to feature multiple brands and the first to include ECW which was introduced as a third brand in May 2006.

With the event's subtitle of "Night of Champions", the theme of the event was that every active championship promoted by WWE at the time was contested. These included the four championships on Raw—the WWE Championship, the Intercontinental Championship, the World Tag Team Championship, and the WWE Women's Championship—the four championships on SmackDown!—the World Heavyweight Championship, the United States Championship, the WWE Tag Team Championship, and the WWE Cruiserweight Championship—and ECW's sole championship—the ECW World Championship.

The "Night of Champions" name was originally used by the former World Championship Wrestling (WCW) for the final broadcast of WCW Monday Nitro in March 2001; WCW was acquired by WWE, at the time known as the World Wrestling Federation (WWF, renamed in 2002), that same month. The broadcast saw every WCW championship defended.

=== Storylines ===
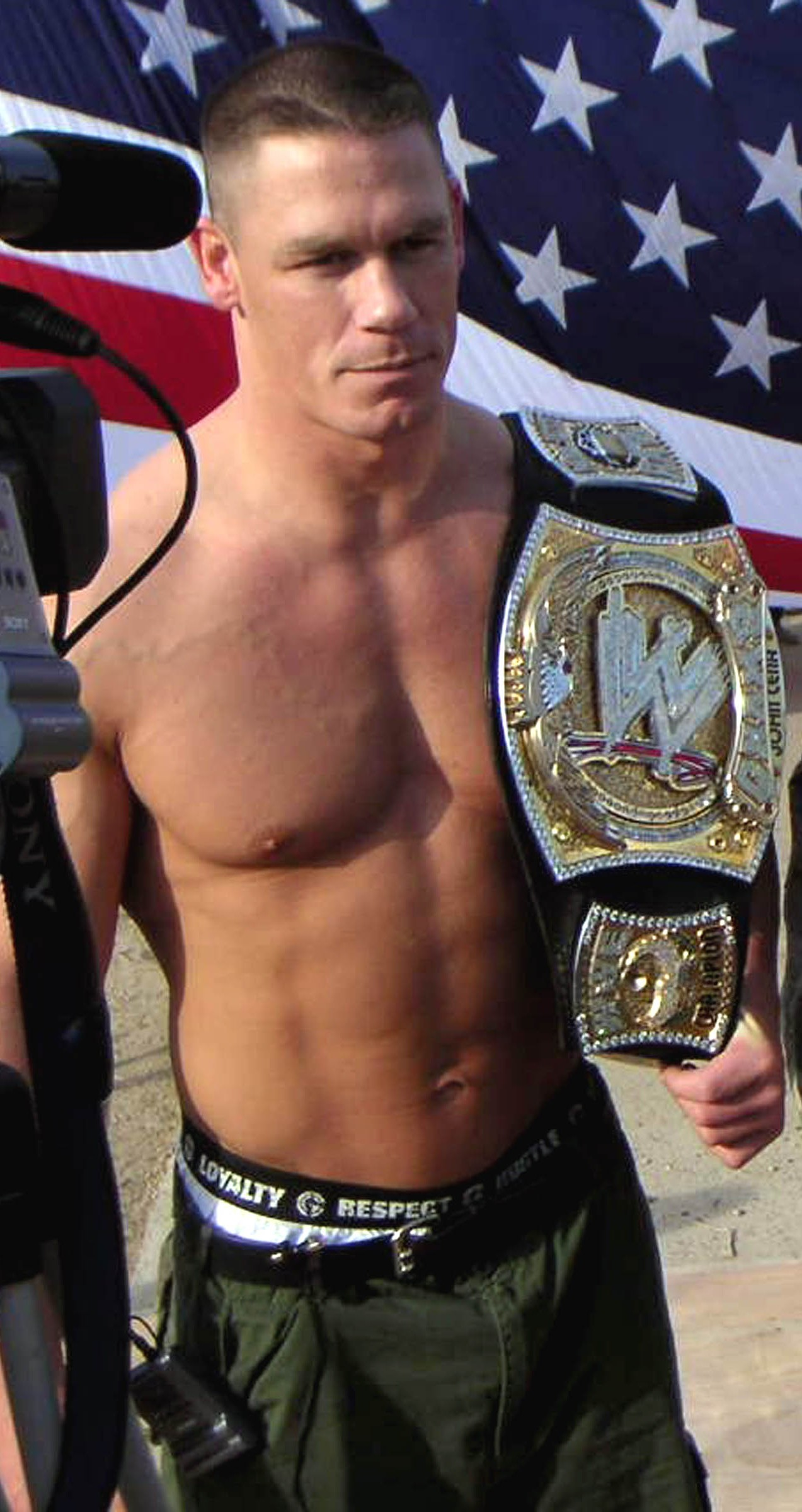
John Cena as Raw's WWE Champion.

The main feud on the Raw brand heading into the event was between WWE Champion John Cena, Bobby Lashley, King Booker, Mick Foley, and Randy Orton. The feud began when Lashley was drafted to Raw and stripped of the ECW World Championship. After being stripped of the title, Lashley began to pursue the WWE Championship. On the June 18 episode of Raw, Foley, Orton, Booker, and Lashley all cut promos on why they deserve to be the number-one contender to the WWE Championship. Cena also cut a promo on who he believed deserved to be the number one contender to the championship. Following this, Interim General Manager Jonathan Coachman announced that all five men would compete for the title in a match billed as the "WWE Championship Challenge" at Vengeance.

The main feud heading into Vengeance on the SmackDown! brand was between World Heavyweight Champion Edge and Batista. Their match stemmed from their Steel Cage match at One Night Stand, three weeks before Vengeance, where Edge won by escaping the cage. On the June 8 episode of SmackDown!, WWE Chairman Vince McMahon announced that Edge would defend the World Heavyweight Championship against Batista in a Last Chance match at Vengeance.

The feud between The Hardys (Jeff Hardy and Matt Hardy) and Lance Cade and Trevor Murdoch began at Backlash. At Backlash, The Hardys defeated Cade and Murdoch to retain Raw's World Tag Team Championship. At the following event, Judgment Day, Matt and Jeff defeated Cade and Murdoch once again to retain the title.

== Event ==
Other on-screen personnel
Role:	Name:
English commentators	Jim Ross (Raw)
English commentators	Jerry Lawler (Raw)
English commentators	Michael Cole (SmackDown!)
English commentators	John "Bradshaw" Layfield (SmackDown!)
English commentators	Joey Styles (ECW)
English commentators	Tazz (ECW)
Spanish commentators	Carlos Cabrera
Spanish commentators	Hugo Savinovich
Interviewer	Todd Grisham
Ring announcer	Justin Roberts (Raw)
Ring announcer	Tony Chimel (SmackDown/ECW)
Referees	Charles Robinson
Referees	Mike Chioda
Referees	Chad Patton
Referees	Jack Doan
Referees	Mickie Henson
Referees	Marty Elias
Referees	Jim Korderas
Referees	Scott Armstrong
Referees	Mark Yeaton

=== Preliminary matches ===
Before the event aired live on pay-per-view, Super Crazy defeated Carlito in a dark match.

The first match was between Lance Cade and Trevor Murdoch and The Hardys (Matt and Jeff) for the World Tag Team Championship. Cade and Matt started the match, with Matt in control. The two teams tagged in and out until Cade and Murdoch attempted to walk out of the match, but the Hardys went after them, and brought them back into the ring. Jeff attempted a Swanton Bomb onto Cade, but Murdoch interfered on Cade's behalf. Matt tried to interfere on Jeff's behalf, but was stopped by the referee. Murdoch used this as an advantage, and pushed Jeff off the turnbuckle, leading to Cade performing a powerbomb. Cade gained the pinfall on Jeff to win the match and retain the titles.

The second match was between Chavo Guerrero and Jimmy Wang Yang for the WWE Cruiserweight Championship. The match began with Yang and Guerrero locking up, followed by Yang in control through most of the match. After Yang missed a moonsault, Guerrero executed a Gory Bomb. Shortly after, Guerrero performed a Frog Splash on Yang. Afterwards, Guerrero pinned Yang to win the match and retain the Cruiserweight Championship.

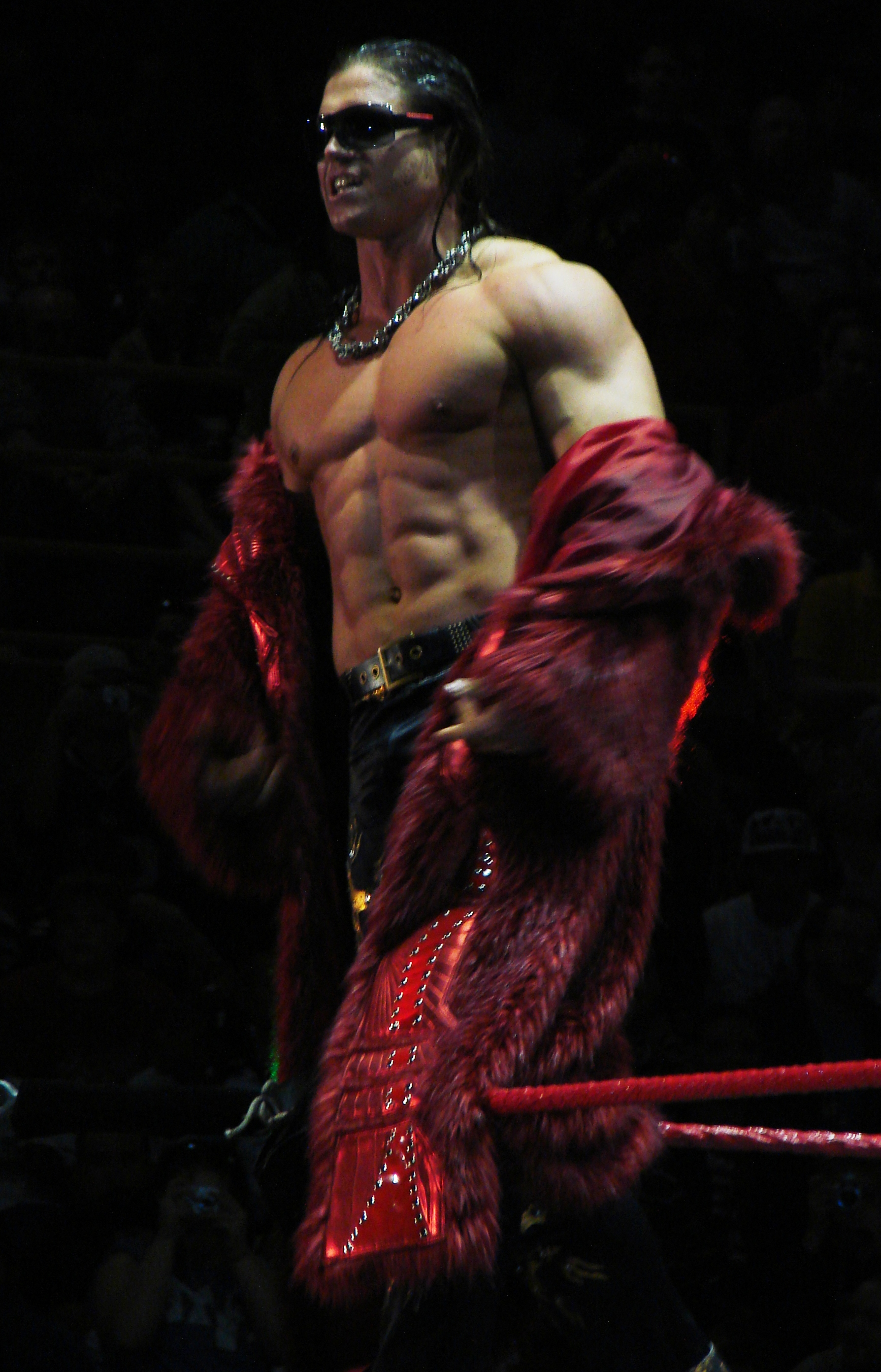
Johnny Nitro (pictured) faced CM Punk for the vacant ECW World Championship.

The third match was between CM Punk and Johnny Nitro (who replaced the absent Chris Benoit) for the ECW World Championship. The match started off with Punk attempting a crossbody on Nitro. Nitro countered, however, and executed an enzuigiri. Nitro delivered a corkscrew neckbreaker and pinned Punk to win the match to become the new ECW World Champion.

The fourth match was between Santino Marella and Umaga for the WWE Intercontinental Championship. The match began with Umaga in control, squashing Marella. Two minutes into the match, Umaga was punching Marella uncontrollably. The referee disqualified Umaga when he refused to stop after giving a five count, and Marella retained the title. Umaga, following the disqualification, delivered a splash and a Samoan Spike to Santino.

The fifth match was between Montel Vontavious Porter (MVP) and Ric Flair for the WWE United States Championship. The match started with Flair executing a series of backhand chops to MVP. Flair kept the advantage and applied the figure-four leglock. MVP countered, by executing a low blow. MVP then performed the Playmaker and pinned Flair to retain the United States Championship.

The sixth match was an open challenge by Deuce 'n Domino to any tag team for the WWE Tag Team Championship, which was accepted by Jimmy Snuka, who was Deuce's real-life father, and Sgt. Slaughter. Snuka and Slaughter controlled most of the match; however, Deuce 'n Domino got the win after Deuce pinned Snuka. After the match, Deuce 'n Domino attacked Snuka and Slaughter until Tony Garea and Rick Martel came into the ring to assist Snuka and Slaughter.

=== Main event matches ===
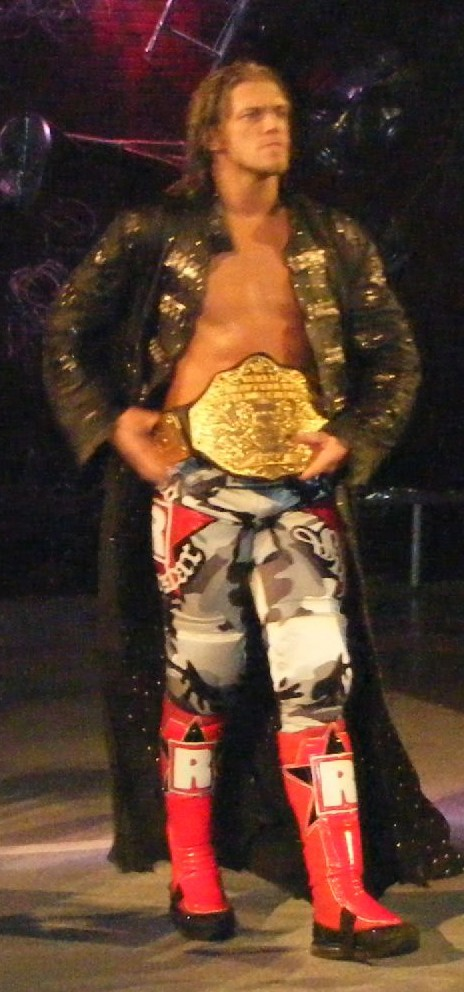
Edge defended SmackDown!'s World Heavyweight Championship against Batista at the event.

The seventh match was between Edge and Batista for the World Heavyweight Championship. This was a Last Chance match, meaning if Batista lost, he could not get another shot at the World Heavyweight Championship as long as Edge was champion. Batista originally won the match by disqualification after Edge executed a low blow; however, SmackDown! General Manager Theodore Long restarted the match with the stipulation that Edge could lose the title by disqualification. Edge won the match after Batista was counted out, thus retaining the title, and with the match stipulation, Batista would be unable to challenge for the World Heavyweight Championship as long as Edge was the champion. After the match, in complete frustration, Batista attacked Edge and performed a Batista Bomb on him outside of the ring onto the ground before leaving him with the title.

The eighth match was Melina against Candice Michelle for the WWE Women's Championship. After a back and forth match, Michelle executed a spinning heel kick on Melina to win the Women's Championship.

The main event, billed as the "WWE Championship Challenge", saw John Cena defending the WWE Championship against King Booker, Bobby Lashley, Mick Foley, and Randy Orton. Throughout the match, all five men gained an advantage over one-another at one or more spots. One spot in the match saw Lashley dive over the top rope onto the other four competitors. Towards the end of the match, Cena executed an FU on Lashley through an announce table. Cena won the match and retained the title after pinning Foley following an FU.

== Aftermath ==
The scheduled June 25 episode of Raw was going to be a three-hour memorial to "Mr. McMahon". However, due to the real-life death of Chris Benoit, the show opened with McMahon standing in an empty WWE arena, acknowledging that his reported death was only of his character as part of a storyline. This was followed by a tribute to Chris Benoit that filled the three-hour timeslot. Once the details of Benoit's actions became apparent, WWE made the decision to remove nearly all mentions of Chris Benoit from their website, future broadcasts, and all publications.

Chavo Guerrero went on to defend the WWE Cruiserweight Championship in a Cruiserweight Open at The Great American Bash against Jimmy Wang Yang, Jamie Noble, Funaki, and Shannon Moore. Hornswoggle also entered the match at the bell, but immediately escaped the ring and hid under it. With all of the cruiserweights down, with the exception of Noble, Hornswoggle came out from under the ring and delivered a Tadpole Splash to Noble. He pinned him afterwards to win the match and the Cruiserweight Championship.

Candice Michelle and Melina continued to feud over the WWE Women's Championship. The two had a rematch at The Great American Bash for the title. Michelle pinned Melina after delivering a Candy Wrapper to retain the title.

On the July 2 episode of Raw, Umaga defeated Santino Marella in a rematch to capture the Intercontinental Championship. Two weeks later, Jeff Hardy defeated William Regal, Shelton Benjamin, and Santino Marella in a fatal four-way elimination match to become the number one contender to the Intercontinental Championship. At The Great American Bash, Umaga defeated Hardy to retain the title after the Samoan Spike. That same night, Bobby Lashley won a "Beat the Clock" tournament to become the number-one contender to the WWE Championship. At The Great American Bash, Lashley faced John Cena for the WWE Championship in the main event. Cena retained the title after an FU from the top rope.

On the June 26 episode of ECW on Sci Fi, CM Punk defeated Elijah Burke in a two out of three falls match to become the number one contender to the ECW World Championship. At The Great American Bash, Punk faced John Morrison (formerly known as Johnny Nitro) for the ECW World Championship. Morrison retained the title after hitting Punk with both of his knees. 18 years after their planned match at this event, Punk referred to this incident in a promo on the April 6, 2026 episode of Raw where he described the ghosts that still haunt him to this day referring to Benoit.

On the July 6 episode of SmackDown!, Kane was named the number one contender to the World Heavyweight Championship after he appeared as the special guest on Edge's Cutting Edge segment. Edge held a celebration for himself on the July 13 episode of SmackDown!, and was attacked by Kane, who in the process legitimately injured Edge. On the July 20 episode of SmackDown!, Edge was forced to vacate the World Heavyweight Championship as a result of his injury. The Great Khali went on to win a 20-man battle royal to become the new World Heavyweight Champion. At The Great American Bash, Khali defended the title successfully against Kane and Batista in a triple threat match.

Vengeance: Night of Champions would be the final Vengeance until the event was reinstated in 2011, as WWE decided to drop Vengeance in 2008 in favor of continuing Night of Champions as its own PPV chronology. This 2007 event would also be the only Vengeance to feature the ECW brand, as it was disbanded in 2010, and it was the final Vengeance to occur during the first brand extension, which ended in August 2011, two months before the 2011 event; in April 2011, WWE ceased using its full name with the "WWE" abbreviation becoming an orphaned initialism. Additionally, this would be the only Night of Champions event, as well as the final Vengeance event, to feature the original Cruiserweight Championship, as the title was retired in September 2007, and it was the only Vengeance event to feature the ECW World Championship, and the final Vengeance event to feature the World Tag Team Championship and WWE Women's Championship, as the three titles were retired in February, August, and September 2010, respectively. Night of Champions continued as an annual PPV until its 2015 event, which was the final Night of Champions, as it was replaced by the similarly themed Clash of Champions in 2016. However, Night of Champions was reinstated in 2023; while Vengeance was revived in 2021 for the NXT brand, thus renaming that event Vengeance Day at first as part of the TakeOver series then its own event the following year.

== Results ==
No.	Results	Stipulations	Times
1^{D}	Super Crazy defeated Carlito by pinfall	Singles match	—
2	Lance Cade and Trevor Murdoch (c) defeated The Hardys (Matt Hardy and Jeff Hardy) by pinfall	Tag team match for the World Tag Team Championship	8:55
3	Chavo Guerrero (c) defeated Jimmy Wang Yang by pinfall	Singles match for the WWE Cruiserweight Championship	9:16
4	Johnny Nitro defeated CM Punk by pinfall	Singles match for the vacant ECW World Championship	8:00
5	Santino Marella (c) defeated Umaga by disqualification	Singles match for the WWE Intercontinental Championship	2:34
6	Montel Vontavious Porter (c) defeated Ric Flair by pinfall	Singles match for the WWE United States Championship	8:43
7	Deuce 'n Domino (c) (with Cherry) defeated Jimmy Snuka and Sgt. Slaughter by pinfall	Tag team match for the WWE Tag Team Championship	6:34
8	Edge (c) defeated Batista by countout	Last Chance match for the World Heavyweight Championship (Note: Batista initially won the match by disqualification, but Theodore Long restarted the match. Had Edge gotten himself disqualified for the second time, he would have lost the title.)	16:50
9	Candice Michelle defeated Melina (c)	Singles match for the WWE Women's Championship	04:07
10	John Cena (c) defeated Bobby Lashley, King Booker (with Queen Sharmell), Mick Foley, and Randy Orton by pinfall	Five-Pack Challenge for the WWE Championship	10:08
(c) / – the champion(s) heading into the match; D / – this was a dark match

=== ECW World Championship Tournament bracket ===
Semifinals; ECW; June 19, 2007
CM Punk	Pinfall
Marcus Cor Von	6:45
Chris Benoit	Submission
Elijah Burke	6:38

Final; Vengeance: Night of Champions; June 24, 2007
CM Punk	Pinfall
Johnny Nitro (Note: Johnny Nitro was an impromptu replacement due to the absence of Chris Benoit, explained on-air as being due to “personal issues". It was later discovered by local Georgia law enforcement officials that Benoit had murdered his wife and son, and then committed suicide in their home.)	8:15
