= The New Breed (ECW) =

Professional wrestling stable

- The New Breed logo

Stable
- Members: Elijah Burke (leader); Marcus Cor Von; Matt Striker; Kevin Thorn; Ariel; CM Punk
- Debut: February 6, 2007
- Disbanded: June 2007
- Years active: 2007

The New Breed was a professional wrestling stable that appeared on the ECW brand of World Wrestling Entertainment (WWE) in 2007. It was originally composed of Elijah Burke and Marcus Cor Von. Matt Striker, Kevin Thorn, and Ariel first joined the stable in February 2007, then CM Punk briefly joined the stable in April 2007.

The faction was created to feud with wrestlers who had been a part of the original Extreme Championship Wrestling (ECW) promotion in the 1990s. WWE revived ECW as a third brand in 2006, and hired several former ECW wrestlers – the ECW Originals – to compete on the brand. In early 2007, the New Breed was created when Vince McMahon, the WWE chairman, touted Burke and Cor Von as the epitome of the new ECW, while insulting the ECW Originals. Striker, Thorn, and Ariel joined the following week.

The New Breed instantly began feuding with the ECW Originals. They faced off in several matches throughout the year, including at WrestleMania 23. After this, both groups began recruiting CM Punk, who elected to join the New Breed. Two weeks later however, he turned on Burke during a match. Thorn and Ariel left the stable shortly afterward as well. The New Breed continued to feud with the Originals and Punk, and also with The Major Brothers, a new tag team who had defeated Striker and Cor Von in their debut match. By June 2007, the stable had dissolved, with the three remaining members quietly separating. Today, only Punk remains the only member of The New Breed remaining employed by WWE, while Striker is signed with Major League Wrestling and Burke performs for National Wrestling Alliance.

== Concept ==
World Wrestling Entertainment (WWE) acquired Extreme Championship Wrestling (ECW) and its video library in 2003, and later began reintroducing ECW by utilizing ECW library content for DVDs and releasing a series of books. The popularity of ECW merchandise prompted WWE to organize an ECW reunion pay-per-view, ECW One Night Stand, in 2005. WWE organized a second One Night Stand pay-per-view the following year. In May 2006 WWE announced the launch of ECW as a stand-alone brand, congruous to Raw and SmackDown!, with its own show on the Sci Fi channel. In preparation for the launch of the ECW brand, WWE hired several original ECW wrestlers, including Sabu, The Sandman, and Balls Mahoney. It was also announced that wrestlers who had previously worked for ECW before joining WWE following its closure, including Rob Van Dam and Tommy Dreamer, would be moving to the new ECW brand.

The term "new breed" was originally used to describe the revived ECW brand as a whole, with advertisements and articles using the tagline "A new breed unleashed". In early 2007, the term began to be used as the name for a new stable (faction) on the new ECW brand, which consisted solely of wrestlers that had not been a part of the original ECW. This stable quickly began feuding with the ECW Originals – wrestlers who had been part of the original ECW.

== History ==
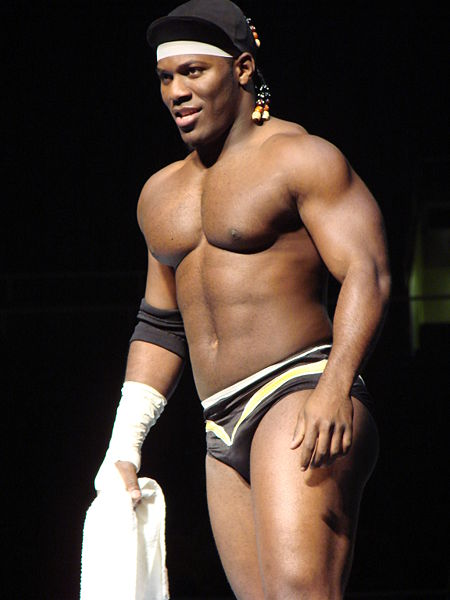
Elijah Burke was the leader of The New Breed

=== Formation ===
On January 30, 2007, Vince McMahon, the chairman of WWE, appeared on ECW on Sci Fi. In several backstage segments, he showed disdain for wrestlers that were a part of the original ECW – the ECW Originals. While demeaning the Originals, McMahon simultaneously showed appreciation for newer wrestlers, calling Marcus Cor Von "a breath of fresh air" and bringing Elijah Burke to the ring with him to tout Burke as the epitome of the new ECW. As a result, Tommy Dreamer, Balls Mahoney, Sabu, and The Sandman interrupted and attacked Burke, provoking a feud. The next week, McMahon appeared on ECW again, insulting Dreamer, Mahoney, Sabu, The Sandman, and Rob Van Dam, before informing them that they would be fired if they interfered in each other's matches that night. Matt Striker and Kevin Thorn, along with his valet Ariel, joined forces with Burke and Cor Von as the New Breed. Striker was named the special guest referee for Thorn's match with Dreamer that night, and refused to count a pinfall for Dreamer, allowing Thorn to win. Burke defeated Van Dam later in the night, and the New Breed members attacked Van Dam until they were chased off by the other ECW Originals. The feud continued throughout March and April, with the factions facing off against each other in several singles and tag team matches.

In early March, Dreamer challenged the New Breed to a match at WrestleMania 23 on behalf of the Originals. The following week, Dreamer won a battle royal featuring members of the New Breed and the Originals. In the final weeks leading up to WrestleMania, the stables continued to clash, with Van Dam defeating Burke on the March 27 episode of ECW. This provoked an attack on Van Dam by the other New Breed members, until the Originals made the save. At WrestleMania, the New Breed members lost to the ECW Originals in an eight-man tag team match, but on the following episode of ECW on Sci Fi, they defeated the ECW Originals in an extreme rules rematch.

=== Recruiting CM Punk ===
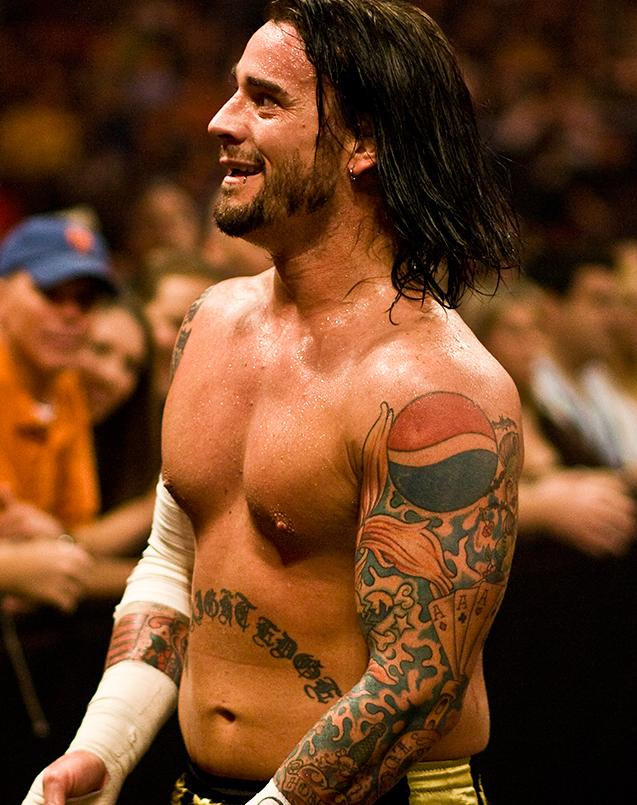
CM Punk was recruited by both the New Breed and the ECW Originals

Just prior to WrestleMania, both the New Breed and the ECW Originals began attempting to recruit CM Punk into their stables. On the April 3 episode of ECW, Cor Von eventually told Punk to choose a side, stating that Punk was either with the New Breed or against them. The following week, Punk made his decision and joined the New Breed, shaking hands with Burke in the ring. The next week, his presence immediately created tension within the group, as he berated Cor Von and Thorn for losing and undermined Burke's position as the leader of the New Breed. Later that episode, Burke faced Van Dam in a singles match. Punk attempted to interfere, sliding a steel chair into the ring, but Van Dam got to it first and hit Burke with it. Afterward, Punk apologized to Burke. The following week, Punk apologized again, but was forced by Burke to miss an eight-man elimination tag team match between the Originals and the New Breed. In retaliation, Punk attacked Burke, causing him to lose the match, and left the New Breed, before defecting to the side of the ECW Originals.

The following week, on the May 1 episode of ECW, Burke announced a match between Thorn and Punk, which Thorn lost. After the match, Thorn quit the New Breed, as none of the other members interfered during the match to help him. That same night, Striker and Cor Von lost to the debuting tag team of The Major Brothers (Brian and Brett). Striker was pinned and as a result, Burke blamed Striker, berating him for the loss and creating tension between the two. The following week, Cor Von defeated Punk in a singles match following interference from Burke, and Burke defeated one-half of The Major Brothers, Brian. Punk gained revenge at the Judgment Day pay-per-view in late May however, when he defeated Burke in a singles match. On the next episode of ECW, Striker defeated Brett Major while Burke and Cor Von lost to the team of Van Dam and Punk by disqualification when Cor Von attacked Punk despite not being the legal man in the match. After this, Van Dam was moved into a feud with Randy Orton and Punk joined forces with Dreamer and The Sandman to replace Sabu, who had left WWE in mid-May. At the One Night Stand pay-per-view in June, Burke, Cor Von, and Striker lost to Punk, Dreamer, and The Sandman in a tables match.

=== Dissolution and aftermath ===
In mid-2007, the New Breed was phased out as a group. Cor Von and Burke remained loosely aligned and teamed together on a few occasions until mid-June. After this, Cor Von took an extended leave of absence before being released from the company in September. Burke remained part of ECW and received a push in late June and July, challenging for the ECW World Championship on several occasions. Throughout the remainder of 2007 and most of 2008, he was rarely used in a prominent role and was released in November 2008.

Ariel was released from WWE on May 18, shortly after she and Thorn left the New Breed. Thorn remained on ECW for several months, but was sent to WWE's developmental territory in early 2008. He was eventually released from his contract in early 2009. Following his release, he criticized the storylines in which the stable was involved, especially the fact that the stable was used to push CM Punk, stating that it "could have been done differently". Fertig also felt that there was "so much more" that could have done with the stable, due to "eclectic" mix of people involved. Following the dissolution of the New Breed, Striker began managing wrestler Big Daddy V until 2008. He later transitioned into a commentator role in August 2008, and worked in a variety of roles, including as the host of WWE NXT and a backstage interviewer, until WWE opted not to renew his contract in June 2013. CM Punk won the ECW Championship in September 2007 and, after leaving the ECW brand in 2008, he went on to become a three-time original World Heavyweight Champion, as well as a two-time WWE Champion and a two-time World Heavyweight Champion. Punk then acrimonously left WWE in early 2014 due to injuries; but returned to professional wrestling for All Elite Wrestling in 2021 before making his return to the WWE in 2023.

== See also ==
- ECW Originals
- ECW (WWE)
