= Elijah Burke =

American professional wrestler (born 1981)

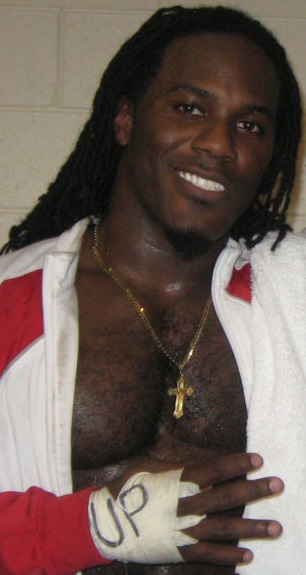
- Burke in 2007

Personal information
- Born: Elijah Samuel Burke; May 24, 1981 (age 45) Jacksonville, Florida, U.S.

Professional wrestling career
- Ring name(s): D'Angelo Dinero; The Pope; Elijah Burke; General Pope; Da Pope
- Billed height: 6 ft 1 in (1.85 m)
- Billed weight: 230 lb (100 kg)
- Billed from: Big Bear, California; Jacksonville, Florida "The Streets of Harlem, New York"
- Trained by: Ohio Valley Wrestling
- Debut: 2003

Elijah Samuel Burke (born May 24, 1981), also known by the alias "Da Pope", is an American professional wrestler who works for the National Wrestling Alliance (NWA).

Burke started his pro-wrestling career in 2003, working for World Wrestling Entertainment, first competing in their developmental territory Ohio Valley Wrestling (OVW), and later on their main roster from 2006 to 2008. While in WWE, he would occasionally do commentary during events, but was primarily used as a wrestler, especially as part of The New Breed stable. Burke was the final opponent of Chris Benoit.

From 2009 to 2013, and again from 2015 to 2017, Burke worked for Total Nonstop Action Wrestling/Impact Wrestling, with his first stint as a wrestler (under the ring name D'Angelo Dinero), and the second stint as one of their main television commentators. Burke has won the OVW Heavyweight Championship, OVW Television Championship, and OVW Southern Tag Team Championship, and was voted Most Improved Wrestler of the Year in 2010 by Pro Wrestling Illustrated (PWI). He is also a one-time NWA World Television Champion.

Prior to his professional wrestling career, Burke worked as a law enforcement officer in Jacksonville, Florida. He was dual certified, and later gaining a degree in criminal justice. He also was as an amateur boxer and toughman competitor, a background that influenced his pro-wrestling style. In 2014 Burke was inducted into the Guns ‘N Hoses Boxing Hall of Fame at The Jacksonville Veterans Coliseum.

== Law enforcement and boxing backgrounds ==
Burke is a former officer for the Jacksonville Sheriff's Office in Florida who started in corrections before crossing over to the street. He would become an amateur boxer during this time as well as a toughman competitor in Jacksonville's Club 5 and Club Plush, where he would amass a 98–1 win–loss record in the span of 3 years. According to his WWE.com profile, Burke has a record of 103–1 with 102 knockouts in his amateur career. According to WWE, the only loss he sustained was a disqualification, after he knocked his opponent out and refused to back down to his corner. Before each of his matches he writes the phrase "4-Up" on his wrist tape, and in an interview with WWE Magazine, Burke stated that this came from the phrase "I'm going to give you five upside your head," used by comedians such as Redd Foxx. However, when you punch somebody, it's more accurately four upside the head. On the "Right After Wrestling" program on Sirius Satellite Radio Channel 98, Burke told hosts Arda Ocal and Jimmy Korderas that early in his professional wrestling career, he never threw worked punches due to having difficulty pulling his punches.

== Professional wrestling career ==
=== World Wrestling Entertainment (2004–2008) ===
==== Ohio Valley Wrestling (2004–2006) ====
After signing with WWE, he was sent to their developmental territory, Ohio Valley Wrestling (OVW). There, he won the Heavyweight Championship on December 8, 2004, by defeating Chad Toland. On April 14 Burke lost the championship to Matt Morgan. While in OVW, Burke was offered a spot in the Spirit Squad by WWE's creative team, but turned it down, which forced him to stay in OVW longer before moving to SmackDown! with Sylvester Terkay.

==== The New Breed (2006–2007) ====
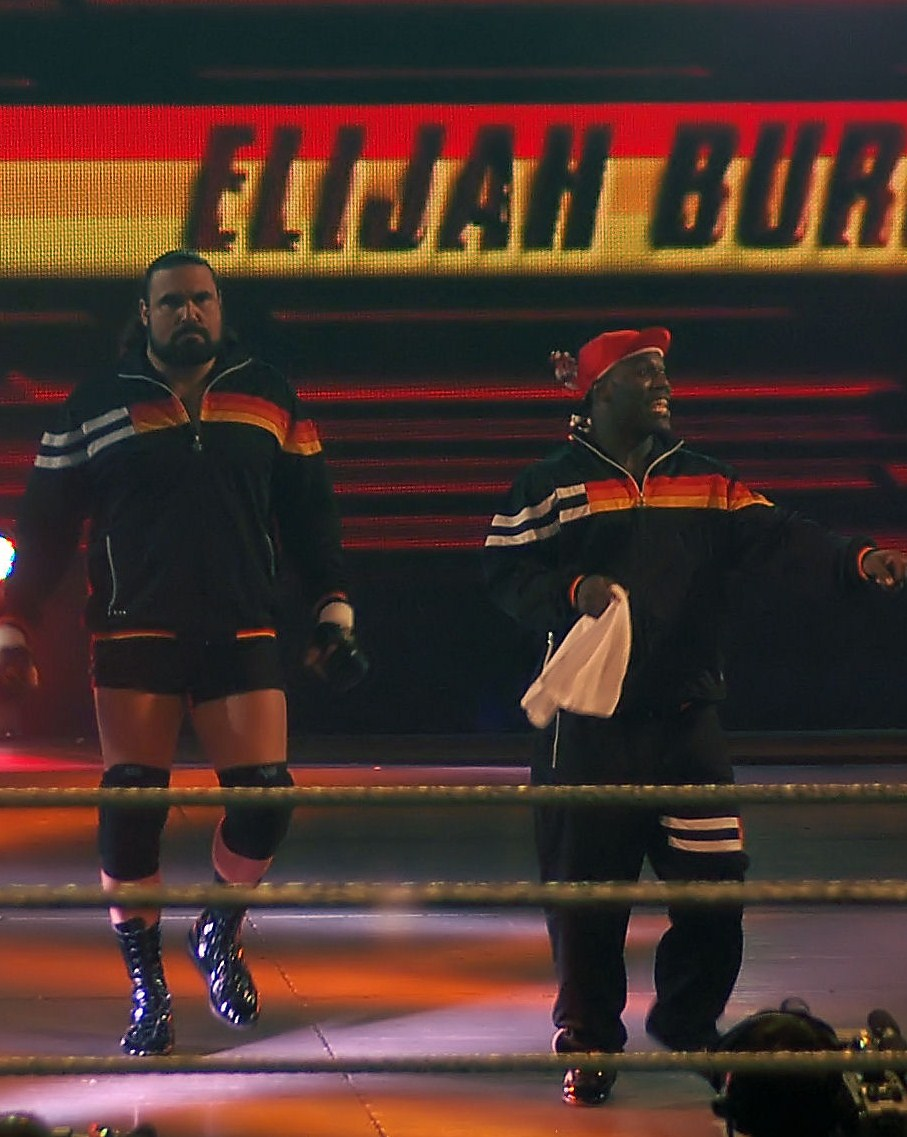
Burke (right) with Sylvester Terkay at December to Dismember

Burke would be brought up to the main roster of SmackDown! on July 28, 2006, working a mixed martial arts cornerman gimmick with the also debuting former MMA fighter Sylvester Terkay. His first WWE match saw him defeating Scott Wright and he would also break Vito's four month winning streak while on SmackDown!, albeit with Terkay's assistance.

On November 7, 2006, Burke and Terkay debuted on the ECW brand by cutting a backstage promo. The following week, Burke replaced Tazz, who had knee surgery, as color commentator alongside play-by-play announcer Joey Styles. Two weeks later, Burke returned to the ring; he and Terkay lost to the Hardy Boyz (Jeff Hardy and Matt Hardy). At the ECW brand's December to Dismember pay-per-view, Burke and Terkay defeated the Full Blooded Italians (Little Guido and Tony Mamaluke). The pair were later dubbed The Knock-Out/Tap-Out Connection, in reference to Burke's amateur boxing career and Terkay's mixed martial arts background. On January 18, 2007, Terkay was released from WWE.

Following this, Burke usually wrestled in singles matches, and appeared in a segment where WWE owner Vince McMahon showed disdain for members of the original ECW and called Burke to the ring, naming him "The Future of ECW." Burke was then attacked by Tommy Dreamer, Rob Van Dam, Sabu, and The Sandman, who would later form the ECW Originals stable. Burke then became the official leader of The New Breed, a group of new ECW stars including Matt Striker, Marcus Cor Von and Kevin Thorn, who proceeded to feud with the ECW Originals. At WrestleMania 23, The New Breed faced the ECW Originals but were defeated.

After several weeks of trying to recruit fellow roster mate and new ECW superstar CM Punk, Burke and the New Breed were successful on April 10. Just two weeks later, however, Punk betrayed the New Breed, attacking Burke after a match. The next week, Thorn quit the New Breed due to lack of interference in his match with Punk. The same night, Striker and Cor Von were defeated by the debuting Major Brothers (Brian Major and Brett Major). After being pinned, Burke screamed at Striker creating tension between the two. The New Breed would then feud with the ECW Originals, Punk and the Major Brothers at the same time. At Judgment Day, Burke was defeated by Punk. Then, at One Night Stand, Burke, Cor Von and Striker were defeated by Dreamer, The Sandman and Punk in a tables match, ending the New Breed stable.

==== Singles competition and departure (2007–2008) ====
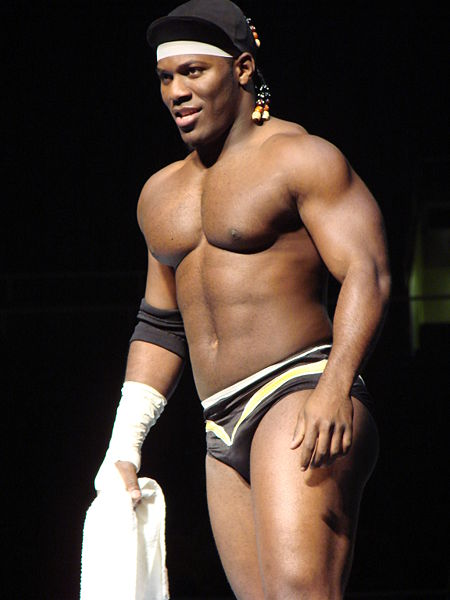
Burke in 2007

On June 19, 2007, Burke lost to Chris Benoit (which would be Benoit's last match before his death) in a match that would decide who would face either CM Punk or Marcus Cor Von for the vacant ECW World Championship at Vengeance: Night of Champions. Burke then lost to Punk in a two out of three falls match, which would see the winner becoming the number-one contender to Johnny Nitro's ECW World Championship. On July 10, Burke rebounded with a decisive victory over Balls Mahoney. He was then named the number one contender for the ECW Championship and went on to face Punk at the Unforgiven pay-per-view where he was beaten after Punk cleanly pinned him.

Two days later on ECW, an elimination chase was set up by ECW General Manager Armando Estrada. This challenge was to determine the number one contender to CM Punk's ECW Championship in order to compete for the title at No Mercy. Estrada pitted four ECW wrestlers (Burke, Kevin Thorn, Tommy Dreamer and Stevie Richards) against each other in a fatal four-way that night, which Burke won, removing the loser of the match, Richards, from contention. The following week, Thorn was eliminated and in the final match of the elimination chase, Burke was eliminated by Dreamer.

Towards the end of 2007, Burke had a short feud with then-World Heavyweight Champion Batista after Batista claimed his upcoming match with Burke was the last thing on his mind, thus disrespecting him and leading to two singles matches against Batista with Burke on the losing end of both. On the November 20 episode of ECW, Burke introduced and formed an alliance with the newest member of the ECW roster, Shelton Benjamin, who moved over from the Raw brand. Burke was then taken off television for several months but he later reappeared by participating in the 2008 Royal Rumble, entering as the 28th entrant but was eliminated by Triple H after having Mick Foley pushed into him, after which both Foley and Burke were eliminated.

He later participated in a 24-man battle royal at WrestleMania XXIV to determine who would face ECW Champion Chavo Guerrero Jr. Burke was eliminated early in the match (shortly after he himself eliminated Richards) by Kane. Burke then reappeared again in a tag team match on SmackDown where he and Shelton Benjamin faced Kofi Kingston and then-United States Champion Matt Hardy in a losing effort. Burke faced Hardy the following week in what would be his final televised match, but was unsuccessful. Burke later resurfaced once again in 2008 with a new "Black Pope" gimmick defeating Richards, Kung Fu Naki and Jamie Noble in dark matches.

On November 10, 2008, Burke was released from his WWE contract after being absent from television since May 2008.

=== Independent circuit (2008–2010, 2012–2015) ===
On November 16, 2008, One Pro Wrestling based in England announced that Burke would be appearing on their Friday the 13th show in February 2009, but was canceled. Burke appeared at the World Wrestling Council WWC) show LockOut on December 13, losing a hardcore three-way dance match, also involving Steve Corino, to Sabu. Later in January on an event named Euphoria, he teamed with Armando Alejandro Estrada to unsuccessfully challenge Thunder and Lightning for the WWC World Tag Team Championship. Burke appeared at the Blue Collar Wrestling Alliance (BCWA) show "Superslam 7" in Detroit, Michigan on April 12, 2009, winning in a singles match against local indy wrestler "The Reason" Black Velvet.

In 2012, he returned to WWC, defeating Ricky Banderas. He wrestled Carlito for the promotion in 2013. Burke made his return to the independent circuit on April 4, 2013, at Pro Wrestling Syndicate Super Card where he was defeated by John Morrison. Burke wrestled Jason Steel in WWC in December 2014. On January 1, 2015, he defeated Chicano. Burke made his return to Puerto Rico, but now in different promotion International Wrestling Association (IWA), defeating Gilbert.

=== Total Nonstop Action Wrestling (2009–2013) ===
==== Various feuds (2009–2011) ====
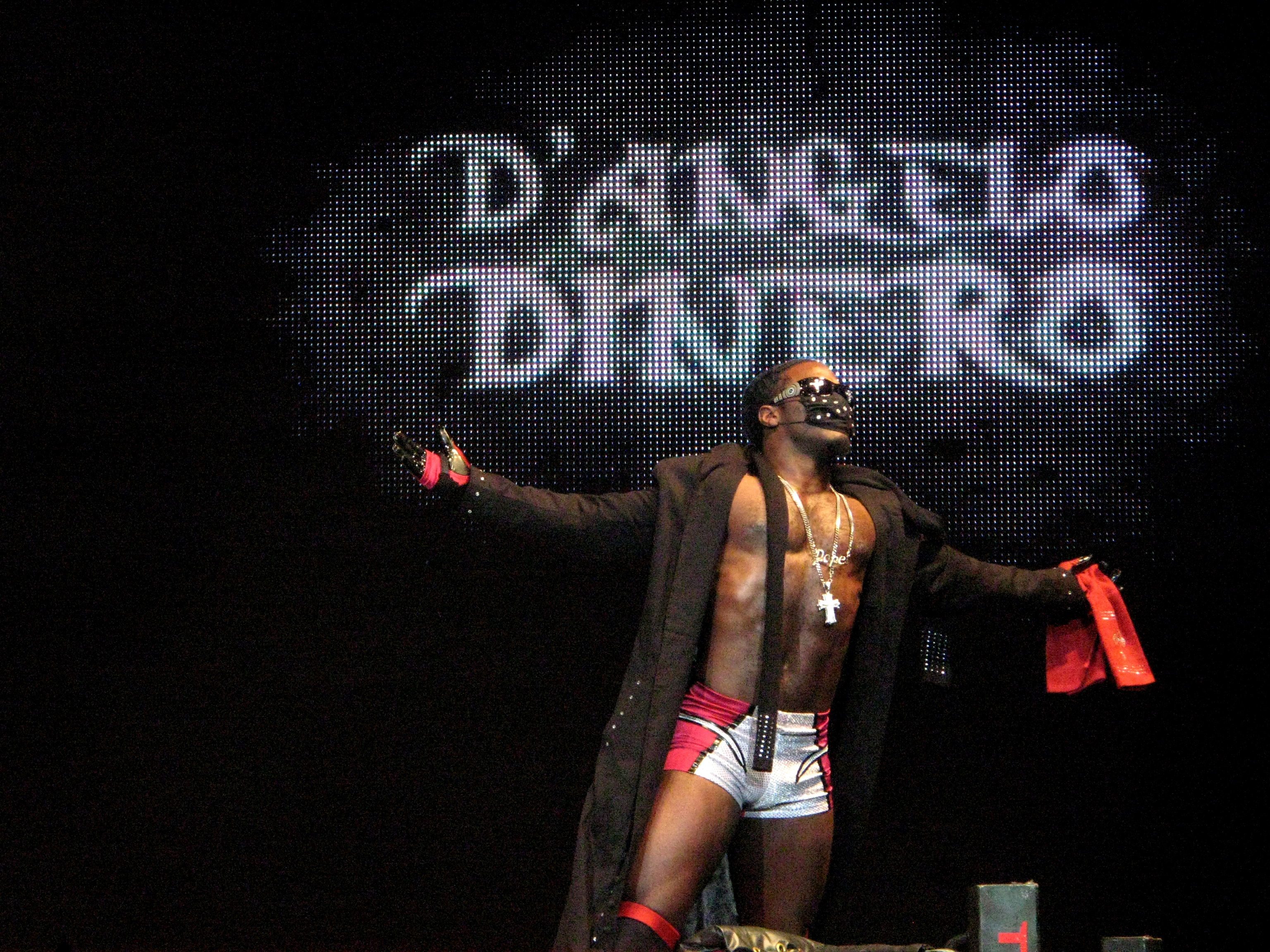
D'Angelo Dinero at a TNA wrestling event in 2010

On May 27, 2009, Burke defeated Shawn Spears in a tryout dark match for Total Nonstop Action Wrestling (TNA) at their TNA Impact! television tapings. On July 29, the Wrestling Observer Newsletter reported that Burke had signed a contract with TNA. On the August 6 episode of Impact! a vignette was aired that announced that Burke would be debuting under the ring name D'Angelo Dinero at Hard Justice. Burke made his debut as a heel on August 16 in the Steel Asylum match, which was won by Daniels. On August 20, 2009, he made his Impact! debut and defeated Consequences Creed before he was attacked by Suicide, who had lost the Steel Asylum match because of Dinero's interference. On the September 17 episode of Impact!, Dinero defeated Suicide. At No Surrender, Dinero defeated Suicide once again, this time in a "falls count anywhere" match. The following week on Impact! Suicide finally defeated Dinero, by pinning him in a street fight.

Burke was slated to take part in the Ultimate X match at Bound for Glory, but ended up missing the event due to a "family emergency." Dinero returned on the November 12 episode of Impact!, aligning himself with Matt Morgan and Hernandez against Team 3D and Rhino, which turned him face as a result. Three days later, on November 15, 2009, Dixie Carter announced on her Twitter account that Burke had signed a new long-term deal with the company. At Turning Point Rhino and Team 3D defeated Dinero, Morgan and Hernandez. On the following Impact! Rhino and Team 3D won the rematch as well, when Jesse Neal turned heel and joined them. On the December 3 episode Impact! Suicide accepted Dinero's offer for peace and joined him, Morgan and Hernandez in their war with Rhino, Team 3D and Neal. At Final Resolution Morgan, Hernandez, Dinero and Suicide defeated Neal, Team 3D and Rhino in an eight-man elimination tag team match.

On the January 4, 2010, special live three-hour Monday night episode of Impact!, Dinero defeated Desmond Wolfe. Two weeks later at Genesis, however, Wolfe avenged his loss and defeated Dinero in a rematch. On the February 4 episode of Impact!, Dinero scored a non-title victory over the World Heavyweight Champion, A.J. Styles. At Against All Odds Dinero defeated Desmond Wolfe, Matt Morgan and Mr. Anderson, despite being attacked by Scott Hall and Sean Waltman prior to the match, to win the 8 Card Stud Tournament and earn himself a shot at Styles' World Heavyweight Championship at Lockdown. Two months later, at Lockdown, Dinero failed in his attempt to win the World Heavyweight Championship from Styles. During the match Burke suffered ligament damage in his shoulder, which would sideline him for over two months. In storyline, Dinero's absence was attributed to Mr. Anderson attacking him backstage on the May 3 episode of Impact!. Dinero returned on the July 1 episode of Impact! and was immediately challenged to a match by Kurt Angle, who had vowed to go through TNA's top ten wrestlers in the Championship Committee's rankings and had now arrived to the man ranked number eight. At Victory Road Dinero was defeated by Angle in his return match. Afterwards, Dinero started a storyline with Mr. Anderson, who had recently turned face and wanted to prove his change to the man he had injured two months earlier by saving him from Matt Morgan. On the August 19 episode of Impact! the TNA World Heavyweight Championship was vacated and Dinero was entered into an eight-man tournament for it. In his first-round match he defeated Morgan to set up a semifinal match against Anderson. At No Surrender Anderson defeated Dinero to eliminate him from the tournament.

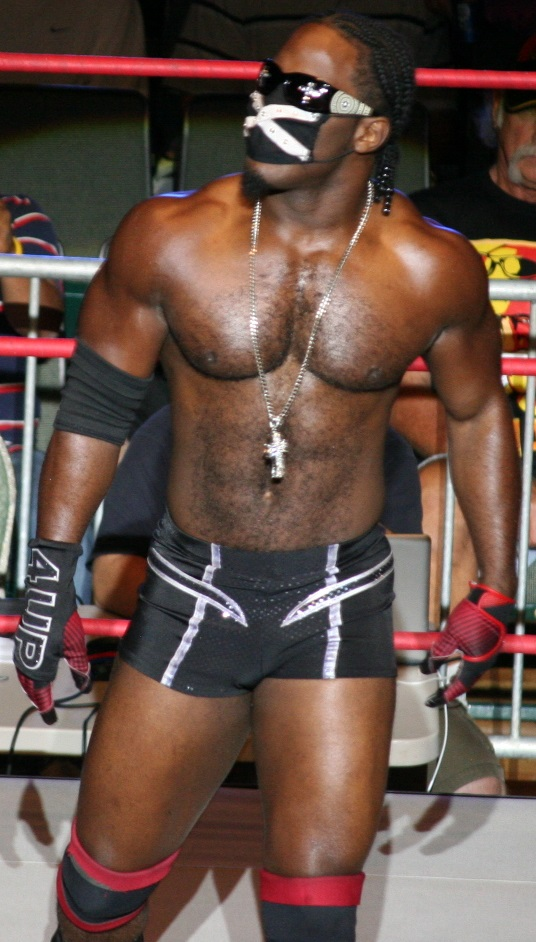
D'Angelo Dinero in October 2010

On the September 16 episode of Impact!, and the Reaction following it, Dinero seemingly turned heel by aligning himself with Kevin Nash and Sting, who had been feuding with Hulk Hogan, Eric Bischoff and Jeff Jarrett for months over the way TNA was run, claiming to know that they were up to something. Dinero later claimed to have gotten inside information from Bischoff's secretary Miss Tessmacher, that would suggest that Sting and Nash were right. At Bound for Glory Dinero, Sting and Nash faced Jeff Jarrett and Samoa Joe in a handicap match, after Hulk Hogan, who was scheduled to team with Jarrett and Joe, was forced to pull out due to a back surgery. At the end of the match Jarrett abandoned Joe and left him to be pinned by Nash. At the end of the event it was revealed that Sting and Nash had been right about Hogan and Bischoff all along, as they turned heel with Jarrett, Abyss and Jeff Hardy, and in the process turned Dinero, Sting and Nash back to being faces.

On the following episode of Impact! Sting and Nash refused to join Hogan's and Bischoff's new Immortal stable and instead walked out on TNA and Dixie Carter, noting that they had tried to warn her, but she had not listened. Dinero, now left alone, then became a target of the Immortal/Fortune alliance, with Fortune members A.J. Styles, Douglas Williams, Kazarian, James Storm and Robert Roode defeating him in a 5–on–1 handicap match. The following week Dinero received a shot at Styles' Television Championship in a street fight, but was defeated after an interference from Abyss. Afterwards, Dinero tried to form an alliance with Samoa Joe to fight Immortal and Fortune, but was turned down. At Turning Point Abyss defeated Dinero in a Lumberjack match, after Dinero's lumberjacks, including his own brother, turned on him, after being bought out by Eric Bischoff. The following month at Final Resolution Dinero was defeated by Abyss in a casket match.

On the following episode of Impact! Dinero started collecting donations in order to help those in need, however, after a vignette, filmed secretly by Samoa Joe's associate Okato, where Dinero visited a strip club, his true motivations were questioned by Joe on the January 6, 2011, episode of Impact!. On the January 27 episode of Impact!, Dinero completed his heel turn, talking down to the crowd at the Impact Zone and confessing his dislike of Samoa Joe. On February 13 at Against All Odds Dinero was defeated by Joe in a singles match. After the match Dinero attacked Joe and bloodied him. On the following episode of Impact!, Joe got his revenge on Dinero by giving him a muscle buster through a table, after Okato prevented him from escaping the ring. On the March 10 episode of Impact!, Dinero defeated Joe in a rematch between the two, after hitting him with a chain. On April 17 at Lockdown, Joe defeated Dinero in a steel cage match.

==== Storyline with Devon (2011–2013) ====
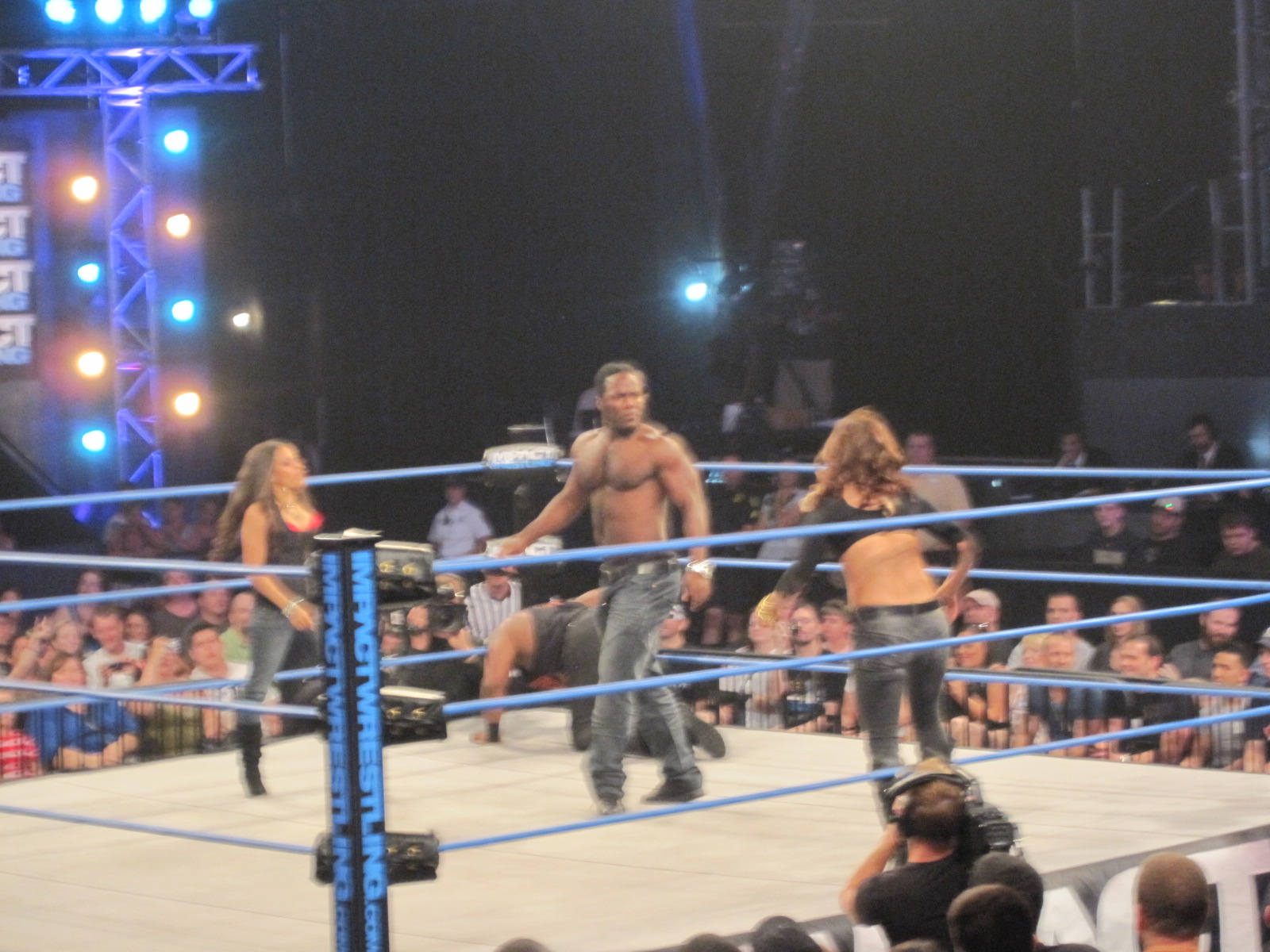
Dinero saving Devon from Mexican America

In June, Dinero helped Brother Devon in his feud with Mexican America, even though Devon tried to decline his help, claiming that he was a bad influence on his two sons Terrence and Terrell. Later that month, Dinero and Devon were both entered into the Bound for Glory Series to determine the number one contender for the TNA World Heavyweight Championship, during the course of which Dinero handed Devon a win in a tag team match, but Devon did not return the favor and save Dinero from a post-match assault at the hands of Samoa Joe. On August 7 at Hardcore Justice, Dinero defeated Devon in a Bound for Glory Series match. At the start of the match, Dinero offered to lay down for Devon, but the offer was refused.

Devon finally changed his attitude towards Dinero by saving him from Samoa Joe on the August 25 episode of Impact Wrestling. The attack however forced Dinero to pull out of the Bound for Glory Series with a storyline injury. On the September 8 episode of Impact Wrestling, Dinero and Devon defeated The British Invasion (Douglas Williams and Magnus) to become the number one contenders to the World Tag Team Championship. On September 11 at No Surrender, Dinero and Devon failed in their attempt to win the TNA World Tag Team Championship from Anarquia and Hernandez of Mexican America. On the December 1 episode of Impact Wrestling, Dinero and Devon defeated Ink Inc. (Jesse Neal and Shannon Moore) and Mexican America to become the number one contenders to the World Tag Team Championship, now held by the team of Crimson and Matt Morgan. On December 11 at Final Resolution, Dinero and Devon failed to capture the World Tag Team Championship. On the following episode of Impact Wrestling, Dinero, along with Terrence and Terrell, turned on Devon. On January 8, 2012, at Genesis, Terrence and Terrell turned on Dinero and helped their father defeat him in a singles match.

Dinero returned to TNA on the June 14 episode of Impact Wrestling, when he entered the 2012 Bound for Glory Series, taking part in the opening gauntlet match, from which he was eliminated by James Storm. After only one win and eight losses, Dinero suffered a legitimate shoulder injury and was sidelined from the tournament during its final weeks in mid-August. In storyline Dinero was sidelined as a result of being attacked by Aces & Eights at Hardcore Justice.

On January 8, 2013, Burke announced on Twitter that his TNA contract had expired on January 1, and he would not be re-signing with the company.

=== Return to OVW (2013–2015) ===
On September 11, 2013, Burke returned to Ohio Valley Wrestling and defeated Flash Flanagan to win the Television Championship. After defeating Flanagan to retain the OVW Television Championship in a rematch the following week, Burke successfully defended his title twice against Raul LaMotta and Rockstar Spud before losing the title to Shiloh Jonze on October 5 at the OVW Saturday Night Special. On October 9, 2013, Burke teamed with Eddie Diamond to defeat The Marauders (Joe Coleman and Shiloh Jonze), then made a challenged to Jonze for a title rematch. On October 16, Burke faced Shiloh Jonze in a Steel Cage match for the Television Championship but was unsuccessful.

On September 16, 2015, Burke made his return under the ring name General Pope, teaming with Private Anthony defeating Adam Revolver and Reverend Stuart Miles in a number one contenders match for an opportunity at the Southern Tag Team Championship. On December 5, The Band of Brothaz (General Pope and Private Anthony) defeated The Van Zandt Family Circus (Dapper Dan Van Zandt and The Ringmaster) to win the Southern Tag Team Championship. With this victory, Burke became the sixteenth triple crown champion in OVW history.

=== Return to TNA (2015–2017) ===
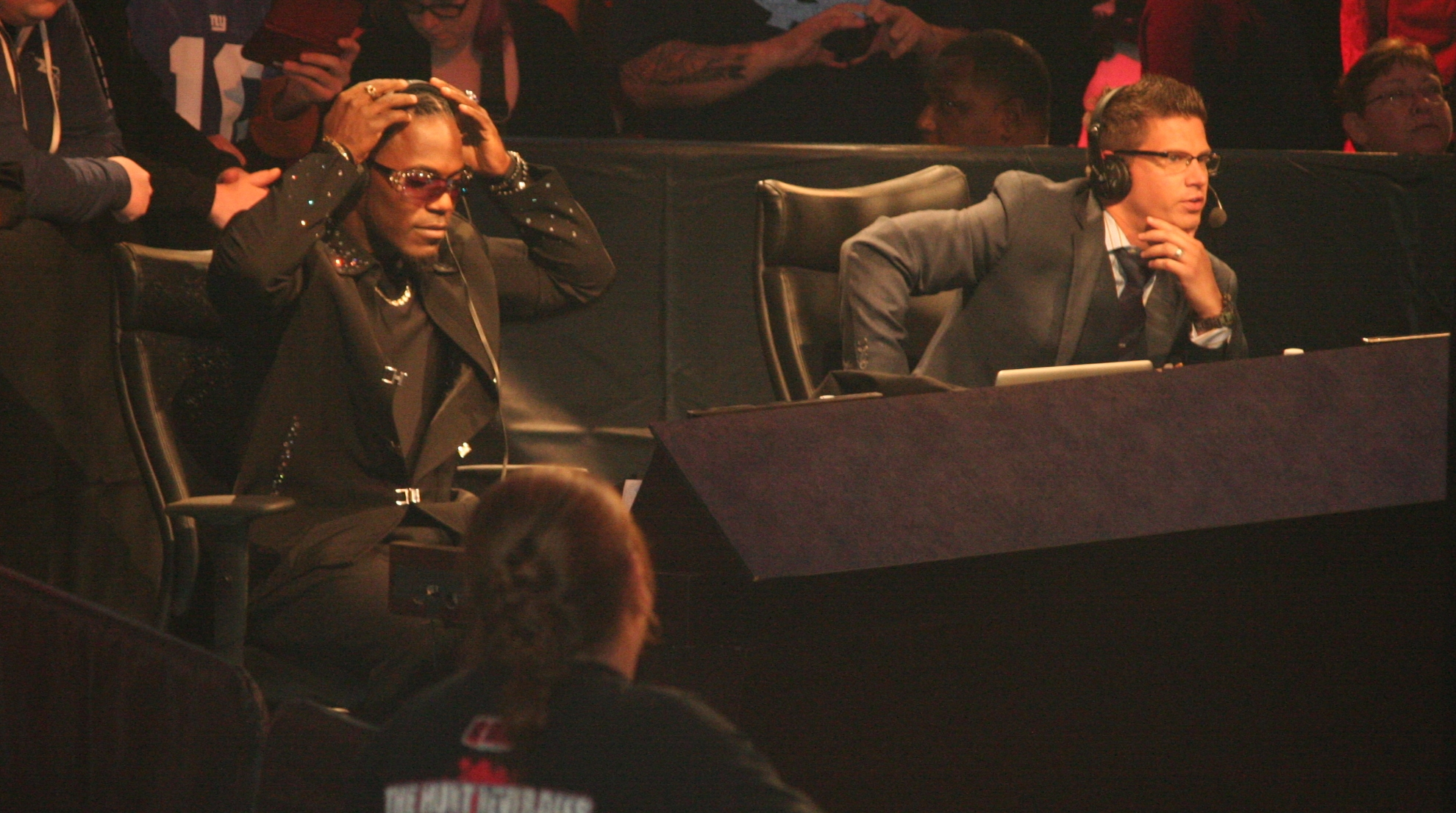
Pope (left) commentating with Josh Mathews in October 2015

Burke returned to TNA on the June 3, 2015 episode of Impact Wrestling alongside Josh Mathews on commentary under the ring name Da Pope. On October 4, 2015, at Bound For Glory, Pope entered in a twelve-man Bound For Gold Gauntlet match which was won by Tyrus.

On the March 15 episode of Impact Wrestling, Pope saved Josh Mathews from an attack by Lashley only to be attacked himself. The following week, Pope cost Lashley a shot at the TNA World Heavyweight Championship when he interfered in a gauntlet match he was competing in and then fighting him to the backstage area. On the April 5 episode of Impact Wrestling, Pope was defeated by Lashley in a street fight. He was acting as a face commentator.

On August 16, 2017, Dinero announced his departure from TNA.

=== Return to the independent circuit (2017) ===
Since leaving TNA, he has primarily wrestled for Fighting Evolution Wrestling, a Florida-based promotion.

=== National Wrestling Alliance (2019–2020) ===
Burke debuted in the National Wrestling Alliance (NWA) on the December 23, 2019, episode of NWA Powerrr, using his "Pope" moniker. On October 20, 2020, on UWN Primetime Live, Burke defeated Zicky Dice to win the NWA World Television Championship.

== Other media ==
Burke was a guest on Sci-Fi Channel's Ghost Hunters, on the October 31, 2007 Halloween live special episode. He would become the second WWE wrestler to appear on Ghost Hunters, with the first being CM Punk. He also had a journal on WWE.com called The Elijah Experience, where he discussed the happenings on ECW on Sci-Fi.

Burke is a playable character in the video games WWE SmackDown vs Raw 2008 and WWE SmackDown vs Raw 2009.

== Personal life ==
In May 2011, it was announced on his official website that Burke had graduated and received his degree with high honors in criminal justice.

Although Burke has not been in WWE for over ten years, Burke is close friends with Xavier Woods and the rest of The New Day, and appeared on an episode of Woods' YouTube channel UpUpDownDown in January 2019 playing Madden 19.

== Championships and accomplishments ==
- All Caribbean Wrestling
  - ACW Heavyweight Championship (1 times, current)
- Atomic Legacy Wrestling
  - ALW Next Level Championship (1 time)
  - ALW Rapid Fire Championship (1 time)
- Baltimore Championship Wrestling
  - BCW Heavyweight Championship (1 time)
- Combat Revolution Wrestling
  - CRW Tag Team Championship (1 time) – with Jeremy Prophet
- Fighting Evolution Wrestling
  - FEW North Heavyweight Championship (1 time)
  - FEW International Championship (1 time)
  - FEW Tag Team Championship (1 time) – with JB Cool
- National Wrestling Alliance
  - NWA World Television Championship (1 time)
- Ohio Valley Wrestling
  - OVW Heavyweight Championship (1 time)
  - OVW Television Championship (1 time)
  - OVW Southern Tag Team Championship (2 times) – with Private Anthony (1) and Big Jon (1)
  - Sixteenth OVW Triple Crown Champion
- Pro Wrestling Illustrated
  - Most Improved Wrestler of the Year (2010)
  - PWI ranked him No. 36 of the top 500 singles wrestlers in the PWI 500 in 2010
- Total Nonstop Action Wrestling
  - 8 Card Stud Tournament (2010)
