= One Night Stand (2007) =

World Wrestling Entertainment pay-per-view event

- Promotional poster featuring Bobby Lashley
- Promotion: World Wrestling Entertainment
- Brand(s): Raw; SmackDown! ECW
- Date: June 3, 2007
- City: Jacksonville, Florida
- Venue: Jacksonville Veterans Memorial Arena
- Attendance: 7,000
- Buy rate: 188,000
- Tagline: Extreme Rules

Pay-per-view chronology
← Previous; Judgment Day	Next → Vengeance: Night of Champions

One Night Stand chronology
← Previous; 2006	Next → 2008

The 2007 One Night Stand, also promoted as One Night Stand: Extreme Rules, was a professional wrestling pay-per-view (PPV) event produced by World Wrestling Entertainment (WWE). It was the third annual One Night Stand and took place on June 3, 2007, at the Jacksonville Veterans Memorial Arena in Jacksonville, Florida, held for wrestlers from the promotion's Raw, SmackDown!, and ECW brand divisions. The theme of the event was that it featured hardcore-based matches. While the previous two years's events were held primarily as reunion shows for Extreme Championship Wrestling (ECW) alumni, the 2007 event was promoted as a WWE event with wrestlers from all three brands participating as following WrestleMania 23 in April, brand-exclusive PPVs were discontinued.

The main match on the Raw brand was John Cena versus The Great Khali in a Pinfalls Count Anywhere match for the WWE Championship. Cena won the match and retained the WWE Championship after pinning Khali following an FU off a crane onto the arena floor. The featured match on the SmackDown! brand was Edge versus Batista in a Steel Cage match for the World Heavyweight Championship, which Edge won after escaping the cage.

The primary match on the ECW brand was Vince McMahon versus Bobby Lashley in a Street Fight for the ECW World Championship, which Lashley won by pinfall after performing a spear. The featured matches on the undercard included Rob Van Dam versus Randy Orton in a Stretcher match and a Ladder match for the World Tag Team Championship between The Hardys (Jeff Hardy and Matt Hardy) and The World's Greatest Tag Team (Shelton Benjamin and Charlie Haas).

== Production ==
=== Background ===
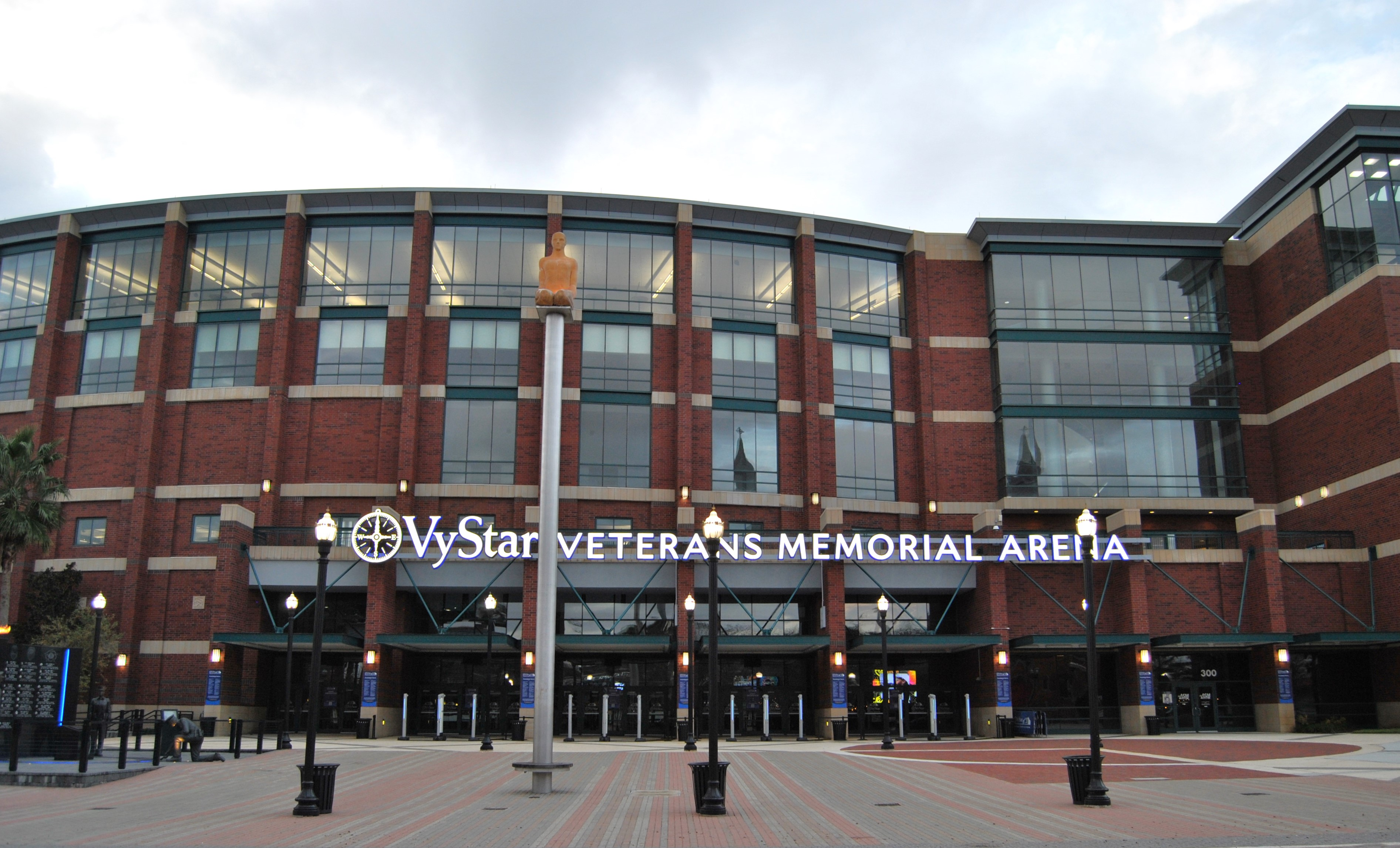
The third annual One Night Stand was held at the Jacksonville Veterans Memorial Arena in Jacksonville, Florida.

In the Junes of 2005 and 2006, World Wrestling Entertainment (WWE) held a professional wrestling pay-per-view (PPV) event titled ECW One Night Stand. Both years's events were produced primarily as reunion shows for wrestlers from the former Extreme Championship Wrestling (ECW) promotion and featured hardcore-based matches. Although they were held as reunion shows, wrestlers from WWE's Raw and SmackDown! brands also appeared, and in May 2006, WWE established a third brand dubbed ECW for alumni of the former promotion as well as newer talent.

Following the discontinuation of brand-exclusive PPVs after WrestleMania 23 in April, WWE scheduled a third One Night Stand for June 3, 2007, at the Jacksonville Veterans Memorial Arena in Jacksonville, Florida. It was promoted as a WWE event (dropping "ECW" from the event's name) and featured wrestlers from all three brands. Although no longer promoted as an ECW reunion show, it still continued the theme of featuring hardcore-based matches.

=== Storylines ===
The main feud heading into the event on the Raw brand was between WWE Champion John Cena and The Great Khali. This was a rematch of their encounter at Judgment Day, where Cena defeated Khali by forcing him to submit to the STFU. When Khali submitted to the STFU, however, his feet were underneath the bottom rope, meaning Cena should have broken the submission hold. Referee Mike Chioda was focusing on Khali's arm and did not see Khali's feet underneath the bottom rope. The following night on Raw, believing he should not have lost the match, Khali challenged Cena to a Falls Count Anywhere match. After Cena's acceptance, Khali Chokeslammed Cena. Heading into One Night Stand, Khali Chokebombed Cena again to win a non-title match against Cena on the June 2 episode of Saturday Night's Main Event XXXIV.

The predominant feud on the SmackDown! brand heading into the pay-per-view was between Edge and Batista, with the two battling over the World Heavyweight Championship. The two fought each other at Judgment Day for the title, and Edge won the bout with a school boy pin. On the May 25 episode of SmackDown!, General manager Theodore Long announced that Edge would defend the World Heavyweight Championship in a Steel Cage match at One Night Stand. Batista won a fatal four-way match against Finlay, Kane, and Mark Henry to face Edge at the pay-per-view. Batista was a guest on Edge's talk show The Cutting Edge on the June 1 episode of SmackDown!. Towards the end of the segment, Batista punched Edge and sent him to the floor. The following night, on Saturday Night's Main Event XXXIV, Batista and Chris Benoit defeated Edge and Montel Vontavious Porter (MVP) in a tag team match. During the match, Edge walked out, leaving MVP on his own against Batista and Benoit. Benoit gained the pinfall after performing a flying headbutt on MVP.

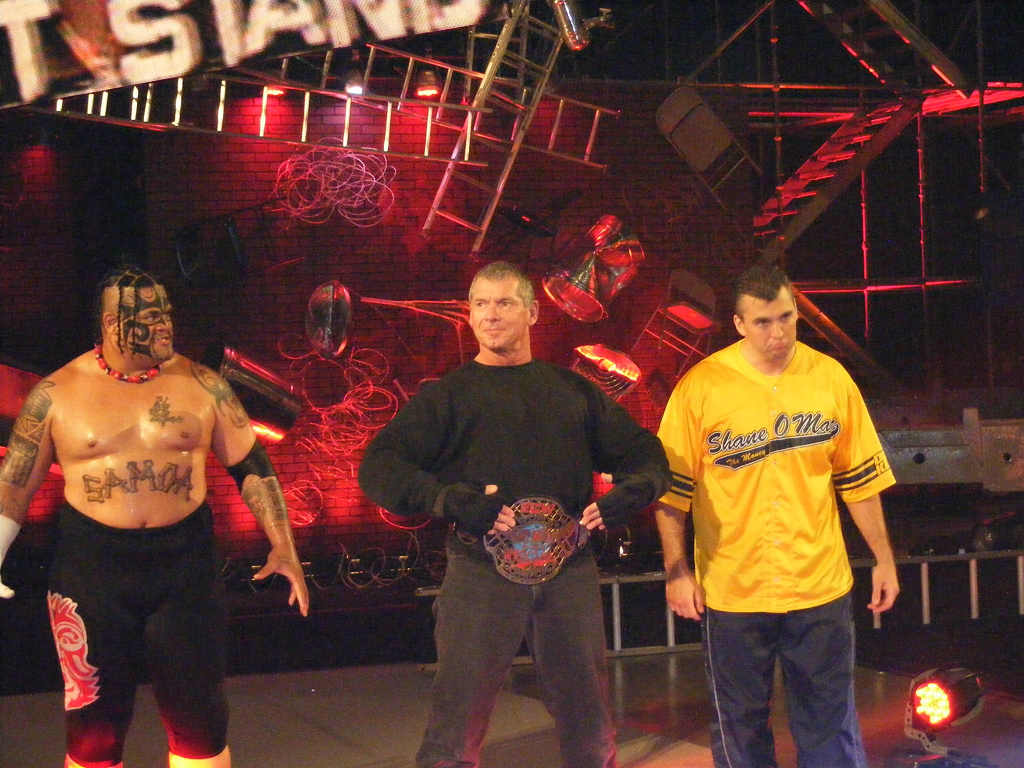
Umaga, ECW World Champion Vince McMahon, and Shane McMahon making their way to the ring

The other primary feud featured on the One Night Stand card consisted of both Raw and ECW superstars. ECW's Bobby Lashley battled Raw's Vince McMahon for the ECW World Championship. Lashley faced Team McMahon (ECW World Champion Vince McMahon, Shane, and Umaga) in a 3-on-1 tag team Handicap match at Judgment Day, with the ECW World Championship on the line. Lashley won the match, pinning Shane after a Dominator powerslam. After the match, however, Vince declared that Lashley had not won the title and that he was still the ECW World Champion, as he had not been pinned. In the match, Lashley could have won the title, but not a member of Team McMahon. The following night, on the May 21 episode of Raw, Lashley was put into a gauntlet match by Vince McMahon, with the stipulation that if he won all four of the matches in the gauntlet, he would face Vince at One Night Stand. Lashley won all four matches, defeating Chris Masters, Viscera, Umaga, and Shane McMahon in succession. As a result, Lashley gained a title shot at One Night Stand in a Street Fight. On the May 28 episode, Lashley teamed with WWE Champion John Cena to take on Umaga, Shane McMahon and The Great Khali in a Handicap match. Shane won the match, pinning Lashley after an elbow drop. Vince was scheduled to face Lashley in an arm wrestling contest on the June 2 episode of Saturday Night's Main Event XXXIV. Moments before the contest began, however, Vince booked Mark Henry as Lashley's opponent instead. During the contest, Vince attacked Lashley, hitting him with a steel chair.

== Event ==
Other on-screen personnel
Role:	Name:
English commentators	Jim Ross (Raw)
English commentators	Jerry Lawler (Raw)
English commentators	Michael Cole (SmackDown!)
English commentators	John "Bradshaw" Layfield (SmackDown!)
English commentators	Joey Styles (ECW)
English commentators	Tazz (ECW)
Spanish commentators	Carlos Cabrera
Spanish commentators	Hugo Savinovich
Interviewers	Todd Grisham
Interviewers	Maria Kanellis
Ring announcers	Justin Roberts (Raw/ECW)
Ring announcers	Tony Chimel (SmackDown!)
Referees	Charles Robinson
Referees	Mike Chioda
Referees	Mike Posey
Referees	John Cone
Referees	Mickie Henson
Referees	Marty Elias
Referees	Scott Armstrong
Referees	Jim Korderas

Before the event went live on pay-per-view, Santino Marella defeated Chris Masters in a dark match.

=== Preliminary matches ===
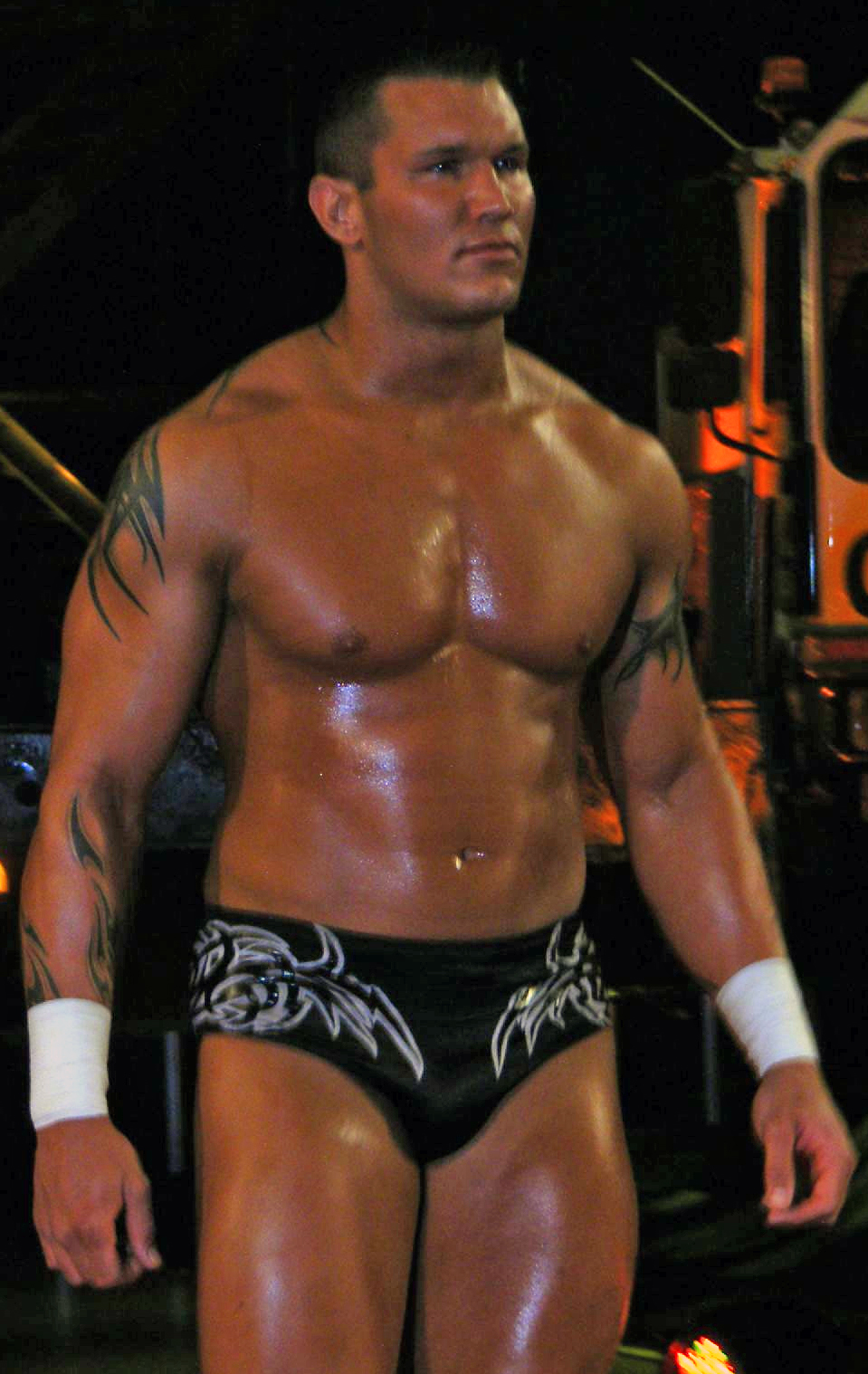
Randy Orton, who faced Rob Van Dam in a Stretcher match

The first match that aired was a stretcher match between Randy Orton and Rob Van Dam. The match went back and forth before Van Dam attempted to perform a Somersault Plancha onto Orton, but Orton moved out of the way. Orton put Van Dam on the stretcher and tried to wheel him across the finishing line. Van Dam, however, managed to kick Orton in the head and put him onto the stretcher. Van Dam wheeled the stretcher over the line for the win. After the match, Orton attacked Van Dam, executing an Elevated DDT off the barricade onto the arena floor. Van Dam was then carried out of the arena on the stretcher.

The next match was CM Punk and The ECW Originals (Tommy Dreamer and The Sandman) against the New Breed (Elijah Burke, Matt Striker, and Marcus Cor Von) in a tables match. Towards the end, Cor Von looked to Alpha Bomb Punk through a table, but Sandman hit Cor Von with a Singapore cane. With Burke on the table, Punk suplexed Striker off the top rope and through the table and Burke to win.

The third match was The Hardys (Matt Hardy and Jeff Hardy) against The World's Greatest Tag Team (Shelton Benjamin and Charlie Haas) in a ladder match for the World Tag Team Championship. The Hardys had the advantage for most of the match, but as Jeff was climbing the ladder to try and grab the belts, Benjamin botched a springboard attempt. Benjamin kicked the ladder from underneath Jeff, however, to gain control. The Hardys regained the advantage by pushing the ladder as The World's Greatest Tag Team were climbing it, causing Benjamin to fall to the floor. Jeff Swanton bombed Haas as Matt climbed the ladder to get the belts and win.

Next on the card was Mark Henry versus Kane in a lumberjack match with 12 lumberjacks at ringside; Chris Benoit, Val Venis, Santino Marella, Balls Mahoney, Stevie Richards, The Miz, Kevin Thorn, Chris Masters, Johnny Nitro, Chavo Guerrero, Kenny Dykstra, and Carlito. Kane chokeslamed Henry towards the end of the contest and attempted to pin Henry. Chavo Guerrero and Kenny Dykstra interfered, however, and attacked Kane. Kane fought back and chokeslammed Dykstra, but Henry locked Kane in a bear hug. The referee stopped the contest after Kane (kayfabe) passed out.

=== Main event matches ===
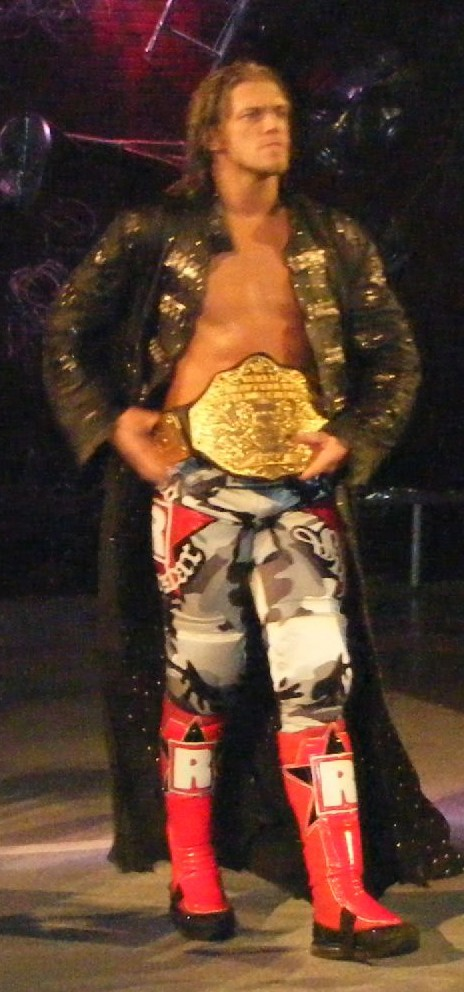
Edge entering as SmackDown!'s World Heavyweight Champion

The next match was Vince McMahon (accompanied by Shane McMahon and Umaga) against Bobby Lashley in a Street Fight for the ECW World Championship. Shane and Umaga interfered in the match, helping Vince gain the advantage. Shane performed a flying elbow drop, sending Lashley through the announce table at ringside. Back inside the ring, as Umaga was holding a trash can in front of Lashley's face in the corner, Shane attempted to execute the Coast-to-Coast dropkick; however, Lashley moved away, and Shane dropkicked the trash can into Umaga's face. Team McMahon kept the upper hand, as Umaga performed a Samoan Drop onto Lashley, which was followed by a spear from Vince. Lashley, however, gained the upper hand by hitting Vince several times with a steel chair. Lashley performed a spear on Shane and followed with a spear to Vince before pinning Vince to gain the victory and become the new ECW World Champion.

A Pudding match was next, as Candice Michelle faced WWE Women's Champion Melina (in a non-title match). Candice forced Melina to submit by holding her head under the pudding.

The next match was Edge against Batista in a Steel Cage match for the World Heavyweight Championship, which could be won by pinfall, submission, or escaping the cage. During the first few minutes of the contest, Edge attempted to escape the cage many times but Batista stopped him and gained the advantage after a suplex to Edge off the top rope. Edge gained the upper hand late in the contest, performing a spear to Batista, but didn't get the pinfall. Batista regained the advantage and attempted the Batista Bomb, but Edge reversed the move. Edge climbed over the top of the cage while Batista crawled towards the door. Edge's feet hit the arena floor first, and he was declared the winner and retained his title.

The main event was a Falls Count Anywhere match for the WWE Championship, as John Cena defended against The Great Khali. Khali had control for most of the contest, performing a spin kick and a leg drop onto Cena. The contest went into the crowd, as Khali hit Cena with a television monitor. Cena gained the advantage, swinging the boom camera by the crew set into Khali. Cena attempted to perform the FU, but Khali blocked it with his elbow. Khali regained the upper hand, scoop slamming Cena onto a crane. Cena fought back while on the crane and performed an FU to Khali off the crane onto the arena floor. Cena got the pinfall and the victory.

== Aftermath ==
A storyline involving Vince McMahon's "death" began the following night on Raw. He appeared traumatized from losing the ECW World Championship, acting strangely as a result. This behavior continued in McMahon's appearances on all brands and culminated in a segment on the June 11 episode of Raw with McMahon entering a limousine moments before it exploded. However, this storyline was scrapped when ECW wrestler Chris Benoit murdered his wife and youngest son over the weekend of June 22–24.

The WWE Draft also took place on Raw and resulted in The Great Khali being drafted to SmackDown!, thus ending his feud with John Cena. Bobby Lashley was drafted to Raw and was forced to relinquish his ECW World Championship. Lashley, along with King Booker, Randy Orton, and Mick Foley, entered a feud with John Cena. On the June 18 episode of Raw, all men began cutting promos on how they deserved to be the number one contender to the WWE Championship, and the title match was scheduled for Vengeance: Night of Champions.

On the June 8 episode of SmackDown!, Vince McMahon announced that Edge would be defending the World Heavyweight Championship against Batista in a Last Chance match at Vengeance: Night of Champions. On the June 22 episode of SmackDown!, Batista and Ric Flair defeated Edge and Montel Vontavious Porter (MVP). Midway through the match, Flair and MVP brawled outside the ring, leaving Edge on his own against Batista. Batista gained the pinfall after hitting Edge with a Batista Bomb.

As part of the WWE Draft, Chris Benoit was drafted from SmackDown! to ECW. In his debut on the ECW brand, Benoit teamed up with CM Punk in a tag team match against Elijah Burke and Marcus Cor Von, in which Benoit and Punk won. On the June 19 episode of ECW, two qualifying matches were held in which they would determine the opponents for Vengeance for the vacant ECW World Championship. The first qualifying match saw Benoit defeat Elijah Burke by submission and thus for advancing to the Vengeance finals. That same night, CM Punk went on to defeat Marcus Cor Von to advanced to the finals. At Vengeance, Benoit was replaced by Johnny Nitro, after he withdrew from the match for "personal reasons". It would be discovered a few days later that Benoit murdered his wife and son before committing suicide. Nitro defeated Punk to win the ECW World Championship.

This was the final One Night Stand to air in 4:3 format until January 2008 when it went to high definition.

== Results ==
No.	Results	Stipulations	Times
1^{D}	Santino Marella defeated Chris Masters by pinfall	Singles match	04:13
2	Rob Van Dam defeated Randy Orton	Stretcher match	14:31
3	CM Punk and The ECW Originals (The Sandman and Tommy Dreamer) defeated The New Breed (Elijah Burke, Matt Striker, and Marcus Cor Von)	Six-man tag team tables match	07:18
4	The Hardys (Jeff Hardy and Matt Hardy) (c) defeated The World's Greatest Tag Team (Charlie Haas and Shelton Benjamin)	Ladder match for the World Tag Team Championship	17:25
5	Mark Henry defeated Kane by technical submission	Lumberjack match (Note: The lumberjacks were: Balls Mahoney, Carlito, Chavo Guerrero, Chris Benoit, Chris Masters, Johnny Nitro, Kenny Dykstra, Kevin Thorn, The Miz, Santino Marella, Stevie Richards, and Val Venis.)	09:07
6	Bobby Lashley defeated Mr. McMahon (c) (with Shane McMahon and Umaga) by pinfall	Street Fight for the ECW World Championship	12:23
7	Candice Michelle defeated Melina by submission	Pudding match	02:55
8	Edge (c) defeated Batista by escaping the cage	Steel Cage match for the World Heavyweight Championship	15:39
9	John Cena (c) defeated The Great Khali by pinfall	Falls Count Anywhere match for the WWE Championship	10:30
(c) / – the champion(s) heading into the match; D / – this was a dark match
