= ECW Originals =

Professional wrestling stable

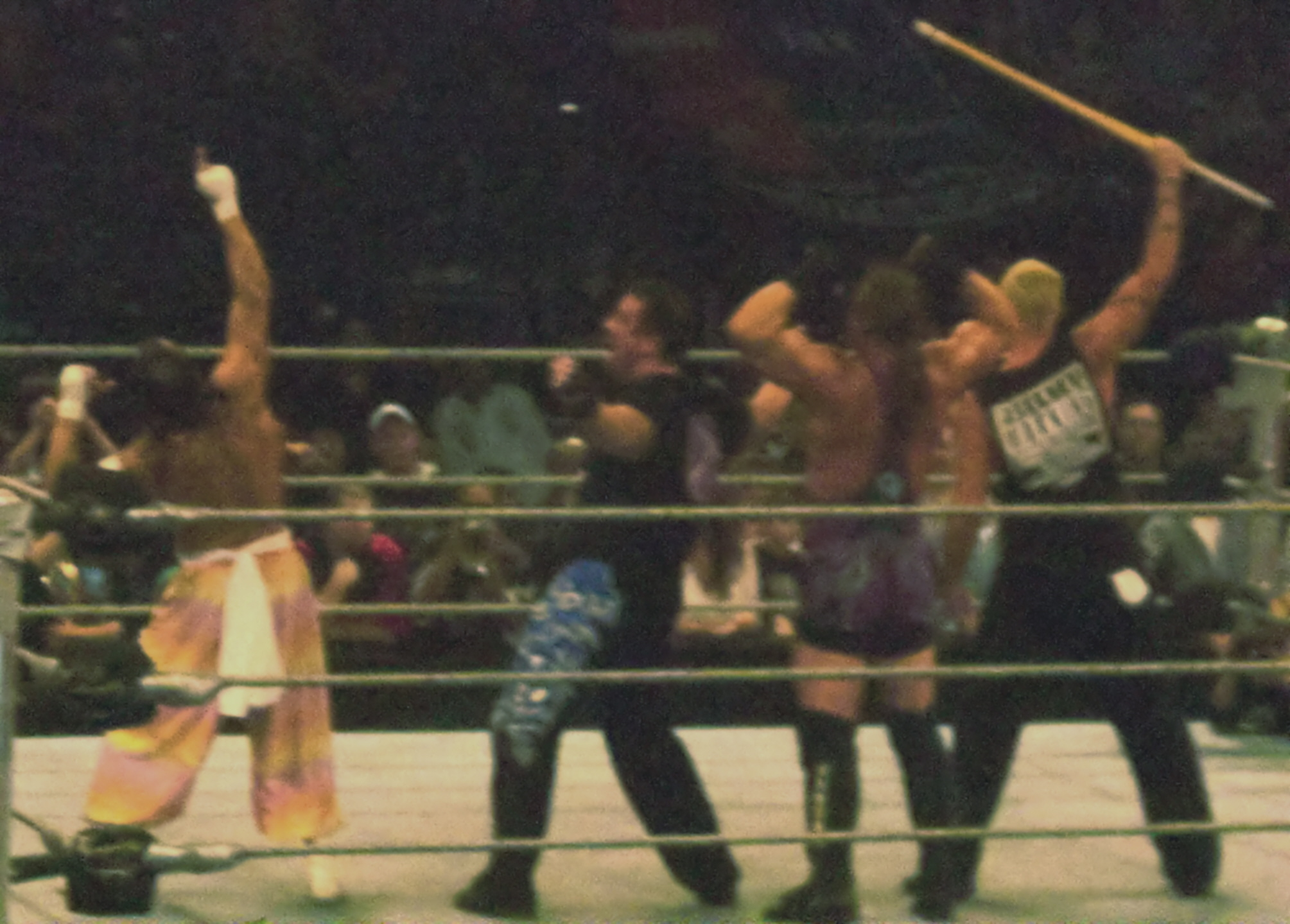
- The ECW Originals (from left to right: Sabu, Dreamer, RVD and Sandman) in 2007

Stable
- Members: See below
- Name(s): The ECW Originals (WWE); EV 2.0 (TNA)
- Debut: June 5, 2006
- Disbanded: 2022
- Years active: 2006–2007; 2010–2011; 2015–2016; 2022

The ECW Originals was a professional wrestling stable that made appearances in various wrestling promotions, such as World Wrestling Entertainment (WWE) and Total Nonstop Action Wrestling (TNA).

The name of the stable derives from their affiliation with the original independent Extreme Championship Wrestling (ECW) promotion, with "ECW Originals" being wrestlers who first came to prominence during the first ECW's run. Members of the ECW Originals faction have held the ECW World Heavyweight Championship, World Television Championship, or World Tag Team Championship during their tenure with the original company.

In 2006, WWE relaunched ECW as their third brand, with wrestlers from the original promotions being dubbed the ECW Originals and feuding with wrestlers with no association with the original ECW, dubbed "The New Breed".

In July 2010, the group debuted in TNA under the name EV 2.0 (EV being an abbreviation for "Extreme Violence" or "Extreme Version"). However, the ECW Originals reunion was only implied and never billed under that name, due to WWE owning all ECW trademarks and properties.

== History ==
=== World Wrestling Entertainment / WWE ===
==== Feud with The New Breed (2006) ====
When World Wrestling Entertainment (WWE) revived ECW as a third brand, they did so by having a number of wrestlers from the original promotion appear on the June 5, 2006 Raw to attack WWE Champion John Cena. From there, the new ECW was given its own weekly show, with the tagline "A New Breed Unleashed" appearing in TV advertising, on the Sci Fi Channel.

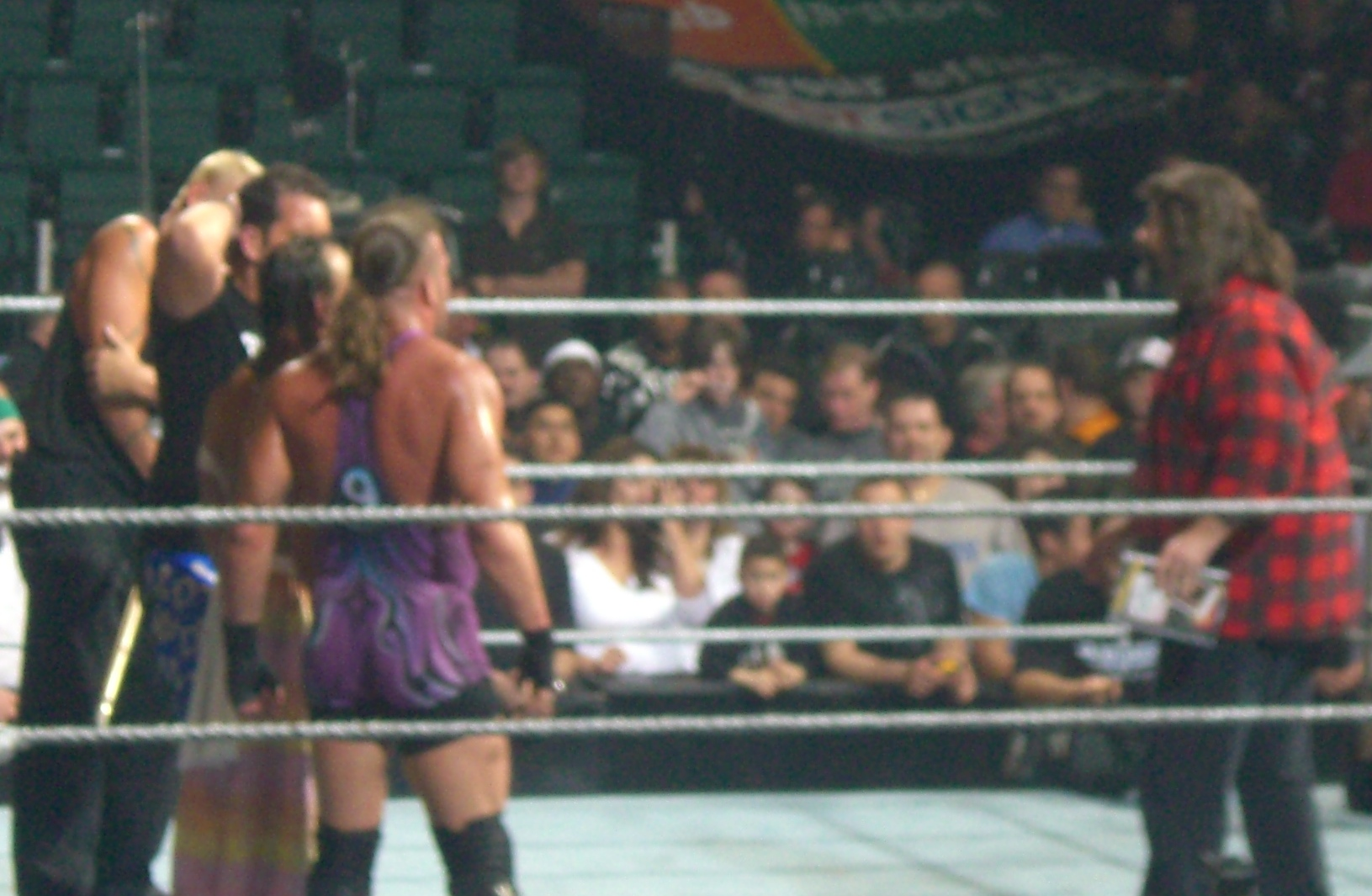
The ECW Originals with Mick Foley

One of the first feuds on the brand pitted Mike Knox and Test against The Sandman and Tommy Dreamer.

On January 30, 2007, when Vince McMahon appeared on ECW on Sci Fi to, in storyline, take a more hands-on role in running the brand, he started by taking stock of the roster. In doing so he degraded the "ECW Originals", he ran into backstage while calling newcomers the "New Breed". He lavished praise on Elijah Burke at the end of the night, prompting Dreamer, Sabu, Balls Mahoney, and The Sandman to rush to the ring and attack Burke, leaving him lying in the ring as they taunted McMahon.

Over the next weeks, the war continued with Burke and a number of other "new" stars becoming "the New Breed" and promptly starting a feud with the Originals, who lost Balls Mahoney but were joined by Rob Van Dam (Mahoney was still an active performer and still recognised as a member of the stable, however, he would never become involved in any match related to the stable). The New Breed got off to a hot start in the feud, picking up win after win with no ECW Originals pinning New Breed members until three weeks into the feud, when Rob Van Dam pinned Kevin Thorn. The teams continued to clash in singles and tag matches, trading wins on the weekly ECW show. The Originals won a standard-rules four-on-four match at WrestleMania 23, but lost an extreme-rules rematch on the next Tuesday's show.

CM Punk had been brought into the storyline as a coveted free agent, with both the Originals and the New Breed attempting to recruit him. Punk made it clear to both sides that he was not interested. Members of both stables would interfere in Punk's matches, with the ECW Originals costing him multiple wins. On the April 10 episode of ECW, after a match between Van Dam and Burke, Punk came down to ringside, looking like he was about to check on Sabu. Instead, however, he shook hands with Burke and the rest of the New Breed, showing his allegiance to them. Over the next few weeks, Punk showed his loyalty to the members of the New Breed, playing the role of a valet instead of an actual team member. While he openly supported Cor Von, Thorn and Stryker, he openly disrespected Burke, constantly questioning Burke's ability to lead the stable or win matches alone. A few weeks after joining, however, Punk turned on the New Breed, and joined the Originals to defeat them in an 8-man elimination tag team match. This marked the end of the feud as the New Breed started to fall apart during a feud which saw all four members target Punk exclusively (and unsuccessfully).

With the common enemy defeated, the ECW Originals seemed to have quietly disbanded, with all members concentrating on their singles careers. Following Mr. McMahon winning the ECW World Championship at Backlash, the Originals were shown to still be a stable when McMahon teased them with the title. The quartet later made comments about Vince McMahon becoming the new ECW Champion and killing the ECW spirit on WWE's official website. (Mr. McMahon won the title while teaming with Shane McMahon and Umaga, and every title defence saw the trio compete as a team, however, Mr. McMahon is the only one recognised as the title holder). This led to an "Extreme Rules" Four Way Dance between the Originals, with the winner getting a chance to face Mr. McMahon for the ECW World Championship. Van Dam won this match with a Five-Star Frog splash to Sandman, but it was later announced that his championship match would be a three-on-one handicap match with Mr. McMahon, his son Shane McMahon and Umaga, which Van Dam lost.

==== Split (2007) ====
On May 15, 2007, Sabu was released by the WWE.

At One Night Stand, Dreamer and Sandman teamed up with CM Punk to defeat the remaining New Breed members in a Tables Match. The same night, Van Dam was involved in a match versus Randy Orton and, in storyline, suffered a concussion which removed him from television. This would be Van Dam's last match under a WWE contract. On June 5, 2007, Bobby Lashley defeated another ECW Originals incarnation of Tommy Dreamer, Balls Mahoney and Sandman in a 3-on-1 handicap hardcore match.

The stable was fractured even further when Sandman was drafted to Raw on June 17, 2007, and released on September 11, 2007. In mid-2007, Stevie Richards teamed with Tommy Dreamer against the New Breed on house shows, replacing Sandman in the ECW Originals. As commentating teams announced Elijah Burke as the "former" leader of the New Breed, it signaled the end of the New Breed and the ECW Originals, and their feud.

After the releases of Rob Van Dam in June 2007, Balls Mahoney in April 2008 and Stevie Richards in August 2008, Dreamer was the last remaining member of ECW Originals in WWE, until his release was announced in January 2010, ending the ECW Original blood line. Eventually, ECW was cancelled on February 16, 2010, and replaced with NXT. However, Rob Van Dam would return to the company for a short time in early 2013, at the 2013 WWE Hall of Fame induction ceremony, and competed at Money in the Bank on July 14, 2013.

==== Return (2015–2016) ====
On November 30, 2015, The Dudley Boyz – who had been feuding with The Wyatt Family – brought back Tommy Dreamer on Raw, establishing a new incarnation of the ECW Originals.

On December 2, 2015, the group introduced the returning Rhyno on Raw to help in their feud with the Wyatts. On December 13 in the TLC pay per view, the ECW Originals lost to the Wyatt Family in an 8-man tables elimination match, and again the next night on Raw in an Extreme Rules match. The group disappeared from WWE TV by 2016. On April 12, 2016, Balls Mahoney, an ECW Originals member, died.

=== Total Nonstop Action Wrestling / Impact Wrestling ===
==== Debut and EV 2.0 (2010–2011) ====
On the July 15, 2010, edition of Total Nonstop Action Wrestling's Impact! television show, former ECW wrestlers Rob Van Dam, Tommy Dreamer, Mick Foley, Raven, Stevie Richards, Rhino, Brother Devon, Pat Kenney and Al Snow came together to form the stable "EV 2.0" and assaulted the TNA locker room. Though TNA is legally prohibited from using the ECW name due to WWE's ownership, the association was indirectly referenced. The following week, TNA president Dixie Carter agreed to give the ECW alumni their own reunion pay–per–view event, Hardcore Justice, which took place on August 8, 2010. On the following edition of Impact!, Rob Van Dam, Tommy Dreamer, Team 3D, Mick Foley, Sandman, Sabu, Bill Alfonso, Rhino, Raven, Stevie Richards, Guido Maritato and Tony Luke were assaulted by Abyss and A.J. Styles, Kazarian, Beer Money, Inc. (Robert Roode, James Storm), Douglas Williams, and Matt Morgan of Ric Flair's Fourtune stable, who thought the "hardcore originals" did not deserve to be in TNA. The following week TNA president Dixie Carter gave the ECW alumni TNA contracts in order for them to settle their score with Fourtune, united as a group under the name "EV 2.0". Team 3D's contracts with TNA expired shortly thereafter and they have made no more appearances as members of EV 2, nor has Bill Alfonso or Sandman, who no-showed an Impact! taping on August 23. Guido Maritato and Tony Luke made their final appearance for TNA on the August 26 edition of Impact!, in a squash match, where they were defeated by Beer Money, Inc. On the September 2 edition of Impact! EV 2 was joined by Brian Kendrick, making him the first TNA member of the group with no past with Extreme Championship Wrestling. At No Surrender EV 2.0 lost all three of their matches, when Sabu unsuccessfully challenged Douglas Williams for the TNA X Division Championship, Rhino lost to Abyss in a Falls Count Anywhere match and Dreamer was defeated by A.J. Styles in an "I Quit" match. On the following edition of Impact!, Dreamer appeared on the Impact! Zone alone, admitted EV 2.0's defeat and attempted to reach a truce with Fourtune, but was beaten down. The following week he returned with Raven, Stevie Richards, Sabu and Rhino and announced that Dixie Carter had given the five of them a Lethal Lockdown match against Fourtune at Bound for Glory. Later that same night Sabu lost to A.J. Styles in a ladder match contested for the advantage at Bound for Glory. On the October 7 live edition of Impact! Mick Foley defeated Fourtune leader Ric Flair in a Last Man Standing match. At Bound for Glory Dreamer, Raven, Rhino, Richards and Sabu defeated Fourtune members Styles, Kazarian, Morgan, Roode and Storm in a Lethal Lockdown match.

On the October 21 edition of Impact! Eric Bischoff claimed that someone from EV 2.0 had been calling him, trying to get to be a part of his new Immortal stable. Rob Van Dam, whose friend Jeff Hardy had turned on him two weeks earlier to join Immortal, wanted to find out who had been talking to Bischoff and first accused Raven of being the one. Later, he and Sabu were defeated in a tag team match by Beer Money, Inc., after Sabu accidentally hit him with a chair. After the match Van Dam and Sabu began shoving each other and had to be separated from each other by the rest of EV 2.0. After two more weeks of dissension between Van Dam and the rest of EV 2.0, Tommy Dreamer challenged Van Dam to a match at Turning Point. At the pay–per–view Van Dam defeated Dreamer and afterwards made peace with him. Also at Turning Point, Brian Kendrick, Raven, Richards, Rhino and Sabu faced Fortune in a ten-man tag team match, where each member of EV 2.0 put their TNA careers on the line. Fortune won the match and afterwards Flair fired Sabu. His release from TNA was legitimate. On the following edition of Impact!, Rhino revealed himself as the traitor Bischoff had been talking about by costing Van Dam his match against Kazarian and afterwards hitting Dreamer with a chair. The following week Raven was forced to put his TNA future on the line in a match against the TNA World Heavyweight Champion Jeff Hardy. Hardy won the match and as a result Raven was released from TNA. His release from the company was also legitimate. On December 5 at Final Resolution Rhino wrestled his final match for the promotion, when he faced Van Dam in a First Blood match in a losing effort. The stable has not made an appearance since. On January 11, 2011, Stevie Richards announced that he had quit TNA.

==== Sporadic reunions (2022, 2023) ====
During the 2022 Bound for Glory event, Tommy Dreamer inducted Raven into the Impact Hall of Fame. Later during the event, Dreamer, Rhino, Johnny Swinger, and Bully Ray reunited, and were referred to by commentators as EV 2.0, during the Call Your Shot Gauntlet, with Ray winning the match by last eliminating Steve Maclin.

During Impact 1000, Impact Digital Media Champion Tommy Dreamer and Rhino reunited during a dark match, defeating The Most Professional Wrestling Gods (Brian Myers and Moose).

== Members ==
=== World Wrestling Entertainment / WWE ===
(as "The ECW Originals")

- Balls Mahoney
- Bubba Ray Dudley
- D-Von Dudley
- Rhyno
- Rob Van Dam
- Sabu
- The Sandman
- Stevie Richards
- Tommy Dreamer

=== Total Nonstop Action Wrestling / Impact Wrestling ===
(as "EV 2.0")

- Al Snow
- Bill Alfonso
- Brian Kendrick
- Brother Devon
- Brother Ray/Bully Ray
- Guido Maritato
- Johnny Swinger
- Mick Foley (co-leader)
- Pat Kenney/Simon Diamond
- Raven
- Rhino
- Rob Van Dam
- Sabu
- The Sandman
- Stevie Richards
- Taz
- Tommy Dreamer (co-leader)
- Tony Luke

== Championships and accomplishments ==
- Pro Wrestling Illustrated
  - Comeback of the Year (2010) – Rob Van Dam
- Total Nonstop Action Wrestling / Impact Wrestling
  - TNA World Heavyweight Championship (1 time) – Rob Van Dam
  - Impact Digital Media Championship (1 time) – Tommy Dreamer
  - Call Your Shot Gauntlet (2022) – Bully Ray
  - Impact Hall of Fame (2022) – Raven
  - TNA Hall of Fame (2024) – Rhino

== See also ==
- Extreme Championship Wrestling
- The New Breed
- List of Extreme Championship Wrestling alumni
- Sabu and Rob Van Dam
- The Alliance, a stable composed of WCW and ECW wrestlers
