= Shelly Martinez =

American professional wrestler and model

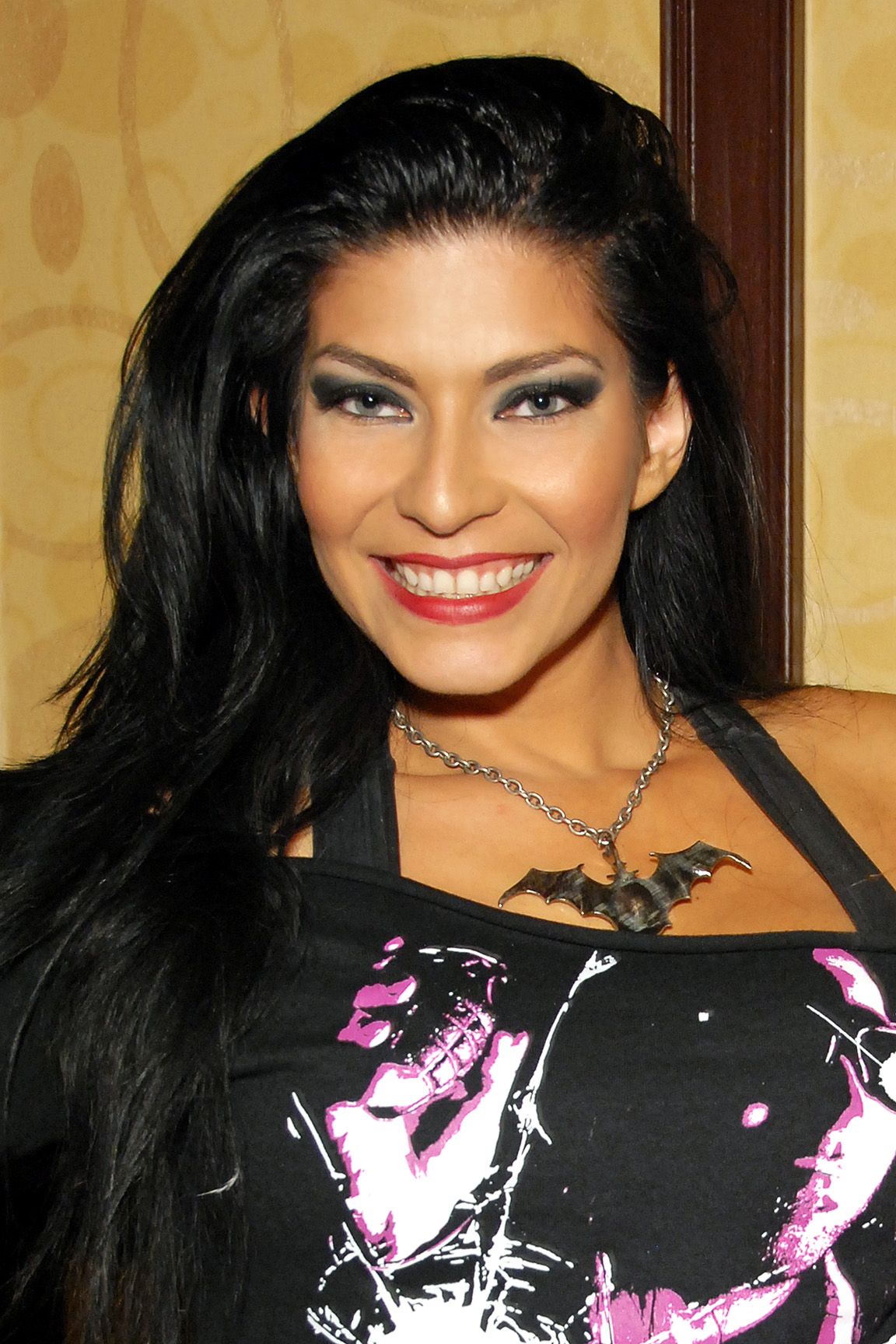
- Martinez in 2011

Personal information
- Born: Shelly Leonor Martinez; February 9, 1980 (age 46) Chino, California, U.S.

Professional wrestling career
- Ring name(s): Ariel; Cle-Ho-Patra; Desire; Halloween Barbie; Koffin Kitten; Salinas; Shelly; Shelly Martinez
- Billed height: 5 ft 4 in (1.63 m)
- Billed weight: 115 lb (52 kg)
- Billed from: Chino, California; The Jewel of the Nile
- Trained by: School of Hard Knocks; WPW Lucha Libre; Ultimate Pro Wrestling; Inoki Dojo; Ohio Valley Wrestling
- Debut: December 2000
- Retired: May 2017

Shelly Leonor Martinez (born February 9, 1980) is an American model, actress, retired professional wrestler and valet. She is known for her work with World Wrestling Entertainment (WWE) on its ECW brand under the ring name Ariel and for Total Nonstop Action Wrestling (TNA) under the ring name Salinas as valet to The Latin American Xchange (LAX).

Martinez entered professional wrestling in December 2000. She worked mainly on the independent circuit in Southern California, using the name Desire, competing for promotions including Revolution Pro Wrestling, Ultimate Pro Wrestling and the Empire Wrestling Federation (EWF). In April 2005, she signed a contract with WWE, and was assigned to their developmental territory, Ohio Valley Wrestling (OVW). She moved to the ECW brand in mid-2006, and using a gimmick of a tarot reader, managed Kevin Thorn, while known as Ariel. In 2007, she was released from her WWE contract, and signed with TNA. Known as Salinas, she was associated with LAX, and managed both members of the team, Homicide and Hernandez. She left TNA in September 2008, and appeared for several independent promotions until her retirement in 2017.

Martinez is also known for her acting and modeling work. She was a contestant on the reality television show, The Search for the Next Elvira, and has also appeared in films. She starred in The Notorious Jewel De'Nyle & Shelly Martinez, a softcore pornography video alongside Jewel De'Nyle, and has also posed nude on several occasions.

== Professional wrestling career ==
=== Early career (2000-2005) ===
Martinez began working as a model in order to further her professional wrestling career. She also worked as an actress, and after being cast in an independent film about wrestling, she was introduced to a wrestling promoter and trainer. She trained at his school for two and a half years. Martinez first wrestled in Southern California under the ring name Desire, appearing in several independent promotions such as Revolution Pro Wrestling, Empire Wrestling Federation (EWF) and Ultimate Pro Wrestling (UPW), where she worked as the storyline sister of Kyra. While in UPW, she also competed under the name Halloween Barbie. She also had a run in Women's Extreme Wrestling, where she played the storyline cousin of Mercedes Martinez. On July 19, 2002, Martinez, under the name Desire, teamed with Threat to win the vacant EWF Tag Team Championship in a battle royal. They held the championship for 28 days, before losing it to PHAT (Eric Matlock and Devon Willis) on August 16. In December 2004, Martinez trained at World Wrestling Entertainment (WWE)'s developmental territory, Ohio Valley Wrestling (OVW) for a few weeks.

=== World Wrestling Entertainment (2005-2007) ===
==== Ohio Valley Wrestling (2005–2007) ====
In April 2005, Martinez signed a developmental contract with WWE. By July of that year she had begun training and wrestling in their primary developmental territory OVW, using simply "Shelly" as a ring name. Her first role there had her, along with Beth Phoenix, acting as co-manager for Aaron Stevens. As part of her affiliation with Phoenix and Stevens, Shelly had an erotic gimmick, with a relationship between all three being implied. She was involved in a scripted rivalry with Alexis Laree, with Shelly and Phoenix attacking her on several occasions and the pair wrestled her in handicap matches. In her first singles match in OVW Shelly defeated Laree on October 29. Shelly and Phoenix also appeared together on the January 27, 2006, episode of Heat as part of The Heart Throbs (Romeo Roselli and Antonio Thomas) "Throb-o-Meter" section, dancing in the ring with the team and teasing a kiss, before being interrupted by Trevor Murdoch.

In February 2006, Shelly began a gimmick of being obsessed with Paul Burchill, who was using a pirate gimmick on SmackDown!. It began at the television tapings on February 1, when Burchill had picked her up to perform a piledriver, but instead carried her backstage after looking at her panties. This obsession provoked a feud with Phoenix, when Shelly attacked Phoenix who was attempting to stop Shelly from attacking Cherry during a match between Burchill and Deuce Shade. As part of the feud, Shelly and Phoenix competed against each other in several matches, including a street fight at the television tapings on April 19. On the May 6 episode of Velocity, Shelly appeared as Burchill's valet for his match against Road Warrior Animal, and was referred to as his "buxom wench". Returning to OVW, she became involved in Seth Skyfire's ongoing feud with Mike "The Miz" Mizanin and Roni Jonah. Upon her debut on the ECW brand in mid-2006, Martinez began using the ring name Ariel in OVW as well. In November 2006, Ariel unsuccessfully challenged Beth Phoenix for the OVW Women's Championship. Her final appearance in OVW came on January 25, 2007, when she and Jon Bolen defeated Stevens and Phoenix.

==== ECW (2006–2007) ====
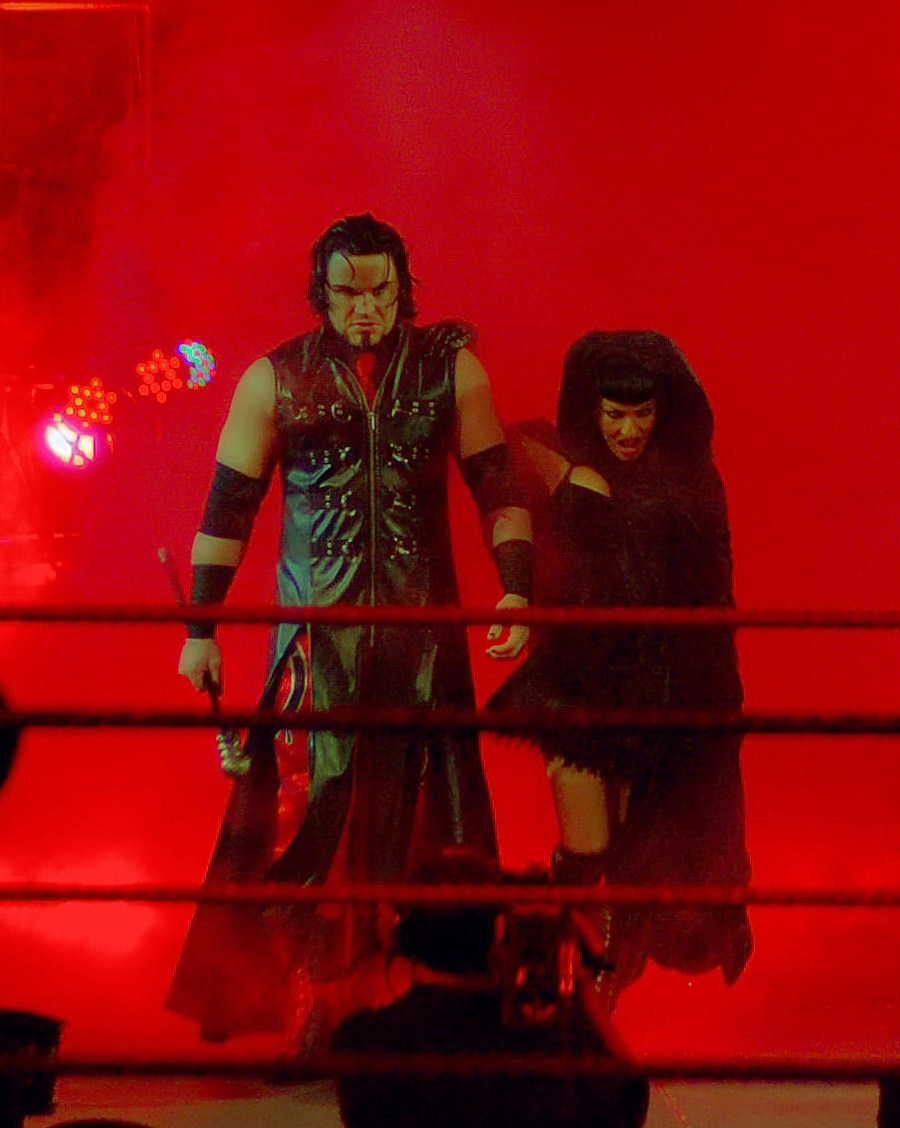
Ariel accompanying Kevin Thorn in WWE's version of ECW in 2006

In mid-2006, Martinez joined the ECW brand as Ariel, a tarot reading fortune teller. Originally, Martinez was to be part of a 'vampire' faction with Gangrel and Kevin Thorn; however, the faction did not materialise on television. Instead, Ariel and Thorn began appearing in vignettes together, and on July 25, Thorn made his in-ring debut with Ariel acting as his valet.

Ariel then increased her ringside presence during Thorn's matches, often interfering in his matches, and Thorn began a scripted feud with Balls Mahoney. In order to counteract Ariel's interference, Mahoney began bringing in Francine as an equalizer. Ariel made her ECW in-ring debut against Francine on September 26 in an "Extreme Catfight", which ended as a no contest due to interference from both Thorn and Mahoney. The two teams feuded until early October, until Francine was released by WWE. During a match between Thorn and CM Punk, Kelly Kelly interfered in order to help Punk. As a result, Punk won the match, and Ariel and Thorn attacked Kelly after the match. At the December to Dismember pay-per-view, Thorn and Ariel defeated Kelly and Kelly's on-screen boyfriend Mike Knox in a mixed tag team match, after Knox walked out on Kelly. The next week on ECW, Ariel lost to Kelly in a singles match, when Kelly utilized a schoolgirl for the victory.

On February 6, 2007, Ariel and Thorn joined Elijah Burke, Matt Striker, and Marcus Cor Von in forming The New Breed stable. Ariel began accompanying the New Breed to the ring during their matches, and appeared at WrestleMania 23, managing the New Breed during their match against the ECW Originals. Shortly afterward, Burke announced a match between Thorn and CM Punk, after Punk had betrayed the New Breed, but Thorn lost. After the match, Thorn quit the New Breed, as none of the other members interfered during the match to help him. A few weeks later, on May 18, 2007, Martinez was released from her WWE contract. In a 2013 interview, Shelly Martinez blamed her release on a confrontation with Dave Batista.

=== Total Nonstop Action Wrestling (2007–2008) ===
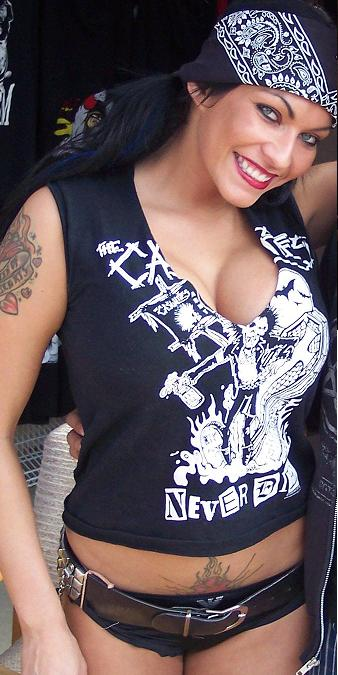
Martinez as Salinas in November 2007

At the Bound for Glory pay-per-view in October 2007, Martinez participated in a Knockout Gauntlet battle royal to crown the first TNA Knockout Champion, which was won by Gail Kim. Shortly afterward, a masked member of the Latin American Xchange (LAX) began interfering in LAX's matches to help them gain victories and attacking the Rock 'n Rave Infection's valet, Christy Hemme. At the Final Resolution pay-per-view in January 2008, the mystery masked wrestler was unveiled as Martinez after attacking Hemme again. On the following episode of Impact!, Homicide and Hernandez gave her the name "Salinas". Salinas then began accompanying Homicide and Hernandez to the ring as their valet.

She made her in-ring debut for TNA in a singles against Awesome Kong, and was quickly defeated. She then began competing more frequently in matches, including intergender tag team matches alongside Homicide and Hernandez. Salinas participated at Lockdown in the first ever "Queen of the Cage" match, which was won by Roxxi Laveaux. After a Knockouts "Makeover Battle Royal" was announced for the Sacrifice pay-per-view, where one Knockout would get their head shaved, Salinas competed in a match to gain immunity from the head shaving on the May 8 episode of Impact!, but was unsuccessful. At Sacrifice, the "Makeover Battle Royal" was won by Gail Kim, and Roxxi Laveaux had her head shaved. The same night, Salinas and Héctor Guerrero were in the corner of LAX as they won the TNA World Tag Team Championship. As part of LAX's feud with Beer Money, Inc., Salinas wrestled their manager Jackie Moore on Impact! in June 2008, but lost by submission. She participated in a gauntlet battle royal match for the number one contendership to the TNA Women's Knockout Championship, but was unsuccessful, and a few weeks later lost a three-on-one handicap match to Awesome Kong and The Beautiful People (Velvet Sky and Angelina Love). After Beer Money, Inc. won the TNA World Tag Team Championship from LAX, the two teams began feuding, and at No Surrender in September, Salinas was attacked off camera by their manager Jackie Moore. This storyline was put in place as a way to take Martinez off television, as she had quit TNA following being denied a pay rise. Martinez opted to leave and star in an Italian thriller movie.

=== Later career (2008–2017) ===
Martinez wrestled under her real name for the Perros del Mal promotion in Mexico. Martinez is part of both World Independent Ladies Division and World Wrestling Fan Xperience in the Philippines. Martinez has also appeared as a valet for Dragon Gate USA.

Beginning in 2010, Martinez began appearing for Championship Wrestling From Hollywood. She defeated Lucky O'Shea in her debut match for the promotion in August 2010. In 2013, she was briefly associated with Todd Chandler, before switching her affections to Ricky Mandel, appearing as his storyline girlfriend.

On May 10, 2014, Martinez and J. T. Dunn competed in the 2014 WSU Queen and King of the Ring tournament, losing to the team of Candice LeRae and Joey Ryan. In 2016, Martinez appeared on TNA's One Night Only: Knockouts Knockdown 4, where she fought Rebel in a losing effort.

Martinez announced her retirement from professional wrestling in May 2017.

== Other media ==
She also starred in a pin-up film titled American Pinups Vol. 2. Martinez collaborated with Jewel De'Nyle on an all-female spanking and soft-core bondage video entitled The Notorious Jewel De'Nyle & Shelly Martinez. In October 2009, Martinez posed nude for a contest called "THE 1 Contest". In November 2012, Martinez appeared on the fourth season of the Bad Girls Club spin-off Love Games: Bad Girls Need Love Too.

She starred in the independent supernatural horror movie Dead Things. In addition, she was a contestant on the reality show The Search for the Next Elvira, which debuted October 13, 2007, on the Fox Reality Channel and was a semifinalist for Miss HorrorFest 2008. Martinez appears in the beginning of the Mötley Crüe music video for "Saints of Los Angeles". In May 2011, Martinez, Raven, and Cheerleader Melissa filmed the music video for the Smashing Pumpkins hit song "Owata".

As of late 2011, Martinez has been the official Hollywood event correspondent and the hostess for the horror news website MoreHorror.com.

She appears as herself in the 1000 Ways to Die segment "Slippery When Dead."

== Filmography ==
Year	Title	Role	Notes
2002	Professional Wrestling: Tricks of the Trade	Desire	Documentary
2005	Dead Things	Troy's girlfriend	
2007	WWE Hall of Fame 2007	Self	TV special
2007	The Search for the Next Elvira	Self; contestant	7th place, 2 episodes
2007	The Notorious Jewel De'Nyle & Shelly Martinez	Self	Direct to video
2008	Secretos	Stripper	1 episode
2008	Silent Bloody Night	Charlene	Short film
2009	Porn Shoot Massacre	Christy	Direct to video
2009	The Scream	Scream babe	Direct to video
2009	The Rotation	Shelly	Direct to video
2010	How Weed Won the West	Self	Documentary
2011	1000 Ways to Die	Wrestler	1 episode
2011	Sprinkles: The Mighty Mermen From Mars	Sprinkles	Direct to video
2011	Sketchers Comedy Special	The brunette	Direct to video
2012	Total Knockouts	Self; cast member	Pilot
2012	Johnny V's Reality Stars	Self; reality star	1 episode
2012	Love Games: Bad Girls Need Love Too season 4	Self; ex girlfriend	1 episode
2013	Extreme Championship Comedy Takeover	Self	
2013	The Two Girls	Kelly	1 episode
2014	At What Cost? Anatomy of Professional Wrestling	Self	Documentary
2015	The C & Borracho Show	Puppet of the month	1 episode
2016	DaZe: Vol. Too - NonSeNse	Vampire	
2016	Red Light Diaries	Savannah	1 episode
2016	Trump Punisher	Dungeon seductress	Short film
2016	underPAID	Waitress	2 episodes
2017	Ballerina I'm Not	Self	Documentary
2017	The Eliminadora	Day of the dead wrestler	Short film
2018	Middle of the Night	Devin	
2019	Horror Kung-Fu Theatre	Self	6 episodes
2019	Speed Dragon	Sugar	
2021	The Other Side of the Ring	Self	Documentary
2022	Toon in with Me	Super-Tooner	1 episode
2024	Darkness of the Night	Angela	Short film

== Personal life ==
Martinez is of Mexican descent. She is an advocate of medical marijuana and is also an animal rights activist.

== Championships and accomplishments ==
- Empire Wrestling Federation
  - EWF Tag Team Championship (1 time) – with Threat
- Wrestling Observer Newsletter
  - Worst Match of the Year (2016) vs. Rebel at Knockouts Knockdown 2016
