= The Kindness Diaries =

- Genre: Documentary
- Created by: James Lockard; Leon Logothetis
- Written by: Ric Enriquez; James Lockard; Leon Logothetis
- Directed by: James Lockard; Michael Bohusz
- Starring: Leon Logothetis
- Theme music composer: Dimiter Yordanov
- Composer: Dimiter Yordanov
- Country of origin: United States
- Original language: English
- No. of seasons: 2
- No. of episodes: 26

Production
- Executive producers: Ric Enriquez; Leon Logothetis; Steven Priovolos; James Locard

Original release
- Network: Netflix
- Release: February 21, 2017 – January 22, 2019

The Kindness Diaries is a documentary television series on Netflix and Discovery+. The series stars former broker Leon Logothetis and debuted in 2017. In a Facebook Live, Leon announced the show would be renewed for a third season. In the series, Logothetis travels around the world relying only on the kindness of strangers for food, shelter, and gas. In the first season, he uses a vintage Chang Jiang motorcycle and sidecar he calls Kindness 1, after The Motorcycle Diaries, which served as an inspiration for his journey. In season 2, he uses a vintage Volkswagen Beetle convertible, which he names Kindness 2. His journey in season 2 moves from Alaska to Argentina. The series also airs on BYUtv. As of June 2021, the series began streaming on Discovery+.

== Premise ==
Logothetis travels around the world relying on the kindness of strangers for food, shelter, gas, etc. He cannot accept money. He also listens to their stories while visiting. In exchange for their kindness, he helps them realise their dreams to pay it forward.
