= Cindy Margolis =

American glamour spokesmodel and actress (born 1965)

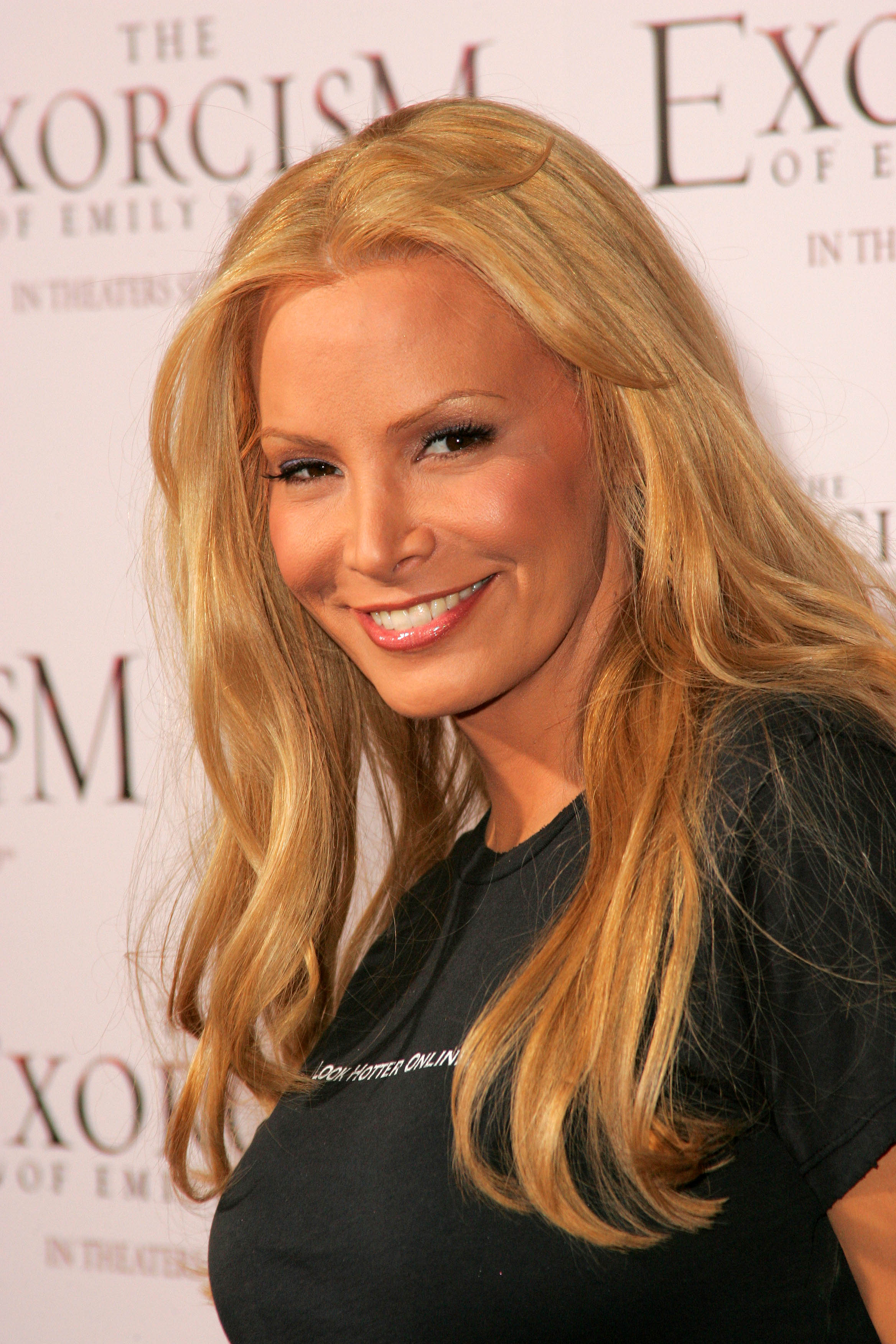
- Margolis in 2005
- Born: Cynthia Dawn Margolis; October 1, 1965 (age 61); Los Angeles, California, U.S.
- Education: California State University, Northridge
- Known for: Spokesmodel; actress
- Height: 5 ft 7.75 in (1.72 m)
- Spouse: Guy Starkman (m. 1998; div. 2009)
- Children: 3
- Website: www.cindymargolis.com

Cynthia Dawn Margolis (born October 1, 1965) is an American glamour spokesmodel and actress.

== Personal life ==
Margolis was born in Los Angeles, California, the daughter of Karyn O. (née Cleere) and William C. Margolis. According to an interview in Playboy, her career began with a business class project on greeting cards at the California State University at Northridge, where she produced cards with a photograph of herself wearing lingerie and including her phone number.

Margolis was raised Jewish. She was married to restaurateur Guy Starkman. Following in-vitro fertility treatment, she gave birth to son Nicholas Isaac in 2002. Twin daughters Sabrina and Sierra were born in 2005 with the incubation of a surrogate mother. Margolis and her husband separated in 2008.

== Career ==
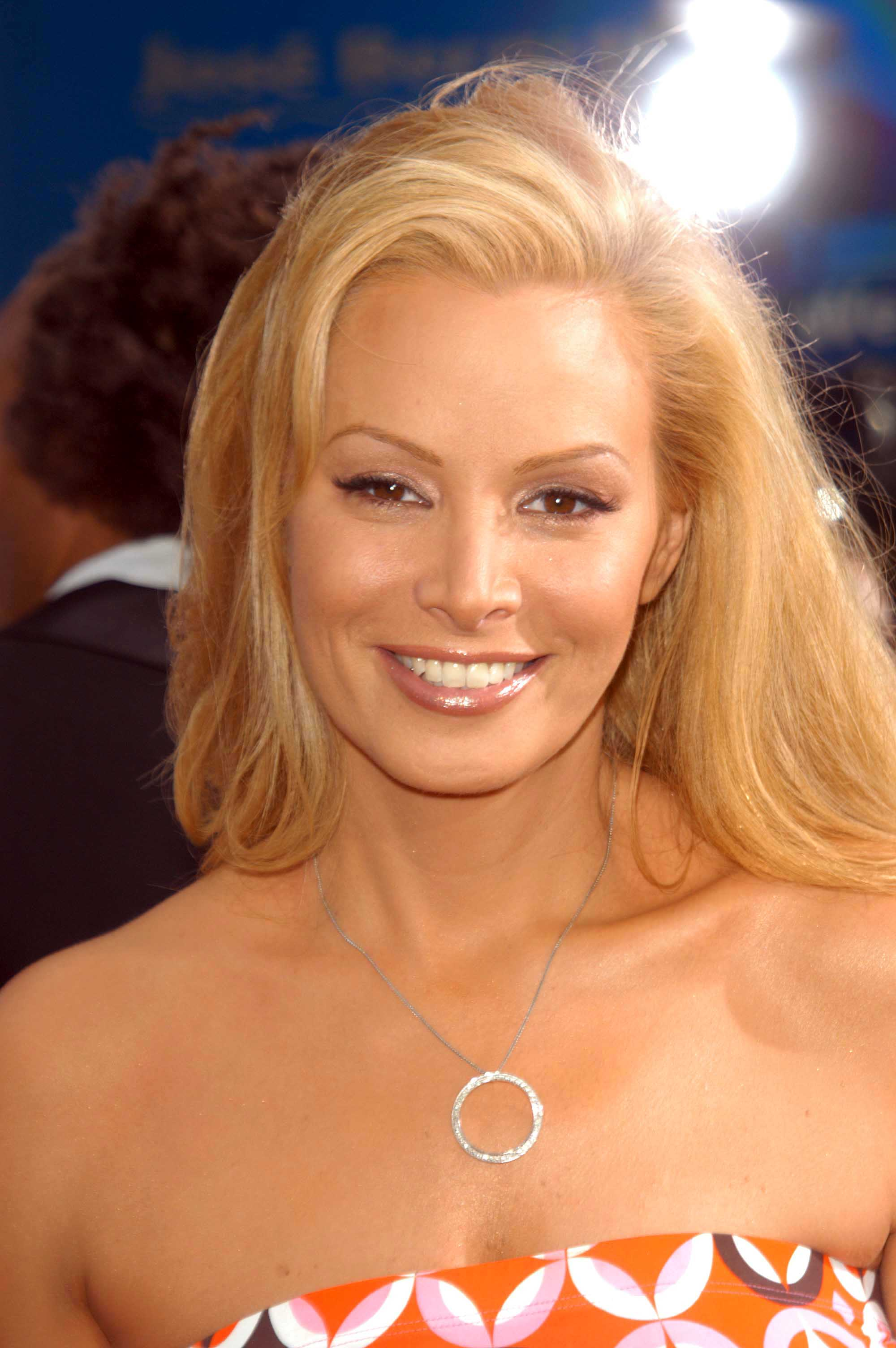
Cindy Margolis in 2003

Margolis’ modeling career took off when agents started asking about the woman on the cards. She has modeled in advertising for companies such as Reebok, Vidal Sassoon, Coors, Frederick's of Hollywood, Hanes, and Sunkist. She was Miss Makita Power Tools 1986 and did appearances at woodworking trade shows.

Among late night television viewers, she is best known as an infomercial co-presenter including work with Tony Robbins and Don Lapre. Margolis also appeared briefly as one of Barker's Beauties in 1995 on the game show The Price Is Right. She also appeared as a fembot in the movie Austin Powers: International Man of Mystery. On September 16, 1999, she appeared on an episode of WWE Smackdown in a segment where she received a figure-four leglock from Jeff Jarrett. She had a late night Saturday talk show in 2000 called The Cindy Margolis Show, which was filmed in Miami Beach, Florida.

Margolis emerged as a star in the early days of the internet. She was named Yahoo! Internet Life magazine's "Queen of the Internet" from 1996 to 1999. She also found her way into the 2000 Guinness Book of World Records as a result of being the "most downloaded" person in 1999. At the peak of her popularity, images of Margolis were downloaded 70,000 times in a span of 24 hours.

In November 2005, Margolis teamed up with the World Poker Tour to become the new hostess for Chipleaders. In an April 2006 interview with The Washington Post, Margolis discussed her nude photo session for the December 2006 issue of Playboy, saying that she had posed for Playboy many times in the past, but never completely nude. She cited her good looks at age 40 and wanting to be an inspiration to mothers and women her age as the reason she chose to finally pose nude. "It will be fun to go up against the 20-year-olds and show them that they don't have anything on me!" she told the Associated Press. In an interview with EXTRA! magazine she said that the television show Desperate Housewives had been an inspiration for her as it showed that mothers her age could also be fit and sexy. A portion of the proceeds from the issues sold were pledged go to a charity for which Margolis is a spokeswoman, "Resolve". This charity aims to get fertility treatment better covered by insurance companies.

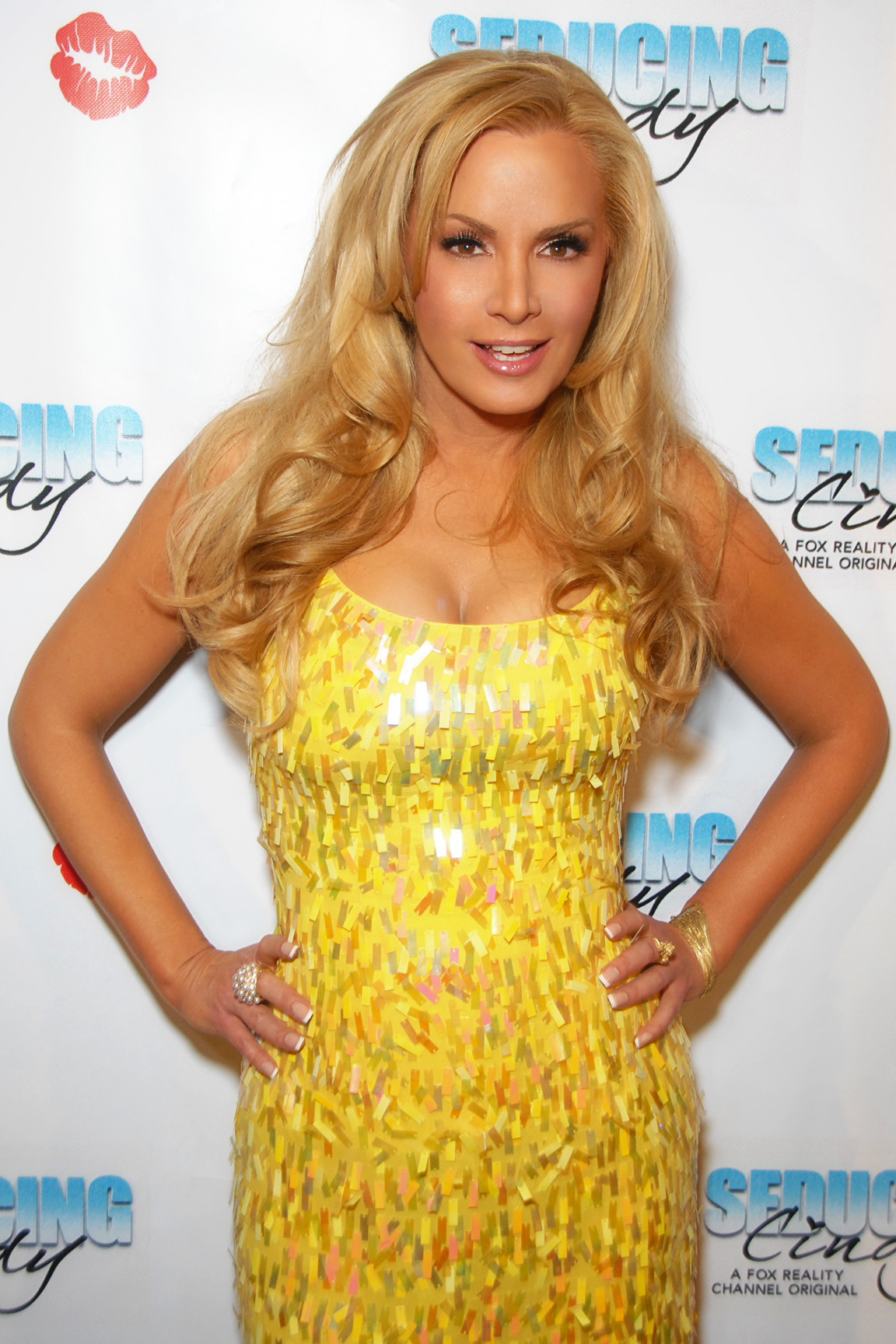
Cindy Margolis promoting her show Seducing Cindy in 2010

Margolis posed for a second Playboy pictorial for the July 2008 issue. A portion of the sales of her issue went to her charity, the Cindy Margolis Get a Download of This Fertility Fund. She was very proud to have posed, stating:

Me, of all people, the ultimate girl next door, the one who made it by not taking off her clothes. And now my crowning achievement is doing Playboy and being comfortable in my own skin.

In 2006, she was the winner of NBC's Celebrity Cooking Showdown. She teamed up with celebrity chef Wolfgang Puck to win both the first and final rounds. In 2008, she was to perform as a magician on CBS's Secret Talents of the Stars, but didn't get the chance when the show was cancelled after only one episode was made. Later that year, production began on a new Fox Reality Channel original series, Seducing Cindy, a dating reality show in which male contestants, aged 18–49, battled to win the affection of Margolis. The show premiered on January 30, 2010.

=== Poker ===
Margolis played as an amateur in the Pro Am Equalizer poker tournament against fellow amateur Jeremy Sisto and professionals Howard Lederer, Jennifer Harman, Phil Laak and Chris Ferguson.

Cindy Margolis manager/publicist since 1992 is Neil Cirucci

== Filmography ==
=== Film ===
Year	Title	Role	Notes
1997	Austin Powers: International Man of Mystery	Fembot	
1997	Earth Minus Zero	Pizza Girl	
1998	Chairman of the Board	Tennis Instructor	
2002	Dead Above Ground	Kari McClure Mallory	
2003	Sol Goode	Angie	
2007	The Bros.	Herself	
2015	Sharknado 3: Oh Hell No!	Herself	

=== Television ===
Year	Title	Role	Notes
1992	Married... with Children	Beer Girl #1	Episode: "The Chicago Wine Party"
1993	Baywatch	Girl #1	Episode: "Sky Rider"
1993-96	The Price Is Right	Try-Out Model	Guest: Season 22, Recurring Cast: Season 24
1996	Baywatch Nights	Katy Calder	Episode: "Circle of Fear"
1997	Conan the Adventurer	Hissah Zul's Serving Girl	Episode: "The Heart of the Elephant: Part 1 & 2"
1998	Penn & Teller's Sin City Spectacular	Herself	Episode: "Episode #1.22"
1999	WWE SmackDown	Herself	Recurring Cast: Season 1
1999	Pensacola: Wings of Gold	Holly	Episode: "Fox Two"
1999	Suddenly Susan	Herself	Episode: "The New Gate"
1999	Shasta McNasty	Our Girl	Recurring Cast
2000	Hollywood Squares	Herself/Panelist	Recurring Panelist
2000	The Cindy Margolis Show	Herself/Host	Main Host
2000	The Hughleys	Heather	Episode: "She's a Brickhouse"
2000-02	The Price Is Right	Herself/Panelist	Guest Panelist: Season 1-2
2001	The Test	Herself/Panelist	Episode: "The Risk Test"
2001	Mad TV	Herself	Episode: "Episode #6.24"
2001	Ally McBeal	Herself	Episode: "Cloudy Skies, Chance of Parade"
2002	E! True Hollywood Story	Herself	Episode: "The Price Is Right"
2003	Music Mania	Herself/Bikini Contest Judge	Main Judge
2004	I Love the '90s	Herself	Episode: "1992"
2005	Steve Harvey's Big Time Challenge	Herself	Episode: "Episode #2.16"
2005	Game Show Moments Gone Bananas	Herself	Episode: "Episode #1.5"
2005	Joey	Herself	Episode: "Joey and the Poker"
2005-06	My Fair Brady	Herself	Recurring Cast
2006	Biker Mice from Mars	Twinkle (voice)	Episode: "It's the Pits"
2007	Identity	Herself	Episode: "Episode #1.8"
2008	Head Case	Herself	Episode: "Dreading Bells"
2010	Cubed	Herself	Episode: "Episode #1.32"
2010	The Virtual Revolution	Herself	Episode: "The Cost of Free"
2010	Seducing Cindy	Herself	Main Cast
2012	Beverly Hills Nannies	Herself	Main Cast
