= West Coast Wrestling Connection =

- Genre: Professional wrestling
- Country of origin: United States
- No. of episodes: 194

Production
- Production location: Salem, Oregon
- Camera setup: Multiple-camera setup
- Running time: 60 minutes (including commercials)

Original release
- Network: KPDX Portland, Oregon (May 2014 – 2020)
- Release: May 24, 2014 – 2020

The West Coast Wrestling Connection (WCWC) is a professional wrestling organization based in Salem, Oregon.

The WCWC was founded by Jeff Manning and Pat Kelley in 2005.

== History ==
The WCWC had its inaugural show in Salem, Oregon on March 20, 2005. Shows are held across western Oregon, with a monthly live event in Salem.

The WCWC on PDX-TV debuted on May 24, 2014. The promotion shoots a live TV taping, typically the first Saturday of each month. These tapings were originally held at the Bob White Theatre in Southeast Portland, but have since relocated to the Jackson Armory. The television broadcasts team consists of Jeff Akin on play-by-play and Morty Lipschitz on color commentary.

== Championships ==
As of August 11, 2026.

=== Current championships ===
Championship	Champion	Previous	Date won	Days	Location
WCWC Pacific Northwest Championship	Caleb Konley	Mike Camden	May 6, 2018	3019+	Clackamas, Oregon
WCWC Legacy Championship	Gangrel	Mikey O'Shea	May 5, 2018	3020+	Portland, Oregon
WCWC Tag Team Championship	The Fit Club (Dillon Divine and Matt XStatic)	Young and Greene (Anthony Greene and Jakob Austin Young)	March 3, 2018	3083+	Clackamas, Oregon
WCWC Oregon Heavyweight Championship	Ricky Gibson	Vacant	July 15, 2018	2949+	Salem, Oregon
WCWC Oregon Tag Team Championship	Jacub Soumis and Spicy McHaggis	4 Minutes Of Heat (Billy Pearl, Eddie Pearl and Ricky Gibson)	September 9, 2018	2893+	Salem, Oregon

In the Spring of 2017 the WCWC introduced two new championships that would be defended exclusively on live events. Both inaugural champions were determined in tournaments, with matches being held at various live events throughout the state of Oregon.

Championship	Champion	Previous	Date Won	Days	Location
WCWC Oregon Championship	Vacant	Ethan HD	February 11, 2018	3103+	Salem, Oregon
WCWC Oregon Tag Team Champions	4 Minutes of Heat (Ricky Gibson & Eddie Pearl)	Marcus Malone & Julian Whyt	February 11, 2018	3103+	Salem, Oregon

=== Defunct championships ===
Championship	Final Champion	Previous	Date Won	Date Defunct
WCWC Lightning Division Championship	Eric Right	Freddy Bravo	July 7, 2013	September 1, 2013

== The Grappler's WCWC Academy ==
The Grappler runs the WCWC Training Academy in Salem, Oregon. The school is operated under the direction of lead trainer Erik Baeden.

== WCWC Pacific Northwest Championship ==
WCWC Pacific Northwest Championship

Details
- Promotion: West Coast Wrestling Connection
- Current champion: Darin Corbin
- Date won: July 2, 2017

Other names
- WCWC Championship (April 24, 2005 - January 15, 2006), (June 15, 2010 - July 17, 2011), (October 1, 2012 - 2014); WCWC Heavyweight Championship (January 15, 2006 - June 15, 2010); NWA Northwest Championship (July 17, 2011 - October 1, 2012); WCWC Pacific Northwest Championship (2014 - present)
Statistics
- First champion: George Michael
- Most reigns: George Michael (6 times)
- Longest reign: The Grappler 3 (338 days)
- Shortest reign: Gangrel and Adam Thornstowe (<1 day)
- Oldest champion: Gangrel (44 years, 6 months, 28 days)

The WCWC Pacific Northwest Championship is the top championship in the WCWC. It was first awarded on April 24, 2005 when George Michael became the inaugural champion.

As of August 11, 2026.

#	Order in reign history
Reign	The reign number for the specific set of wrestlers listed
—	Used for vacated reigns so as not to count it as an official reign
+	Indicates the current reign is changing daily

#	Champion	Reign	Date	Days held	Location	Notes	Ref
1	George Michael	1	April 24, 2005	148	Salem, Oregon		
—	Vacated	—	September 19, 2005	—	—	—	
2	George Michael	2	October 16, 2005	35		Defeated Cole Bishop for the vacant title.	
3	The Blue Meanie	1	November 20, 2005	28	Salem, Oregon		
4	The Little Nasty Boy	1	December 18, 2005	90	Salem, Oregon	Defeated Blue Meanie and George Michael in a 3-way match.	
5	Diafullah the Butcher	1	March 18, 2006	119	Eugene, Oregon		
—	Vacated	—	July 15, 2006	—	—	Title is vacated upon Diaffulah the Butcher leaving the promotion.	
6	George Michael	3	August 19, 2006	211		Michael was awarded the title.	
7	Havoc	1	March 18, 2007	154	Salem, Oregon		
8	George Michael	4	August 19, 2007	118	Salem, Oregon		
9	Moose Morrow	1	December 15, 2007	64	Roseburg, Oregon		
10	J.D. Michaels	1	February 17, 2008		Salem, Oregon		
—	Vacated	—	April 5, 2008	—	—	Title is vacated when J.D. Michaels no-shows a scheduled title defense.	
11	Moose Morrow	2	April 5, 2008	15	Roseburg, Oregon	Morrow defeated Dr. Kliever and George Michael in a 3-way match.	
12	George Michael	5	April 20, 2008	49	Salem, Oregon		
13	Moose Morrow	3	June 8, 2008	111	Roseburg, Oregon		
14	Dr. Kliever	1	September 27, 2008	126	Springfield, Oregon		
15	G.Q. Gallo	1	January 31, 2009	77	Springfield, Oregon	Gallo defeated Cedric who was subbing for Dr. Kliever.	
16	George Michael	6	April 18, 2009	98	Springfield, Oregon		
17	Aaron Bolo	1	July 25, 2009	98	Springfield, Oregon		
18	Ryan Taylor	1	October 31, 2009	302	Portland, Oregon		
19	Dr. Kliever	2	August 29, 2010	139	Portland, Oregon		
20	Erik Baeden	1	January 15, 2011	252	Portland, Oregon	Baeden defeated Moose Morrow who was subbing for Dr. Kliever.	
21	Mike Santiago	1	September 24, 2011	120	Salem, Oregon	Santigao defeated Baeden and Dr. Kliever in a 3-way match.	
22	Michelle Starr	1	January 22, 2012	147	Salem, Oregon	Starr defeated Dr. Kliever to win the title.	
22	Nick Madrid	1	June 17, 2012	203	Salem, Oregon		
23	Ethan HD	1	January 6, 2013	238	Salem, Oregon		
24	Gangrel	1	September 1, 2013	35	Salem, Oregon		
25	Darin Corbin	1	October 6, 2013		Salem, Oregon		
—	Vacated	—	April 2014	—	—	Title was vacated after Corbin was suspended.	(Note: The exact length of Corbin's first reign is unknown. It could have lasted between 177 and 206 days.)
26	"Hotshot" Danny Duggan	1	April 5, 2014	252	Salem, Oregon	Duggan won a tournament to become the new champion.	
27	Hammerstone	1	December 13, 2014	203	Portland, Oregon		
28	Gangrel	2	July 4, 2015	<1	Portland, Oregon		
29	Hammerstone	2	July 4, 2015	91	Portland, Oregon		
30	Gangrel	3	October 3, 2015	126	Portland, Oregon		
31	Caleb Konley	1	February 6, 2016	28	Portland, Oregon		
32	Eric Right	1	March 5, 2016	28	Portland, Oregon	Right defeated Konley 2-1 in an Iron Man match. It aired on WCWC on PDX-TV #098 on a tape delay date of April 9, 2016. It was held up after the match. Right defeated Konley in a Title vs. Mustache match to win the title. It aired on WCWC on PDX-TV #100 on a tape delay date of April 23, 2016.	
—	Vacated	—	April 2, 2016	—	—	Vacated when Eric Right wins the WCWC Legacy Championship in a Title vs. Title match. It aired on WCWC on PDX-TV #102 on a tape delay date of May 7, 2016.	
33	The Grappler 3	2	April 2, 2016	154	Portland, Oregon	Previously won the title as Erik Baeden.	
34	Adam Thornstowe	1	September 3, 2016	<1	Portland, Oregon	Thornstowe pinned the Grappler 3 in a six-man tag team match to become the new champion. It aired on WCWC on PDX-TV #122 on a tape delay date of October 15, 2016.	
35	The Grappler 3	3	September 3, 2016	338	Portland, Oregon	It aired on WCWC on PDX-TV #124 on a tape delay date of October 15, 2016.	
36	Matt Striker	1	June 10, 2017	22	Clackamas, Oregon	It aired on WCWC on PDX-TV #124 on a tape delay date of July 8, 2017.	
37	Darin Corbin	2	July 2, 2017	138	Clackamas, Oregon	It aired on WCWC on PDX-TV #162 on a tape delay date of September 2, 2017.	
38	Jeff Boom	1	Nov 11, 2017	51	Clackamas, Oregon	It aired on WCWC on PDX-TV #180	
39	Jeff Boom	2	Jan 1, 2018	61	Clackamas, Oregon	It aired on WCWC on PDX-TV #187	
40	Mike Camden	1	Mar 3, 2018	3327+	Clackamas, Oregon	It aired on WCWC on PDX-TV #196	

As of August 11, 2026.

†	Indicates the current champion
<1	The reign is shorter than one day.
¤	The exact length of at least one title reign is uncertain, so the shortest possible length is used.

Rank	Champion	No. of reigns	Combined days
1	Erik Baeden/The Grappler 3	3	744
2	George Michael	6	656
3	Ryan Taylor	1	302
4	Hammerstone	2	294
5	Dr. Kliever	2	265
6	"Hotshot" Danny Duggan	1	252
7	Darin Corbin†	2	3504+¤
8	Ethan HD	1	238
9	Nick Madrid	1	203
10	Moose Morrow	3	190
11	Gangrel	3	161
12	Havoc	1	154
13	Michelle Starr	1	147
14	Mike Santiago	1	120
15	Diafullah the Butcher	1	119
16	Aaron Bolo	1	98
17	Little Nasty Boy	1	90
18	G.Q. Gallo	1	77
19	The Blue Meanie	1	28
19	Caleb Konley	1	28
19	Eric Right	1	28
22	Matt Striker	1	22
23	Adam Thornstowe	1	<1

== WCWC Tag Team Championship ==
WCWC Tag Team Championship

Details
- Promotion: West Coast Wrestling Connection
- Current champions: Fight & Flight (Mikey O'Shea & Damian Drake)
- Date won: June 3, 2017

Other names
- WCWC Tag Team Championship (May 15, 2005 - July 17, 2011), (October 1, 2012 - present); NWA Northwest Tag Team Championship (July 17, 2011 - October 1, 2012)
Statistics
- First champions: OTB (Memphis Raines & Mike Dempsey)
- Most reigns: By team: The Amerikan Guns (Mike Santiago & Ethan HD) (4 times) and by wrestler: Mike Santiago and Erik Baeden/The Grappler 3 (5 times)
- Longest reign: Franchise Players (Cedric the Hitman & Dr. Kliever) (342 days)
- Shortest reign: Painfully Large (Chuck Payne & Patrick Large), Caleb Konley & Mikey O'Shea, The Amerikan Guns (Ethan HD & Mike Santiago), Gangrel & Sinn Bodhi (<1 day)

The WCWC Tag Team Championship is the tag team championship contested in the WCCW. It was first awarded on May 15, 2005 OTB (Memphis Raines & Mike Dempsey) became the first champions.

As of August 11, 2026.

#	Order in reign history
Reign	The reign number for the specific set of wrestlers listed
—	Used for vacated reigns so as not to count it as an official reign
+	Indicates the current reign is changing daily

#	Champion	Reign	Date	Days held	Location	Notes	Ref
1	OTB (Memphis Raines & Mike Dempsey)	1	May 15, 2005	217	Salem, Oregon		
2	Critter & Cole Bishop	1	December 18, 2005	62	Salem, Oregon	Critter defeated OTB in a handicap match to win the titles.	
3	Damon Scythe & J-Sin Sullivan	1	February 2, 2006	1	Eugene, Oregon		
4	Critter & Cole Bishop	2	February 19, 2006	28	Salem, Oregon		
5	Franchise Players (Cedric the Hitman & G-Shock)	1	March 19, 2006	119	Salem, Oregon		
6	The Outlaw & Tim Anderson	1	July 16, 2006	90	Salem, Oregon	Upon The Outlaw leaving the promotion, Jason Styles replaces him as the other half of the champions on October 14, 2006. It is unclear if it is a separate reign or a continuation.	
7	Cosmic River & J-Sin Sullivan (2)	1	October 15, 2006	35	Salem, Oregon		
8	Havoc & Twist	1	November 19, 2006	147	Salem, Oregon		
9	Rollin 2 Deep (Cadillac Caliss & Wildcard)	1	April 15, 2007	126	Salem, Oregon	Rolling 2 Deep defeated Havoc and Kid Kool.	
10	Jenkins Cousins (Billy & Bobby Jenkins)	1	August 19, 2007	63	Salem, Oregon		
11	Franchise Players (Cedric the Hitman (2) & Dr. Kliever)	2	October 21, 2007	342	Salem, Oregon		
12	Shoot 2 Kill (Dustin Snyder & Erik Baeden)	1	September 27, 2008	152	Springfield, Oregon		
13	G.Q. Gallo & Mike Modest	1	February 28, 2009	49	Springfield, Oregon		
14	Aaron Bolo & Mike Santiago	1	April 18, 2009	70	Springfield, Oregon		
15	Domestic Partnership (Bobby Fletcher & Deryck Crosse)	1	June 27, 2009	126	Springfield, Oregon		
16	Paynefully Large (Chuck Payne & Patrick Large)	1	October 31, 2009	<1	Portland, Oregon		
—	Vacated	—	October 31, 2009	—	Portland, Oregon	Painfully large were stripped of the titles right after the match.	
17	Shoot 2 Kill (Dustin Snyder & Erik Baeden)	2	February 21, 2010	223	Springfield, Oregon	Shoot 2 Kill defeated Aaron Bolo and Mike Santiago in best two out of three falls tournament final to become the champions.	
—	Vacated	—	October 2, 2010	—	—	The title are vacated when Snyder retires.	
18	El Tucson & "Pretty" Peter Avalon	1	November 21, 2010	90	Springfield, Oregon	They defeated Erik Baeden and Jonas Albert Robinson to win the vacant titles.	
19	The Faction (Erik Baeden (3) & George Michael)	1	February 19, 2011	148	Molalla, Oregon		
20	Paynefully Large (Chuck Payne & Patrick Large)	2	July 17, 2011	126	Salem, Oregon		
21	Love American Style (Freddy Bravo & Nate Andrews)	1	November 20, 2011	126	Salem, Oregon		
22	The Can-Am Experience (Dillon Divine & Matt X-Static)	1	March 25, 2012	189	Salem, Oregon	The Can-Am Experience defeated Love American Style and Eric Right & Ethan HD in a 3-way match to win the titles.	
23	Maxwell Chicago & Champ Mathews	1	September 30, 2012	34	Salem, Oregon		
—	Vacated	—	November 4, 2012	—	Salem, Oregon	The title are declared vacant after a match between The Cam-Am Experience and Maxwell Chicago and Champ Mathews ends in a no-contest.	
24	Family Stone (Cedric the Hitman (3) & Erik Baeden (4))	1	April 6, 2013	120	Salem, Oregon	Family Stone defeated the Can-Am Experience in the finals of a tournament to win the vacant titles.	
25	House Of Hess (Wade Hess (2) & Cody Smith)	1	August 4, 2013	63	Salem, Oregon	House of Hess defeated Cedric the Hitman and Jonas Albert Robinson. Robinson was subbing for an injured Erik Baeden.	
—	Vacated	—	October 6, 2013	—	Salem, Oregon	The title are declared vacant after a match between The House of Hess and Family Stone (Cedric the Hitman & Erik Baeden) ends in a no-contest.	
26	The Amerikan Guns (Ethan HD & Mike Santiago (2))	1	December 1, 2013	216	Salem, Oregon	The Amerikan Guns defeated The Hippies (Peaceful Willow & Seagull Dream), Cody Smith and Eric Right, Geronimo Jones and Kris Klash, Jay Maddix and Matt XStatic, Freddy Bravo and Johnny Yuma, Nate Andrews, Nick Madrid, and Pretty Intelligent (Ashton Vuitton & Causmo) in a Stampede Rumble match.	
27	Caleb Konley & Mikey O'Shea	1	July 5, 2014	<1	Portland, Oregon	It aired on WCWC on PDX-TV #010 on a tape delay date of July 26, 2014	
28	The Amerikan Guns (Ethan HD & Mike Santiago (3))	2	July 5, 2014	29	Portland, Oregon	It was contested in a handcuff match. It aired on WCWC on PDX-TV #011 on a tape delay date of August 2, 2014.	
29	Dan Joseph & Eric Right	1	August 3, 2014	1	Salem, Oregon		
30	The Amerikan Guns (Ethan HD & Mike Santiago (4))	3	August 4, 2014	89	Portland, Oregon		
31	Gangrel & Mikey O'Shea (2)	1	November 11, 2014	15	Portland, Oregon		
32	The Wrecking Crew (The Grappler 3 & Hammerstone)	1	November 16, 2014	104	Portland, Oregon	It was contested in a best two out of three falls match. It aired on WCWC on PDX-TV #037 on a tape delay date of January 31, 2015.	
33	Jeremy Blanchard & Mikey O'Shea (3)	1	February 28, 2015	35	Portland, Oregon	It aired on WCWC on PDX-TV #045 on a tape delay date of April 4, 2015.	
—	Vacated	—	April 4, 2015	—	—	The titles are vacated when Blanchard and O'Shea split up.	
34	Whirlwind Gentlemen (Jack Manley & Remy Marcel)	1	May 9, 2015	119	Portland, Oregon	The Whirlwhind Gentleman defeated Jeremy Blanchard and Kevin Kross to win the vacant titles. It aired on WCWC on PDX-TV #051 on a tape delay date of May 16, 2015.	
35	The Amerikan Guns (Ethan HD & Mike Santiago (5))	4	September 5, 2015	<1	Portland, Oregon	It aired on WCWC on PDX-TV #068 on a tape delay date of September 12, 2015.	
36	Whirlwind Gentlemen (Jack Manley & Remy Marcel)	2	September 5, 2015	119	Portland, Oregon	This was contested in a Falls Count Anywhere match. It aired on WCWC on PDX-TV #070 on a tape delay date of September 26, 2015.	
37	Greg Romero & Ricky Gibson	1	January 2, 2016	126	Portland, Oregon		
—	Vacated	—	May 7, 2016	—	—	—	
38	The Bonus Boyz (Clutch & Sugar Brown)	1	June 11, 2016	56	Portland, Oregon	Defeated Adam Thornstowe and Jeff Boom, Marcus Malone and Mikey O'Shea, and J.J. Garrett and Ricky Gibson in 4-way elimination match. It aired on WCWC on PDX-TV #111 on a tape delay date of July 9, 2016.	
39	Gangrel (2) & Sinn Bodhi	1	August 6, 2016	<1	Portland, Oregon	It aired on WCWC on PDX-TV #119 on a tape delay date of September 3, 2016.	
40	The Bonus Boyz (Clutch & Sugar Brown)	2	August 6, 2016	301	Portland, Oregon	It aired on WCWC on PDX-TV #120 on a tape delay date of September 10, 2016.	
41	Fight & Flight (Mikey O'Shea (4) & Damian Drake)	1	June 3, 2017	3356+	Clackamas, Oregon		

As of August 11, 2026.

†	Indicates the current champion

Rank	Wrestler	No. of reigns	Combined days
1	Shoot 2 Kill (Dustin Snyder & Erik Baeden)	2	375
2	The Bonus Boyz (Clutch & Sugar Brown)	2	357
3	Franchise Players (Cedric the Hitman (2) & Dr. Kliever)	1	342
4	The Amerikan Guns (Ethan HD & Mike Santiago )	4	334
5	Whirlwind Gentlemen (Jack Manley & Remy Marcel)	2	238
6	OTB (Memphis Raines & Mike Dempsey)	1	217
7	The Can-Am Experience (Dillon Divine & Matt X-Static)	1	189
8	The Faction (Erik Baeden & George Michael)	1	148
9	Havoc & Twist	1	147
10	Rollin 2 Deep (Cadillac Caliss & Wildcard)	1	126
10	Domestic Partnership (Bobby Fletcher & Deryck Crosse)	1	126
10	Paynefully Large (Chuck Payne & Patrick Large)	2	126
10	Love American Style (Freddy Bravo & Nate Andrews)	1	126
10	Greg Romero & Ricky Gibson	1	126
15	Family Stone (Cedric the Hitman & Erik Baeden)	1	120
16	Franchise Players (Cedric the Hitman & G-Shock)	1	119
17	The Wrecking Crew (The Grappler 3 & Hammerstone)	1	104
18	Critter & Cole Bishop	2	90
18	The Outlaw & Tim Anderson	1	90
18	El Tucson & "Pretty" Peter Avalon	1	90
21	Aaron Bolo & Mike Santiago	1	70
22	Fight & Flight (Mikey O'Shea & Damian Drake)†	1	3356+
22	Jenkins Cousins (Billy & Bobby Jenkins)	1	63
22	House Of Hess (Wade Hess & Cody Smith)	1	63
24	G.Q. Gallo & Mike Modest	1	49
25	Cosmic River & J-Sin Sullivan	1	35
25	Jeremy Blanchard & Mikey O'Shea	1	35
27	Maxwell Chicago & Champ Mathews	1	34
28	Gangrel & Mikey O'Shea	1	15
29	Damon Scythe & J-Sin Sullivan	1	1
29	Dan Joseph & Eric Right	1	1
31	Caleb Konley & Mikey O'Shea	1	<1
31	Gangrel & Sinn Bodhi	1	<1

Rank	Wrestler	No. of reigns	Combined days
1	Erik Baeden/The Grappler 3	5	747
2	Cedric the Hitman	3	581
3	Mike Santiago	5	404
4	Clutch	2	357
4	Sugar Brown	2	357
6	Dr. Kliever	1	342
7	Ethan HD	4	334
8	Jack Manley	2	238
8	Remey Marcel	2	238
10	Memphis Raines	1	217
10	Mike Dempsey	1	217
12	Dillion Divine	1	189
12	Matt X-Static	1	189
14	The Outlaw/Wade Hess	2	153
15	George Michael	1	148
16	Havoc	1	147
16	Twist	1	147
18	Cadillac Caliss	1	126
18	Wildcard	1	126
18	Bobby Fletcher	1	126
18	Deryck Crosse	1	126
18	Chuck Payne	2	126
18	Patrick Large	2	126
18	Freddy Bravo	1	126
18	Nate Andrews	1	126
18	Greg Romero	1	126
18	Ricky Gibson	1	126
28	Mikey O'Shea†	4	3406+
29	G-Shock	1	119
30	Hammerstone	1	104
31	Critter	2	90
31	Cole Bishop	2	90
31	Tim Anderson	1	90
31	El Tucson	1	90
31	"Pretty" Peter Avalon	1	90
36	Aaron Bolo	1	70
37	Damian Drake†	1	3356+
37	Billy Jenkins	1	63
37	Bobby Jenkins	1	63
37	Cody Smith	1	63
40	G.Q. Gallo	1	49
40	Mike Modest	1	49
42	J-Sin Sullivan	2	36
43	Cosmic River	1	35
43	Jeremy Blanchard	1	35
45	Maxwell Chicago	1	34
45	Champ Mathews	1	34
47	Gangrel	2	15
48	Damon Scythe	1	1
48	Dan Joseph	1	1
48	Eric Right	1	1
51	Caleb Konley	1	<1
51	Sinn Bodhi	1	<1

== WCWC Legacy Championship ==
WCWC Legacy Championship

Details
- Promotion: West Coast Wrestling Connection
- Current champion: Remy Marcel
- Date won: July 1, 2017
Statistics
- First champion: Jeremy Blanchard
- Most reigns: Gangrel, Ethan HD, and Ricky Gibson (2 times)
- Longest reign: Jeremy Blanchard (236 days)
- Shortest reign: Gangrel (14 days)
- Oldest champion: Gangrel (45 years, 10 months, 25 days)

The WCWC Legacy Championship is a midcard championship in West Coast Wrestling Connection. Jeremy Blanchard defeated Eric Right on September 1, 2013 to become the first champion.

As of August 11, 2026.

#	Order in reign history
Reign	The reign number for the specific set of wrestlers listed
—	Used for vacated reigns so as not to count it as an official reign
+	Indicates the current reign is changing daily

#	Champion	Reign	Date	Days held	Location	Notes	Ref
1	Jeremy Blanchard	1	September 1, 2013	236	Salem, Oregon	Blanchard defeated Eric Right to become the first champion.	
2	Big Duke	1	May 5, 2014	91	Salem, Oregon		
3	Hammerstone	1	August 3, 2014	132	Salem, Oregon		
—	Vacated	—	December 13, 2014	—	Portland, Oregon	Hammerstone vacated the title upon winning the WCWC Pacific Northwest Championship.	
4	Gangrel	1	January 10, 2015	49	Portland, Oregon	Gangrel defeated Grappler 3 to win the vacant title.	
5	Caleb Konley	1	February 28, 2015	128	Portland, Oregon	It aired on WCWC on PDX-TV #044 on a tape delay date of March 28, 2015.	
6	Mikey O'Shea	1	July 4, 2015	35	Portland, Oregon	It aired on WCWC on PDX-TV #060 on a tape delay date of July 18, 2015.	
7	Joey Ryan	1	August 8, 2015	56	Portland, Oregon	It aired on WCWC on PDX-TV #066 on a tape delay date of August 29, 2015.	
—	Vacated	—	October 3, 2015	—	Portland, Oregon	Ryan was stripped of the title for failing to defend it within 30 days.	
8	The Grappler 3	1	October 3, 2015	182	Portland, Oregon	Grappler 3 defeated Adam Thornstowe, Exile, and Tyshaun Prince to win the vacant title. It aired on WCWC on PDX-TV #072 on a tape delay date of October 10, 2015.	
9	Eric Right	1	April 2, 2016	70	Portland, Oregon	It was a title vs. title match. Right immediately vacated the WCWC Pacific Northwest Championship to focus on defending the Legacy Championship. It aired on WCWC on PDX-TV #102 on a tape delay date of May 7, 2016.	
10	Ethan HD	1	June 11, 2016	84	Portland, Oregon	It aired on WCWC on PDX-TV #112 on a tape delay date of July 16, 2016.	
—	Vacated	—	September 3, 2016	—	Portland, Oregon	The title was vacated due to being held up after a match with Right on September 3, 2016. It aired on WCWC on PDX-TV #123 on a tape delay date of October 1, 2016.	
11	Ethan HD	2	October 1, 2016		Portland, Oregon	Ethan HD defeated Right in a ladder match to win the vacant title. It aired on WCWC on PDX-TV #125 on a tape delay date of October 22, 2016.	
—	Vacated	—	—	—	—	The title was vacated sometime in January 2017. (Note: The exact date of Ethan HD's second reign is unknown. It could have lasted between 92 and 122 days.)	
12	Ricky Gibson	1	February 4, 2017	56	Portland, Oregon	Gibson defeated Adrian Matthews and Eric Right in a 3-way match due to all three hitting the floor at the same times in a battle royal on January 30, 2017	
13	Gangrel	2	April 1, 2017	14	Portland, Oregon		
14	Ricky Gibson	2	April 15, 2017	105	Portland, Oregon		
15	Remy Marcel	1	July 1, 2017	3300+	Clackamas, Oregon		

As of August 11, 2026.

†	Indicates the current champion
¤	The exact length of at least one title reign is uncertain, so the shortest possible length is used.

Rank	Champion	No. of reigns	Combined days
2	Jeremy Blanchard	1	236
2	Remy Marcel†	1	3328+
3	The Grappler 3	1	182
4	Ethan HD	2	176¤
5	Ricky Gibson	2	161
6	Hammerstone	1	132
7	Caleb Konley	1	128
8	Big Duke	1	91
9	Eric Right	1	70
10	Gangrel	1	63
11	Joey Ryan	1	56
12	Mikey O'Shea	1	35

== See also ==
- List of National Wrestling Alliance territories
- List of independent wrestling promotions in the United States
