= Seducing Cindy =

American reality television series

- Genre: Reality-TV
- Created by: Glassman Media
- Starring: Cindy Margolis
- Country of origin: United States
- Original language: English

Production
- Executive producer: Andrew Glassman

Original release
- Network: Fox Reality Channel
- Release: January 30 – March 20, 2010

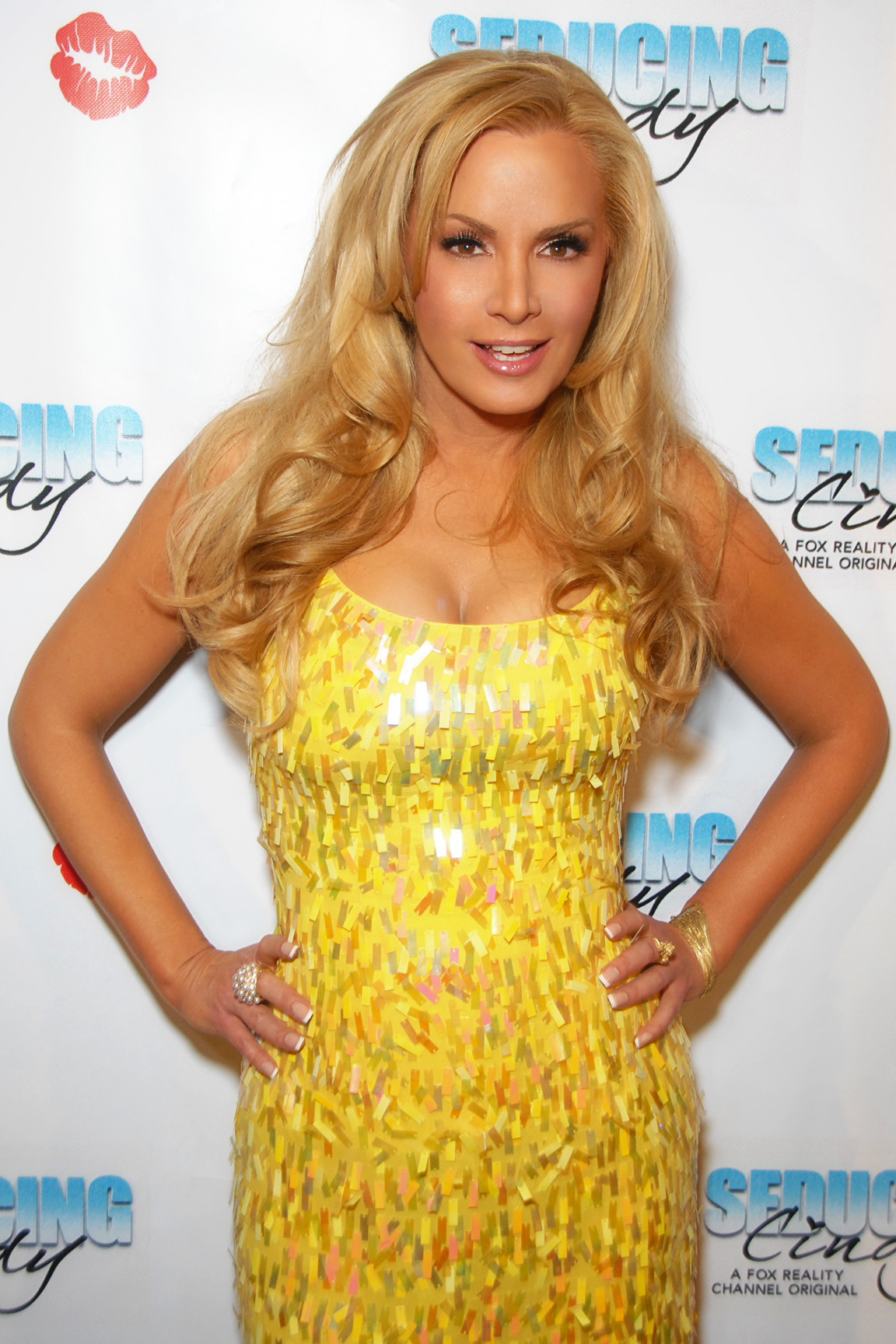
Cindy Margolis hosting the “Seducing Cindy” Finale Party, Studio City, CA on March 18, 2010

Seducing Cindy is a Fox Reality Channel original series that followed the newly single Cindy Margolis on her search for love. The eight-episode, one-hour series premiered on Saturday, January 30, 2010 and ended on March 20, 2010. Due to Fox Reality Channel being rebranded and ceasing operations as Nat Geo Wild on March 29, 2010, focusing on wildlife programs and after that it was the final original series.

== Contestants ==
Name	Age	Description	Eliminated
Leighton Stultz	24	Male Model	Winner
Eric Chine	23	Wrestler	Episode 8
Brian Domingo	46	Jack of All Trades	Episode 8
Jeffrey James Lippold	41	Bad Ass Romantic	Episode 7
Kenny Doane	23	Pro Wrestler	Episode 7
Eric Evanoski	28	Hopeless Romantic	Episode 7
Christopher Mendoza	32	Texan	Episode 6
Chris Noel	29	Musician with Goatee	Episode 6
Timmy Zickuhr	34	Former Class President	Episode 5
Shaun C. Hawkins	42	Emotional Writer	Episode 4
Art Ortiz	25	Personal Trainer	Episode 4
Nathan Anderson^{[n]}	29	Full-time Dad	Episode 4
Terry F. Smith	44	"Eff"-ing Writer	Episode 3
Otoja Abit	23	Roundball Player	Episode 3
Josh Harraway	31	Tupac Impersonator	Episode 2
Marc Hertle	51	Celebrity Dater	Episode 2
Jonathan Brown	20	Graphic Novel Reader	Episode 2
Dave Williams	45	Internet Entrepreneur	Episode 2
Ron Barba	39	Banking Consultant	Episode 1
Nima Tabrizi	21	Nightclub Promoter	Episode 1
Christian Ramirez	29	Master of Language	Episode 1
Andrew Osborn	22	Nude Model	Episode 1
Alex Weinberg	18	College Student	Episode 1
John Livingstone^{[j]}	71	World Traveler	Episode 1

- ^[j] John decided it was too loud and rowdy in the house, and decided to leave.
- ^[n] Nathan missed his kids and decided to leave.

== Episodes ==
No.	Title	Original release date
1	"24 Proposals"	January 30, 2010
2	"Performance Anxiety"	February 6, 2010
3	"Wild Pajama Party"	February 13, 2010
4	"Three Is a Crowd"	February 20, 2010
5	"Twist in the Road"	February 27, 2010
6	"The Real Deal"	March 6, 2010
7	"Petting & Pain"	March 13, 2010
8	"The Final Decision"	March 20, 2010
