= The Search for the Next Elvira =

- Genre: Reality television
- Created by: Eric Gardner & Cassandra Peterson
- Directed by: Jeff Androsky
- Starring: Cassandra Peterson; Christian Greenia; Patterson Lundquist
- Country of origin: United States
- Original language: English
- No. of seasons: 1
- No. of episodes: 4

Production
- Executive producers: Cassandra Peterson; Eric Gardner; Carol Sherman
- Running time: 44 min. approx.

Original release
- Network: Fox Reality
- Release: October 13, 2007 – 2008

The Search for the Next Elvira is an American reality television series created by Eric Gardner and Cassandra Peterson for the Fox Reality channel. The reality competition show is a search to be the next late-night horror cult movie host Elvira, Mistress of the Dark.

== The Judges ==
- Cassandra Peterson as Elvira
- Christian Greenia as himself / "Manvira"
- Patterson Lundquist as himself / "Manvira"
- Kane Hodder - Guest judge, former portrayer of horror movie icon, Jason Voorhees.
- Rick Baker - Guest judge, six time Academy Award-winning special effects make-up artist.

== Contestants ==
The "Unlucky Thirteen" included:

- Ms. Monster (a.k.a. A.K. Smith), a San Francisco-based horror hostess.
- Yvette Nii, a singer/ entertainer based out of Honolulu, Hawaii
- Asia DeVinyl, a goth and fetish pin-up model.
- Mina Rose, a model and member of Suicide Girls.
- April Wahlin, an aspiring writer and a self-proclaimed tomboy.
- Jenny Jenson, a marketing director who is fluent in Mandarin.
- Erik-a (a.k.a. Eric Bedelman), the only male contestant to make it into the semi-finals.
- Shelly Martinez, a former ECW wrestler who performed under the stage name Ariel, and former TNA Knockout.
- Jilina Scott, an actress and television hostess.
- Lady M (a.k.a. Milli), a former Ringling Bros. showgirl, trained Ringling clown, former Las Vegas magician's assistant, and former Peanuts characters and singer at Knott's Berry Farm's Camp Snoopy Theater.
- Kitty Korvette, bassist of the Texas-based goth country band Black Molly.
- Bridget Marquardt, a Playboy model and one of the stars of the reality show The Girls Next Door.
- Lola Davidson, an actress.

=== Elimination order ===
Call-out and elimination order
#	1	2	3	4
01	Lola	Monster	Monster	Kitty
02	Yvette	Yvette	Jilina	April
03	Amanda	Asia	Kitty	Jenny
04	Jill	Mina	Jenny	
05	Shelly	April	April	
06	Anabelle	Jenny	Bridget	
07	Bridget	Erik-a		
08	Kitty	Shelly		
09	Mischief	Jilina		
10	Jenny	Lady M		
11	Savage	Kitty		
12	April	Bridget		
13	Cecily	Lola		
14	Mina			
15	Monster			
16	Lady M			
17	Jilina			
18	Erik-a			
19	Connie			
20	Asia			

The contestant was saved and continued into the next round.
The contestant was eliminated and “vanquished”.
The contestant was initially saved by the judges, but eliminated by the other contestants.
This contestant was chosen to be the next Elvira.
