= Kevin Thorn =

American professional wrestler

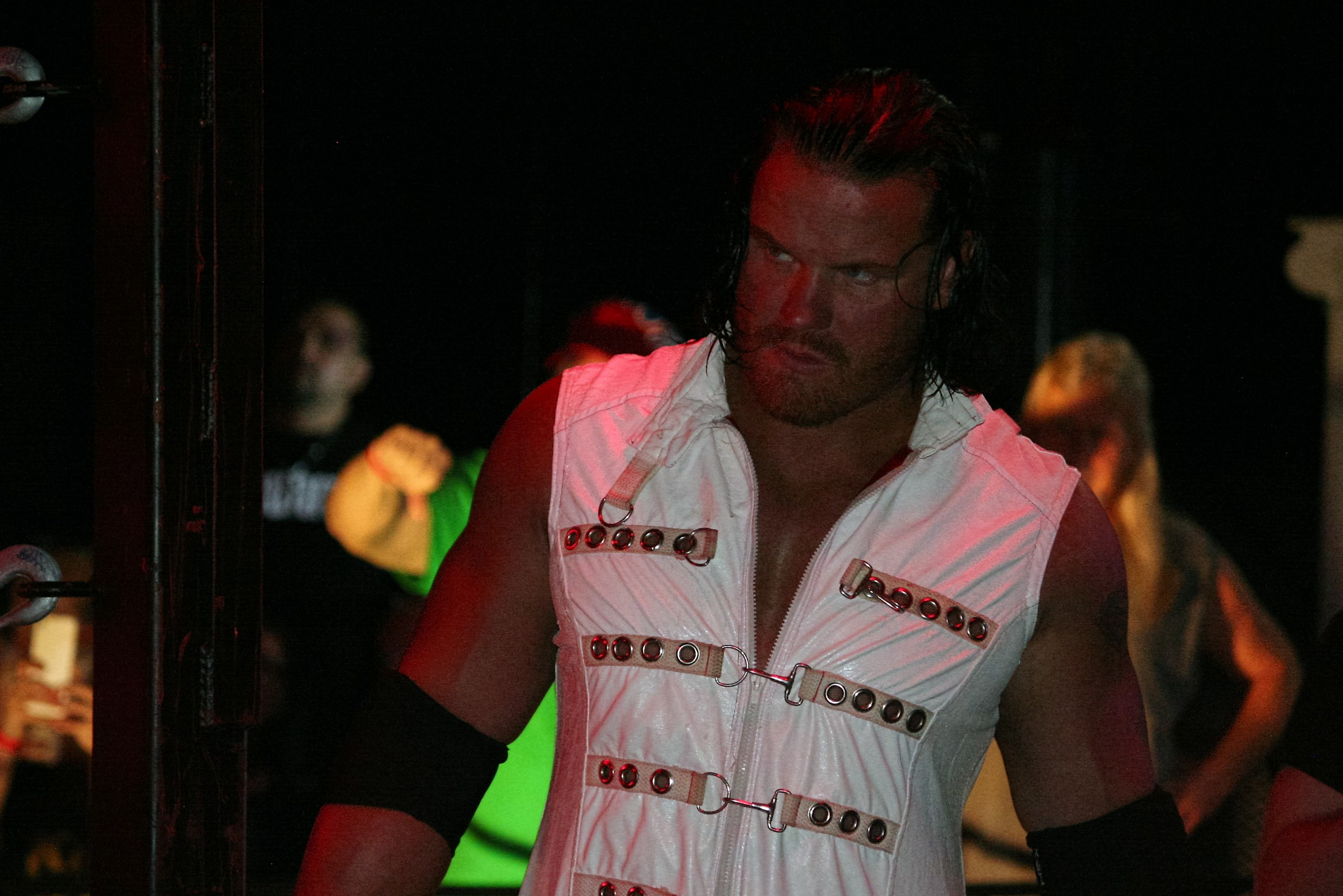
- Thorn in 2016

Personal information
- Born: Kevin Matthew Fertig; January 17, 1977 (age 49) Memphis, Tennessee, U.S.

Professional wrestling career
- Ring name(s): 7even Kevin Fertig; Kevin Thorn; Max Cherry; Mordecai; Serpent; Seven Thorn; Vengeance
- Billed height: 6 ft 3 in (191 cm)
- Billed weight: 270 lb (122 kg)
- Trained by: Ohio Valley Wrestling
- Debut: 2000

Kevin Matthew Fertig (born January 17, 1977) is an American professional wrestler. He is best known for working with WWE under the ring names Mordecai and Kevin Thorn.

Fertig made his professional wrestling debut in 2000, and quickly began working for the Memphis Championship Wrestling promotion in his hometown, under the ring name Seven. There he won the Hardcore, Southern Tag Team and Southern Heavyweight Championships. He signed a contract with WWE in April 2002, and was assigned to their developmental territory, Ohio Valley Wrestling (OVW). He competed in OVW for two years, winning the OVW Southern Tag Team Championship with Travis Bane, before being called up to the SmackDown brand as Mordecai, a religious zealot. The character only lasted a few months, and he returned to OVW before being released in mid-2005.

He competed on the independent circuit for the next year, before returning to WWE to wrestle on its ECW brand as Kevin Thorn, a vampire character. He gained Ariel as a valet, and later joined the New Breed faction in early 2007. After Ariel was released in mid-2007, Thorn continued to wrestle on ECW, but was sent to OVW in late 2007, after undergoing an image change. He wrestled in both OVW and WWE's other developmental territory, Florida Championship Wrestling, until January 2009, when he was released from his contract. He then returned to the independent circuit, and also wrestled in Europe as Seven Thorn.

== Professional wrestling career ==
=== Early Career (2000–2002) ===
Fertig first got involved in professional wrestling by working out with wrestler Sid Vicious in Gold's Gym in Memphis. Beginning his career in 2000, Fertig quickly began wrestling as Seven in Memphis Championship Wrestling and some other independent promotions. Seven was a gimmick based on the seven deadly sins. He won the MCW Southern Heavyweight Championship on July 7, 2001. He also won the MCW Southern Tag Team Championship with Thrash, and held the MCW Hardcore Championship.

=== World Wrestling Federation/Entertainment (2002–2005) ===
==== Ohio Valley Wrestling (2002−2004) ====
In April 2002, Fertig signed a developmental deal with World Wrestling Federation (WWF) and was assigned to their development territory Ohio Valley Wrestling (OVW), where he continued to use the Seven gimmick. After wrestling sporadically in OVW throughout 2002 and 2003, against wrestlers including Chris Cage and Johnny Jeter, he joined the Disciples of Synn stable. Along with stable-mate Travis Bane, he won the OVW Southern Tag Team Championship on March 5, 2003, by defeating Lance Cade and René Duprée. After holding the championship for just over a month, they were forced to vacate it on April 10, when Bane suffered an injury. In late 2003 and early 2004, Seven and Bane began competing in dark matches prior to the Raw television show, using their real names of Kevin Fertig and Travis Tomko respectively.

==== Mordecai (2004) ====
In 2004, Fertig pitched the idea of a religious character named Mordecai to Vince McMahon. In late April 2004, Fertig was called up to the SmackDown! brand with vignettes playing on the show announcing his new character, Mordecai, a religious Zealot-type character, which was partially based on his previous Seven gimmick. During numerous promos, Mordecai claimed to be on a crusade to rid the world of sin. He consistently wore white and had blonde hair and a beard as a sign of his purity. Mordecai debuted in-ring for the SmackDown! brand on May 16, 2004, during the Judgment Day pay-per-view, defeating Scotty 2 Hotty. In later appearances, Mordecai condemned the audience for their sins, and led them in prayer. At The Great American Bash, Mordecai defeated Hardcore Holly. On the July 1 episode of SmackDown!, Mordecai lost to Rey Mysterio. In early July, however, the gimmick was dropped and Fertig was sent back to OVW for more training.

==== Return to OVW and departure (2004−2005) ====
Fertig's return to OVW was also due to his involvement in a bar fight, and subsequent impending lawsuits meant that WWE decided to take Fertig off television. Fertig returned to OVW, wrestling under a mask as Vengeance, and competed only sporadically against wrestlers including Elijah Burke, Mark Henry, Johnny Jeter, and Matt Cappotelli. He was soon released in July 2005.

=== Independent circuit (2005–2006) ===
Following his WWE release, Fertig began using the Mordecai name again while working on the independent circuit. He wrestled for Memphis Wrestling, where he won the Southern Title in March 2005. He went on to retain the championship in a match against Garrison Cade on April 16. He also worked for UCW, and wrestled against competitors including Marty Jannetty and Shayne Maddox.

=== Return to WWE (2006–2009) ===
==== ECW (2006–2007) ====
Fertig made his return in June 2006 on WWE's ECW brand as a vampire. His first appearances on ECW on Sci Fi saw him appear in several vignettes, looking into the camera and spitting blood, while remaining unnamed and unofficially known as the "ECW Vampire". The idea behind the vignettes was that Fertig was to be part of a 'vampire' faction with Gangrel and Ariel; however, the faction did not materialise on television. The vignettes later expanded to include Ariel as a tarot card reader.

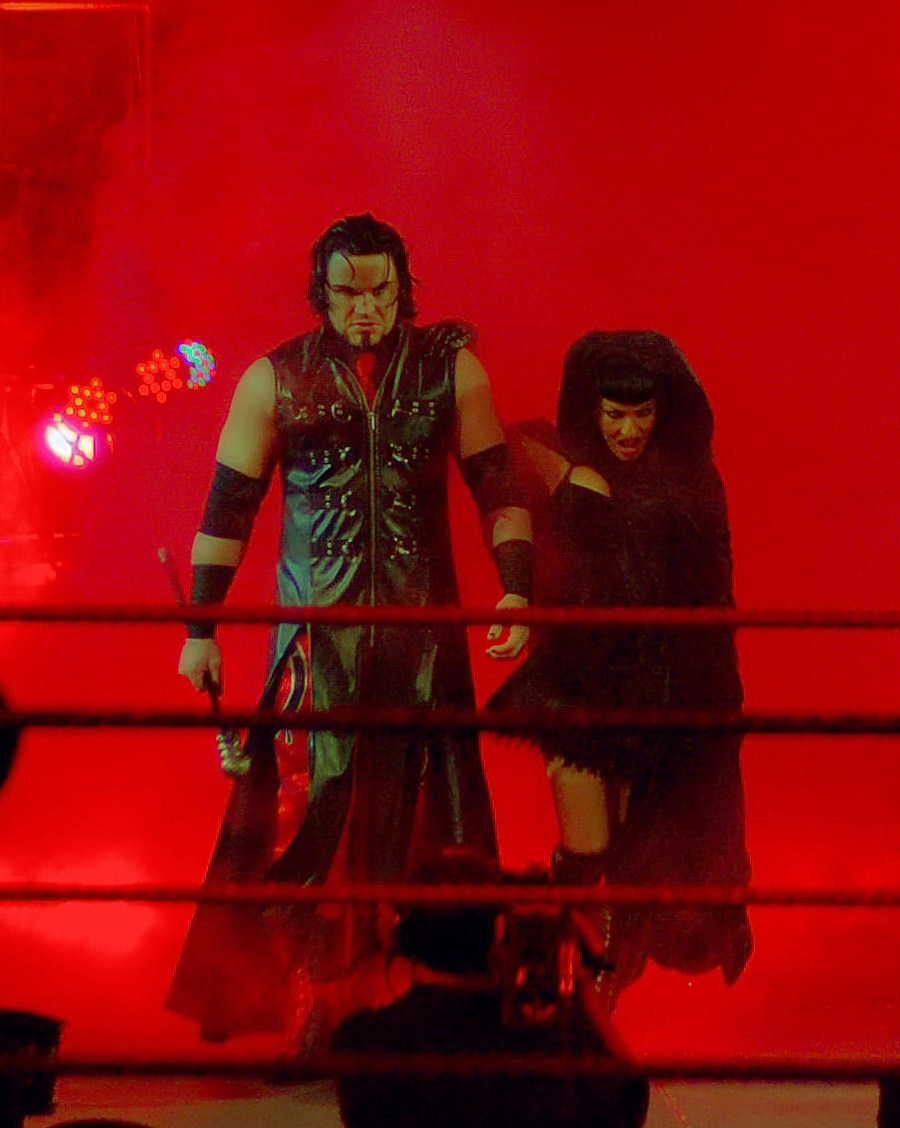
Kevin Thorn and Ariel in 2006

Fertig's televised in-ring debut for the brand on the July 25 episode of ECW on Sci Fi, defeating Little Guido Maritato, with Ariel acting as his valet. The next week, in another vignette, Ariel revealed his name to be Kevin Thorn. Ariel then increased her ringside presence during Thorn's matches, often interfering in his matches, and Thorn began a scripted feud with Balls Mahoney. In order to counteract Ariel's interference, Mahoney began bringing in Francine as an equalizer. The two teams feuded until early October, until Francine was released by WWE. As Ariel began to feud with Kelly Kelly, Thorn became caught up in the feud and at the December to Dismember pay-per-view, Thorn and Ariel defeated Kelly and Kelly's on-screen boyfriend Mike Knox in a mixed tag team match, after Knox walked out on Kelly.

On February 6, 2007, Thorn and Ariel joined Elijah Burke, Matt Striker, and Marcus Cor Von in forming The New Breed stable, with Thorn taking on the enforcer role and describing himself as the "muscle" of the group. The New Breed immediately engaged themselves in a feud with the ECW Originals (Rob Van Dam, Tommy Dreamer, Sabu and The Sandman). Different members of the New Breeds wrestled members of the ECW originals over several weeks, leading up to WrestleMania 23. At WrestleMania, the New Breed was defeated by the ECW Originals in an 8-man tag team match, but won a rematch on the following episode of ECW. In April, CM Punk aligned himself with the New Breed after weeks of recruiting. Just two weeks later, however, Punk betrayed the New Breed and attacked Burke after a match. The following week, Burke announced a match between Thorn and Punk, but Thorn lost. After the match, Thorn quit the New Breed, as none of the other members interfered during the match to help him.

On May 18, Ariel was released by WWE. The following week, Thorn appeared by himself, with the commentators claiming that Thorn was "flying solo". After leaving Ariel, Thorn was pushed, defeating superstars such as Tommy Dreamer and Stevie Richards. His winning streak came to an end on July 3, however, when he lost to CM Punk on ECW. Thorn then began a feud with Stevie Richards, after Richards defeated Thorn in an upset on two consecutive occasions. Following this, Thorn attacked Richards backstage. He later pinned Richards in a match, but the referee reversed the decision, and awarded the match to Richards, when Thorn attacked Richards after the match. Despite this, Thorn defeated Richards the following week, and then teamed up with Elijah Burke to defeat Richards and Tommy Dreamer in a tag team match. On the September 18 episode of ECW, Thorn along with Burke, Dreamer, and Richards involved themselves in an Elimination Chase to No Mercy to face Punk. In their first match, a fatal four-way, Thorn was victorious, eliminating Richards, but was eliminated himself the following week, due to being pinned in a triple threat match.

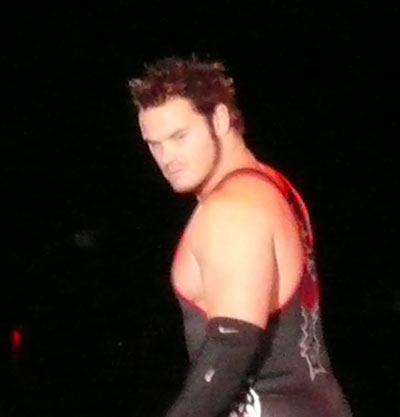
Thorn's new look in December 2007

On November 20, 2007, Thorn debuted a new look, with shorter hair and different ring attire, while defeating Nunzio. Soon after this image change, Thorn was taken off of television and sent to the WWE developmental territory, Ohio Valley Wrestling.

==== Developmental territories (2008–2009) ====
In early 2008, Fertig made his return to Ohio Valley Wrestling (OVW), and began wrestling under his real name. He competed against wrestlers including Pat Buck, J.D. Michaels, and Kofi Kingston. In mid-2008, Fertig moved to the new developmental territory, Florida Championship Wrestling (FCW), and reverted to the Kevin Thorn name. His first match in FCW was on May 3, when he defeated Afa Anoa'i Jr. in a Street Fight. On May 6, he teamed up with Atlas DaBone to defeat Afa Jr. and "The Upgrade" Tyrone Jones. His first loss in FCW was on June 3, when he was defeated by Shawn Spears, following a distraction from Sinn Bowdee.

Fertig was part of plans for a faction to feud with The Undertaker in mid-2008, however, he underwent hip surgery in September, and the plans did not proceed. He competed in his final match in FCW on December 4, when he, Sheamus, and Gavin Spears were defeated by Joe Hennig, Johnny Prime, and Eric Escobar in a six-man elimination match. In January 2009, he was offered a new contract with WWE, but turned it down. As a result, WWE announced that he had been released from his contract by request on January 9, although his contract did not technically end until April 5, preventing him from wrestling for other promotions.

=== Return to Independent circuit (2009–2011, 2015–present) ===
Following his release from WWE, Fertig toured Europe, and stated he was considering working in Mexico and Puerto Rico. He has been using the Kevin Thorn vampire gimmick, in various independent promotions, such as One Pro Wrestling and Dynamic Pro Wrestling, and has also wrestled as Seven Thorn. At the September 1, 2009, tapings of Total Nonstop Action Wrestling's Impact! television show Fertig wrestled in a dark match under the ring name Serpent, losing to Kip James.

Fertig appeared at German Stampede Wrestling shows in September 2010 as Seven Thorn. He wrestles for Frontier Elite Wrestling as 'Kevin Thorn', and won the FEW Heavyweight Championship. In 2011, he took a hiatus from wrestling.

In 2015, he returned to wrestling.

Fertig made an appearance for All Elite Wrestling (AEW) on the December 2, 2022 episode of Rampage, serving as a lumberjack during the show's lumberjack match.

== Personal life ==
Fertig married his wife in September 2005. The couple has a son and daughter. His son is committed to playing lacrosse at Robert Morris University. He also is friends with Matt and Jeff Hardy. As of 2025, Fertig is a realtor in the Indianapolis, Indiana metro area.

== Championships and accomplishments ==
- Frontier Elite Wrestling
  - FEW Heavyweight Championship (5 times)
- Memphis Championship Wrestling
  - MCW Hardcore Championship (1 time)
  - MCW Southern Heavyweight Championship (1 time)
  - MCW Southern Tag Team Championship (1 time) – with Trash
- Memphis Wrestling
  - Memphis Wrestling Southern Heavyweight Championship (2 times)
- Ohio Valley Wrestling
  - OVW Southern Tag Team Championship (1 time) – with Travis Bane
- Vanguard Championship Wrestling
  - VCW Tag Team Championship (1 time) - with Gangrel
- Wrestling Observer Newsletter
  - Worst Gimmick (2004)
