= Fox Reality Channel =

American pay television channel

- Country: United States

Ownership
- Owner: News Corporation
- Parent: Fox Entertainment Group
- Key people: David Lyle, Lorey Zlotnick, Bob Boden, David Nathanson

History
- Launched: May 24, 2005
- Closed: June 30, 2010 (5 years, 1 month and 6 days)
- Replaced by: Nat Geo Wild

Fox Reality Channel was an American pay television channel. It was launched on May 24, 2005, and was owned by the Fox Entertainment Group Fox Reality Channel was dedicated to airing reality programming 24/7 It featured many shows that were originally on the Fox network (or produced by Fox). The channel also featured reality shows syndicated from other networks (such as ABC, CBS, NBC, The CW), as well as many international shows from the United Kingdom, Australia, and New Zealand. The channel was led by reality television industry veteran, David Lyle, network programmer, Bob Boden, cable marketing executive, Lorey Zlotnick and FOX Executive, David Nathanson who oversaw business and operations.

== Shutdown, replacement and rebranding ==
In October 2009, it was announced that Fox Reality Channel would be discontinued. The channel ceased operations on most providers on March 29, 2010, when it was rebranded as the US version of Nat Geo Wild, focusing its programming on nature and wildlife documentaries. On that date, the channel's old website was taken down and redirected to its archived programming on now Disney-owned Hulu, as well as Nat Geo Wild's new site. Nat Geo Wild was launched on Dish Network on April 19, 2010. DirecTV removed Fox Reality and added Nat Geo Wild on June 30, 2010, with an automated loop of Fox Reality programming remaining until those respective launch dates on those satellite providers Nat Geo Wild at exactly 6:00am EST after a few or more infomercials.

== Programming ==
=== Original programming ===
- The Academy, provides a behind-the-scenes look at police recruits of the Los Angeles Sheriff's Academy as they go through an 18-week training course to become deputies of the County Sheriff's Department. The program premiered in May 2007, and is shared with sister broadcast network MyNetworkTV.
- American Idol Extra, The official aftershow of the immensely popular American Idol. This show includes behind-the-scenes footage and interviews with contestants who have been eliminated.
- Battle of the Bods is a reality show in which five girls rank themselves in order of attractiveness and try to match the rankings of a panel of male judges. Hosted by Olivia Lee, the program premiered January 19, 2008.
- Busted and Disgusted is an original series bringing viewers clips of the most outrageous behavior caught on camera. The show premiered on April 1, 2009.
- Camp Reality, Burton Roberts (Survivor: Pearl Islands) organizes a trip into the California woods for a number of his former reality-show friends for a series of fun contests, including water-orb races and a milk chugging contest. Friends who participated in this event included Toni Ferrari (Paradise Hotel), Rebecca Cardon (The Amazing Race 6 and Work Out), Brennan Swain (co-winner of The Amazing Race 1), Coral Smith (The Real World and several MTV Challenges), Nikki McKibbin (American Idol), Michelle Deighton (America's Next Top Model, Cycle 4), and Jon "Jonny Fairplay" Dalton.
- Corkscrewed, follows American Idol producers Ken Warwick and Nigel Lythgoe as they purchase a vineyard in Paso Robles, California, and encounter the vagaries of the wine business. The program premiered on November 30, 2006.
- "Gimme My Reality Show!" has a group of seven former celebrities compete to win their own reality show.
- Househusbands of Hollywood, follows the lives of five men who manage households in families in which their wives earn the majority of the household income. The 10-episode series premiered on Saturday, August 15, 2009.
- Long Way Down, profiles actor Ewan McGregor as he bikes through 18 countries, riding from John o' Groats in Scotland to Cape Town in South Africa.
- Rob and Amber: Against the Odds, follows the lives of reality couple Rob Mariano and Amber Mariano as Rob tries to become a professional poker player.
- My Bare Lady, gives adult film stars the opportunity to try out different careers. The program premiered on December 7, 2006.
- Paradise Hotel 2, follows a group of single men and women who live together for a period in an exclusive resort. The program premiered February 4, 2008 and was shared by MyNetworkTV.
- Seducing Cindy, follows Cindy Margolis, once the most downloaded woman on the Internet, as she searches for a new love. The program premiered on January 30, 2010, at 9:00PM Eastern/8:00PM Central.
- Solitary, turns the concept of solitary confinement into a game show. The program, which features an unseen host presiding over "treatments", or challenges, premiered on May 29, 2006.
- The Search for the Next Elvira, 13 contestants vie for the chance to become Elvira's newest 'handmaiden of the dark' in a Fox Reality Channel original series. The program premiered on October 13, 2007.
- Sex Decoy: Love Stings, set inside the private life and professional world of Sandra Hope and "Mate Check Private Investigations". Each episode chronicles specific cases in which a spouse or significant other hires Sandra and her team of decoys to "tempt" their potentially wayward lover and expose infidelity. The show also follows the ups and downs of Sandra's dysfunctional family, including her daughters and her fiance Thomas Scharrer, who work for her as decoys. The program premiered on May 23, 2009.
- Smile...You're Under Arrest!, uses elaborate sting set-ups to lure wanted-criminals out of hiding. Improvisational actors assist with the scenarios before police officers arrest the criminal. The program premiered on December 27, 2008.

=== Acquired programming sample ===
- Amazing Adventures of a Nobody
- The Amazing Race
- American Idol
- Arrest & Trial
- Average Joe
- Beauty and the Geek
- The Biggest Loser
- Blind Date
- Boot Camp
- Breaking the Magician's Code: Magic's Biggest Secrets Finally Revealed
- Celebrity Boxing
- Celebrity Mole
- Divorce Court
- Don't Forget the Lyrics!
- EX-treme Dating
- For Love or Money
- Ghosts Caught on Tape: Fact or Fiction
- Hell's Kitchen
- Judge Alex
- Kitchen Nightmares
- LAPD: Life on the Beat
- Last Comic Standing
- Looking for Love: Bachelorettes in Alaska
- Mad Mad House
- Maximum Exposure
- The Mole
- My Big Fat Obnoxious Fiance
- Outback Jack
- Punk'd
- Real Stories of the Highway Patrol
- Real TV
- The Restaurant
- Seducing Cindy
- Sexy Cam
- So You Think You Can Dance
- Street Patrol
- The Swan
- Train Wrecks
- Who Wants to Marry My Dad?
- Who's Your Daddy?

== See also ==
- Fox Reality Channel Reality Awards
- MyNetworkTV - sister network with a once mostly-reality format.
