= Amazing Adventures of a Nobody =

Reality-travel TV series (2006-2008)

- Genre: Documentary
- Created by: Leon Logothetis
- Directed by: Nicholas Dimitropoulos
- Presented by: Leon Logothetis
- Original language: English
- No. of seasons: 3
- No. of episodes: 36+

Production
- Running time: 24 minutes
- Production company: Shankly Productions

Original release
- Release: 2006 – 2008

Amazing Adventures of a Nobody is a travel docuseries that follows Leon Logothetis, the presenter and creator, across three seasons as he travels the United States, United Kingdom, and Europe on $5, £5, and €5 a day, respectively. This must cover his food, accommodation, and travel and he is required to pass checkpoints in certain cities. He cannot not stay in one place for longer than 24 hours and any remaining money from the previous day will not roll over. He also will not stay in any homeless shelters so as not to take up a bed someone else might need. Though he can work for and accept goods, he is not allowed to accept money directly.

In the United States, Logothetis starts at Times Square in New York City and finishes at the Hollywood Sign in Los Angeles. Two additional seasons followed: one in his native UK and one in Europe. In the UK, he starts from his home in West London, goes up to Scotland, then returns to London via Wales and the West Country. In Europe, he travels from the Eiffel Tower in Paris to the Red Square in Moscow.

The American season of the show was broadcast by the Discovery Channel and National Geographic, while the European season was initially aired on Dave and later repeated on Blighty. The show has also appeared on Fox Reality Channel, Sky3, Sky Travel, Life One, and Extreme Sports Channel.

In 2011, Logothetis released a book under the same name; it focused on his personal evolution during his travels.
