= Gangrel =

American professional wrestler (born 1969)

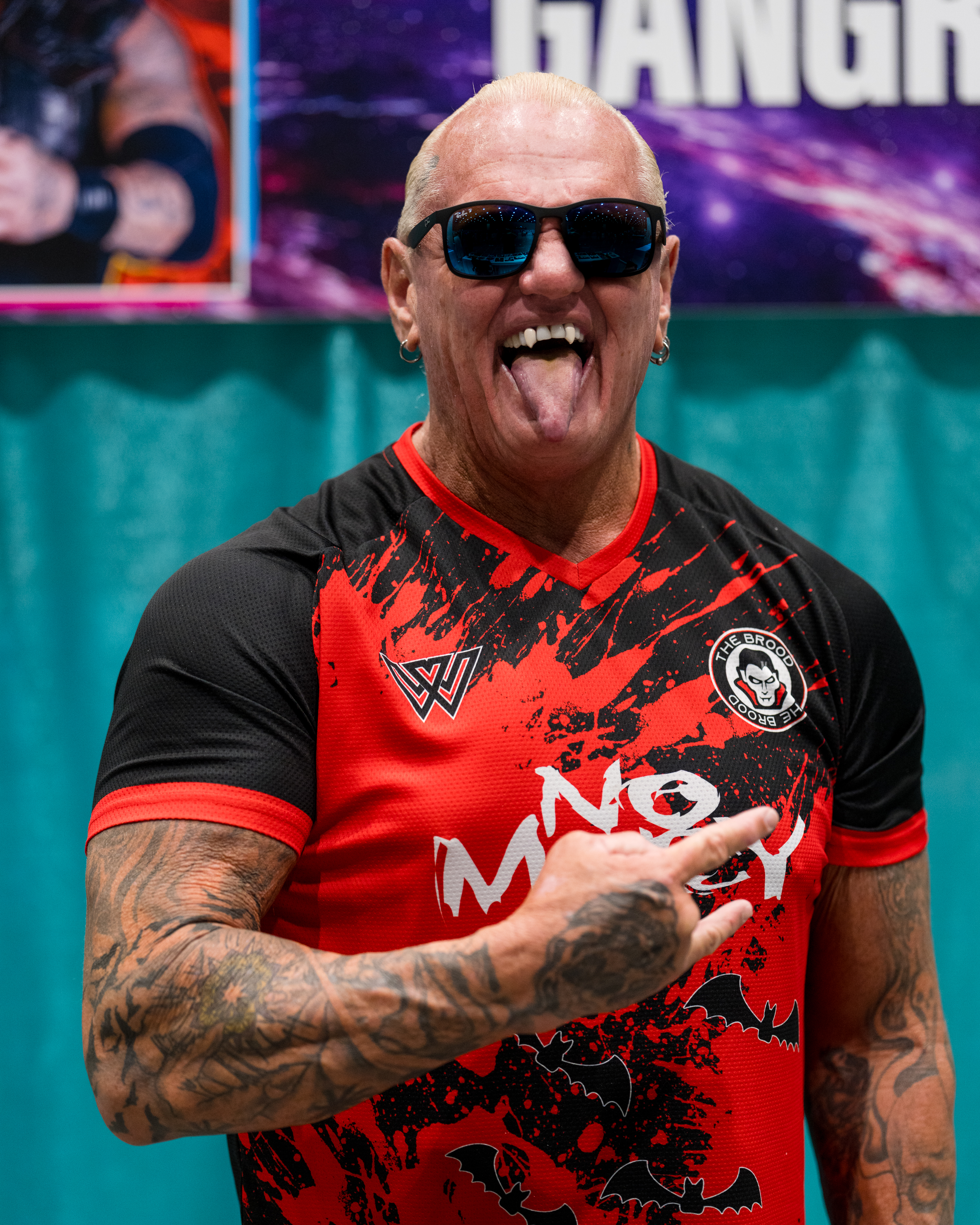
- Gangrel at GalaxyCon Oklahoma City in 2026

Personal information
- Born: David William Heath; February 16, 1969 (age 57) Fort Lauderdale, Florida, U.S.
- Spouses: Laura Buscemi (m. 1985; div. 1992) Luna Vachon (m. 1994; div. 2006) Kiara Dillon (m. 2008; div. 2013) Susan Nelson (m. 2022)
- Children: 2

Professional wrestling career
- Ring name(s): Gangrel; Vampire Warrior; Pretty Boy Dave Heath; Crazy Dave; David Heath; Blackheart Apocalypse; The Black Phantom; The Warlock; Lestat The Vampire; Vampiro Guerrero; Vampire Master
- Billed height: 6 ft 1 in (185 cm)
- Billed weight: 250 lb (113 kg)
- Billed from: "The Other Side of Darkness"; Burbank, California; Santa Cruz, California
- Trained by: Boris Malenko
- Debut: 1988

David William Heath (born February 16, 1969) is an American professional wrestler. He currently performs on the independent circuit. He is best known for his appearances in the World Wrestling Federation (WWF) from 1998 to 2001 and intermittently throughout the mid-2000s under the ring name Gangrel. He has also made appearances for All Elite Wrestling (AEW).

== Professional wrestling career ==
=== Early career (1987–1994) ===
Heath was trained by Boris Malenko in Florida. When his training was complete, he began performing in various independent professional wrestling promotions in the Florida area. In the Independent Professional Wrestling (IPW) promotion he won the IPW Tag Team Championship, before moving to Stampede Wrestling, where he formed a tag team with Tom Nash known as "The Blackhearts". Heath and Nash competed under masks as "Destruction" and "Apocalypse" respectively. They won the Stampede International Tag Team Championship as a team.

In the early nineties, the Blackhearts were paired with Nash's wife Luna, wrestling in Joel Goodhart's Tri-State Wrestling, in Herb Abrams' Universal Wrestling Federation, and finally Giant Baba's All Japan Pro Wrestling, where the team split up. During that time, the marriage between Nash and Luna broke up, and Heath and Luna became romantically involved. They eventually married on Halloween 1994. The World Wrestling Federation (WWF), where Luna worked at the time, even broadcast a segment of Luna's "Wedding to a Vampire".

After the demise of the Blackhearts, Heath and Luna developed the Vampire Warrior gimmick, inspired by the movie The Lost Boys, under which, he wrestled in various promotions, including the Memphis-based United States Wrestling Association (USWA) in 1993 to 1994. Under this moniker, he won the USWA Southern Championship and Pro Wrestling Illustrated's PWI Rookie of the Year award in 1993.

=== World Wrestling Federation (1993–1995) ===
In 1993, Heath received a try-out match with the World Wrestling Federation (WWF) when he faced Kevin Kruger in a dark match for Wrestling Challenge on June 14 in Columbus, Ohio. In late October 1993, the WWF began a Florida swing to their house show tour, and Heath made several appearances teaming with The Cuban Assassin and Little Louis in six-man matches against The Bushwhackers and Tiger Jackson.

On the February 26, 1994 episode of Superstars, Heath made his televised debut for the WWF and lost to Razor Ramon. He was portrayed as a masked heel and dubbed "The Black Phantom", working as an enhancement talent against numerous stars, including Earthquake, Razor Ramon, The 1-2-3 Kid, Lex Luger, Bob Holly, Tatanka, Davey Boy Smith, Typhoon and others. His last match was on the July 9, 1995 edition of Wrestling Challenge, where he lost to the 1-2-3 Kid once more.

=== Extreme Championship Wrestling (1995, 1997) ===
In 1995, Heath appeared in Extreme Championship Wrestling (ECW) for a short period, feuding with Tommy Dreamer over Dreamer's affiliation with Heath's real-life wife Luna. He made his debut at Barbed Wire, Hoodies & Chokeslams in June 1995.

Heath made a one-night return to ECW when he teamed with Marty Jannetty as they lost to Al Snow and Amish Roadkill on September 27, 1997.

=== Various promotions (1996–1998) ===
Heath worked in various promotions for the next two years. He worked in the independents throughout the States and mainly in Florida. He returned to USWA in 1996. Also worked in Japan for International Wrestling Association Japan from 1996 to 1997 and Puerto Rico in 1997. In 1998, he worked for All Japan Pro Wrestling.

=== World Championship Wrestling (1997–1998) ===
Throughout 1997 and early 1998, Heath appeared as enhancement talent on WCW Pro and WCW Worldwide, wrestling Chris Jericho, Rey Mysterio, Dean Malenko, and Scotty Riggs in singles matches, and in tag matches, teaming with Todd Griffith and Johnny Boone once each against Public Enemy, and with Michael Nova against the Faces of Fear.

=== Return to WWF (1998–2001) ===
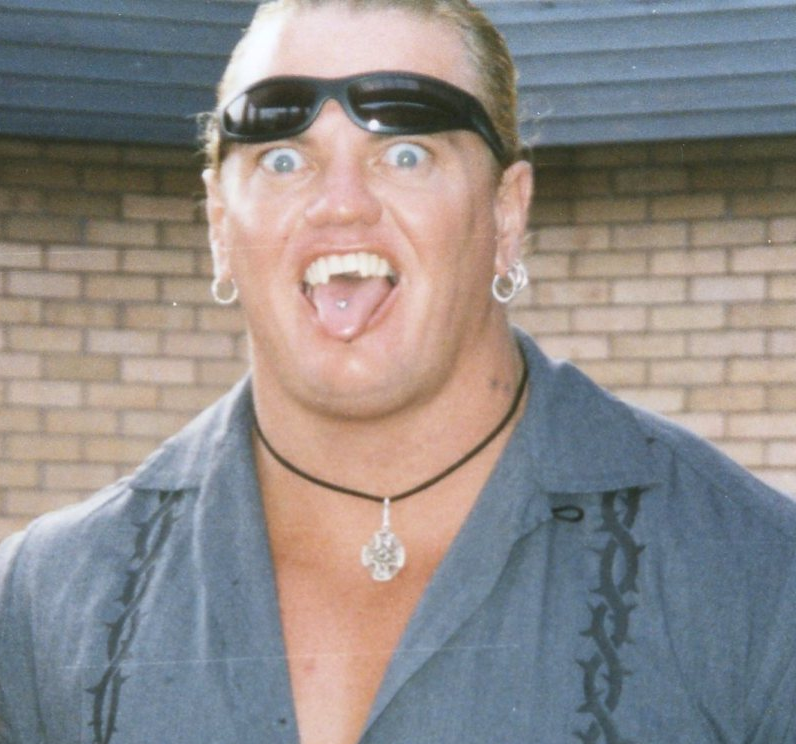
Gangrel in 1999

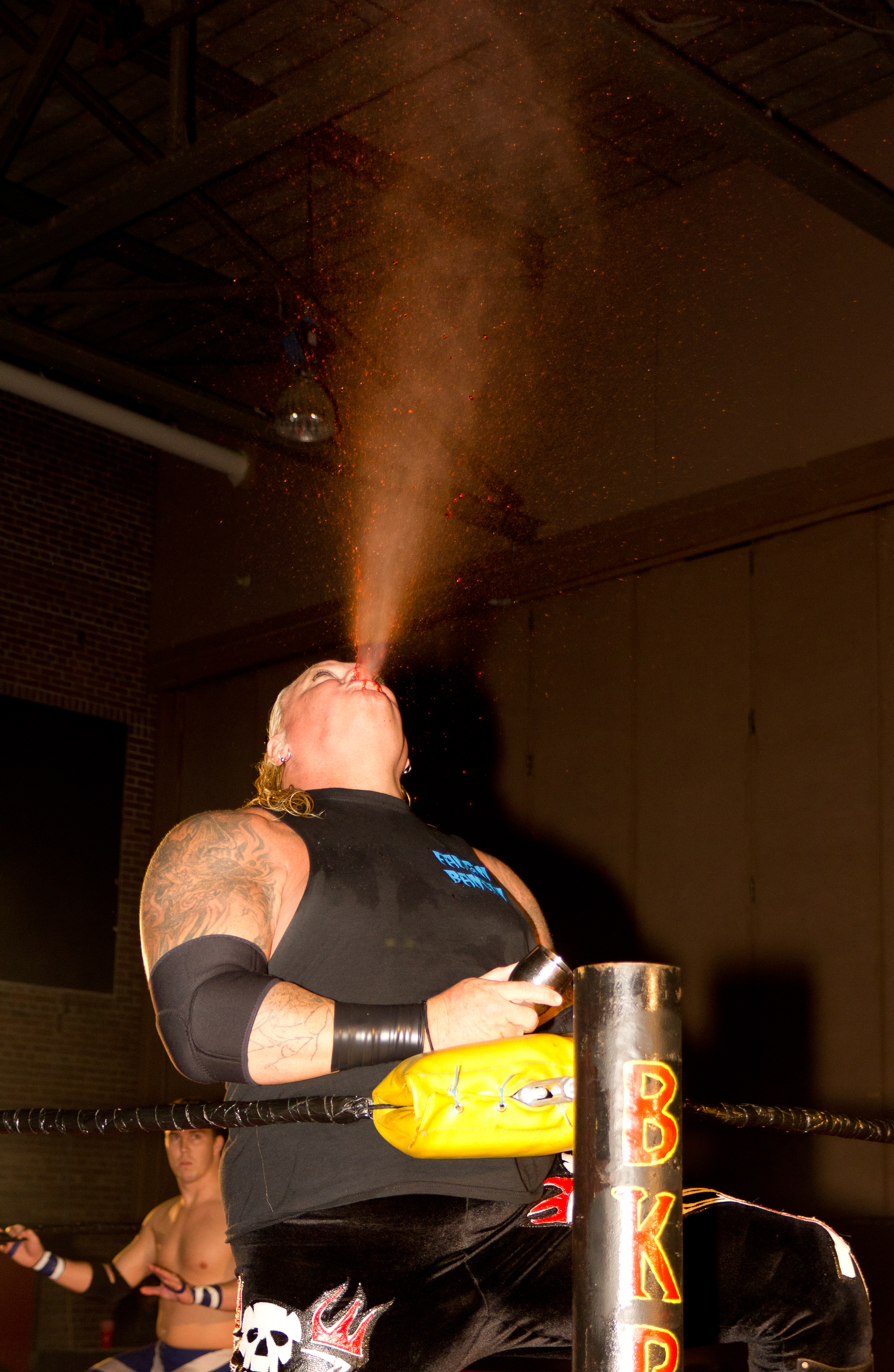
Heath played a gothic, vampiric character called "Gangrel", who spat "blood" before matches.

In 1998, Heath was hired by the World Wrestling Federation (WWF) due to the support of then writers Bruce Prichard and Vince Russo, who believed in the merit of a vampire gimmick. Heath was given the name Gangrel, which was derived from a vampire clan from the role-playing game Vampire: The Masquerade. The gimmick involved an entrance which saw him rising from a ring of fire on stage, followed by a slow walk to the ring set to a sinister instrumental music theme. He also carried a chalice of "blood" with him and, during his entrance, would stop on the ring steps, take a drink, and spit it into the air.

Gangrel made his TV debut on the August 16, 1998 episode of Sunday Night Heat, defeating Scott Taylor. He then formed a gothic faction, called The Brood, with Edge and Christian. The Brood became known for their "blood baths", which involved the lights going out for a moment, and when they came back on, the targeted wrestler being covered in blood. The three temporarily joined up with The Undertaker and his Ministry of Darkness faction.

Gangrel got one of his first title shots at the 1999 Royal Rumble. He challenged D-Generation X member X-Pac for his WWF European Championship in a losing effort. He competed in the Royal Rumble match later that night and again the following year.

After splitting from the Ministry, The Brood began a feud with the Hardy Boyz and their manager Michael Hayes. During the feud, Gangrel suddenly turned on Edge, becoming jealous of his popularity and turning heel in the process. He tried to enlist Christian, but Christian sided with Edge. He then aligned himself with the Hardy Boyz and called the group The New Brood. Terri Runnels also began to show interest in the Hardy Boyz, however, and they eventually would win Terri's services as a manager, thus dumping Gangrel.

Gangrel became a singles wrestler following the breakup of The New Brood; he was mainly used as a midcarder. In late 1999, he brought in his real-life wife Luna Vachon as his manager until she was fired. Gangrel continued working for the WWF until being taken off the main roster in November 2000 and was released in June 2001.

=== Independent circuit (2001–present) ===
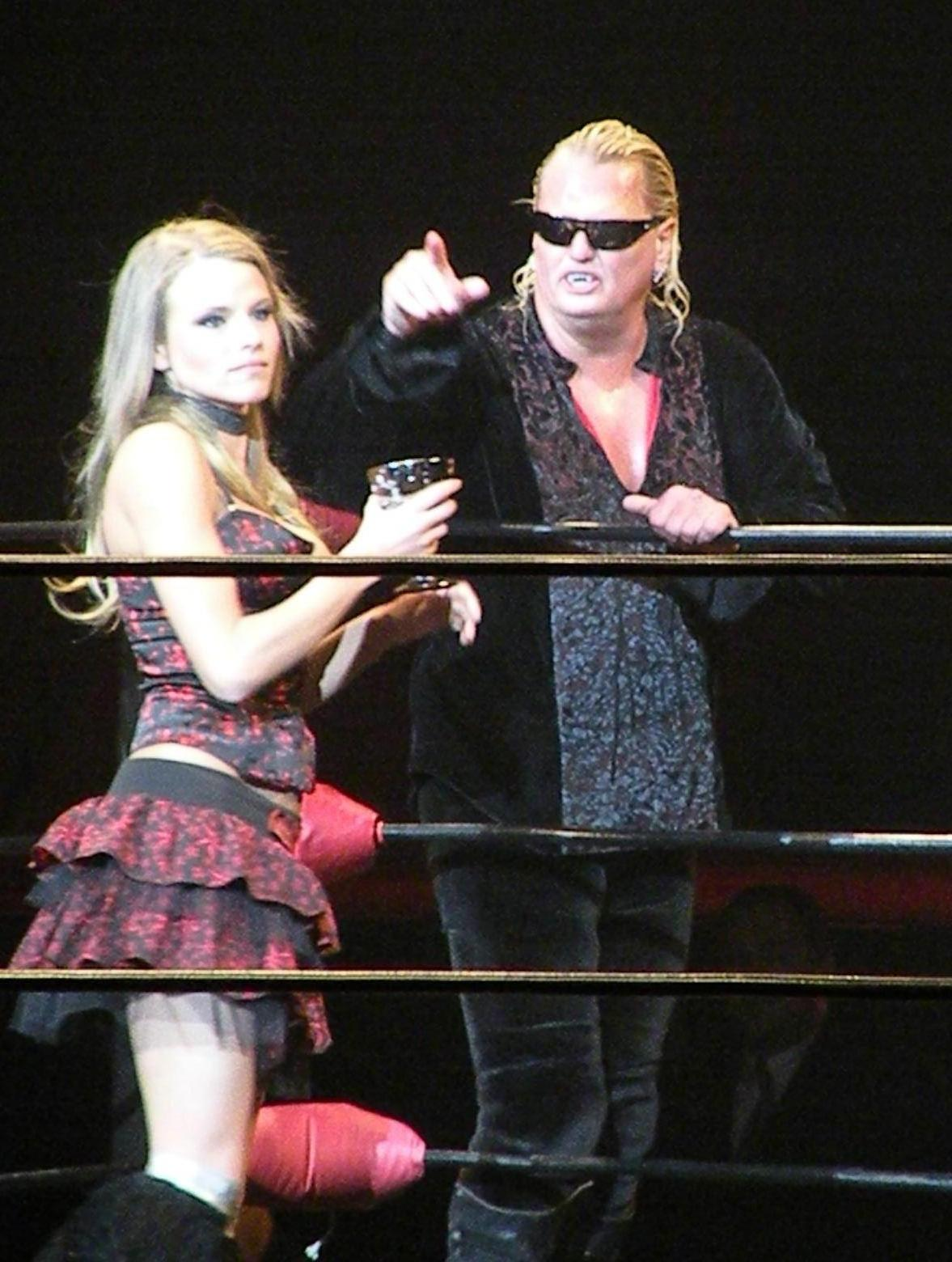
Gangrel in the ring in 2009

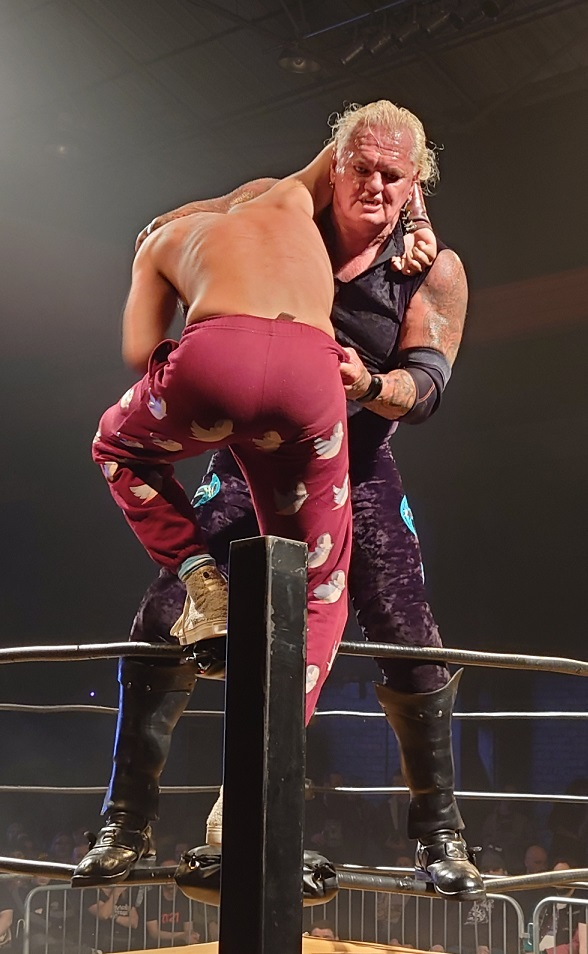
Gangrel wrestles Mad Kurt in Wolverhampton, October 2022

Heath wrestled for an independent promotion based in Cleveland, Ohio, called New Era Pro Wrestling. He competed in a casket match against NEPW, defeating Gutter.

Heath (as Vampire Warrior) wrestled for North American Wrestling (NAW). As Vampire Warrior, he wrestled in the main event of the ICWA's Show Revolution 5, losing to Joe Legend in a casket match for the NWA ICWA France Heavyweight Championship.

In 2009, he was involved with the Hulkamania Australian Tour event in Melbourne, Australia. Teaming up with Black Pearl, he lost to The Nasty Boys in an Australian Street Fight. He has also wrestled for Vendetta Pro Wrestling, All Star Wrestling, Territory League, and Busted Knuckle Pro Wrestling.

On January 23, 2010, Gangrel was inducted into the Legends Pro Wrestling "Hall of Fame" by Jack Blaze in Wheeling, West Virginia, at their annual "LPW Over The Edge" event. On May 11 and 12, 2013, he participated in California-based Alpha Omega Wrestling's two-day "Pride of the Ring II" supercard in Indio, California. He was defeated in a four-man elimination match the first day and lost an AOW Heavyweight Championship match to Eric Watts on the second.

On May 18, 2013, Gangrel made his debut for Chikara, managing The Day Walkers (Alexandre Barnabus Castle and Mathias Cage) to the second round of the 2013 Tag World Grand Prix.

In August 2013, Gangrel toured Saskatchewan, Canada, with High Impact Wrestling Canada as part of the "Blood Wars" Tour.

On June 6, 2014, at House of Hardcore 4, Gangrel teamed with Joe Caldo and Hurricane Helms to defeat Vik Dalishus, Bill Carr, and Cerebus in a six-man tag team match. On June 7, at House of Hardcore 5, Gangrel teamed with Cerebus and Fungus to defeat Dalishus, Carr and Dan Barry in a six-man tag team match. On June 14, at House of Hardcore 6, Gangrel teamed with Matt Striker to face Rikishi and X-Pac in a losing effort.

In 2013 and 2014, Gangrel appeared with the West Coast Wrestling Connection based in Portland and Salem, Oregon. In 2015, Gangrel appeared for Big Time Wrestling events in Vermont, Maine, and Virginia. He also was a featured competitor for the Las Vegas-based Paragon Pro Wrestling.

On July 18, 2015, in Kitchener, Ontario, Gangrel won the Pure Wrestling Association Ontario championship, defeating EZE Eric Cairnie. He lost the championship the next day to "Reckless" Ryan Swift.

On February 14, 2016, Gangrel appeared for Professional Wrestling Live in Solihull, West Midlands, UK at Kingshurst Labour Club and became the PWL Heavyweight Champion. Gangrel successfully defended this title on two occasions, but was defeated by local wrestler Johnny Thunder on February 25, 2016. After initially defeating Thunder, a sneak attack enabled Thunder to cash in a guaranteed title match contract he held from a previous Money in the Bank match win.

Gangrel appeared at Over the Top Wrestling's Eighth Year Anniversary show at The Hangar in Wolverhampton, England on October 28, 2022, where he defeated Mad Kurt.

=== Sporadic WWE appearances (2004–2007) ===
Gangrel reunited with former Ministry of Darkness member Viscera in 2004, returning as a hired goon of John "Bradshaw" Layfield during a feud with The Undertaker. They were defeated by The Undertaker on the September 23 episode of SmackDown. Heath was rehired in June 2005 but was sent to developmental on Ohio Valley Wrestling before being fired two months later. He returned to WWE in 2006 and assigned to their ECW roster to team up with Kevin Thorn. After management was unhappy with Heath's shape, they immediately moved him to their Deep South Wrestling developmental program before even debuting. After wrestling 12 matches in his real name, he was fired on January 18, 2007. On the 15th Anniversary of RAW special on December 10, 2007, Gangrel participated in a 15-man battle royal, but was eliminated by Al Snow.

=== All Elite Wrestling (2020, 2022, 2024) ===
On November 7, 2020, Gangrel made his debut for All Elite Wrestling (AEW) at Full Gear during the Elite Deletion match between Matt Hardy and Sammy Guevara, chastising Hardy for his disloyalty when Gangrel mentored him (referring to his time in the New Brood) before making an unsuccessful attempt to aid Guevara. 18 months later, on the May 27, 2022 episode of Rampage, Gangrel would return to AEW to accompany The Young Bucks to ring during a tag team match they had with Jon Cruz and Taylor Rust. Following the match, which saw the Young Bucks victorious, Gangrel was betrayed by The Young Bucks, who attacked him. He would then be rescued by The Hardy Boyz, who he then reunited with and assisted him in attacking Brandon Cutler.

On May 26, 2024 at Double or Nothing, he emerged from beneath the mat to assist former Brood stablemate Adam Copeland in fighting off the House of Black during Copeland's barbed wire steel cage match with Malakai Black.

== Other media ==
In May 2015, Heath appeared uncredited as a prisoner with Crohn's disease in The Human Centipede 3 (Final Sequence), starring Dieter Laser and Laurence R. Harvey. He appeared on the 10th episode of the WWE Network series, The Edge & Christian Show, released on May 2, 2016. Also in 2015, he was in a music video for rapper SonReal, on the song "For the Town".

In 2024, Heath starred in the film The After Dark as leader of the old world vampires.

== Video games ==
WWE video games
Year	Title	Notes
1999	WWF Attitude	Video game debut
1999	WWF WrestleMania 2000	
2000	WWF SmackDown!	
2000	WWF SmackDown! 2: Know Your Role	
2012	WWE '13	DLC Character

== Personal life ==
Heath has two children with his high school sweetheart Laura Buscemi. He has been married three times - first to fellow wrestler Luna Vachon from 1994 to 2006 (during which he was stepfather to Luna's sons from her previous marriage), then to Kiara Dillon from 2008 to 2014, and lastly, to Susan Nelson in February 2022.

== Championships and accomplishments ==
- Adrenaline Championship Wrestling
  - ACW Tag Team Championship (2 times) - with Kindred
- All Pro Wrestling
  - APW Tag Team Championship (1 time) – with Billy Blade
- American Wrestling Federation
  - AWF World Championship (1 time)
  - AWF Television Championship (1 time)
- Americas Wrestling Federation (Puerto Rico)
  - AWF World Junior Heavyweight Championship (1 time)
  - AWF International Heavyweight Championship (1 time)
- All-Star Wrestling (Canada)
  - ASW Trans-Canada Heavyweight Championship (3 times)
- All Star Wrestling (U.K.)
  - ASW World Tag Team Championship (1 time) – with Brody Steele
- Atlantic Wrestling Council
  - AWC Heavyweight Championship (1 time)
- Boca Raton Championship Wrestling
  - BRCW Tag Team Championship (1 time) – with Lakay
- Coastal Championship Wrestling
  - CCW World Heavyweight Championship (1 time)
- European Wrestling Promotion
  - EWP World Heavyweight Championship (1 time)
  - EWP Ironman Title Hardcore Knockout Tournament (2003)
- Hoodslam
  - Hoodslam Golden Gig Championship (1 time)
- International Pro Wrestling Association
  - IPWA Tag Team Championship (2 times) – with Rusty Brooks
- Legends Pro Wrestling
  - LPW Hall of Fame (Class of 2010)
- Maximum Pro Wrestling
  - MXPW Heavyweight Championship (1 time)
  - MXPW Tag Team Championship (1 time, inaugural) – with Dave Johnson
  - MXPW Tag Team Title Tournament (2003) – with Dave Johnson
- NWA Florida
  - NWA Florida Heavyweight Championship (1 time)
  - NWA Florida Tag Team Championship (1 time) – with Tom Nash
- National Wrestling League
  - NWL Heavyweight Championship (1 time)
- Oceania Pro Wrestling
  - OPW Tag Team Championship (1 time) - with Dusk
- Paragon Pro Wrestling
  - PPW American Championship (1 time)
- Pro Wrestling Illustrated
  - Rookie of the Year (1993)
  - Ranked No. 102 of the top 500 wrestlers in the PWI 500 in 1999
  - Ranked No. 437 of the top 500 wrestlers in the PWI 500 in 2026
- Pro Wrestling live
  - PWL Heavyweight Championship (1 time)
  - PWL Great British Championship (1 time)
  - PWL Tag Team Championship (1 time)– with Mad Dog Maxx
- Pro Wrestling Revolution
  - PWR Heavyweight Championship (1 time)
- Pure Wrestling Association
  - PWA Ontario Championship (1 time)
- Stampede Wrestling
  - Stampede International Tag Team Championship (1 time) – with Tom Nash
- SWF UK & KAPOW Wrestling
  - SWF & KAPOW Tag Team Championship (1 time) - with TWitcH
- Tri-State Wrestling Alliance
  - TWA Tag Team Championship (1 time) – with Blackheart Destruction
- United States Wrestling Association
  - USWA Southern Heavyweight Championship (1 time)
- Vanguard Championship Wrestling
  - VCW Heavyweight Championship (1 time)
  - VCW Tag Team Championship (1 time) - with Kevin Thorn
- West Coast Wrestling Connection
  - WCWC Pacific Northwest Championship (3 times)
  - WCWC Legacy Championship (3 times)
  - WCWC Tag Team Championship (3 times) – with Mikey O'Shea (1) and Sinn Bodhi (2)
