= Lucifer (wrestler) =

American professional wrestler (1960 – 2011)

- Burke and co-MEWF Tag Team Champion "Hollywood" Bob Starr (left) as the "Hollywood Hunks" in 1994.

Personal information
- Born: Timothy James Burke; October 1, 1960 Baltimore, Maryland, United States
- Died: June 21, 2011 (aged 50) Baltimore, Maryland

Professional wrestling career
- Ring name(s): Lucifer; Mr. Lucifer; Lucifer the Knight of the Road
- Billed height: 6 ft 3 in (1.91 m)
- Billed weight: 280 lb (130 kg)
- Billed from: Daytona Beach, Florida
- Trained by: Bob Starr
- Debut: August 2, 1991
- Retired: 2004

Timothy James "Tim" Burke (October 1, 1960 – June 21, 2011), known by his ring name Lucifer, was an American professional wrestler, trainer and promoter who competed in numerous East Coast and Mid-Atlantic independent promotions during the 1990s and early 2000s; among the promotions he appeared in included the Atlantic Wrestling Federation, East Coast Wrestling Association, Cueball Carmichael's Independent Professional Wrestling Alliance, Long Island Wrestling Federation, New Jack City Wrestling, Regional Championship Wrestling, United Independent Wrestling, and the Wrestling Independent Network.

As co-founder of the Mid-Eastern Wrestling Federation with promoter Dennis Wipprecht, Burke was a major figure in Maryland professional wrestling during the 1990s. He not only brought in stars from Extreme Championship Wrestling, World Championship Wrestling and the World Wrestling Federation to the area but gave many future independent stars their first big break in the business. His "Brain Buster's Pro Wrestling Academy", the MEWF's official training facility, produced many of these wrestlers, most notably, Ruckus and Tonya Stevens.

Burke went into semi-retirement after the MEWF folded in 2004, partially due to his declining health, and spent his final years in Maryland Championship Wrestling until his death from cancer six years later. He wrestled his final match at MCW's "Legends of Maryland" show against the Cat Burglar on November 7, 2009, and where he was inducted into the MCW Hall of Fame. The company, which competed against the MEWF in a bitter 5-year rivalry, acknowledged Burke and Wipprecht's role in developing "indy wrestling" on the East Coast and "had it not been for these two men there may not be wrestling in Maryland today".

== Career ==
=== Early career and the Mid-Eastern Wrestling Federation (1991–1992) ===
Timothy James Burke was born in Baltimore, Maryland, on October 1, 1960, to Eleanora and William M. Burke. He was trained by Bob Starr who later helped he and promoter Dennis Wipprecht establish the Mid-Eastern Wrestling Federation, then one of the first independent promotions in Maryland. He made his pro debut as "Lucifer" on its first show held in Pasadena, Maryland on August 2, 1991. One of his earliest opponents during the MEWF's first year was Rasta the Voodoo Mon. The MEWF would eventually become of top independent promotions on the Eastern seaboard during the 1990s. Burke also wrestled for other promotions while running the MEWF, using variations of his "Lucifer" ring name "Mr. Lucifer" and "Lucifer, the Knight of the Road", including the Atlantic Wrestling Federation and the Wrestling Independent Network. While working for promoter Steve Unterman, Burke was involved in several of WIN's charity events, most notably, wrestling Cream Team (Rip "Rest In Piece" Sawyer and "Diamond" Dave Casanova) with Morgus The Maniac at the Preakness Festival in Highlandtown, Baltimore on May 16, and Ivan Koloff for the Ronald McDonald House at Martin's North Point on November 15, 1992.

He and Wipprecht participated in fundraisers for their own promotion as well. Five days after the Ronald McDonald House benefit show, the Mid-Eastern Wrestling Federation held a fundraiser for North Carroll High School in the school's gymnasium with the proceeds going towards the purchasing of computer software. The main event saw The Honky Tonk Man wrestle Max Thrasher and featured appearances from "Hot Stuff" Eddie Gilbert, A. C. Golden, Morgus the Maniac, Rusty "The Fox" Thomas, MEWF Woman's Champion Heidi Lee Morgan, midget wrestlers Haiti Kid and Butch Cassidy, and the Cream Team. Also on the card, AWF Heavyweight Champion Kirk Dredd defended his title against Axl Rotten. Burke himself wrestled Bob Starr in a stretcher match. Though still a fledgling promotion, which used a 1/3 the budget of its rivals, it eventually outlasted both the United Independent Wrestling and WIN to become the sole remaining promotion in the region.

=== Mid-Eastern Wrestling Federation (1993–1997) ===
After two years in the MEWF, Burke won the MEWF Heavyweight Championship from Max Thrasher on February 5, 1993, in Gaithersburg, Maryland. It was also around this time that Burke formed the "Hollywood Hunks" with Bob Starr. In August, they won the ECWA Tag Team Championship while touring the Mid-Atlantic "indy circuit" which they would hold until their eventual defeat by Ace Darling & Kid Flash two years later. They also briefly held the MEWF Tag Team Championship, defeating The Goodfellows (Romeo Valentino & Dino Casanova), before dropping the belts to Road Warrior Hawk and Ultimate Comet in Catonsville on November 11, 1994. Two days later, Burke's lost the heavyweight title to Morgus the Maniac in Hampstead ending his first championship reign after nine months. He regained it the following night in a no-disqualification match at Kenwood High School in Essex, and successfully defended it against Doink the Clown among others, before finally losing the title back to Morgus in Baltimore on May 13, 1994.

On March 26, 1995, Burke attempted to win the MEWF Mid-Atlantic Heavyweight Championship from The Ultimate Comet. In spite of outside interference from Burke's then manager "Stud" Lee Osborne and bodyguard The Freak of Nature, he ended up being pinned by the champion. Months later at the MEWF's annual benefit show for North Carroll High School, Burke officiated a "bunkhouse match" between The Ultimate Comet, now wrestling as Corporal Punishment, and Morgus The Maniac for the MEWF Heavyweight Championship. At the end of the year, he began teaming with the Cat Burglar and the two defeated The Bad Crew for the tag team titles on December 3. Burke made two appearances at the Good Sports Arena in Aberdeen, New Jersey for New Jack City Pro Wrestling and the Garden State Wrestling Alliance. On December 18, 1995, he wrestled Steve Richards, Inferno Kid, and The Juggernaut in a 6-man tag team elimination match with The Dream Team which lasted 34 minutes. He and the Cat Burglar continued defending the belts until February 25, 1996, when Burke was abandoned by his partner in a title defense against Darkside (Glen Osbourne and Rockin' Rebel) and forced to defend the championship in a handicap match which he lost. He subsequently feuded with Cat Burglar as well as Bob Starr on MEWF television. Their feud ended up spilling into other promotions such as Cueball Carmichael's Independent Professional Wrestling Alliance. He continued making appearance in NJCW during the first half of 1997 and later had matches against Joe Thunder and joined forces with Mad Dog O'Malley to face Thunder and Gino Caruso.

By the mid-1990s, the MEWF was at the peak of its success. It regularly featured talent from Philadelphia's Extreme Championship Wrestling, due in part to then booker Axl Rotten, including Raven, Stevie Richards, The Blue Meanie, Damien Kane, Pit Bull #2, and The Bad Breed (Ian and Axl Rotten), as well as The Honky Tonk Man, Jim Neidhart, Tom Brandi, and The Headbangers from the World Wrestling Federation and World Championship Wrestling's Joey Maggs and Disco Inferno. Several independent stars such as Boo Bradley, Devon Storm, Steve Corino, Jimmy Cicero, Christian York, Quinn Nash, and "Judge" Jeff Jones also made their home in the MEWF. Their success encouraged he and Wipprecht opened their own training facility for the MEWF, the "Brain Buster's Pro Wrestling Academy", which included Bob Starr as an instructor.

=== Rivalry with Maryland Championship Wrestling (1998–2002) ===
In 1998, Corporal Punishment and Mark Shrader left the MEWF to form a rival company, Maryland Championship Wrestling, over creative control and salary disagreements. Most of the roster jumped to the newly formed promotion, leaving few of the originals remaining. Axl Rotten, MEWF's longtime booker, was among those who had departed the company, which meant MCW was not receiving ECW's talent. Burke was forced to use Brain Buster students to make up the loss while mainstays such as Bob Starr and Morgus The Maniac were tasked with carrying the promotion during 1998–99. Burke brought in World Wrestling Federation legends including The Honky Tonk Man and George "The Animal" Steele as well as developed new stars through its training facility such as Ruckus and Tonya Stevens. Stevens, one of the few female referees in pro wrestling, was initially trained as a wrestler and later agreed to referee for the promotion.

On April 29, 2000, after Patch was stripped of the MEWF Heavyweight Championship, a match was held between Burke and Max Thrasher for the vacant title in Middle River, Maryland, which Burke won. "Hacksaw" Jim Duggan was the special guest referee. During his third championship reign, he defeated Dino Casanova, Ruckus, and Mad Dog O' Malley. O'Malley would become one Burke's major rivals for the title. Though defeating O'Malley in a cage match several months earlier, he was confronted by the 450-pound Irish brawler at a June 24 MEWF house show in Dundalk, Maryland while conducting an in-ring interview. O'Malley had taken issue with Burke's announcement to the crowd that he would be defending the championship against the "younger and newer competition in the MEWF". After a brief argument between the two, Burke was blindsided by O'Malley and left lying in the ring. Burke ended up getting the better of O'Malley, decisively defeating him in their match at the main event. Burke voluntarily forfeited the title on August 9, 2000, at a special memorial show for fellow MEWF wrestler DOA, "DOA: A Night to Remember", in Martinsburg, West Virginia so DOA could be posthumously awarded the title for one night only. He was defeated for the title by Buzz Stryker in Middle River three days later.

He and Bob Starr reunited to defeat The Tokyo Terrors (Keushiro and Watsumi) for the MEWF Tag Team Championship a month later. They remained champions for over a year, defending the titles against teams such as The Freak Show and Tommy Hawk & Jimmy Jannetty, before losing the titles to Rayne and Buzz Stryker in Dundalk, Maryland on October 16, 2001. Burke had one more tag team championship run with his old rival Max Thrasher, winning them KPA on June 9, 2002, and successfully defended the belts until November 24, 2002, when he and Bob Starr (substituting for Thrasher) lost to Chad Bowman and Dino Casanova.

=== Final years of the Mid-Eastern Wrestling Federation (2002–2004) ===
Through Bruke's efforts, the MEWF was able to survive the departure of Corporal Punishment and Mark Shrader. It continued suffering from internal problems with MEWF talent, specifically backstage politics among the younger wrestlers, which resulted in stars like Ruckus and Sonjay Dutt, despite remaining loyal to the promotion and willing to work for less money, being phased out from the company. The promotion also failed to find a long-term replacement for booker Axl Rotten, using Bob Starr and Mark Osbourne among others, instead changing bookers every few months. These reasons, among others, ensured the MEWF would never fully recover. In early 2002, Tim's wife, Donna Burke took over the day-to-day running of the MEWF promoting shows twice a month at Dundalk's North Point Flea Market.

On March 1, 2002, MEWF original Dave Casanova died following heart attack. A memorial show was held in his honor three months later jointly promoted by both the MEWF and MCW. It was the first time that wrestlers from either promotion appeared in the same ring together since the 1997 split. Lucifer and Thrasher successfully defended the tag titles against Thunder & Ceremery at the show. It was around this time that Derek Wayne, a former student of MCW's Bonebreakers wrestling school, heavily invested in the promotion and became a third co-owner. Wayne was able to make peace between Burke and MCW owner Dan McDevitt and was able to persuade them to begin working together in October 2002. A storyline invasion took place between the two companies for the next seven months, to somewhat mixed reaction from fans, ending with MCW's final show, the 2003 Shane Shamrock Memorial Cup, on July 16, 2003, at Michael's Eighth Avenue in Glen Burnie, Maryland. Burke previously appeared on several MCW show during this time against Gillberg (January 29, 2003) and with The Holy Rollers (Earl The Pearl & Ramblin Rich) won a six-team blindfolded match with Lita as special guest referee (May 15, 2003).

Though the MEWF was now the single remaining promotion in the Baltimore area, it was unable to win over MCW's former fanbase and attendance gradually dwindled as the booking became increasingly comedic. Former MCW talent began to leave the company and, if fact, many one-time MCW wrestlers refused to work for Burke despite Jeff Jones and Dan McDevitt were now involved backstage. McDevitt would quietly leave within a few months while Derek Wayne was forced out of the company.

Meanwhile, Burke was wrestling less and less. In June 2003, when Brand X's G-Dawg was stuck at the airport, Burke took his place so that his tag team partner Buckchyld would be able to face then MEWF Tag Team Champions Team Punishment (Buzz Stryker & Derek Wayne). One of his last matches was another tag team match with Dustin Timberlake defeating The Cracker Express in Dundalk, Maryland on March 28, 2004. Its final show was held on October 30, 2004.

=== Later career (2005–2009) ===
After the close of the MEWF, Burke went into semi-retirement though he continued to be a fixture at many Maryland wrestling events. He joined Maryland Championship Wrestling following its revival in 2006 and could be seen by fans selling tickets or working gimmick tables at the MCW events. He was also known for friendly interactions with audience members, both in the MEWF and MCW, often welcoming arriving fans "with a small joke or high five" and enjoyed personal relationships with a number of regulars. To his fellow wrestlers, he was a colorful character with a penchant for "ribbing". His frequent use of the phrase "Hey boss" as a greeting, according to "Judge" Jeff Jones, was imitated by many who knew him. He was very much characterized by his many catchphrases and a well known quote in the business, "Wrestling is no place for people with long memories", is attributed to Burke.

At MCW's "Legends of Maryland" show, Burke was inducted into the MCW Hall of Fame along with Duane Gill and Axl Rotten. It was also at the event that he wrestled his final match against the Cat Burglar, which he won.

== Death ==
Burke died on June 21, 2011, after a long battle with cancer. He was buried in Meadow Ridge Memorial Park in Elkridge, Maryland. At the time of his death, a number of wrestling personalities left messages of condolences at MCW's official website which it then posted publicly. Many of them, such as those from Christian York, Jimmy Cicero, Tonya Stevens and "Judge" Jeff Jones, thanked Burke for giving them their first opportunities in pro wrestling.

At MCW Shane Shamrock Cup 11 on July 30, 2011, a ten-bell salute was observed in honor of Burke's death. At the time of his MCW Hall of Fame induction, the company acknowledged the contributions of Burke and Dennis Wipprecht stating that "had it not been for these two men there may not be wrestling in Maryland today".

== Championships and accomplishments ==
- East Coast Wrestling Association
  - ECWA Tag Team Championship (1 time) – with Bob Starr
- Maryland Championship Wrestling
  - MCW Hall of Fame (Class of 2009)
- Mid-Eastern Wrestling Federation
  - MEWF Heavyweight Championship (3 times)
  - MEWF Tag Team Championship (4 times) – with Bob Starr (2), Cat Burglar (1), and Max Thrasher (1)
- Regional Championship Wrestling
  - RCW Television Championship (2 times, first)
  - RCW Tag Team Championship (1 time) – with Trooper Gilmore
  - RCW United States Tag Team Championship (1 time) – with Adam Flash
