= Mad Dog O'Malley =

Irish-American professional wrestler

Professional wrestling career
- Ring name(s): Mad Dog O'Malley; Maddog O'Malley
- Billed height: 6 ft 4 in (1.93 m)
- Billed weight: 430 lb (200 kg)
- Billed from: "the dog pounds of Dublin, Ireland"; Northern Ireland
- Debut: 1993
- Retired: 2003

Mad Dog O'Malley is a retired Irish-American professional wrestler who competed on the East Coast and Mid-Atlantic independent circuit during the 1990s and early 2000s. He was one of the region's most dominant "heels" for much of the decade, billed as a 500 lbs. Irish brawler from Dublin (or Northern Ireland at times), and a top star for the Mid-Eastern Wrestling Federation winning both the MEWF Heavyweight Championship and the MEWF Tag Team Championship twice with Joe Thunder.

O'Malley also had success in other promotions, most notably, Cueball Carmichael's Independent Professional Wrestling Alliance and Maryland Championship Wrestling. He and Carmichael appeared at MCW's inaugural Shane Shamrock Memorial Cup in 1998.

== Career ==
=== Mid-Eastern Wrestling Federation (1993–1997) ===
Making his debut in 1993, Mad Dog O'Malley quickly made a name for himself on the East Coast and Mid-Atlantic independent circuit as a 400 lbs. Irish brawler "from the dog pounds of Dublin, Ireland". O'Malley, similar to superheavyweights such as Bam Bam Bigelow, gained attention for his surprising agility given his size. Within a year, he began wrestling for Dennis Wippercht and Tim "Lucifer" Burke's Mid-Eastern Wrestling Federation in Essex, Maryland. On 26 February 1995, he pinned Morgus the Maniac to win the promotion's heavyweight championship though O'Malley lost the belt to Corporal Punishment a month later.

At the event, O'Malley had originally defeated The World's Greatest Wrestling Clown and afterwards put out an open challenge to the rest of the MEWF roster. He successfully defeated two other wrestlers, Billy Brat and Johnny Taylor, and was in the middle of wrestling the Ultimate Comet when referee Dave the Wave was bumped from the ring. In the confusion, Corporal Punishment entered the ring, attacked the Ultimate Comet, and was able to pin O'Malley by the time the referee came to. At the end of the match, fellow referee Jeff Jones confronted Dave the Wave and berated him on the outcome of the match. Their argument escalated into a full-blown fist fight which had to be broken up by Axl Rotten, Dr. Pain and the Ultimate Comet, the three sending Jones back to the locker room and setting up a "referee vs. referee" match between the two men.

He later began teaming with Joe Thunder and the two briefly held the MEWF Tag Team Championship, defeating then reigning champion Michael Sweet and Rockin' Rebel (substituting for Sweet's Models Inc. tag team partner Johnny Handsome) on 8 July 1995, before losing the titles to Quinn Nash and Adam Flash the following day. Other notable tag team partners on the "indy circuit" included Bobby Taylor, The Inferno Kid, Lucifer, Morgus the Maniac, Cueball Carmichael, and Buster Maccabi.

Over the next two years, O'Malley wrestled Pat Patterson, Jr., "Hollywood" Bob Starr, Bluedust, and The Wiseguys (Jimmy Cicero & Steve Corino). In 1997, he teamed with Lucifer to face his former tag team partner Joe Thunder and Gino Caruso.

=== Maryland Championship Wrestling (1998–1999) ===
By the late-1990s, O'Malley was also competing in other Mid-Atlantic independents such as Cueball Carmichael's Independent Professional Wrestling Alliance and Maryland Championship Wrestling. During this time, he battled "Hollywood" Bob Starr and Morgus the Maniac in dog-collar matches throughout the Mid-Atlantic as well as impressive wins over The Iron Sheik, Nikolai Volkoff, Cactus Jack, "Superfly" Jimmy Snuka, Raven, The Headbangers, and The Honky Tonk Man.

Upon entering MCW, O'Malley formed an alliance with Cueball Carmichael and began feuding with former MCW Heavyweight Champion The Bruiser. One of his earliest appearances was on 16 August 1998, with he and Cueball Carmichael in a tag team match with The Bruiser and King Kong Bundy. On 20 September, shortly after the death of Shane Shamrock, O'Malley and Carmichael made an appearance at the promotion's memorial show held at the Patapsco Arena in Baltimore, Maryland. He served as the corner man for Carmichael in his bout against The Bruiser. He later interfered in the match allowing Carmichael to win the match. He would face The Bruiser in a match himself the following month at MCW's Heavyweight Championship Tournament. On 4 November 1998, O'Malley took part in MCW's "Legends Come to Town" in Glen Burnie, Maryland wrestling Christian York. The card also included independent wrestlers Joey Matthews, Lance Diamond, Jimmy Cicero, Julio Sanchez, and Tom Brandi, Extreme Championship Wrestling's The Blue Meanie & Nova, Stevie Richards, Terry Funk, and former World Wrestling Federation star Yokozuna.

On 7 January 1999, O'Malley wrestled the WWF's Joey Abs of the Mean Street Posse at an MCW show in Glen Burnie. In October of that year, O'Malley was one of several MEWF wrestlers to participate in a fundraiser for North Carroll High School, the "Pro Wrestling Spectacular", attended by an estimated 1,500 fans. Among the wrestlers on the card included Max Thrasher, Morgus the Maniac, Bob Backlund, Gillberg, Earthquake and George "The Animal" Steele.

=== Mid-Eastern Wrestling Federation (2000–2003) ===
On 7 January 2000, nearly five years after losing the MEWF tag team title, O'Malley and Joe Thunder were awarded the belts when then champions The Good, The Bad and The Ugly broke up; the titles were eventually vacated. During the first half of 2000, he made several attempts to win the MEWF Heavyweight Championship from Lucifer. Though losing to him in a cage match several months earlier, O'Malley challenged Lucifer at an MEWF house show in Dundalk, Maryland on 24 June. He confronted the champion at the start of the show, who was then conducting an in-ring interview, and took issue with Lucifer's announcement to the crowd that he would be defending the heavyweight title against the "younger and newer competition in the MEWF". O'Malley ended up attacking Lucifer and, though getting the better of him, he was pinned by the champion in the main event later that night.

O'Malley appeared less and less frequently during the MEWF's last years; his final major appearance was at a memorial show for Dino Casanova in Baltimore on 9 June 2002, where he won a battle royal. O'Malley retired shortly before the MEWF closed in 2004.

== Championships and accomplishments ==
- Mid-Eastern Wrestling Federation
  - MEWF Heavyweight Championship (1 time)
  - MEWF Tag Team Championship (2 times) – with Joe Thunder
- Pro Wrestling Illustrated
  - PWI ranked him #497 of the top 500 singles wrestlers in the PWI 500 in 1998
  - PWI ranked him #421 of the top 500 singles wrestlers in the PWI 500 in 1996
