= Max Thrasher =

American professional wrestler (born 1962)

Personal information
- Born: Philip Andrew Livelsberger; February 7, 1962 (age 64) Hanover, Pennsylvania, U.S.
- Spouse: Wendy Ann Williams (m. 2003).

Professional wrestling career
- Ring name(s): Max Thrasher; The Bounty Hunter; The Original Bounty Hunter; Hellhound #2; Executioner #2
- Billed height: 6 ft 2 in (1.88 m)
- Billed weight: 255 lb (116 kg)
- Billed from: The Paradise Knife & Gun Club in the Bronx, New York City; Milwaukee, Wisconsin (ECW)
- Trained by: Bob Miller; Damien Kane
- Debut: 1987
- Retired: 2010

Philip Andrew "Phil" Livelsberger (born February 7, 1962), better known by the ring name Max Thrasher, is an American retired professional wrestler, promoter and trainer. He is best known for his tenure in Eastern Championship Wrestling, as one-half of The Night Breed with Glen Osbourne, and the Mid-Eastern Wrestling Federation, where he won the MEWF Heavyweight Championship three times, the MEWF Mid-Atlantic Championship two times and the MEWF Tag Team Championship two times (once each with Dino Casanova and Lucifer). Livelsberger also trained a number of independent stars including, most notably, Morgus the Maniac, Adam Flash and Kevin Featherstone.

Livelsberger started his career in the Atlantic Wrestling Federation and had a brief stint in Jim Crockett Promotions as a preliminary wrestler. He emerged as a top heel performer in the Mid-Atlantic U.S. during the 1990s and wrestled for several prominent independent promotions: the National Wrestling Federation, National Wrestling League, Trans World Wrestling Federation, Tri-State Wrestling Alliance and Maryland Championship Wrestling. He has also wrestled overseas in Greece, Guam, the Philippines and Japan.

== Early life and education ==
Livelsberger was born February 7, 1962, to Leo P. Livelsberger and his wife and raised in Hanover, Pennsylvania. He is one of seven children. His father was a hospital worker, while his mother was a homemaker. Livelsberger became a fan of professional wrestling after seeing an episode of WWWF All-Star Wrestling when he was six years old. Livelsberger attended Delone Catholic High School where he took part in football, rugby, and wrestling. He also studied karate for eight years.

He played football for Delaware Valley College and worked as a debt collector to partly pay his way through school. Livelsberger left DelVal to compete in full contact karate but returned after two years and graduated in 1984 with a bachelor's degree in biology. He also earned a degree in animal care from the University of New York in 1985. Over the next few years, Livelsberger had a number of jobs including work as a brick mason, dog groomer, and sous chef.

== Professional wrestling career ==
=== Early career and the Atlantic Wrestling Federation (1987–1988) ===
Livelsberger struggled to break into pro wrestling during his mid-20s, owing largely to his lack of connections and was turned down by several wrestling schools due to his size. In late 1986, he got in contact with Bob Miller who owned the Mason-Dixon Gym in New Oxford, Pennsylvania. Miller had recently started a local training facility out of the gym with National Wrestling Federation wrestler Damien Kane. At the time, Livelsberger was earning minimum wage as a waiter but another restaurant employee agreed to co-sign a loan so he could pay the $1500 tuition (equivalent to $4,406 in 2025). One of their first students, he spent the next six months training under hard conditions. The school did not have a wrestling ring and students had to work on a cement floor. In July 1987, Livelsberger was one of several students featured in a story on the school by the Hanover Evening Sun.

Livelsberger made his pro debut on August 22, 1987, against Larry Winters in front of around 2,500 fans for a Mason-Dixon show at Heiges Field House. He was accompanied by Darren Wyse as his manager. Miller started running shows under the Mason-Dixon Sports / Atlantic Wrestling Federation banner and within two months Livelsberger was working as the group's booker. After a handful of shows, Miller closed down the gym and Livelsberger took over the AWF in early 1988. Ed Zohn was brought on as a partner and later served as the on-screen AWF President. Livelsberger also opened his own wrestling school, initially out of a garage in his hometown of Hanover and later in York, Pennsylvania. Using a mix of established Mid-Atlantic talent and his wrestling students, Livelsberger promoted regular events at the Hanover State Armory. In addition to wrestling, his students also set up the ring, put up posters and sold tickets for AWF events. In April 1988, Livelsberger defeated Sweet Daddy Falcone in a tournament final to become the promotion's first heavyweight champion.

=== Jim Crockett Promotions (1988) ===
During his rookie year, Thrasher was contacted by Jim Crockett Promotions to work as a preliminary wrestler. Thrasher made his JCP debut against Brad Armstrong at the Baltimore Civic Center on June 11, 1988. He subsequently wrestled Blackjack Mulligan, Jimmy Valiant and The Rock 'n' Roll Express (Ricky Morton and Robert Gibson) at house shows in North Carolina. His appearances for the promotion stopped after then booker Dusty Rhodes was fired by Turner Broadcasting in November 1988. He spent much of his early career on the local independent circuit wrestling as "The Bounty Hunter" but began using the ring name Max Thrasher to separate himself from other wrestlers using the name at the time, particularly the masked wrestler who appeared on World Championship Wrestling television during 1989.

=== Independent circuit (1989–1990) ===
The following year, Thrasher feuded over the AWF Heavyweight Championship with Bam Bam Bigelow. For their first match in York, AWF President Ed Zohn brought in Don Muraco as a special referee. Wrestling journalist Bill Apter, who was travelling with Bigelow at the time, was present for their match in Elkins, West Virginia. This resulted in coverage from major pro wrestling magazines and was a nominee for PWI Match of the Year. Bigelow was impressed by Thrasher and passed along his name to casting agents. This led to Thrasher being considered for a role in the romantic comedy film Mannequin Two: On the Move (1991). Following a successful audition in April 1990, Thrasher and his wrestling student Don Eminizer were to appear together in the film's bar fight scenes.

During this period, he successfully defended his AWF title against National Wrestling Alliance star Nikita Koloff. as well as ex-World Wide Wrestling Federation veterans Afa the Wild Samoan and Chief Jules Strongbow. He also made appearances for other local Mid-Atlantic promotions including the National Wrestling League and Trans World Wrestling Federation. In June 1990, Thrasher went on his first international tour with the NWL to Guam. It was on this tour that he lost the AWF Heavyweight Championship to John Rambo at the University of Guam after a two-year title reign. The show was seen by 3,600 fans and included Gov. Joseph F. Ada and Congressional Del. Ben Blaz in attendance. Their match was featured on the front page of the Pacific Daily News. Their rematch the following night was seen by 4,500 people. After being pinned by Rambo once again, Thrasher attacked referee Dave "The Wave" McCallister and was fined $1,000. Thrasher has attributed the show's popularity due to foreign wrestling fans believing Sylvester Stallone was actually portraying Rambo.

He quickly regained the belt in Hilo, Hawaii, on June 30, before 2,500 fans. and held onto the championship for another year and a half. In the next few months, the AWF wrestling school was featured in the Hanover Evening Sun and on WGAL-TV. Around this time, Thrasher ran his own boxing-wrestling ring rental service. It was suggested by his friend Ted Petty, who sold him his first ring, as a way to network and make introductions to promoters outside the Eastern Pennsylvania area. He and Petty were one of the few people on the U.S. East Coast that owned a wrestling ring. The two worked closely together to supply rings to many independent shows in the region for a number of years. Thrasher has credited Petty for helping increase his visibility in the Mid-Atlantic and Northeast independent circuit.

=== Atlantic States Wrestling Association (1990) ===
Thrasher began working for Atlantic States Wrestling Association run by Earl Kirk and Axl Rotten. Based in Baltimore, Maryland, it had a weekly television series that aired on Home Team Sports. He feuded with A.J. Fritzoid, then one of the Mid-Atlantic's most popular indy stars, over the ASWA Heavyweight Championship. While doing guest color commentator on ASWA Wrestling Fury, Thrasher attacked Fritzoid after a title match against Morgus the Maniac. He also attacked both Fritzoid and an ASWA announcer during a TV interview. Thrasher was fined $1,000 and suspended for 30 days by Kirk. The feud culminated in a barbwire match at the Springettsbury Township Fire Company.

=== Tri-State Wrestling Alliance (1990–1991) ===
In the fall of 1990, Thrasher joined Joel Goodhart's Tri-State Wrestling Alliance promotion in Philadelphia, Pennsylvania. Goodheart had initially hired Thrasher to rent out his ring, based on the suggestion of Petty, but later brought him in as a wrestler. He made his debut at the company's fourth supercard Autumn Armageddon on September 15 at Pennsylvania Hall, defeating Tim Frye. Thrasher was also part in the co-main event, a 20-man Reverse Battle Royal match in which the first man to climb into a steel cage was declared the winner.

Thrasher's work with other local groups at this time, as well as his own promotion-wrestling school, initially limited his TWA bookings. He made several appearances on TWA's "Original Sports Bar" shows facing J.T. Smith (January 28), Michael Bruno (February 24) and Ghetto Blaster (August 19). On August 20, 1991, Thrasher entered an 8-man tournament to crown the inaugural TWA Bar Wars Champion but was eliminated in the opening round by D.C. Drake. He came back several months later winning victories over Harley Watkins (November 19) and The Rockin' Rebel (December 7, 1991).

=== Independent circuit (1991–1993) ===
On February 28, 1991, Thrasher teamed with Sammy Austin as The Executioners against The Beach Boys (Larry Winters and Dusty Wolfe) at the Peace and Friendship Stadium, as part of a one-night NWF tour of Athens, Greece. Thrasher wrestled as the masked Executioner #2 and was pinned by Winters. Seen by 5,500 fans, it was the most attended show by an independent promotion for that year.

That spring, Thrasher became involved with Ed Zohn in Universal Independent Wrestling. The organization was formed partly as a way to encourage collaboration between all the independent promotions based in Maryland. A weekly television series was co-produced with the Gambo family at WJZ-TV as a way to showcase the best talent in the Mid-Atlantic region which aired in Baltimore and syndicated to York, Pennsylvania, and Keyser, West Virginia. Thrasher became one of the company's early stars. Aligning himself with manager Kevin "The Truth" Casey, Thrasher feuded with UIW Heavyweight Champion The Golden Phoenix. On August 17, 1991, he wrestled The Golden Phoenix in a Hair vs. Career match at "Romp 'N' Roll II" in Dundalk, Maryland.

In late-1991, Thrasher began working for Dennis Wippercht and Tim Burke in the Mid-Eastern Wrestling Federation. On October 11, 1991, Thrasher and Kirk Dredd unsuccessfully challenged MEWF Tag Team Champions The Lords of Darkness (Agony and Pain) in a Falls Count Anywhere match in Pasadena, Maryland. He briefly formed The Hellhounds, a masked tag team, with Ricky Blues. and they captured the AWF Tag Team Championship in December 1991.

In early-1992, Thrasher teamed with A.J. Fritzoid to win the UIW Tag Team Championship from The Cream Team (Rip Sawyer and Dave Casanova). He next appeared for the Wrestling Independent Network, run by Ed Zohn and Steve Unterman, in Baltimore. On April 11, Thrasher wrestled The Cheetah Kid at Juniata High School in Mifflintown, Pennsylvania. Thrasher briefly left the UIW that same month, forcing the promotion to vacate the tag team belts. A month later, Thrasher was back in UIW where he and Brick Bronsky battled to a double countout in Tamaqua, Pennsylvania. On June 14, 1992, Thrasher defeated Tommy Rose at WIN's Star Mangled Banner I to advance in the tournament for the WIN Heavyweight Championship.

On July 11, Thrasher defeated Hollywood Bob Starr and A.C. Golden in the finals of an 8-man tournament to win the then vacant MEWF Heavyweight Championship. He held the title for over six months before dropping the belt to Lucifer.

On July 19, Thrasher defeated AJ Fritzoid (substituting for Neil Superior) in the semi-finals of the WIN Heavyweight Championship Tournament.

In August 1992, Thrasher's "Circus Asylum" wrestling school was profiled in the York Daily Record. The Canadian Wolfman, Kirk Dredd and Adam Flash were among the students to come out of the training facility.

In the fall, Thrasher returned Baltimore working for the Mid-Eastern Wrestling Federation and the Wrestling Independent Network. On September 13, 1992, Thrasher lost to A.C. Golden in a tournament final to crown the first WIN Heavyweight Champion.

On October 29, 1992, the Atlantic Wrestling Federation took part in an interpromotional show also involving the MEWF, WIN and World Wrestling Association in Glen Burnie, Maryland. Thrasher appeared in the semi-main event wrestling AWF Heavyweight Champion Kirk Dredd in a "champion vs. champion" match which ended in a double-disqualification. On November 14, he faced Ivan Koloff at a MEWF show in Gaithersburg, Maryland. On November 21, 1992, Thrasher headlined a joint-AWF/MEWF show with The Honky Tonk Man at North Carroll High School in Hampstead, Maryland.

In the summer of 1993, Thrasher joined the American Commonwealth Wrestling established by Mark Bodey, Ed Zohn and Jeff Capo. On June 17, Thrasher was crowned the promotion's inaugural heavyweight champion. On June 26, 1993, Thrasher battled Chief Jules Strongbow at a National Wrestling Federation show in West Orange, New Jersey. On July 22, he defended the title in a Lumberjack match against Lucifer in York, Pennsylvania. Thrasher held the ACW title for nearly five months before losing the belt to Rip Sawyer in Steelton, Pennsylvania, on November 6, 1993.

=== Eastern Championship Wrestling (1992-1993) ===
Thrasher opted to become part of Tod Gordon's Eastern Championship Wrestling after Goodheart abruptly closed the TWA. He appeared at ECW's first ever event "Market Street Mayhem" on February 5, 1992. Thrasher was pinned by "Gentleman" Jeff Royal, who used the ropes for leverage. Thrasher also supplied the ring for ECW's inaugural show. After a brief losing streak, with losses to King Kaluha and Larry Winters, he formed a partnership with Glen Osbourne. As The Night Breed, Thrasher and Osbourne proved successful in the tag team division. In June 1992, they participated in an 4-team tournament to crown the first ECW Tag Team Champions. Night Breed defeated The Flames (Mr. Anthony and Mr. Perez) in the opening round but lost to The Super Destroyers (Super Destroyer I and Super Destroyer II) in the finals, with Thrasher being pinned.

The Night Breed continued to struggle over the summer of 1992. The team lost a rematch to The Super Destroyers for ECW Tag Team Championship on July 14. The team fell victim to a month long losing streak, including defeats by The Super Ninja and Scott Summers and The Hellriders (E.Z. Ryder & H.D. Ryder), eventually resulting in their breakup and subsequent feud by the end of the summer. Backed by The Super Destroyers, Thrasher was disqualified in most of his encounters with Osbourne. He eventually lost to Osborne in a 6-man tag team match with The Super Destroyers against Osbourne and The Cream Team (Rip Sawyer and Dave Casanova) on October 3 and, in a singles match, failed to win the ECW Television Championship from Osbourne on October 24, 1992.

On December 19, 1992, at "Morrisville Mayhem", Thrasher pinned Smith due to outside interference from The Metal Maniac. A few months later, Thrasher formed a tag team with Smith. They made their debut on the May 11th edition of ECW Hardcore TV against Hot Stuff International (Eddie Gilbert and Jimmy Snuka) with Thrasher being pinned by Snuka. In a rematch the following week, Thrasher attacked his partner starting a feud between the two men. Thrasher and The Canadian Wolfman faced Smith and Tommy Cairo on the May 25 episode of ECW Hardcore TV, with Smith pinning Wolfman. Their first one-on-one match took place on June 1, in which Thrasher donned a hockey mask, and saw Smith get a pinfall victory. On the June 8th edition of ECW Hardcore TV, Thrasher took part in a 16-man Battle Royal for the inaugural ECW Pennsylvania Heavyweight Championship which was won by Tommy Cairo. His last ECW television appearance was on June 29 when he and Rockin' Rebel helped Tony Stetson attack Larry Winters until the rest of the locker room came out to break it up.

Thrasher was one of many former Tri-State wrestlers on the ECW roster who were phased out after Paul Heyman replaced Gilbert as the promotion's booker. Heyman wanted to focus on his own handpicked group of wrestlers more willing to take part in hardcore wrestling. ECW also stopped renting from Thrasher when the promotion bought their own rings.

That fall, Thrasher made his final ECW appearance losing to Super Destroyer I at "Morrisville Mayhem II". On November 14, 1993, Thrasher took part in a co-ECW/MEWF show in Essex, Maryland, teaming with Duane Gill, Tommy Lee Manson and Bob Starr in an eight-man elimination match against Mike Khoury, Joe Thunder, Max Moon and Tommy Dreamer in Essex, Maryland. Thrasher's team lost and Khoury, the sole survivor, was awarded the MEWF Mid-Atlantic Championship according to a pre-match stipulation.

=== Independent circuit (1994–1995) ===
Thrasher had a limited ring schedule in the mid-1990s sticking close to York, Pennsylvania. Over the next year in ACW, he wrestled Virgil Morgus the Maniac and Johnny Gunn.

During a July 29 appearance at Sauconfest '94 ("Saucon Slam '94") in Lower Saucon Township, Pennsylvania, beating Mad Mack Diesel, Thrasher attacked a referee with the timekeeper's bell in front of 1,000 fans. On September 24, 1994, Thrasher was part of a benefit show at Steel Valley High School for the victims of an arson attack in Homestead, Pennsylvania. At ACW's "Fall Wrestlefest '94", Thrasher faced Glen Osbourne.

He was originally scheduled to join Gunn and 2 Cold Scorpio in a six-man tag team elimination match against Ramblin' Rich and The Goodfellas (Dino Casanova and Romeo Valentino). On June 11, 1995, Thrasher was in attendance for the disastrous debut of Bill Rose's Urban Wrestling Federation in Downtown Baltimore. He was originally scheduled to team with Hack Myers against The Goodfellas but was among a number of cancelled matches due to the poor turnout. He retired form wrestling.

=== Mid-Eastern Wrestling Federation (1998–1999) ===
In 1998, Thrasher defeated Adam Flash for the MEWF Mid-Atlantic Championship. He later lost the belt to Steve Corino.

=== Lethal Arts Wrestling (1999–2000) ===
During his time on the independent circuit, Thrasher had a brief stint in Ed Zohn's Lethal Arts Wrestling (later Lethal Wrestling Federation). On April 16, 1999, he wrestled T. Rantula on its first-ever show at Eagle Hall in Lebanon, Pennsylvania. He feuded with Dino Casanova over the summer. He also challenged then LWF Heavyweight Champion "Doomsday" Danny Rose, but was unable to win the title.

=== Mid-Eastern Wrestling Federation (1999–2002) ===
In October 1999, Thrasher and Dino Casanova defeated The Bad Crew to win the MEWF Tag Team Championship. Along with their manager Wolfman Baker, the trio were collectively known as The Good, Bad and Ugly. During the team's reign as champions, they feuded with Black & Blue (Flexx Wheeler and Ricky Blues), under the tutelage of manager Jim Cornette. They eventually lost the belts to Blues and The New Patriot on November 13, 1999, at North Carroll High School's "Pro Wrestling Spectacular VIII" in Hampstead, Maryland. While they managed to regain the belts in Dundalk on January 7, 2000, beating the team of Black & Blue, the group broke up after their victory. The titles were then awarded to Joe Thunder and Mad Dog O'Malley.

On April 29 in Middle River, Maryland, after Patch was stripped of the MEWF Heavyweight Championship, Thrasher entered a one-night tournament to crown a new champion. He lost to Lucifer in the tournament finals with Hacksaw Jim Duggan as special referee. On July 13, Thrasher was defeated by George "The Animal" Steele at Harry Grove Stadium in Frederick, Maryland. The next night, at MEWF Summer Sizzler 2, he was scheduled to team with Dino Casanova against MEWF Tag Team Champions The Tokyo Terrors (Red & Blue). When Thrasher could not be found in the building, however, Casanova picked Romeo Valentino as a last-minute substitute. Thrasher later interfered in the match on their behalf causing The Goodfellas to be disqualified, and an argument ensued between Thrasher and Casanova. Valentino later caused Thrasher to be disqualified in his match with Morgus the Maniac. The Goodfellas handcuffed Thrasher to the top rope and continued attacking him until they were run off by Lucifer and others from the locker room helped Thrasher to the back.

On September 22, 2000, Thrasher defeated MEWF Heavyweight and Mid-Atlantic Champion Buzz Stryker during a Four-Way Dance against Morgus the Maniac and Dino Casanova regaining the title after seven years. During the next three months, he and Dino Casanova would fight over both titles. Thrasher briefly lost the heavyweight title to Casanova in the fall but won it back on November 11, 2000, at North Carroll High School's "Pro Wrestling Spectacular IX". He eventually lost the Mid-Atlantic Championship to Casanova on January 27, 2001. His third heavyweight reign lasted only several months before being forced to vacate the title on March 17, 2001.

Thrasher again reunited with Lucifer to regain the MEWF Tag Team Championship defeating The KPA (Joe Thunder and Steve Camry) on June 9, 2002. After a five-month reign, Thrasher and Bob Starr (substituting for Lucifer) lost the titles to Dino Casanova and Chad Bowman on November 24, 2002.

=== Later career and retirement (2002–2010) ===
In the early-2000s, Thrasher began winding down his pro wrestling career to work full time as a public school teacher. Thrasher cited mounting injuries as one of the reasons for his retirement. He did, however, make occasional in-ring appearances in York, Pennsylvania over the next decade. On March 22, 2002, he wrestled former student Morgus the Maniac for the Susquehanna Wrestling Organization. He also faced ex-ECW tag team partner Glen Osbourne in a joint SWO show with the World Wide Wrestling Alliance on June 14, 2003. The Night Breed reunited in the SWO on August 14, 2005, against ECW rivals The Super Destroyers with the match ending in a double disqualification.

On October 30, 2010, Thrasher came out of retirement to wrestle on Maryland Championship Wrestling's "Legends of Maryland Wrestling" show at The New Green Room in Dundalk, Maryland. He joined Mike Khoury in defeating Brent Young and Jimmy Jannetty. In November 2011, Thrasher was inducted into the MCW Hall of Fame.

== Personal life ==
In 1990, Livelsberger received a degree in teaching from Gettysburg College. Three years later, he began working as a part-time substitute teacher and wrestling coach for the York City School District. In 1996, Livelsberger was involved in controversy over two female students joining the all-male wrestling team. Although he was not in favor of intergender wrestling, Livelsberger defended their right to remain on the team. Specializing in alternative education, he also worked with the VisionQuest juvenile offenders program and the York County School of Technology. After leaving pro wrestling, Livelsberger attended Pennsylvania State University and graduated with a master's degree and principal certification in 2004. Livelsberger subsequently spent nine years as an administrator for the Dover Area School District, during which time he earned a doctorate in education from Immaculata University.

In 2014, Livelsberger accepted an offer from the York City school district to become the principal of newly reopened Hannah Penn Elementary School.

In Fall 2015, Livelsberger became the principal of Jackson Elementary School. In June 2016, a 16-year-old William Penn Senior High School student's "thumb wrestling ring project", designed as part of Martin Library's summer reading program, was modeled after "Max Thrasher" and featured in The York Dispatch.

== Championships and accomplishments ==
- American Commonwealth Wrestling
  - ACW Heavyweight Championship (1 time)
- Atlantic Wrestling Federation
  - AWF Heavyweight Championship (2 times)
  - AWF Tag Team Championship (1 time) – with Hellhound #1
- Maryland Championship Wrestling
  - MCW Hall of Fame (Class of 2011)
- Mid-Eastern Wrestling Federation
  - MEWF Heavyweight Championship (3 times)
  - MEWF Mid-Atlantic Championship (2 times)
  - MEWF Tag Team Championship (2 times) – with Dino Casanova and Lucifer
- Pro Wrestling Illustrated
  - PWI ranked him # 372 of the 500 best singles wrestlers of the PWI 500 in 1995
  - PWI ranked him # 379 of the 500 best singles wrestlers of the PWI 500 in 1994
  - PWI ranked him # 220 of the 500 best singles wrestlers of the PWI 500 in 1993
  - PWI ranked him # 260 of the 500 best singles wrestlers of the PWI 500 in 1992
  - PWI ranked him # 444 of the 500 best singles wrestlers of the PWI 500 in 1991
- Universal Independent Wrestling
  - UIW Tag Team Championship (1 time) – with A.J. Fritzoid
