= Romeo Valentino =

American professional wrestler (born 1968)

Personal information
- Born: July 8, 1968 (age 58) South Philadelphia, Pennsylvania, U.S.

Professional wrestling career
- Ring name(s): Romeo Valentino; Romeo Valentine
- Billed height: 6 ft 2 in (1.88 m)
- Billed weight: 227 lb (103 kg)
- Billed from: Philadelphia, Pennsylvania; Essex, Maryland (by way of Venice, Italy); West Palm Beach, Florida
- Trained by: Duane Gill
- Debut: 1990
- Retired: 2006

Romeo Valentino (born July 8, 1968) is a retired American professional wrestler and promoter. He competed in a number of independent promotions in the Mid-Atlantic and Southeastern United States during the 1990s and early 2000s including American Commonwealth Wrestling, CyberSpace Wrestling Federation, The Bad Crew's Eastern Wrestling Federation, Music City Wrestling, National Championship Wrestling, NWA New Jersey, Ozark Mountain Wrestling, and the World Wrestling Alliance. He also had a brief stint as a preliminary wrestler in World Championship Wrestling.

He was a major star in Maryland Championship Wrestling and the Mid-Eastern Wrestling Federation, two of the biggest Mid-Atlantic promotions in the late 1990s. Often called "The Cornerstone of MCW", Valentino was one of the promotion's top heel performers during its early years. He was the inaugural MCW Heavyweight Champion, winning the title three times, a former MCW Rage Television Champion, and a two-time MCW Tag Team Champion with "Wiseguy" Jimmy Cicero and "Soda Pop" Ronnie Zukko. Valentino was inducted into the MCW Hall of Fame shortly after his retirement in 2006.

In the MEWF, Valentino was the last-ever MEWF Heavyweight Champion, losing the belt to MCW Heavyweight Champion Danny Doring in a unification match at the 5th annual Shane Shamrock Memorial Cup in 2003, as well as a former MEWF Maryland Unified Mid-Atlantic Champion. As one-half of The Goodfellows (or Goodfellas) with Dino Casanova and as a member of Menace 2 Society with Adam Flash and Quinn Nash, he twice held the MEWF Tag Team Championship. He also teamed with Don Bass, Tom Brandi, and "Doomsday" Danny Rose at various times in his career.

== Early life ==
Valentino was born in South Philadelphia, Pennsylvania on July 8, 1968. A fan of pro wrestling growing up, he was encouraged to join Larry Sharpe's famed Monster Factory after hearing about the school on the WCAO talk radio program The Larry Katz Show. Valentino was put in contact with his future trainer Duane Gill after calling the show and began working out at the facility. He made his professional debut against Ricky Blues on August 11, 1990.

== Professional wrestling career ==
=== Early career (1990–1994) ===
After a few years wrestling on the local independent circuit, Valentino began teaming with Dino Casanova as The Goodfellas (or The Goodfellows) in the summer of 1993. In the Mid-Eastern Wrestling Federation, they defeated The Outrageous Ones (Quinn Nash and Ricki Lane) for the MEWF Tag Team Championship. They also challenged the Lords of Pain for the WWA Tag Team Championship in Essex, Maryland on April 9, 1994. Three months later, they wrestled "Superstar" Johnny Gunn and Tommy Dreamer at Sauconfest '94 for the then vacant American Commonwealth Wrestling tag team championship. The Goodfellas spent the few years teaming together in the Mid-Atlantic region wrestling for NWA New Jersey, Pennsylvania Championship Wrestling and the World Wrestling Alliance.

=== World Championship Wrestling (1995) ===
In early-1995, Dino Casanova and Romeo Valentino began wrestling for World Championship Wrestling making their debut at the February 2nd edition of WCW Worldwide against The Fantastics (Bobby Fulton and Tommy Rogers) at Walt Disney World in Orlando, Florida. Several weeks later, the team appeared in the main event match on WCW Main Event against Stars & Stripes (Marcus Bagwell and The Patriot). WCW World Heavyweight Champion Big Van Vader, after an on-air argument with Eric Bischoff, interjected himself in the match attacking all four men. This was included as a dark match at SuperBrawl V at the Baltimore Arena that same night. Valentino made a few appearances after the PPV, most notably, wrestling Sting on WCW Pro (February 21) and teaming with Ricky Santana against The Nasty Boys (Brian Knobbs and Jerry Sags) on WCW Saturday Night (April 13). His last appearance was on WCW Saturday Night against Brian Pillman on June 17, 1995.

=== Independent circuit (1995–1997) ===
Shortly before splitting up with Casanova, Valentino began wrestling in singles competition. On February 26, 1995, Valentino lost to Johnny Gunn in a match to crown the first MEWF European Champion. The following year, he joined Adam Flash and Quinn Nash to form Menace 2 Society. The group defeated Axl Rotten and Corporal Punishment for the MEWF Tag Team Championship in Baltimore on September 13, 1996, however, they lost the belts to The Headbangers (Mosh and Thrasher) in College Park, Maryland a day later. Nevertheless, Valentino and his partners remained together for another few weeks. Competing under the Freebird Rule, they challenged other teams, most notably, former tag team champions Darkside (Glen Osborne and Rockin' Rebel) on October 13, 1996. At the end of 1997, Valentino made his debut in Music City Wrestling where he wrestled J. C. Ice at Tennessee Homecoming in Nashville on November 27, 1997. He subsequently faced Rex King and Shane Eden on MCW TV before leaving the promotion.

=== Maryland Championship Wrestling (1998–1999) ===
In the summer of 1998, Valentino joined Maryland Championship Wrestling, which had split from the Mid-Eastern Wrestling Federation, and appeared on the 1st annual Shane Shamrock Memorial Cup to wrestle Mark "The Shark" Shrader. That fall, he was among the participants in the championship tournament to crown the first MCW Heavyweight Champion. On October 11, Valentino defeated Corporal Punishment in the tournament finals to become the promotion's first heavyweight champion. He successfully defended his title in rematches against Cpl. Punishment which included a tag team match with Tom Brandi against Cpl. Punishment and Terry Funk at MCW's "Legends Come to Town" show in Glen Burnie, Maryland on November 4, 1998. After a two-month reign, Valentino finally lost the heavyweight title to King Kong Bundy in Denton, Maryland on December 4, 1998. He was voted "Wrestler of the Year" at MCW's first-ever year-end award ceremony. Valentino regained the belt from Bundy in Glen Burnie on January 7, 1999. During this time Dino Devine became his personal bodyguard. He met Corporal Punishment in a no-disqualification match at the Volunteer Fire Hall in Denton on February 18. An alliance of sorts was made with Tom Brandi and manager Royce C. Profit during the show and they helped Valentino win his match against Cpl. Punishment in the main event. On March 12, he scored an impressive yet controversial victory over Stevie Richards at Stephen Decatur High School in Berlin, Maryland; Richards initially appeared to have won the title, however, Dino Devine put Valentino's leg on the ropes while the referee was distracted and the match was restarted ending with Valentino pinning his opponent. His second reign was ended by Headbanger Mosh four weeks later.

At Break the Barrier, an interpromotional show featuring wrestlers from 15 different independent promotions from throughout the United States, held at Philadelphia's Viking Hall, Valentino represented MCW by challenging Headbanger Mosh for the MCW Heavyweight Championship. Four days later, Valentino wrestled Tito Santana at a National Championship Wrestling show in Red Lion, Pennsylvania. On May 21, Valentino wrestled The Blue Meanie (with Bobcat) at a benefit show for Wheaton High School. Valentino later served as Cicero's cornerman during his match against Headbanger Mosh for the MCW Heavyweight Championship. He was scheduled to have a rematch against Headbanger Mosh the following night at North Harford High School in Pylesville, however, the champion was unable to make the show due to a WWE appearance in St. Louis. Instead, a mystery opponent was introduced later on in the show which was revealed to be WWF Light Heavyweight Champion Gillberg. Valentino tried to regain the MCW Heavyweight title in a 3-Way Dance with Mosh and Tom Brandi on June 17, but he was unable to win it back.

It was around this time that Valentino joined Royce C. Profit's "First Family", a heel stable including Tom Brandi and Jimmy Cicero, and feuded with the Family of Freaks in addition to Corporal Punishment and Axl Rotten. Valentino eventually forced Rotten to leave the promotion in a Loser Leaves Town match. On July 8, he and Cicero won the MCW Tag Team Championship from Adam Flash and The Bruiser in Dundalk. Chased by "Doomsday" Danny Rose and The Bruiser, they held the title for over four months until their loss to The Bruiser and Jerry "The King" Lawler in Owings Mills, Maryland on November 13. That fall, Valentino regained the title from The Bruiser but lost it to him in Olney, Maryland on December 4, 1999. He also made a brief appearance for Memphis Power Pro Wrestling and was part of the Allied Powers Wrestling Federation's "Diceman Forever", a memorial show for Robert Hornack, wrestling Corporal Punishment and The Bruiser in a 3-Way Dance for the MCW Heavyweight Championship.

=== National Championship Wrestling (2000) ===
Valentino was also a mainstay for Darren Wyse's National Championship Wrestling promotion based in Red Lion, Pennsylvania. On February 5, 2000, he took part in a three-way steel cage and ladder match with Adam Flash and Danny Rose at the Fairmount Arena for the NCW Heavyweight Championship. The match is considered by the promotion to be one of the greatest championship bouts in its history. Two months later, Valentino faced Flash in another ladder match for the Eastern Wrestling Federation's "Reading Invasion" in Reading, Pennsylvania. At the end of the year, Valentino and Danny Rose teamed up against Mukie and "Surfer" Ray Odyssey.

=== Maryland Championship Wrestling (2000) ===
On March 18, 2000, Valentino wrestled WWF Hall of Famer George "The Animal" Steele in Emmitsburg, Maryland. He also faced former stablemates Tom Brandi and Jimmy Cicero, Gregory Martin, and Ronnie Zukko during the spring. On June 10, Valentino had a rematch with Steele at an MCW show near Ocean City, Maryland. That same night, Valentino won a battle royal after Orlando Jordan and Ronnie Zukko eliminated each other. A month later at the 2nd annual Shane Shamrock Memorial Cup, Valentino wrestled Julio Fantastico.

=== Independent circuit (2000) ===
Valentino made several appearances for the MEWF that summer. Valentino and Dino Casanova, with midget wrestler Dink as special guest referee, lost to Morgus the Maniac and The Clown at the Harry Grove Stadium in Frederick, Maryland on July 17, 2000. The following night at the Summer Sizzler supercard, he and Valentino wrestled The Tokyo Terrors for the MEWF Tag Team Championship but were disqualified when Thrasher attempted to interfere. This was the last-ever appearance of The Goodfellas as a tag team.

On October 25, 2000, Valentino wrestled T. Rantula on Far North Wrestling's "Return of the Monster" show; he returned to Irwin two months later to face Don Montoya in the main event.

=== Maryland Championship Wrestling (2000–2003) ===
==== Teaming and feuding with Ronnie Zukko (2000–2002) ====
In late-2000, Valentino formed a tag team with "Soda Pop" Ronnie Zukko. On November 17, 2000, Valentino and Zukko wrestled Orlando and Marcus Jordan, The Ghetto Mafia, and TQM in a four-way match in Odenton, Maryland. Weeks later, he also wrestled his former bodyguard Dino Divine.

On February 21, 2001, Valentino and Ronnie Zukko defeated Dino Divine and Christopher Carmichael for the MCW Tag Team titles. They defended the title for over three months before losing the belts to The Ghetto Mafia (2-Dope and Sydeswype) at the middle school in Middle River, Maryland on June 9. This was a "Lockdown on 8th Ave Streetfight", which included ladders, trash cans, cookie sheets, and steel chairs, also including The Holy Rollers (Earl the Pearl and Rich Myers). Valentino eliminated The Holy Rollers when he pinned Earl the Pearl, however, Myers interfered in the match moments later allowing 2-Dope of The Ghetto Mafia to pin Valentino and win the titles. Afterwards, The Holy Rollers took the house mic and bragged "if they couldn't have the title, neither could Romeo and Ronnie". In a rematch held on July 18 at the 3rd annual Shane Shamrock Memorial Cup, billed as a "Triangle Keys on a Pole Streetfight", The Holy Rollers ended up walking away with the titles; according to the stipulations, one man had to climb a pole and grab a key which unlocked a box containing the tag team belts. The two received another shot at the champions in Bel Air, Maryland a week later, this time in a 3-Way match with Christian York and Joey Matthews, but failed to win the titles. That summer, Valentino also teamed with "Doomsday" Danny Rose in Darren Wyse's National Championship Wrestling in Red Lion, Pennsylvania where they wrestled teams such as Big Dick Dudley & The Patriot and Balls Mahoney & Ruckus.

After nearly a year as a tag team, Valentino turned on his partner during their match against TQM at MCW's New Beginning on October 30, 2001. On November 3, he interfered in a match between Zukko and then MCW Television Champion Marcus Jordan in Paw Paw, West Virginia, distracting Zukko by grabbing Candi's hair, and allowing Jordan to pin his opponent with his "Snap Shot" finisher; later that night he was challenged by 2Dope of The Ghetto Mafia, due to his attack on Candi, but defeated his one-time rival. Following the match, Valentino challenged Zukko to a rematch after his defeat in Chestertown earlier. Valentino's "heel turn" and feud with his former tag team partner resulted in being voted "Most Hated Wrestler of the Year".

The Valentino-Zukko feud came to a head on January 30, 2002, at special "RAGE TV" tribute show for Russ Haas, when a match between the two men would win the contract of Zukko's valet Candie. Valentino ended up pinning his opponent with a roll-up after an attempt by Candie to interfere backfired. Had he lost the match Valentino would have been forced to leave the promotion.

In the next few weeks, Valentino taunted Zukko by treating Candie as his personal servant and publicly embarrassing her (e.g. forcing the pin-up girl to come to the ring dressed in full-length pajamas). He also took over her monthly "Candi's Box" column on the promotion's official website to insult her fans. Candie managed to gain a small measure of revenge by costing him his match against Amazing Red Upset that he had lost to the rookie cruiserweight, Valentino challenged The S.A.T. (Joel Maximo and Jose Maximo) to a Triple Threat match at the RAGE TV Arena. To prevent Candie from interfering in his match, Valentino hired her rival Tara to watch her. He ended up winning his match against The S.A.T. when Joel Maximo accidentally superkicked Candie and Valentino was able to pin Joel with his "One Night Stand" powerslam finisher. On May 22, Valentino defeated "The Supermodel" Marcus Jordan at MCW's "A Tribute To Legends" for the MCW Rage Television Championship; because Valentino owned Candie's contract, he put up her career in exchange for a title shot. On June 21, he successfully defended his title against Qenaan Creed, however, he lost to Kelly Bell later on in the show.

On July 17, 2002, Valentino and Zukko faced each other at the 4th annual Shane Shamrock Memorial Cup in a match which would end the eight-month feud between the two. Prior to the event, Valentino had MCW Commissioner Michael Black sanction a mixed tag team match between him and Candi against Ronnie Zukko and Tara. The stipulations were that if Valentino and Candie won then Zukko would have to leave MCW but if Zukko won then Valentino would have to give up Candi's contract. The two defeated Ronnie Zukko and Tara with Candi turning on Zukko, by hitting him with a steel chair, and revealing that the feud had been an elaborate ruse to humiliate Zukko. Three days later, Valentino and Candie wrestled Earl the Pearl and Alexis Laree in a mixed tag team match for Beautiful Babes of Wrestling in Martinsburg, West Virginia.

==== Final year in MCW (2003) ====
Valentino subsequently formed a brief alliance with MCW Heavyweight Champion The Bruiser. On September 18, 2002, he teamed with The Bruiser in a tag match against Danny Doring and Chris Chetti. The match ended in a no-contest when Chetti turned on his partner.

He eventually lost the MCW Rage TV title to Joey Matthews on January 29, 2003. On March 12, Valentino lost to Danny Doring at MCW's 2003 awards show. He and Bruiser lost to Chad Bowman and Dino Divine in a tag team match two months later. Valentino was also competing for the rival MEWF during this time and, on May 3, he won the promotion's heavyweight title. His championship reign was short-lived however. At MCW's final show, the 5th annual Shane Shamrock Memorial Cup, Valentino lost to Danny Doring, unifying the MEWF and MCW Heavyweight titles, in a three-way match also involving Chris Chetti.

=== Independent circuit (2003) ===
Valentino spent much of 2003 working for various promotions on the East Coast. He made a number of appearances for Hardway Wrestling's syndicated television show that included a "very bloody" match against The Butcher. On the May 9th edition of Hardway Wrestling TV in Coplay, Pennsylvania, Valentino and Adam Flash faced Mongoose and Mike Preston. On September 13, Valentino wrestled Preston at a CyberSpace Wrestling Federation event in Rahway, New Jersey. On November 1, 2003, Valentino lost to Al Snow at an NCW show.

=== Mid-Eastern Wrestling Federation (2004) ===
Valentino made a brief return to the MEWF in early 2004. He won his last title in the promotion, the MEWF Maryland Unified Mid-Atlantic Championship, after defeating "Hollywood" Bob Starr on January 11, 2004. Valentino lost the belt to Sean Patrick a month later. On March 28, in one of his last matches for the MEWF, he lost to The Bruiser in a match for the vacant heavyweight title in Dundalk, Maryland.

=== National Championship Wrestling (2004–2005) ===
On April 24, 2004, Valentino and Danny Doring battled Ruckus and Kid Kattrell for the NCW tag team titles at the M.C. Sportsplex in Red Lion, Pennsylvania. That summer, he took part in a fundraiser for Dover Area Senior High School teaming with Danny Doring against "Dirty Deeds" Darren Wyse and The Hungarian Barbarian.

=== Independent Championship Wrestling (2005) ===
Nearly two years after the close of MCW, Valentino started his own promotion, Independent Championship Wrestling, and held a tournament to determine the first ICW Heavyweight Champion in June 2005; the participants included Andrew Ryker, Derek Frazier, Qenaan Creed, and himself. Valentino's promotion ceased operations after three months when Dan McDevitt began promoting events in nearby Fort Meade under the "Fort Meade Wrestling" banner. On October 1, 2005, he teamed with The Patriot in a tag team match against Eagle and King Kahlua (with Royce C. Profit). Prior to the match, Valentino announced to the crowd that he had a brother in serving in Iraq and decided not to wrestle out of respect for the service members in attendance. Their opponent's manager Royce C. Profit taunted Valentino and eventually instructed his men to attack. He and The Patriot ended up defeating Eagle and King Kahlua and at the end of the match tossed Profit out of the ring to the concrete floor. Joined by his old valet Candie, they defeated Eagle and King Kaluha in a rematch in Odenton, Maryland the next night.

=== National Championship Wrestling (2006) ===
By 2006, Valentino was back in National Championship Wrestling where he was billed as one of its biggest stars. He also worked shows for Maximum Xtreme Pro Wrestling in bouts against Alex Pourteau and Bobby Hopkins, Jr. during mid-October. Valentino's last match for NCW took place on November 4, 2006, at the Hannah Penn Middle School in York, Pennsylvania. He teamed with Cotton the Bad Butcher to challenge the then newly crowned NCW Tag Team Champions Marshal Law and The Luvbug but were unsuccessful in winning the belts. Shortly before his retirement that year, Valentino was inducted into the MCW Hall of Fame. He was unable to attend the ceremony but made an official statement on his official MySpace page thanking the promoter, wrestlers, and fans.

== Championships and accomplishments ==
- Maryland Championship Wrestling
  - MCW Heavyweight Championship (3 times)
  - MCW Rage Television Championship (1 time)
  - MCW Tag Team Championship (2 times) – with Jimmy Cicero and Ronnie Zukko
  - MCW Heavyweight Championship Tournament (1998)
  - MCW Wrestler of the Year (1998)
  - MCW Most Hated Wrestler of the Year (2001)
  - MCW Hall of Fame (Class of 2006)
- Mid-Eastern Wrestling Federation
  - MEWF Heavyweight Championship (1 time)
  - MEWF Maryland Unified Mid-Atlantic Championship (1 time)
  - MEWF Tag Team Championship (2 times) – with Dino Casanova, Adam Flash and Quinn Nash
- Pro Wrestling Illustrated
  - Ranked No. 326 of the top 500 singles wrestlers in the PWI 500 in 1999
