= Rich Myers (wrestler) =

American professional wrestler (born 1973)

Personal information
- Born: Richard Myers; May 25, 1973 (age 53) Baltimore, Maryland, United States

Professional wrestling career
- Ring name(s): Rich Myers; Richard Myers; Ramblin Rich; Rich Caryle
- Billed height: 5 ft 10 in (178 cm)
- Billed weight: 209 lb (95 kg)
- Trained by: Larry Sharpe
- Debut: 1990
- Retired: 2019

Richard Myers (born May 25, 1973) is an American retired professional wrestler who is best known for his appearances in World Wrestling Federation, Mid-Eastern Wrestling Federation and Maryland Championship Wrestling.

== Professional wrestling career ==
Myers made his debut for Mid-Eastern Wrestling Federation in 1991. He made his debut for the WWF Superstars on November 24, 1992 (aired on December 19) losing to Yokozuna. From 1993 to 1995 he fought against Lex Luger, Razor Ramon, Shawn Michaels, Bam Bam Bigelow, Jeff Jarrett, Owen Hart, Diesel, and Henry Godwinn. His last match was a lost to Skip on November 21, 1995 (aired on December 16) on Superstars.

From 1992 to 1998, he teamed with Jimmy Jannetty as the Marvelous Inc. winning the MEWF Tag Team Championship four times.

He returned to the WWF for one night on May 11, 1998, losing to Barry Windham on Shotgun Saturday Night.

From 1999 to 2012, Myers for worked for Maryland Championship Wrestling. In 2007, he reunited with Jimmy Jannetty. They disbanded in 2008. From 2007 to 2014, he worked for West Virginia's Primal Conflict Wrestling. He retired from wrestling 2019.

Myers trained Wes Lee.

== Championships and accomplishments ==
- Maryland Championship Wrestling
  - MCW Tag Team Championship (3 times) – with Earl the Pearl (3)
- Mid-Eastern Wrestling Federation
  - MEWF Light Heavyweight Championship (1 time)
  - MEWF Tag Team Championship (6 times) – with Jimmy Jannetty (4), Adrian Hall (1) and Earl the Pearl (1)
- NWA Jersey
  - NWA Jersey Tag Team Championship (1 time) with Earl the Pearl
