= Ricky Blues =

American professional wrestler, trainer

Personal information
- Born: William Perry Blake III Baltimore, Maryland, U.S.

Professional wrestling career
- Ring name(s): Ricky Blues; Ricky Blues, Sr. Akuma Bushido
- Billed height: 6 ft 0 in (1.83 m)
- Billed weight: 231 lb (105 kg)
- Trained by: Barry Hardy; Duane Gill; Axl Rotten; Rip Sawyer; Dave Casanova
- Debut: August 3, 1990
- Retired: 2000

William Perry Blake III, better known by the ring name "Hard Rock" Ricky Blues, is an American semi-retired professional wrestler and trainer who competed in the East Coast and Mid-Atlantic independent circuit during the 1990s and 2000s. He is regarded as a pioneering cruiserweight wrestler and dominated the Baltimore-area, especially in the Mid-Eastern Wrestling Federation and Maryland Championship Wrestling, in the early to mid-1990s.

He also wrestled for Atlantic States Wrestling Association, David Leehy's Virginia Wrestling Association, Dick Caricofe's National Wrestling League, Universal Independent Wrestling, the Wrestling Independent Network, NWA New Jersey, Atlantic Wrestling Federation in Pennsylvania, Larry Sharpe's World Wrestling Association, and for Doug Flex and Brick Bronsky in International Pro Wrestling.

He was the first MEWF Heavyweight and Light Heavyweight Champion. He defeated Rich Myers in 1992 in Parkville, Maryland to win the UIW Light Heavyweight championship, and at one time held three light heavyweight/cruiser championship's for three separate promotions simultaneously. In 1995 he defeated Mark Shrader for his second reign as the MEWF Light Heavyweight Champion. He was also a 3-time MEWF Tag Team Champion with Nick Tarentino, Flexx Wheeler (1997) and The New Patriot (1999). He and Nick Tarentino, as Sonic Express, were a successful tag team during his early career and together won both the MEWF and WWA Tag Team titles in 1993.

Blues influenced a number of future high-flying cruiserweights and, as an instructor at the Brainbusters Wrestling School, helped train future Ring of Honor star Ruckus. He was an instructor for the Baltimore Monster Factory, the MCW school Bone Breakers, and Gillberg's Academy of Pro Wrestling. In 2011, he was inducted into the Maryland Wrestling Hall of Fame.

== Career ==
=== Mid-Eastern Wrestling Federation (1991–1999) ===
Trained at the Baltimore Monster Factory beginning in February 1990 by Barry Hardy, Duane Gill, Axl Rotten, Rip Sawyer and Dave Casanova, Ricky Blues made his professional debut on August 3, 1990 in promoter Jim Kettner's Delaware based East Coast Wrestling Association as part of the tag team The Chicago Hitmen with Steve Valentino. He spent his first year in various East Coast and Mid-Atlantic independent promotions. In 1991 the Universal Independent Wrestling organization earned a television program on Maryland local channel 13 WJZTV, and Blues performed as a masked wrestler called Watsumi The Rising Sun, where he displayed his aerial wrestling style combined with martial arts to become a company and fan favorite. His early feud, as Watsumi, against The Insatiable Adrian Hall was one of the defining feuds of that era. The following year, as UIW folded, he returned to the Ricky Blues character, and began wrestling for the Mid-Eastern Wrestling Federation and, on October 11, 1991, appeared on its debut show in Pasadena, Maryland where he defeated Adrian Hall to become the first Light Heavyweight Champion. Though he was stripped of the title within a few months, he beat Agent Orange in Odenton on January 18, 1992, to be crowned the first MEWF Heavyweight Champion.

Later that year, Blues began teaming with Nick Tarentino as Sonic Express. On October 23, they unsuccessfully challenged Leather & Lace (Rich Carlisle and Adrian Hall) in Essex, Maryland for the then vacant MEWF Tag Team Championship, however, they won the titles a month later in Gaithersburg. They had faced Rich Carlisle and Ricki Lane who substituted for an injured Adrian Hall. After a near 4-month reign, they lost the titles to The Outrageous Ones (Ricki Lane and Quinn Nash) in Dundalk on March 6, 1993. Two months later in Larry Sharpe's World Wrestling Association, they defeated Chris Evans & Chris Candido in Williamstown, New Jersey for the promotion's tag team titles. They dropped the titles to The Super Jocks (Ed Atlas & Chris Weider) in Clementon on June 4, 1993.

Over the next few years, Blues would have memorable bouts against some of the region's top stars including "Stone Cold" Chad Austin, Corporal Punishment, Georgia Lightning Jimmy Jannetty and Steve Corino. In the early 1990s he had career defining matches with the Lightning Kid for WIN and WWA, where they battled over Blues' WIN Atlantic State Light Heavyweight Championship. In the mid-1990s he briefly donned the Watsumi mantle again, which the Japanese wrestling press called Akuma Bushido, and had a brief feud in NWA New Jersey with Abuddah Singh, who later became Balls Mahoney in ECW. Later, on November 14, 1998, Blues lost to Adam Flash in Hampstead, Maryland in a match for the vacant MEWF Mid-Atlantic Championship. In 1998 Blues and tag team partner Flexx Wheeler, under the tutelage of manager Jim Cornette, unsuccessfully chased after the MEWF tag team championships held by Max Thrasher and Dino Casanova, and their manager Wolfman Baker collectively known as Good, Bad and Ugly. A year later, Blues and The New Patriot defeated Thrasher and Casanova for the MEWF Tag Team titles on November 13, 1999.

=== Maryland Championship Wrestling and retirement (2000) ===
Around this time, creative differences and salary disputes with the MEWF caused Corporal Punishment and Mark Shrader to leave the promotion and took half its roster with them to form Maryland Championship Wrestling (MCW). By early-2000, Blues began wrestling for MCW facing Christian York and Joey Matthews in singles matches in April. In both these matches, Blues was noticeably distracted by fans and, in his April 15 match against Matthews, he left the ring in mid-match to argue with hecklers at ringside.

Blues took on MCW Heavyweight Champion The Bruiser two months later at a special MCW show near Ocean City, Maryland on June 10, 2000. Though Blues and The Bruiser headlined the show, WWF legends George "the Animal" Steele, Mae Young and The Fabulous Moolah made an appearance as did Xtreme Pro Wrestling valet Chastity. On July 19, Blues wrestled Balls Mahoney at the 2000 Shane Shamrock Memorial Cup in Glen Burnie. Over the summer, Blues also had a series of matches against Adam Flash. One of these, a No-DQ match in Ocean City, was later featured on The Indies: The Best Of 1997 - 2000 video series.

On August 25, a rematch against The Bruiser in Odenton saw Blues pin the Bruiser, but he did not win the MCW title because of interference by Cpl. Punishment. The next month in Glen Burnie, he wrestled Gillberg at Micheal's Eighth Avenue on September 27, 2000. After the match, Blues was approached by manager Platinum Nat who offered his services to "guide [Blues] to the next level". Blues accepted and was welcomed into the manager's "heel" stable, The Congregation, with The Holy Rollers (Earl the Pearl & Rich Myers). However, Blues did not remain with The Congregation for very long as he soon went into retirement by the end of the year

=== Return to MCW (2009–2011) ===
After nearly a decade, Blues formally returned to MCW at a special ceremony called Night of the Legends, held at the New Green Room in Dundalk. Later that night, he defeated his old rival Agent Orange at "Legends of Maryland" on November 7, 2009. Blues made several appearances on MCW events in 2010 and 2011, teaming with his son, R K Blues JR in a series of matches against Agent Orange, and then later, old foe Rip Sawyer, of the Cream Team. At the MCW "Xtreme Rules" supercard he was defeated by his son Ricky Blues Jr. on April 4, 2010, after a long feud that began on MCW Rage TV webisode program that was filmed at Gillberg's Academy of Pro Wrestling.

In 2011 Ricky Blues was inducted into the Maryland Professional Wrestling Hall of Fame, at a special event in Dundalk, Maryland, alongside fellow inductees Tom Brandi (Johnny Gunn/the Patriot), Pro Wrestling Illustrated luminary Bill Apter, the Holy Rollers tag team Earl the Pearl Hart and Ramblin' Rich Myers, and Dan McDevitt (Corporal Punishment).

== Writing career ==
In 2010 Ricky Blues, under his given name, became a published author with the novel To Kill The Town. It is the story of independent professional wrestling in Baltimore, Maryland from the mid-1980s through 2000. The story gives the insider's view of all the triumphs and tragedies of those that blazed the trail of the Mid Atlantic hotbed.

In 2013 Ricky Blues founded the organization called PIN, or Pioneers of the Independent Networks. It is a video-webisode series published weekly that is the living embodiment of the novel, To Kill The Town, and is specifically dedicated to archiving and reliving the magic of the promotions, wrestlers and stories of the mid-Atlantic Indies from their birth in the mid 1980s through the heyday of the early 2000s. It is maintained as part of the Facebook and Youtube communities.

=== List of works ===
- (1999) Lykanthropus. Vantage Press. ISBN 0-533-12809-9
- (2002) The Blood and the Seed. AuthorHouse. ISBN 1-40332845-5 (self-published)
- (2005) S.H.E.L.L.: Sub-Human Experimental Life Laboratory. Trafford Publishing. ISBN 1-41205629-2 (self-published).
- (2006) ESOTERIC. Outskirts Press. ISBN 1-59800-522-7
- (2010) To Kill The Town. Infinity Publishing. ISBN 0-7414-6206-0.

== Personal life ==
Blues and his wife live in Spring Grove, Pennsylvania with their three children.

== Championships and accomplishments ==
- Atlantic States Wrestling Alliance
  - ASWA Junior Heavyweight Championship (1 time)
- Maryland Championship Wrestling
  - MCW Hall of Fame (Class of 2011)
- Maryland Wrestling Federation
  - MWF Hall of Fame (Class of 2015)
- Mid-Eastern Wrestling Federation
  - MEWF Heavyweight Championship (1 time)
  - MEWF Light Heavyweight Championship (2 times)
  - MEWF Tag Team Championship (3 times) - with Nick Tarentino, Flexx Wheeler and The New Patriot
- Primal Conflict Wrestling
  - Mid-Atlantic Hall of Honors (Class of 2016)
- Universal Independent Wrestling
  - UIW Light Heavyweight Championship (1 time)
- Wrestling Independent Network
  - WIN Atlantic States Light Heavyweight Championship (1 time)
- World Wrestling Association
  - WWA Tag Team Championship (1 time) - with Nick Tarentino
