= Mark Shrader =

American wrestler (born 1967)

Personal information
- Born: September 9, 1967 (age 58) United States
- Website: Mark Shrader on Myspace

Professional wrestling career
- Ring name(s): Mark Shrader; Mark Schrader; Joe College
- Billed height: 5 ft 10 in (1.78 m)
- Billed weight: 212 lb (96 kg)
- Billed from: Ocean City, Maryland
- Trained by: Duane Gill
- Debut: June 22, 1993
- Retired: July 16, 2003

Mark Shrader (born September 9, 1967) is a retired American professional wrestler, trainer and promoter who competed in numerous independent promotions throughout the United States during the 1990s and early 2000s. Among these included Atlantic Terror Championship Wrestling, the Future Wrestling Alliance, East Coast Wrestling Association, Cueball Carmichael's Independent Professional Wrestling Alliance, Doug Flex's International Pro Wrestling, and the Mid-Eastern Wrestling Federation. Shrader also briefly appeared as a preliminary wrestler for the World Wrestling Federation.

A popular light heavyweight on the Mid-Atlantic and East Coast "indy circuit", he won several regional championship titles and was also a participant in the 1998 ECWA Super 8 Tournament. In addition, he is a former MEWF Heavyweight Champion, a two-time MEWF Light Heavyweight Champion, and MEWF Tag Team Champion with Devon Storm and Corporal Punishment. He also formed notable tag teams with a number of independent stars on the East Coast including The Darkside Rebel, Cueball Carmichael, Glenn Osbourne, Boo Bradley, Joey Matthews, Mike Quackenbush, Christian York, and Reckless Youth.

In 1998, Shrader and then partner Dan McDevitt established Maryland Championship Wrestling which became the top wrestling promotion in the state of Maryland, and one of the most popular independent organizations in the United States, until its close in 2003. The two also operated a wrestling school, the "Bone Breakers Pro Wrestling Training Center", in Halethorpe, Maryland which trained WWE's Lita, Mickie James, Orlando Jordan and Florida Championship Wrestling star Calvin Raines. At MCW's debut show, his match against "Irish Ironman" Shane Shamrock for the MCW Light Heavyweight Championship, also involving Christian York, Joey Matthews, Quinn Nash, and Earl the Pearl and ending with his tapping out to Shamrock's "Irish cloverleaf" submission hold, was voted by fans as "Match of the Year".

== Early life ==
Born on September 9, 1967, Mark Shrader was adopted by a foster family shortly after his birth and grew up in the Edmondson Heights neighborhood of Baltimore, Maryland. Beginning in 1977, the 10-year-old Shrader began competing in amateur wrestling, an activity he would continue up until his teenage years as a champion high school wrestler. In junior high he served as treasurer of the student council and later, while attending Woodlawn High School, became president of the local church youth group. After his graduation from Woodlawn High in 1985, he began working for a pest control company. He attended Catonsville Community College, studying to be an interpreter for the hearing impaired, and was later a photo editor for the college newspaper; it was in this position, according to Shrader, that he was nearly expelled from the school for photographs he had taken of Joan Jett.

In 1990, Shrader lost his job as an exterminator. Unable to find work in Ocean City, he spent the summer "pool hustling" before moving back to Baltimore and was hired by Chi-Chi's restaurant. A year later, he traveled to Key West, Florida. He returned to Ocean City the following summer, where he continued hustling pool, and then returned to Baltimore again to work for a new exterminator company as a service manager. It was around this time that Shrader became interested in becoming a professional wrestler. He found a wrestling school, where he was trained by Duane Gill, and made his pro debut on June 22, 1993.

== Professional wrestling career ==
=== Early career ===
Shrader spent his rookie year wrestling on the indy circuit for various promotions in the Mid-Atlantic region under the name "Joe College". One such organization was Lou Martin's Atlantic States Wrestling Alliance. His first major match was against another young wrestler, "The Irish Gentleman" Shane Shamrock, in Parkville, Maryland for the then vacant ASWA Light Heavyweight Championship on September 14, 1993, a match which he lost. One month later, Shrader teamed with Watsumi the Rising Sun and Chad Austin in a 6-man elimination tag team match against the American Ninja, Johnny Paradise and The Comet at Kenwood High School in Essex, Maryland; though he and Watsumi were eliminated from the contest, their team won the match when Austin ended up as the sole survivor.

=== Mid-Eastern Wrestling Federation (1994–1997) ===
In 1994, Shrader started wrestling for the Mid-Eastern Wrestling Federation. It was at this time that he stated using his more familiar moniker "The Shark", a reference to his "pool hustling" days, and whose in-ring persona similarly portrayed an ex-pool shark complete with a pool cue he used as a foreign object. He won his first major singles title later that year defeating Shane Shamrock to win the vacant MEWF Light Heavyweight Championship in Catonsville on November 11, 1994. A year later, he won the title a second time from The Cat Burglar before dropping it to Dino Casanova on March 17, 1996; among the opponents he face during his second reign included Chad Austin. When the title was vacated a month later, he wrestled Earl the Pearl to decide the new champion but was unsuccessful in defeating his opponent. Despite this loss, he would go on to have impressive matches against larger opponents like Knuckles Zandwich and Corporal Punishment during the next few months. On June 7, 1996, he defeated Quinn Nash (substituting for Earl the Pearl) in a championship tournament to become the first light heavyweight champion for Cueball Carmichael's Independent Professional Wrestling Alliance in Alexandria, Virginia.

By the fall of 1996, Shrader began challenging MEWF Heavyweight Champion Axl Rotten on MEWF television. Rotten ultimately agreed to wrestle the light heavyweight, however, their first match was marred by outside interference from "Judge" Jeff Jones who hit Shrader with a steel chair allowing Rotten pin his opponent. A rematch between the two was held in Gaithersburg, Maryland on September 13, and saw Shrader score a surprising victory over Rotten and his winning the MEWF Heavyweight Championship. He re-lost the title to Rotten after a near 3-month title reign, during which time he defeated the Cat Burglar, when the MEWF returned to Gaithersburg on November 23, 1996. At the MEWF's "Winter Wars" supercard, Shrader wrestled Chris Candido. He also won back the IPWA Light Heavyweight Championship from Earl the Pearl, Shrader having previously surrendered the belt after his MEWF Heavyweight victory, and held it for five months until his defeat by Julio Sanchez in Lenoir, North Carolina on March 22, 1997.

Earlier that month, Shrader was paired with Devon Storm to wrestle the team of Rockin' Rebel and Thomas "The Inchworm" Rodman for the vacant MEWF Tag Team Championship. Shortly after winning the belts, the two returned to Baltimore for successful title defenses against The Bad Crew and The Headbangers (Mosh and Thrasher) in April, and Julio Sanchez & "Hollywood" Bobby Starr in June. They continued to remain champions until June 29, when they were beaten by Steve Corino and "The Wiseguy" Jimmy Cicero in Allentown, Pennsylvania. Schrader quickly returned to Allentown where he regained the belts with another partner, Corporal Punishment, but lost the titles back to Corino and Cicero in Baltimore on August 10, 1997. He and Corporal Punishment made another attempt to win back the tag team belts, wrestling the champions in a 3-way dance with The Bad Street Boys (Joey Matthews & Christian York) on October 23, with the Bad Street Boys walking out as the new champions. It was later called one of the "wildest matches in MEWF history". Returning to singles competition soon after, he wrestled in a ladder match against Adam Flash and Quinn Nash for the MEWF Light Heavyweight Championship on November 15, 1997. Other opponents he would face during the year included Ace Darling, and Christian York, the latter taking place in IPWA and Doug Flex's International Pro Wrestling. One of the Shrader-York bouts was featured in RF Video's "Best of IPW, Vol. 1".

=== Bone Breakers and the independent circuit (1997–1998) ===
That same year, Shrader partnered with fellow MEWF wrestler Corporal Punishment to start Maryland's first permanent wrestling school, the "Bone Breakers Pro Wrestling Training Center", in Halethorpe, Maryland; McDevitt had originally gone to then MEWF booker Axl Rotten proposing a partnership in the new venture, who declined the offer, before Shrader expressed interest and eventually formed Sharkorp Inc. as a parent company for their business venture. Their students would eventually include future WWE stars Lita, Mickie James, and Orlando Jordan. Shrader himself was the main trainer for ECWA Super 8 Tournament winner Aden Chambers as well as having worked with independent wrestlers Dustin Tarr and Rob Noxious. He also feuded with two of his students, Gregory Martin and Qeenan Creed, eventually forming a tag team called The Fin Twins with the former.

Shrader wrestled on the World Wrestling Federation's Shotgun Saturday Night during the spring of 1998. His first match was on January 17, 1998, against Farooq (with Kama and D-Lo Brown) at the Bryce Jordan Center in State College, Pennsylvania. He also wrestled a 6-man tag team match with Al Phillips and Brian Knighton against WWF Intercontinental Champion Rocky Maivia and the Nation of Domination (Mark Henry and D-Lo Brown) at Philadelphia's CoreStates Center three months later.

He also began touring the Delaware-based East Coast Wrestling Association. On March 21, Shrader entered the 2nd annual ECWA Super 8 Tournament in Newport but was eliminated by Lance Diamond in the opening rounds. He returned in September to wrestle Devon Storm and Mike Quackenbush in a 3-way dance.

=== Maryland Championship Wrestling (1998–1999) ===
In the spring of 1998, Shrader and Dan McDevitt opted to leave the MEWF following unresolved creative control and salary disagreements with then owners Dennis Wippercht and Tim "Lucifer" Burke. Encouraged by the support of other local wrestlers, the two decided to start their own promotion, Maryland Championship Wrestling, as an extension of their "Bone Breakers" wrestling school. Most of the active MEWF roster, including booker Axl Rotten, followed Shrader and McDevitt to their new promotion following a walkout in December 1997. Seven months later, on July 19, 1998, MCW's first show was held at Baltimore's Patapsco Arena and attended by nearly 1,200 fans. The event featured manager Jim Cornette, Little Guido, Balls Mahoney, Jerry Lynn, Crowbar, and The Headbangers. The show's success broke the longstanding monopoly over Maryland pro wrestling by the MEWF and would eventually lead to MCW becoming the top promotion in the region.

One of the show's highlights was Shrader's performance on the show. His match was a six-way dance also involving Christian York, Joey Matthews, Quinn Nash, and Earl the Pearl to decide the first MCW Light Heavyweight Champion. He and Shamrock were the final participants and the match ended with Shamrock trapping Shrader in his "Irish cloverleaf" submission hold to win the belt. The bout was later voted by fans as "Match of the Year".

Shrader was among those who later participated in the Shane Shamrock Memorial Show, a month after his loss to Shamrock, where he wrestled Romeo Valentino. Over the next six months he would also have a series of matches against Christian York and Lance Diamond; the Shrader-Diamond matches included a mixed tag team match between Shrader and manager Dawn Marie against Lance Diamond and Bobcat.

That summer, Shrader took part in a special six-man tag match with Dino Devine and Cueball Carmichael. Two of their opponents were Shrader's former students Qeenan Creed and Gregory Martin. Their mystery partner was introduced by the cornermen 98Rock disc jockeys Andy Blacksmith and John Glassman as Shrader's trainer Gillberg. Shrader was able to pin Gillberg with the help of outside interference by Carmichael.

A large part of the promotion was its fundraising activities which raised thousands of dollars for various charities and high schools in the state. It was at one of the events that Shrader, a one-time champion high school wrestler for Woodlawn High, started a feud with Baltimore County school rival Owings Mills High School. On May 16, 1999, Shrader challenged the Owings Mills wrestling team, specifically its head coach Guy Pritzker and assistant Justin Ott, to a wrestling match later that evening. If he and his partner Dino Devine won the match then they would be allowed to become OMHS's wrestling coaching staff for the 1999–2000 winter sports season. Earlier during the school week, Shrader "invaded" the cafeteria while Coach Pritzker was on lunch duty and "[slapped] him around". The high school coaches ended up winning their match against Shrader and Devine. Shrader continued to appear at Owings High during the school season, however, the feud was cut short when he lost a "loser-leaves-MCW" match.

=== East Coast Wrestling Association (1999–2000) ===
Shrader also returned to the ECWA where he won the ECWA Tag Team Championship with Christian York on March 17, 1999. Shrader's original partner was Glenn Osbourne, however, he and York scored simultaneous pinfalls during a 3-way match between The Extremists Ace Darling & Devon Storm, the Bad Street Boys (Joey Matthews & Christian York), and Mark Schrader & Glenn Osbourne, for the belts. The two rivals were forced to team with each other for over three months until a match was set up in Newport on July 30, where Schrader and his new partner Thunder defeated York and Matthews to become the undisputed champions. Schrader and Thunder held the belts until the end of the year following a loss to The Backseat Boyz (Johnny Kashmere and Trent Acid) on November 19, 1999. He made another appearance the following year to help his former tag team partner who was being attacked by Brute Force (Viper, Carnage, Stud, and Ground Zero) after taking them on in a handicap match.

=== Future Wrestling Alliance (1999–2000) ===
Shrader also had a stint in the short-lived Future Wrestling Alliance wrestling Tommy Idol, Gregory Martin, and Qenaan Creed over the summer At least one of his bouts with Creed was later aired on the promotion's TV show. At the FWA's "Ultimate Jeopardy" supercard, he and Gregory Martin (as the "Fin Twins" with manager Gabriella Leigh) participated in four-way tag-team elimination match with The Sex Idols (Tommy Idol & Qeenan Creed), The Family of Freaks (Adam Flash & Danny Rose), and The Intimidators (Mark Mest & Maxx Crimson) to crown the first-ever FWA tag team champions. He and Gregory eliminated The Intimidators, and were one of the last two team's in the match, but were defeated by The Sex Idols when Idol pinned Martin. The Fin Twins defeated The Sex Idols the following year, on March 11, 2000, with their manager Gabriella Leigh, substituting for an injured Mark Shrader, pinned Tommy Idol following a top-rope "Gabycanrana". Shrader teamed with Reckless Youth three months later in a 3-way dance with The Sex Idols and Family of Freaks. One of his last matches for the promotion was a singles match against The Sex Idols' Qeenan Creed (with Tommy Idol and Pandora) in Palo Alto on September 9, 2000, which he lost. In Shrader's corner were "Ramblin'" Rick Myers and Gabriella Leigh and, prior to the match, Shrader announced to the fans that Myers had agreed to be his fellow "Fin Twin" while his regular partner Gregory Martin was recovering from his injuries.

=== Maryland Championship Wrestling (2000–2003) ===
Though he was prohibited from wrestling in MCW, he continued to work as co-head trainer of "Bone Breakers" and occasionally made appearances as co-owner. The birth of his daughter in 2000 also limited his involvement. A match between Corporal Punishment and the Brusier at Micheal’s Eighth Avenue on October 28, 2000, saw Shrader attempt to intervene when Cpl. Punishment pulled a knife on his opponent and threatened security in a "worked shoot".

In Atlantic Terror Championship Wrestling, the Fin Twins (Mark Shrader & Gregory Martin) faced Dino Divine & Chad Austin on December 8, 2000, in Martinsburg, West Virginia. They defeated Divine and Jimmy Cicero for the promotion's tag team titles on January 19, 2001, and remained champions until ATCW's close later that year.

MCW held its final show, "The Last Dance: Shane Shamrock Memorial Cup", on July 16, 2003 at Michael's Eighth Avenue ballroom, with over 1,000 fans in attendance. At the event, it was announced that MCW would be "merging" the MEWF. Dan Devitt (and Jeff Jones) joined the MEWF as bookers and their "Bone Breakers" school was bought out by the MEWF's "Brain Busters Academy". Shrader did not join his partner in the MEWF instead leaving the industry to become a full-time bartender at Baltimore's Hard Rock Cafe.

=== Recent years (2006–) ===
Since his retirement, Shrader has made occasional appearances at wrestling events. On April 8, 2006, at the 10th Annual Super 8 Tournament, Shrader was among the former participants honored at the event including Ace Darling, Simon Diamond, Christopher Daniels, Low Ki, Donovan Morgan, Petey Williams, Cheetah Master, Devon Storm, Jayson Reign, R. J. Brewer, Mike Kruel, Xavier, Andrew Ryker, and Eric Matlock. He also made an appearance for MCW's "Tribute to the Legends" in Dundalk, Maryland on September 10, 2006, where he and Headbanger Mosh were honored by the promotion.

== Championships and accomplishments ==
- Atlantic Terror Championship Wrestling
  - ATCW Tag Team Championship (1 time, last) – with Gregory Martin
- East Coast Wrestling Association
  - ECWA Tag Team Championship (2 time) – with Christian York and Thunder
- Future Wrestling Alliance
  - FWA Tag Team Championship (1 time) – with Gregory Martin
- Independent Pro Wrestling Alliance
  - IPWA Light Heavyweight Championship (2 times, first)
- Maryland Championship Wrestling
  - Match of the Year (1998) – vs. Christian York, Joey Matthews, Quinn Nash, Earl the Pearl, and Shane Shamrock, Patapsco Arena, July 19
- Mid-Eastern Wrestling Federation
  - MEWF Heavyweight Championship (1 time)
  - MEWF Light Heavyweight Championship (2 times)
  - MEWF Tag Team Championship (2 times) – with Devon Storm and Corporal Punishment
- Pro Wrestling Illustrated
  - PWI ranked him #253 of the top 500 singles wrestlers in the PWI 500 in 1996
