= Jimmy Jannetty =

American professional wrestler (born 1972)

Personal information
- Born: June 12, 1972 (age 54) Philadelphia, Pennsylvania, United States

Professional wrestling career
- Ring name(s): Jimmy Jannetty; Randy Solomon
- Billed height: 5 ft 10 in (178 cm)
- Billed weight: 223 lb (101 kg)
- Debut: 1989
- Retired: 2019

Jimmy Jannetty (born June 12, 1972) is an American retired professional wrestler who is best known for his appearances in Eastern Championship Wrestling, Mid-Eastern Wrestling Federation and Maryland Championship Wrestling.

== Professional wrestling career ==
Jannetty started wrestling for the Tri-State Wrestling Alliance in 1990. He made his debut for Eastern Championship Wrestling in 1992. He would team with Larry Winters. On April 23, 1992, Jannetty competed in a battle royal for the first round for the ECW World Heavyweight Championship won by Jimmy Snuka who became the very first champion. Then, Jannetty teamed with JT Smith in the inaugural ECW Tag Team Titles losing to The Super Destroyers on June 23.

After ECW, he worked for Smoky Mountain Wrestling in 1993. From 1992 to 1998, Jannetty worked for Mid-Eastern Wrestling Federation where he teamed with Rich Myers (wrestler) as the Headliners winning the MEWF Tag Team Championship four times. He continued working in the independents in Pennsylvania, North Carolina, West Virginia, Virginia and Florida.

On May 16, 1999, he defeated Steve Richards for the LAW Heavyweight Championship in Chichester, Pennsylvania. He held the title for two and a half years. On October 13, 2001, he dropped the title to Al Perez in Philadelphia.

From 2007 to 2008 and 2010, he worked for Maryland Championship Wrestling, reuniting with Rich Myers. Also worked in West Virginia's Primal Conflict Wrestling from 2007 to 2014. He retired from wrestling in 2019.

== Championships and accomplishments ==
- Mid-Eastern Wrestling Federation
  - MEWF Light Heavyweight Championship (1 time)
  - MEWF Tag Team Championship (4 times) – with Rich Myers (4)
- Primal Conflict Wrestling
  - PCW Heavyweight Championship (2 times)
- Liberty All-Star Wrestling
  - LAW Heavyweight Championship (1 time)
  - LAW Tag Team Championship (1 time) - with Rockin Rebel
