= Dino Casanova =

American professional wrestler

Personal information
- Born: David Mark DiMeglio; February 8, 1967 Baltimore, Maryland, United States
- Died: March 1, 2002 (aged 35)

Professional wrestling career
- Ring name(s): Dave Casanova; Dino Casanova; Dino DiMeglio
- Billed height: 6 ft 2 in (1.88 m)
- Billed weight: 227 lb (103 kg)
- Debut: 1987

David Mark DiMeglio (February 8, 1967 – March 1, 2002) was an American professional wrestler, better known by the ring name Dino Casanova. He competed in independent promotions in the Northeastern United States including Eastern Championship Wrestling and the Mid-Eastern Wrestling Federation, most notably as one half of the Cream Team with Rip Sawyer. DiMeglio also had a brief stint in World Championship Wrestling with Romeo Valentino during the mid-1990s. As The Goodfellas, they would continue teaming with each other on the independent circuit until his death.

== Professional wrestling career ==
=== Early career (1987–1992) ===
DiMeglio began wrestling in the Mid-Atlantic region in 1987 and eventually began teaming with Rip Sawyer as Cream Team on the Virginia independent circuit. In May 1988, they defeated International World Class Championship Wrestling's Billion Dollar Babies (G.Q. Stratus and Mike Sampson) in a tournament final to become the first tag team champions for Max Thrasher's Atlantic Wrestling Federation.

On December 17, 1988, they wrestled The Rock 'n' Roll Express (Ricky Morton and Robert Gibson) for the Virginia Wrestling Association tag team titles losing via countout. A year later, The Cream Team fought The Brothers Superior (Doug Superior & Neil Superior) to decide the first NWL Tag Team Champions. After more than three years as champions, the Cream Team lost the AWF Tag Team titles to the Hellhounds in York, Pennsylvania at the end of the year.

DiMeglio and Sawyer, among others such as Barry Hardy, Duane Gill and Axl Rotten, helped train Ian Rotten during his early career.

Appearing at the Mid-Eastern Wrestling Federation's first event, he and Sawyer lost to the Lords of Pain (Pain & Agony) in a match to crown the first MEWF Tag Team Champions on August 2, 1991. Defeating Pain and Bubba Monroe (substituting for an injured Agony) for the title on December 1, the two would continue defending the title for much of 1992, as well becoming the Atlantic Coast Wrestling Federation's first tag team champions in April 1992, until they began wrestling for the Philadelphia-based Eastern Championship Wrestling. Following their departure, the title were vacated on October 23.

=== Eastern Championship Wrestling (1992–1994) ===
He and Sawyer made their debut in Eastern Championship Wrestling in late 1992, teaming with Glen Osbourne in a six-man tag team match to defeat Max Thrasher and The Super Destroyers at the Taber Youth Association in Philadelphia on October 3. The two later made an unsuccessful bid for the ECW Tag Team Championship weeks later losing to The Super Destroyers at The Chestnut Cabaret in Philadelphia on October 24.

At the beginning of the year, DiMeglio and Sawyer had regained the AWF Tag Team titles from the Hellhounds. The two men remained champions until their breakup in May 1993. DiMeglio and Nick Tarentino, as "The Goodfellows", defeated Rip Sawyer and A.J. Fritzoid for the belts in York that same month and held the belts until the promotion's close that same year.

Returning to Maryland, he began teaming with Romeo Valentino as The Goodfellas (or The Goodfellows). They eventually challenged the Lords of Pain for the WWA Tag Team Championship in Essex, Maryland on April 9, 1994. He and Valentino would continue teaming together in the Mid-Atlantic region for the next several years including NWA New Jersey, Pennsylvania Championship Wrestling and the World Wrestling Alliance.

=== World Championship Wrestling (1995–1996) ===
On February 2, 1995, he and Valentino made their WCW debut on WCW Worldwide against The Fantastics (Bobby Fulton & Tommy Rogers) at Walt Disney World in Orlando, Florida. Several weeks later, they appeared on WCW Saturday Night in the main event against Stars & Stripes (Marcus Bagwell & The Patriot). This was included as a dark match at SuperBrawl V at the Baltimore Arena in Baltimore, Maryland on February 19, 1995. After confronting Eric Bischoff, WCW World Heavyweight Champion Big Van Vader interfered in the match attacking all four men. Bobby Heenan frequently referred to Casanova and Valentino as "The Flying Linguinis" during their matches (they did not use their official team name in WCW).

Occasionally appearing in World Championship Wrestling during the next two years, DiMeglio was seen on WCW Saturday Night facing "Flyin'" Brian Pillman on April 29 and Sting in a match for the WCW United States Heavyweight Championship at the Center Stage Theatre in Atlanta on July 11, 1995. Later that year, he and Frankie Lancaster lost to Pillman & Chris Benoit on WCW Saturday Night on December 9 and, several weeks later, he faced Hugh Morris at WCW Main Event on January 7, 1996. Casanova also won the MEWF Light Heavyweight/Maryland Championship from Mark Schrader on March 17, 1996, but was stripped of the title a month later.

=== Return to Maryland and later career (1996–2002) ===
In October 1999, he and Max Thrasher defeated The Bad Crew to win the MEWF Tag Team title before losing the title to Ricky Blues & The New Patriot on November 13. The following year, he and Thrasher entered a championship tournament for the vacant MEWF Tag Team title, advancing to the finals before they lost to Jim Christian and Rayne on January 7, 2000.

Teaming with Romeo Valentino, DiMeglio lost to Morgus the Maniac & The Clown at the Harry Grove Stadium in Frederick, Maryland on July 17, 2000, with midget wrestler Dink as special guest referee. The following night at the Summer Sizzler supercard, he and Valentino lost to MEWF Tag Team Champions The Tokyo Terrors after Thrasher attempted to interfere.

During the summer, he made several appearances in NWA New Jersey facing Gillberg in Wildwood, New Jersey on July 19 and August 3 before losing to Max Thrasher in a four-way match with Morgus the Maniac and Buzz Stryker in Dundalk, Maryland on September 22, 2000. He later defeated Max Thrasher for the MEWF Heavyweight Championship in late 2000, although he held the title for only a short period before losing it back to Thrasher before the end of the year. The title was later vacated on March 17 and, although he lost to Rayne in a match for the vacant title in Baltimore on April 17, he finally defeated Rayne to regain the MEWF Heavyweight Championship on August 2, 2001. Holding the title for over three months, DiMeglio eventually lost the title to Cat Burglar in Dundalk, Maryland on November 25.

He defeated Max Thrasher for the MEWF Mid-Atlantic Heavyweight Championship on January 27, 2001, losing the title to Morgus the Maniac on March 17.

== Death ==
DiMeglio died from a heart attack on March 1, 2002. He was survived by his wife, Leslie, and son, Dylan Mark.

== Championships and accomplishments ==
- Atlantic Coast Wrestling Federation
  - ACWF Tag Team Championship (1 time) – with Rip Sawyer
- Atlantic States Wrestling Alliance
  - ASWA Tag Team Championship (1 time) – with Rip Sawyer
- Atlantic Wrestling Federation
  - AWF Tag Team Championship (3 times) – with Rip Sawyer (2) and Nick Tarentino
- Maryland Championship Wrestling
  - MCW Hall of Fame (Class of 2009)
- Mid-Eastern Wrestling Federation
  - MEWF Heavyweight Championship (2 times)
  - MEWF Light Heavyweight Championship (1 time)
  - MEWF Mid-Atlantic Championship (2 times)
  - MEWF Tag Team Championship (3 times) – with Rip Sawyer, Max Thrasher and Chad Bowman
- Universal Independent Wrestling
  - UIW Tag Team Championship (1 time) – with Rip Sawyer
- Virginia Wrestling Association
  - VWA Tag Team Championship (6 times) – with Rip Sawyer
- Wrestling Independent Network
  - WIN Tag Team Championship (1 time) – with Rip Sawyer

== See also ==
- List of premature professional wrestling deaths
