= A. C. Golden =

American professional wrestler (1970-2014)

Personal information
- Born: Mark Kevin Frear; February 1, 1970 Salisbury, Maryland, United States
- Died: May 11, 2014 (aged 44) Baltimore, Maryland, United States

Professional wrestling career
- Ring name(s): A. C. Golden; Golden Phoenix; Homeboy; Mark Frear
- Billed height: 6 ft 0 in (183 cm)
- Billed weight: 220 lb (100 kg)
- Debut: c. 1988
- Retired: c. 1998

Mark Kevin Frear (February 1, 1970 - May 11, 2014) was an American professional wrestler, better known by his ring name A. C. Golden, who competed in Mid-Atlantic and Southern independent promotions during the late 1980s and 1990s. He was a longtime mainstay of the United States Wrestling Association in Memphis, Tennessee, where he and New Jack won the USWA Tag Team Championship in 1993, as well as in the Mid-Eastern Wrestling Federation where he was a top contender for the MEWF Heavyweight Championship up until his retirement in 1998. He also made occasional appearances in the World Wrestling Federation early in his career.

== Professional wrestling career ==
Mark Frear made his professional debut around 1988 and spent the first year of his career wrestling in the Mid-Atlantic and Southern independent circuit as The Golden Phoenix. One of his first major opponents during his rookie year was against Dirty Dennis Allen whom he faced in Woodbury, New Jersey, for WWA Wrestling. That same year, he appeared as a preliminary wrestler in the World Wrestling Federation. In his first WWF match, he teamed with George Skaaland, son of the legendary Arnold Skaaland, against The Powers of Pain (The Warlord & The Barbarian) at the Civic Center in Springfield, Massachusetts, on August 29, 1989. The match was later aired on WWF Wrestling Challenge. A day later on WWF Superstars, Frear was pinned by Akeem at the Cumberland County Civic Center in Portland, Maine, after a big splash. At the end of the match, Frear was handcuffed to the ring ropes by Akeem's tag team partner Big Boss Man and beaten with his nightstick. A year later, he and Joe Sturnam lost to Rhythm & Blues (The Honky Tonk Man & Greg Valentine) in Syracuse, New York, on April 3, 1990.

By 1991, Frear was back on the indy circuit and found success in several promotions, most notably, Gordon Scozzari's American Wrestling Federation, the Wrestling Independent Network and the Mid-Eastern Wrestling Federation. On July 11, 1992, he entered a championship tournament in Pasadena, Maryland, for the vacant MEWF Heavyweight Championship and lost to Max Thrasher in the finals. Later that year, he wrestled "Hot Stuff" Eddie Gilbert in a special "challenge match" at an MEWF show in Hampstead, Maryland, on November 21, 1992. The event was to raise money for the North Carroll High School, the show taking place in the school's gymnasium, with the proceeds going to purchase computer software for its business department.

In early 1993, Frear began wrestling for the United States Wrestling Association in Memphis, Tennessee. Under the name Homeboy, he and New Jack began teaming together and quickly became contenders to the USWA Tag Team Championship. On June 21, 1993, they defeated The Southern Rockers (Rex King & Steve Doll) for the belts at the Mid-South Coliseum in front of 2,000 fans. They continued feuding with The Southern Rockers and defeated them in a rematch the following week. On July 5, he and New Jack lost to King and Doll in separate singles matches, and lost the tag team titles to C.W. Bergstrom & Melvin Penrod later that night.

After this, he returned to the MEWF where he spent the last years of his career. In one of his last matches, he lost to Glenn Osbourne in the finals of a championship tournament for the MEWF Heavyweight Championship in Baltimore on February 1, 1998.

== Championships and accomplishments ==
- National Championship Wrestling
  - NCW United States Heavyweight Championship (1 time)
- World Wrestling Association (New Jersey)
  - WWA Heavyweight Championship (1 time)
- United States Wrestling Association
  - USWA Tag Team Championship (1 time) – with New Jack
- Universal Independent Wrestling
  - UIW Tag Team Championship (1 time, first)
- Wrestling Independent Network
  - WIN Heavyweight Championship (1 time, first)
- Pro Wrestling Illustrated
  - PWI ranked him # 390 of the 500 best singles wrestlers of the PWI 500 in 1992
