= MEWF Heavyweight Championship =

Professional wrestling championship

MEWF Unified Heavyweight Championship

Details
- Promotion: Mid-Eastern Wrestling Federation
- Date established: January 18, 1992
- Date retired: 2004

Other name(s)
- MEWF Heavyweight Championship
Statistics
- First champion(s): Ricky Blues
- Final champion(s): The Bruiser (won March 28, 2004)
- Most reigns: Lucifer (3); Morgus the Maniac (3); Max Thrasher (3); Corporal Punishment (3)
- Longest reign: Lucifer (241 days)
- Shortest reign: Corporal Punishment (1 day)

The Mid-Eastern Wrestling Federation (MEWF) Heavyweight Championship is the highest ranking singles title in the Mid-Eastern Wrestling Federation, one of three in the promotion.

The title was created when Ricky Blues defeated Agent Orange at an event held in Odenton, Maryland on January 18, 1992. In 2003, the title was merged with the MCW Heavyweight Championship when Maryland Championship Wrestling held its final show as an interpromtional event with the Mid-Eastern Wrestling Federation creating the Mid-Eastern Wrestling Federation Unified Heavyweight Championship on July 16, 2003.

The championship has been known as:

- MEWF Heavyweight Championship (1991–2003)
- MEWF Unified Heavyweight Championship (2003–2004)

The heavyweight title was later revived after Maryland Championship Wrestling began promoting events in the Maryland-area in 2007.

There have been a total of 30 recognized champions who have had a combined 45 official reigns.

== Title history ==
Wrestler:	Times:	Date:	Location:	Notes:
Ricky Blues	1	January 18, 1992	Odenton, MD	Defeated Agent Orange in a tournament final.
Vacated		1992		
Max Thrasher	1	July 11, 1992	Pasadena, MD	Defeated A.C. Golden in 8-man tournament final.
Lucifer	1	February 5, 1993	Gaithersburg, Maryland	
Morgus the Maniac	1	November 13, 1993	Hampstead, MD	
Lucifer	2	November 14, 1993	Essex, MD	Title history is unrecorded between November 1994-March 1995.
Morgus the Maniac	2	November 1994	Gaithersburg, Maryland	
Mad Dog O'Malley	1	February 5, 1993	Gaithersburg, Maryland	
Corporal Punishment	1	March 26, 1995	Gaithersburg, Maryland	
Jim "The Anvil" Neidhart	1	October 1, 1995	Gaithersburg, Maryland	
Corporal Punishment	2	October 1995	Gaithersburg, Maryland	Defeated A.C. Golden in 8-man tournament final.
Joe Thunder	1	December 3, 1995	Gaithersburg, Maryland	
Johnny Gunn	1	March 26, 1996	Gaithersburg, Maryland	
Corporal Punishment	3	June 30, 1996	Gaithersburg, Maryland	
Axl Rotten	1	June 30, 1996	Gaithersburg, Maryland	
Mark "The Shark" Shrader	1	September 13, 1996	Gaithersburg, Maryland	
Axl Rotten	2	November 23, 1996	Gaithersburg, Maryland	
Stevie Richards	1	February 2, 1997	Gaithersburg, Maryland	
Disco Inferno	1	April 3, 1997	Gaithersburg, Maryland	
Vacated		August 9, 1997		
Pit Bull #2	1	August 10, 1997	Gaithersburg, Maryland	Defeated Knuckles Zanwich to win the vacant title.
Vacated		November 7, 1997		
Salvatore Sincere	2	November 8, 1997	Gaithersburg, Maryland	Defeated Corporal Punishment to win the vacant title.
Vacated		December 22, 1997		
Glenn Osbourne	1	February 1, 1998	Baltimore, MD	Defeated A.C. Golden a tournament final.
Danny Rose	1	April 4, 1998	Essex, MD	
Morgus the Maniac	3	November 14, 1998	Hampstead, MD	
Bob Starr	1	-	Gaithersburg, Maryland	
Honky Tonk Man	1	October 2, 1999	Dundalk, MD	
Bob Starr	2	November 13, 1999	Hampstead, MD	
Patch	1	March 31, 2000	Dundalk, MD	
Vacated		April 29, 2000		Vacated after Patch was stripped of the title for failing to make scheduled title defences.
Lucifer	3	April 29, 2000	Middle River, MD	Defeated Max Thrasher for the vacant title in a match with special referee "Hacksaw" Jim Duggan.
DOA	1	August 9, 2000	Martinsburg, WV	Following the death of longtime MEWF mainstay DOA on June 24, a tribute show "DOA: A Night to Remember" was held in his honor. Lucifer voluntarily vacated the title for DOA being awarded the title for one night only.
Buzz Stryker	1	August 12, 2000	Middle River, MD	
Max Thrasher	2	September 22, 2000	Dundalk, MD	Defeated Morgus the Maniac, Buzz Stryker and Dino Casanova in a four-Way match.
Dino Casanova	3	2000		
Max Thrasher	3	November 11, 2000	Hampstead, MD	Following the death of longtime MEWF mainstay DOA on June 24, a tribute show "DOA: A Night to Remember" was held in his honor being awarded the title for one night only.
Ruckus		March 17, 2001	Essex, MD	
Rayne	1	April 12, 2001	Baltimore, MD	Defeated Dino Casanova for the vacant title.
Dino Casanova	2	August 2, 2001	Dundalk, MD	
Vacated		2001		
Cat Burglar	1	November 25, 2001	Dundalk, MD	Held in the Teamsters Union Hall, Cat Burglar won a 17-man battle royal to become the new MEWF Heavyweight Champion.
Held Up		February 9, 2002	Baltimore, MD	The title is held up following a three-way match between Cat Burglar, Nick Berk and Ruckus in which all three men scored a simultaneous pinfall during the match.
Cat Burglar	2	March 3, 2002	Baltimore, MD	Defeated Nick Berk and Ryker in a three-Way ladder match.
Drew Pain	1	October 26, 2002		
Buzz Stryker	2	October 27, 2002		Defeated Drew Pain and Salvatore Sincere in a three-Way match.
Chad Bowman	1	March 9, 2003	Dundalk, MD	
Romeo Valentino	2	May 3, 2003		
Danny Doring	1	July 16, 2003	Glen Burnie, MD	Defeated Romeo Valentino and Chris Chetti in a three-Way match to unify the MEWF and MCW Heavyweight Championship.
Danny Doring	2	March 28, 2004		
Vacated		March 28, 2004	Dundalk, MD	Vacated after Danny Doring is stripped of the title for failing to make scheduled title defences.
The Bruiser	1	March 28, 2004	Dundalk, MD	Defeated Romeo Valentino in match for the vacant title.
