= MEWF Tag Team Championship =

Professional wrestling tag team championship

MEWF Unified Tag Team Championship
- The Hollywood Hunks (Lucifer and "Hollywood" Bob Starr) as MEWF Tag Team Champions.

Details
- Promotion: Mid-Eastern Wrestling Federation
- Date established: August 2, 1991
- Date retired: 2004

Other name
- MEWF Tag Team Championship
Statistics
- First champions: Lords of Darkness (Pain and Agony)
- Final champions: Alex Lunar and Eagle (won March 28, 2004)
- Most reigns: Darkside (3); The Headbangers (3); Steve Corino and Jimmy Cicero (3); The Bad Crew (3)
- Longest reign: Cream Team (315 days)
- Shortest reign: KPA (<1 day); Suicide and Bruiser (<1 day)

This is a chronological list of MEWF tag team champions. The MEWF Tag Team Championship is the oldest championship title in the Mid-Eastern Wrestling Federation having been established when the Lords of Darkness (Pain and Agony) defeated Cream Team (Dino Casanova and Rip Sawyer) at the MEWF's first show in Pasadena, Maryland on August 2, 1991. The titles were later unified with the MCW Tag Team Championship during Maryland Championship Wrestling's last show on July 16, 2003.

The championship has been known as:

- MEWF Tag Team Championship (1991 – 2003)
- MEWF Unified Tag Team Championship (2003 – 2004)

The tag team title was later revived after Maryland Championship Wrestling began promoting events in the Maryland-area in 2007.

== Title history ==
Wrestlers (individual reigns):	Reigns together:	Date:	Location:	Notes:
Lords of Darkness (Pain and Agony)	1	August 2, 1991	Pasadena, MD	Defeated Cream Team (Dino Casanova and Rip Sawyer)
Cream Team (Dino Casanova and Rip Sawyer)	1	December 1, 1991	Dunbolt, MD	Defeated Agony and Bubba Monroe who substituted for Pain after being injured.
Vacant	1	October 11, 1992	Philadelphia, PA	The titles are vacated after Cream Team leave the promotion in October 1992.
Leather and Lace (Rich Carlisle and Adrian Hall)	1	October 23, 1992	Essex, MD	Defeated Sonic Express (Ricky Blues and Nick Tarantino)
Sonic Express (Ricky Blues and Nick Tarantino)	1	November 14, 1992	Gaithersburg, MD	Defeated Carlisle and Riki Lane substituting for an injured Adrian Hall.
The Outrageous Ones (Riki Lane and Quinn Nash)	1	March 6, 1993	Dundalk, MD	
The Goodfellows (Gary Young and Steve Dane)	2	August 14, 1993	Baltimore, MD	
Hollywood Hunks (Lucifer and Bob Starr)	1	November 1994	Unknown	
Road Warrior Hawk and Ultimate Comet	1	November 11, 1994	Catonsville, MD	Title history unrecorded between November 11, 1995 until March 28, 1995.
Mason Dixon (J.R. Willet and Bulldozer Benton)	1	Unknown	Unknown	
Sweet and Sour (Rob Knoxious (2) and Johnny Graham)	1	March 28, 1995	Unknown	
Models Inc. (Michael Sweet and Johnny Handsome)	1	April 23, 1995	Unknown	
Joe Thunder and Mad Dog O'Mally	1	July 8, 1995	Unknown	
Quinn Nash (2) and Adam Flash	1	July 9, 1995	Unknown	
The Bad Crew (Bad Crew #1 and Bad Crew #2)	1	October 5, 1995	Unknown	
Lucifer (2) and Cat Burglar	3	December 3, 1995	Unknown	
Darkside (Glen Osbourne and Rockin' Rebel)	1	February 25, 1996	Unknown	Defeated Lucifer in a handicap match.
The Headbangers (Mosh and Thrasher)	1	June 30, 1996	Unknown	
Darkside	2	July 27, 1996	Unknown	
Axl Rotten and Corporal Punishment	1	August 16, 1996	Unknown	
Menace 2 Society (Adam Flash, Romeo Valentino and Quinn Nash)	1	September 13, 1996	New York, NY	
The Headbangers	2	September 14, 1996	Philadelphia, PA	
Darkside	3	November 10, 1996	New York, NY	
The Headbangers	3	November 16, 1996	Allentown, PA	
Vacated		February 2, 1997	New York, NY	
Mark "The Shark" Shrader and Devon Storm	1	March 2, 1997	Philadelphia, PA	Defeated Thomas Rodman and Rebel in a tournament final.
Steve Corino and Jimmy Cicero	1	June 29, 1997	Allentown, PA	
Mark Schrader (2) and Corporal Punishment (2)	1	July 17, 1997	Allentown, PA	
Steve Corino and Jimmy Cicero	2	August 10, 1997	Baltimore, MD	
The Misfits (Harley Lewis and Derek Domino)	2	September 17, 1997		
Steve Corino and Jimmy Cicero	3	October 18, 1997	Baltimore, MD	
Joey Matthews and Christian York	2	October 23, 1997	Baltimore, MD	Defeated Steve Corino and Jimmy Cicero and Corporal Punishment and Mark Schrader in a 3-way match.
Jimmy Cicero and Julio Sanchez	1	November 13, 1997		
Vacated		December 22, 1997		Title is vacated.
Bad Crew	2	February 1, 1998	Baltimore, MD	Defeated Marvelous Inc. (Jimmy Jannetty and Rich Myers) in a tournament final.
Marvelous Inc. (Jimmy Jannetty and "Ramblin'" Rich Myers)	1	April 17, 1998		
Bob Starr and Joe Thunder	1	September 18, 1998	Baltimore, MD	
Bad Crew	3	October 10, 1998	Baltimore, MD	
Max Thrasher and Dino Casanova	1	October 1999		
Ricky Blues and The New Patriot	1	November 13, 1999	Hampstead, MD	
The Good, The Bad And The Ugly	1	January 7, 2000	Dundalk, MD	Defeated Black and Blue for the titles.
Joe Thunder and Mad Dog O'Mailey	1	January 7, 2000	Dundalk, MD	Joe Thunder and Mad Dog O'Mailey were awarded the titles after The Good, The Bad And The Ugly split up.
Rayne and Jim Christian	1	January 7, 2000	Dundalk, MD	Defeated Max Thrasher and Dino Casanova in a tournament final.
Flexx Wheeler (2) and O-Dogg (9)	1	2000		
The Tokyo Terrors (Keushiro and Watsumi)	1	April 29, 2000	Middle River, MD	
Bob Starr (3) and Lucifer (2)	1	September 22, 2000	Dundalk, MD	
Rayne and Buzz Stryker	1	October 16, 2001	Peoria, IL	
The Tokyo Terrors	2	November 25, 2001	Dundalk, MD	This match was held at the Teamsters Union Hall.
Eagle and Stevie Riggs	1	February 9, 2002	Baltimore, MD	
Derek Wayne (4) and Derek Frazier	1	April 7, 2002	Dundalk, MD	
The KPA (Joe Thunder and Steve Camry)	1	June 9, 2002		
Lucifer and Max Thrasher	1	June 9, 2002		
Chad Bowman (1) and Dino Casanova (9)	1	November 24, 2002		Defeated Max Thrasher and Bob Starr, who substituted for Lucifer.
The Holy Rollers (Earl the Pearl and Rich Meyers)	1	January 12, 2003		
"Sure Shot" Derek Wayne and "Mad Dog" Buzz Stryker	1	March 12, 2003	Glen Burnie, MD	
G-Dawg and The Buck Child	1	June 8, 2003	Northpoint, MD	
Buzz Strker and Derek Wayne (4)	1	July 13, 2003	Dundalk, MD	
Dope and Sideswype	1	July 16, 2003	Glen Burnie, MD	Defeated Chad Bowman and Dino Devine and Buzz Stryker and Derek Wayne in a 3-way tag team match. This match would also unify the MEWF and MCW Tag Team Titles.
Suicide and Bruiser	2	January 11, 2004	Dundalk, MD	
The Slackers (Chad Bowman and Dino Devine)	1	January 11, 2004	Dundalk, MD	
Alex Lunar and Eagle	1	March 28, 2004	Dundalk, MD	
