= MEWF Cruiserweight Championship =

Professional wrestling championship

MEWF Unified Cruiserweight Championship

Details
- Promotion: Mid-Eastern Wrestling Federation
- Date established: October 11, 1991
- Date retired: 2004

Other names
- MEWF Light Heavyweight Championship; MEWF Maryland State Championship; MEWF Cruiserweight Championship
Statistics
- First champion: Ricky Blues
- Final champions: Andrew Ryker (won January 11, 2004)
- Most reigns: Steve Corino (3)
- Longest reign: Adam Flash (258 days)
- Shortest reign: Crash Holly (<1 day); Eddie Chambers (<1 day)

The Mid-Eastern Wrestling Federation (MEWF) Cruiserweight Championship was the primary Cruiserweight singles title in the Mid-Eastern Wrestling Federation.

The title was created when Ricky Blues defeated Adrian Hall at an event held in Pasadena, Maryland on October 11, 1991. It was originally known as the MEWF Light Heavyweight Championship, then renamed the MEWF Maryland State Championship in 2001. In 2003, the title was merged with the MCW Cruiserweight Championship when Maryland Championship Wrestling held its final show as an interpromtional event with the Mid-Eastern Wrestling Federation creating the Mid-Eastern Wrestling Federation Unified Cruiserweight Championship on July 16, 2003.

The championship has been known as:

- MEWF Light Heavyweight Championship (1991 – 2000)
- MEWF Maryland State Championship (2000 – 2002)
- MEWF Cruiserweight Championship (2002 – 2003)
- MEWF Unified Cruiserweight Championship (2003 – 2004)

There have been a total of 27 recognized champions who have had a combined 35 official reigns.

== Title history ==
=== MEWF Light Heavyweight Championship ===
Wrestler:	Times:	Date:	Location:	Notes:
Ricky Blues	1	October 11, 1991	Pasadena, MD	Defeated Adrian Hall to become the first champion.
Vacated		1992		Title declared vacant when Ricky Blues is stripped of the championship.
Nick Tarentino	1	February 22, 1992	Pasadena, MD	Defeated Rich Carlisle to win the vacant title.
Adrian Hall	1	July 11, 1992	Pasadena, MD	
Jimmy Jannetty	1	October 23, 1992	Essex, MD	
The Lightning Kid	1	March 6, 1993	Dundalk, MD	
Nick Tarentino	2	March 7, 1993	Hampden, MD	
Rich Myers	1	November 13, 1993	Hampstead, MD	
Title history unrecorded		1993-1994		
Vacated		November 1994		
Mark Schrader	1	November 11, 1994	Cantonsville, MD	Defeated Shane Shamrock to win the vacant title.
The Cat Burglar	1	March 26, 1995		
Mark Schrader	2	1995		
Dino Casanova	1	March 17, 1996		
Vacated		April 14, 1996		Title declared vacant when Dino Casanova is stripped of the championship.
Earl the Pearl	1	April 15, 1996		Defeated Mark Schrader to win the vacant title.
Steve Corino	1	June 30, 1996		
Adam Flash	1	December 1, 1996		
Vacated		February 2, 1997		Title declared vacant by the MEWF Commissioner.
Adam Flash	2	March 2, 1997		Won title in three-way Ladder match with Steve Corino and Quinn Nash.
Quinn Nash	1	November 15, 1997		Won title in three-way Ladder match with Adam Flash and Mark Schrader.
Vacated		1998		
Steve Corino	2	March 6, 1998	Baltimore, MD	Defeated Flexx Wheeler to win vacant title.
The Cat Burglar	2	September 18, 1998	Baltimore, MD	Defeated Steve Corino and Chad Austin in Three Way Dance.
Steve Corino	3	November 13, 1998	Essex, MD	
Title history unrecorded		1998-2000		
Hurricane Kid	1	2000		
Ruckus	1	November 11, 2000	Hampstead, MD	Won title in a Ladder match.
Title is renamed the MEWF Maryland Championship.		2000		

=== MEWF Maryland State Championship ===
Wrestler:	Times:	Date:	Location:	Notes:
Steve Camery	1	January 27, 2001		
Buzz Stryker	1	April 12, 2001	Baltimore, MD	
Agent Orange	1	August 2, 2001		
The Patriot	1	November 25, 2001	Dundalk, MD	Event held at the Teamsters Union Hall.
Title is abandoned.		January 1, 2002		

=== MEWF Cruiserweight Championship ===
Wrestler:	Times:	Date:	Location:	Notes:
Derek Frazier	1	September 22, 2002	Baltimore, MD	Won title in a 6-man elimination match defeating Derek Wayne to become the first champion.
Alex Lunar	1	January 12, 2003	North Point, MD	Event held at the North Point Flea Market.
Adam Flash	1	June 8, 2003	North Point, MD	Event held at the North Point Flea Market.
Crash Holly	1	July 16, 2003	Glen Burnie, MD	
Christian York	1	July 16, 2003	Glen Burnie, MD	Won the title in Shane Shamrock Memorial Cup match with 5 other participants. The MEWF and MCW Cruiserweight Championships are unified.
Vacated		September 7, 2003	North Point, MD	Christian York is stripped of the championship when he fails to appear for a scheduled title defense.
Andrew Ryker	1	September 7, 2003	North Point, MD	Defeated Alex Lunar, Qenaan Creed and Adrian Chambers to win the vacant title.
Eddie Chambers	1	November 9, 2003	Dundalk, MD	
Reckless Youth	1	November 9, 2003	Dundalk, MD	
Andrew Ryker	2	January 11, 2004	Dundalk, MD	
