= Mid-Eastern Wrestling Federation =

American independent professional wrestling promotion

- Acronym: MEWF
- Founded: August 2, 1991
- Defunct: 2004
- Style: American Wrestling
- Headquarters: Essex, Maryland, U.S. (1991-2004)
- Founder(s): Dennis Wippercht; Tim Burke
- Owner(s): Dennis Wippercht (1991-2002); Tim Burke (1991-2002); Donna M. Burke (2002-2004)
- Website: MEWF.com

The Mid-Eastern Wrestling Federation was a Mid-Atlantic independent professional wrestling promotion based in Essex, Maryland. Founded by promoter Dennis Wippercht and wrestler Tim "Lucifer" Burke in 1991, the MEWF was one of the leading independent promotions on the East Coast during the 1990s rivaling promotions such as East Coast Wrestling Association, Jersey All Pro Wrestling and Maryland Championship Wrestling.

Among its roster included Extreme Championship Wrestling regulars such as Raven, Stevie Richards, The Blue Meanie, Damien Kane, Pit Bull #2, referee "Judge" Jeff Jones, and The Bad Breed (Ian and Axl Rotten) as well as some of the leading independent wrestlers such as Cueball Carmichael, Johnny Gunn, Max Thrasher, Devon Storm, Morgus the Maniac, Boo Bradley, Jimmy Cicero, Hollywood Bob Starr, Ruckus, Dino Casanova, Corporal Punishment, The Bad Crew and Darkside (Glen Osborne and Rockin' Rebel).

Former World Wrestling Federation wrestlers such as Barry Horowitz, Road Warrior Hawk, Jim Neidhart, The Honky Tonk Man and The Headbangers as well as World Championship Wrestling veterans "Jumping" Joey Maggs and Disco Inferno also had short stints in the promotion.

== History ==
=== Early history ===
Dennis Wippercht, after promoting several wrestling events during 1990, joined Tim Burke in establishing the Mid-Eastern Wrestling Federation holding its first card in Pasadena, Maryland on August 2, 1991; during the event, the Lords of Darkness (Pain and Agony) would defeat Cream Team (Dino Casanova and Rip Sawyer) to become the first MEWF Tag Team champions. Three months later, the MEWF held a fundraiser for the North Carroll High School in Hampstead, Maryland to help purchase computer software for its business department. The card included stars such as "Hot Stuff" Eddie Gilbert, A.C. Golden, Morgus the Maniac, Axl Rotten, The Cream Team (Dino Casanova & Rip Sawyer), female wrestlers Rusty "The Fox" Thomas and MEWF Women's Champion Heidi Lee Morgan, and midget wrestler Haiti Kid. Max Thrasher wrestled The Honky Tonk Man in the main event.

During its early years, the promotion featured such wrestlers as Jim "The Anvil" Neidhart, Road Warrior Hawk and Jake "The Snake" Roberts, however, their cruiserweight division gained a considerable following with The Lightning Kid and Jimmy Jannetty feuding over the Light Heavyweight Championship during early 1993.

On July 8, 1995, the promotion held an event at the National Guard Armory in Annapolis, Maryland which featured Corporal Punishment, Axl Rotten, Mad Dog O'Malley and the debut of Pat Patterson, Jr. (the kayfabe "son" of Pat Patterson); the card was the first professional wrestling event ever held in Annapolis. Expanding outside the Baltimore-area, the promotion regularly appeared at the Secret Cove, a popular restaurant and bar in southern Fairfax County, Virginia.

During the next several years, some of the top lightheavyweight wrestlers appeared in televised matches for the promotion including Mark "the Shark" Shrader, Earl the Pearl, Steve Corino, Danny Doring, Quinn Nash, Adam Flash and Joey Mercury, with whom Christian York feuded with The Hardy Boyz, as well as participated in the ECWA's Super 8 Tournament during the late 1990s.

=== Rivalry with Maryland Championship Wrestling ===
In 1998, following a dispute with MEWF management and wrestlers over creative control and payment disagreements, Corporal Punishment and Mark Shrader left the promotion taking half of its roster with them to form Maryland Championship Wrestling. After a nearly 5-year rivalry, the two promotions began working together in October 2002 and eventually co-hosted Maryland Championship Wrestling's final event at Michael's Eighth Avenue in Glen Burnie, Maryland on July 16, 2003.

During this interpromotional card, the MCW Championship titles were merged with Mid-Eastern Championship Wrestling most notably the Christian York winning the Shane Shamrock Memorial Cup as well as the MCW/MEWF Cruiserweight Championship defeating Joey Matthews, Reckless Youth, Qenaan Creed, Jay Briscoe and Crash Holly in a six-way elimination match. The event also featured Headbanger Thrasher, Gillberg and Van Hammer.

=== Later years ===
In early 2002, Tim's wife, Donna Burke took over day-to-day running began promoting shows twice a month at Dundalk's North Point Flea Market and held a memorial show for Dino Casanova on June 20, 2002.

The following year, Burke promoted a show with Ring of Honor in Glen Burnie, Maryland on January 29 and World Wrestling Entertainment in Fair Hill, Maryland on July 31. The promotion was unable to keep the fanbase of Maryland Championship Wrestling, however, and, within several months, the promotion became inactive after its last card at Hunter's Sail Barn in Rising Sun, Maryland on October 30, 2004; this was the first wrestling event ever held in the building.

== Championships ==
- MEWF Heavyweight Championship
- MEWF Mid-Atlantic Heavyweight Championship
- MEWF Cruiserweight Championship
- MEWF Light Heavyweight Championship
- MEWF Tag Team Championship
