= Morgus the Maniac =

American professional wrestler (born 1961)

Personal information
- Born: Morgus Watson; March 1, 1961 (age 65) Baltimore, Maryland, United States

Professional wrestling career
- Ring name(s): Morgus the Maniac; Morgus Watson
- Billed height: 6 ft 3 in (191 cm)
- Billed weight: 233 lb (106 kg)
- Billed from: Bellevue State Hospital
- Trained by: Larry Sharpe, Max Thrasher and John Rambo
- Debut: 1984

Morgus Watson (born March 1, 1961), better known by his ring name Morgus the Maniac, is an American professional wrestler who has competed on the Mid-Atlantic and Southeastern independent promotions including the Eastern Wrestling Alliance, Mid-Eastern Wrestling Federation, National Wrestling League/House of Pain Wrestling Federation and Extreme Championship Wrestling and also wrestled as a preliminary wrestler for World Championship Wrestling during the early 1990s.

While competing in an interpromotional show with Extreme Championship Wrestling, then Eastern Championship Wrestling, which included former WWF wrestlers such as Mr. Hughes, Junkyard Dog, Greg "the Hammer" Valentine and Jake "the Snake" Roberts, he would lose his MEWF Heavyweight title to Lucifer the Knight of the Road on November 14, 1993.

In 2004, he appeared in the National Wrestling League's interpromotional "Lord of the Rings" tournament which included wrestlers from the NWL/HoPWF, NWA UK Hammerlock as well as former WWF, ECW and independent wrestlers.

== Championships and accomplishments ==
- All-American Wrestling Federation
  - AAWF Heavyweight Championship (1 time)
- Atlantic Terror Championship Wrestling
  - ATCW Heavyweight Championship (1 time)
- Maryland Championship Wrestling
  - MCW Hall of Fame (Class of 2010)
- Mid-Eastern Wrestling Federation
  - MEWF Heavyweight Championship (3 times)
  - MEWF Mid-Atlantic Championship (3 times)
- National Wrestling League/House of Pain Wrestling Federation
  - HoPWF Heavyweight Championship (1 time)
  - NWL/HoPWF Heavyweight Championship (1 time)
  - NWL/HoPWF Tag Team Championship (2 times) with "Diamond" Dave Donovan and Nikolai Volkoff
  - NWL Tag Team Championship (2 times) with Hard Rock Hamilton and Buzz Stryker/Axl Rotten
- Pro Wrestling Illustrated
  - PWI ranked him # 500 of the 500 best singles wrestlers of the PWI 500 in 1992
  - PWI ranked him # 184 of the 500 best singles wrestlers of the PWI 500 in 1993
- UWF Hardcore Wrestling
  - UWF Hardcore Championship (1 time)
