= North Carroll High School =

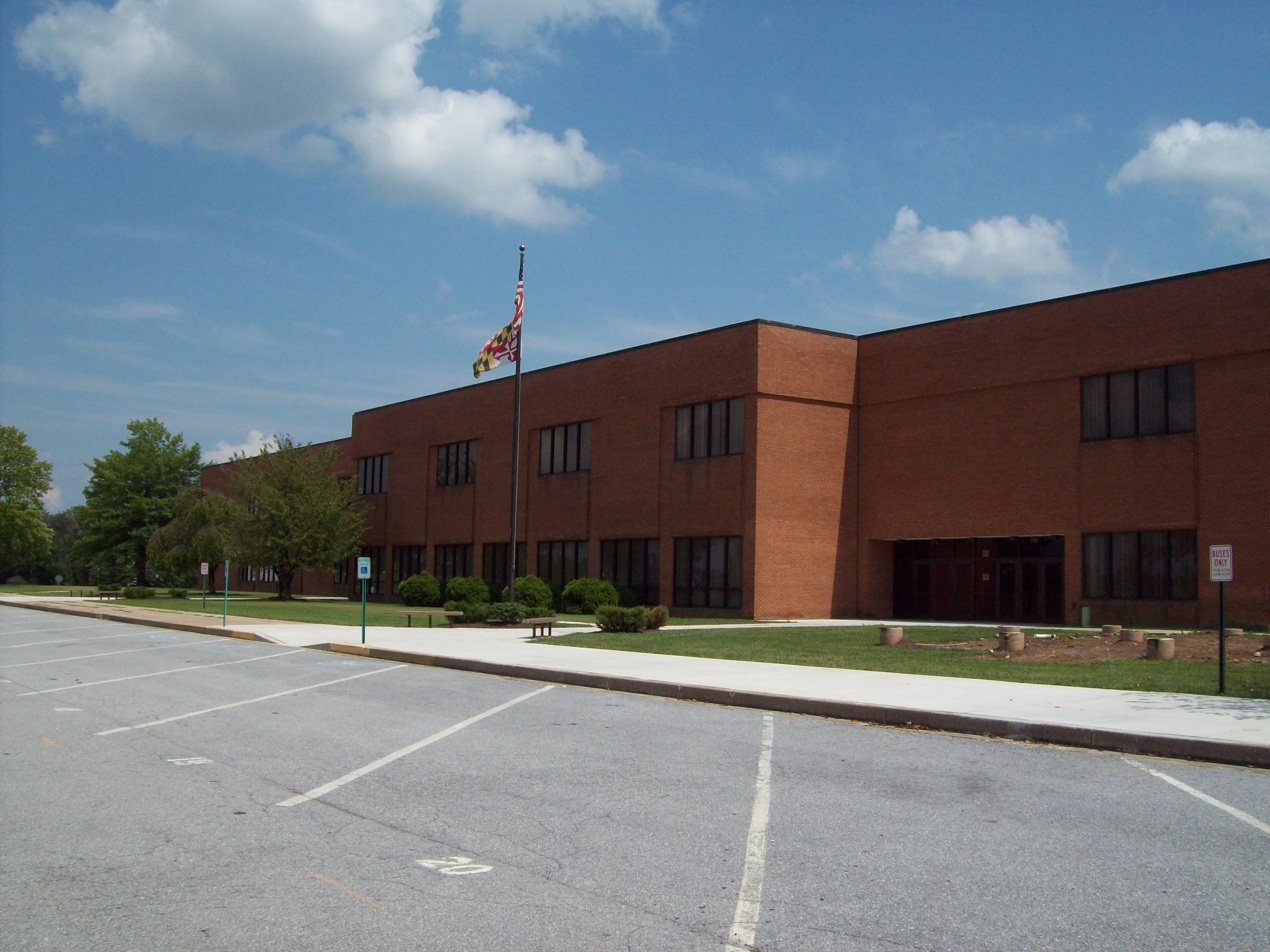

Location
- 1400 Panther Drive Hampstead, Maryland; United States
- Coordinates: 39.6100°N 76.8612°W

Information
- Type: Public Secondary
- Motto: Once a Panther, Always a Panther
- Established: 1956
- Closed: 2016
- School district: Carroll County Public Schools
- Principal: Kim Dolch
- Grades: 9-12
- Enrollment: 650
- Colors: Black, White, and Red
- Athletics: American High School Football, Baseball, Field Hockey, Soccer
- Mascot: Panther
- Website: http://www.carrollk12.org/nch/

North Carroll High School was a public high school located in Hampstead, Maryland, United States, in Carroll County.

The North Carroll High School building is located at 1400 Panther Drive. The school was one of three county schools that were closed in 2016 due to declining enrollment. The school mascot was a panther, and the school colors were red, white, and black. The school was a part of the Carroll County Public Schools system. The principal was Thomas Clowes.

== History ==
In September 1956, Manchester High School and Hampstead High School were consolidated into a new school, to be called North Carroll High School, in Greenmount. The school had 437 students and 20 faculty, and its first graduating class had 79 students. At that time, the school colors were red and gray.

It has been accredited by the Middle States Association of Colleges and Secondary Schools since 1960.

In 1962, the school had its name changed to "North Carroll Junior-Senior High School", due to the addition of 7th and 8th grade classes, for whom an additional facility was constructed.

Further expansion in the 1970s led to the construction of another new building in the current location near Hampstead, Maryland. 860 high school students and 45 staff members to the new building, the opening of which coincided with the name returning to North Carroll High School. This was also when the current school colors were established.

In 1985 an agriculture classroom and shop were added and the greenhouse relocated. In 2007 the shop closed and was replaced with an attendance room.

North Carroll High School celebrated its 50th anniversary during the 2006–2007 school year. North Carroll High School's student body had exceeded 1,800 students.

The student body of the school was split in the 2009-2010 school year with the opening of Manchester Valley High School in Manchester, Maryland. This split was due to over-population in the school. About 5-10 new portables were added to the school's campus to fit all the students into classes. The Board of Education had drawn out new boundaries for the school. They split the line between Manchester, a surrounding town, and Hampstead. The population of both these towns used to attend North Carroll High School and even a few from a third town called Finksburg. This was the cause of the continuous rise of population in the school. All Freshman, Sophomore, and Junior students living in Manchester were sent to the new high school. The Senior class of 2010 was allowed to stay at North Carroll High School.

In 2015, it was rumored that the school would be closed at the end of the 2015-2016 school year. However, Governor Larry Hogan allocated money to postpone the closure due to public disapproval of the closing.

On December 9, 2015 despite the public disapproval of the closing and offer of money from Governor Larry Hogan the Carroll County School Board voted to close the school.

== Students ==
The student population at North Carroll High School was steadily rising over the past 13 years.

Student population
2007	1,762
2006	1,764
2005	1,699
2004	1,613
2003	1,563
2002	1,519
2001	1,483
2000	1,467
1999	1,410
1998	1,349
1997	1,293
1996	1,226
1995	1,190
1994	1,120
1993	1,087

== Sports ==
North Carroll High School has won the following State Championships:

- Boys' Cross Country: 1985, 1988
- Girls' Cross Country: 1983, 1984, 1985, 1986, 2000
- Volleyball: 1985
- Field Hockey: 1977, 2013, 2014
- Wrestling: 1994
- Softball: 1978, 1979, 1981, 1986, 1990, 1991
- Boys' Track & Field: 1959
- Girls' Track & Field: 1984, 1985
- Girls' Indoor Track & Field: 2007
- Golf: 2010
- Boys' Soccer: 2013, 2015

== Notable alumni ==
- Katie Zaferes, triathlete
- Steve Suter, American and Canadian football player
