= Gillberg (wrestler) =

American professional wrestler

Personal information
- Born: Duane Gill; July 10, 1959 (age 67) Glen Burnie, Maryland, U.S.
- Children: 2

Professional wrestling career
- Ring name(s): Duane Gill; Dwayne Gill; Executioner #1; Gillberg; Pain; Terry Turtle
- Billed height: 6 ft 0 in (1.83 m)
- Billed weight: 227 lb (103 kg)
- Billed from: Atlanta, Georgia; Tarrytown, Texas (as Terry Turtle)
- Trained by: Bone Crushers Wrestling School; Larry Sharpe
- Debut: 1990
- Retired: February 28, 2020

Duane Gill (born July 10, 1959) is an American retired professional wrestler, best known for his appearances in the World Wrestling Federation (WWF) during the Attitude Era under the ring name Gillberg, a parody of then-rival promotion World Championship Wrestling's top star Goldberg. During his tenure in the WWF, Gill became a one-time Light Heavyweight Champion. He held the title for 15 months, becoming the longest reigning Light Heavyweight Champion as recognized by WWE. Gill retired on February 28, 2020.

== Professional wrestling career ==
=== Early career (1990–1994) ===
Gill made his debut on the American independent scene as a part of a masked tag team with Barry Hardy called The Lords of Darkness, with Hardy billed as Agony and Gill billed as Pain. On August 2, 1991, they defeated Cream Team (Dino Casanova and Rip Sawyer) to become the Mid-Eastern Wrestling Federation's first ever Tag Team Champions. The Lords participated in two of three 40-man battle royals held in 1992. in late 1993 and early 1994 he worked for Extreme Championship Wrestling.

=== World Wrestling Federation (1991–1995) ===
Gill (sometimes teaming with Barry Hardy) became a jobber with the WWF in 1991 usually appearing on WWF Superstars of Wrestling and WWF Wrestling Challenge losing to the likes of The Undertaker, Kamala, High Energy, The Texas Tornado, Sgt. Slaughter, Jim Duggan, The Bushwackers and The Beverly Brothers. Gill and Hardy competed in a battle royal becoming the second version of The Executioners and took part in a 40-man battle royal won by Tatanka. Gill and Hardy then went back to their real names and began competing on Monday Night Raw as well as WWF Superstars against several other tag teams losing to the likes of The Quebecers and The Steiner Brothers. One night they fought as The Toxic Turtles (dressed up as the Teenage Mutant Ninja Turtles) and won a victory over jobbers, but the gimmick was cut off. The Executioners split in early 1994, and Hardy left the company on April 18. Gill then began competing as an enhancement talent, losing to the likes of Mr. Perfect, 1-2-3 Kid, Razor Ramon, Doink, The British Bulldog, Tatanka and Adam Bomb. He left the company soon after.

=== World Championship Wrestling (1995) ===
Gill made a one-time appearance for World Championship Wrestling defeating Hugh Morrus by disqualification on October 18, 1995 (aired November 15).

=== Independent circuit (1995–1998) ===
After WWF, Gill would mainly work in the independents in the East Coast and Canada mostly as the Executioner.

=== Return to World Wrestling Federation/Entertainment/WWE (1998–2000) ===
==== J.O.B. Squad (1998–1999) ====
In November 1998, Gill made his return to the World Wrestling Federation at Survivor Series as Mankind's mystery opponent with a bald head. Vince McMahon seemingly facilitated Mankind's route to victory in a tournament for the vacant WWF Championship as he appeared to be McMahon's favorite to win. McMahon built up the suspense before the entrance by referring to Gill as a wrestler with an unmatched win–loss record. Although the statement was implied that Mankind's opponent won more than lost in his career, the exact opposite was true, and Gill was squashed by Mankind.

He later joined The J.O.B. Squad with Al Snow, Scorpio and Bob Holly. During this time, Gill became notable for "ending Marc Mero's career" when Mero challenged him to a match, announcing to the crowd that he would retire from wrestling if he could not beat Gill. Gill won the match with some help from the J.O.B. Squad, and Mero left the WWF, although he did not legit retire.

==== Light Heavyweight Champion (1998–2000) ====
On November 23, 1998, Gill won the Light Heavyweight Championship after defeating Christian on Raw. After a successful defense against Matt Hardy on the December 14, 1998 episode of Sunday Night Heat, Gill was given his most notable gimmick: "Gillberg," a parody of rival promotion World Championship Wrestling's top star Goldberg. When he became Gillberg, the original plan of the bookers was reputedly to have him lose 173 consecutive matches, parodying Goldberg's winning streak of 173 matches. The Gillberg character parodied numerous other aspects of Goldberg's character, such as his entrance being accompanied by the pre-recorded sound of a crowd chanting "Gillberg" (which was an allusion to WCW's alleged use of pre-recorded chants in Goldberg's usual entrance) and stage hands that would hold up sparklers (parodying Goldberg's pyrotechnics) and then spray the entrance way with fire extinguishers. He also had a dotted line "tattoo" on his right arm (parodying Goldberg's tribal tattoo) and would use the catchphrase "Who's First?" in reference not only to Goldberg's catchphrase "Who's Next?", but also to the fact that Gill would lose to each and every one of his opponents.

Gill made his Royal Rumble debut in 1999, but was immediately eliminated by Edge. Gill's only victory as Gillberg came on the February 8, 1999, edition of Raw when he defeated Goldust with help from former J.O.B. Squad member The Blue Meanie, who was feuding with Goldust at the time. By April 1999, he was taken off the main roster and worked in fewer matches. Gill lost to Tiger Ali Singh at the pay-per-view No Mercy (UK). He competed for the WWF Championship against Triple H in a losing effort on the August 31, 1999, edition of SmackDown!. For the remainder of 1999 he continued working in Maryland and the independents.

While he still came to the ring with the belt, the Light Heavyweight Championship was all but forgotten as Gill seldom defended the title on television or at house shows. After being off of WWF television for several months, Gill returned on the February 14, 2000, episode of Sunday Night Heat for one final match in order to lose the championship to the debuting Essa Rios. Upon losing the title, Gill's reign ended at 15 months, making him the longest reigning Light Heavyweight Champion in WWF history.

=== Independent circuit (2000–2003) ===
After leaving the WWF, Gill continued to use the Gillberg gimmick on the independent circuit, most prominently for Maryland Championship Wrestling until retiring in 2003.

=== WWE part-time appearances (2003–2021) ===
When Goldberg came to WWE in 2003, his first feud was against The Rock, who on the April 21, 2003 episode of Raw brought in Gill, once again under his Gillberg gimmick, to mock Goldberg. After beating up The Rock's security guards, who were trying to apprehend him for interrupting a concert "dedicated" to him, Gillberg attacked Goldberg, which prompted Goldberg to begin choking him. The Rock then attacked Goldberg from behind, after which both Gillberg and The Rock quickly ran out of the arena to avoid further conflict.

On December 10, 2007, Gill, now sporting two new tattoos on his left deltoid, returned to WWE television under his Gillberg name and gimmick for the 15th Anniversary of Raw. During the show, he participated in a 15-man battle royal against fourteen other former Raw wrestlers, but was the first man eliminated only a few seconds into the match by everyone.

In 2016, Gill returned to WWE, where he made a brief appearance on The Edge and Christian Show. Gillberg made a surprise appearance on the February 14, 2017 episode of Raw, coming to the ring in place of Goldberg before being attacked by Kevin Owens.

On the January 18, 2021 episode of Raw, Gillberg returned. John Morrison and The Miz teased that Goldberg would be on their talk show segment "The Dirt Sheet", but instead Gillberg came to the ring and had a short segment with a fake Drew McIntyre (played by David Krumholtz).

=== Return to the independent circuit (2009–2020) ===
In 2009, Gill came out of retirement and reunited with Barry Hardy. They disbanded in 2011.

On February 28, 2018, Gill won the IWC High Stakes Championship from independent wrestler Bulk Nasty. He was later challenged by James Ellsworth for a title-match on March 17, which Gill lost. On April 1, 2018, Gill teamed with Ellsworth to win the ACW Tag Team Championships. On February 28, 2020, Gill wrestled his last match against Ellsworth at an Adrenaline Wrestling show, winning the match.

== Personal life ==
Gill is married and has two adult children and a granddaughter. Gill operated an independent wrestling school in Severn, Maryland named Gillberg's Pro Wrestling Academy that opened in July 2010. On November 25, 2020, Gill suffered a heart attack, but eventually recovered.

== Championships and accomplishments ==
- Adrenaline Championship Wrestling
  - ACW Light Heavyweight Championship (1 time)
  - ACW Tag Team Championship (1 time) – with James Ellsworth
- Atlantic States Wrestling Alliance
  - ASWA Tag Team Championship (2 times) – with Agony
- East Coast Pro Wrestling
  - ECPW Tag Team Championship (1 time) – with Executioner #2
- Eastern Wrestling Federation
  - EWF Tag Team Championship (1 time) – with Agony
- International Wrestling Cartel
  - IWC High Stakes Championship (1 time)
- Maryland Championship Wrestling
  - MCW Hall of Fame (Class of 2009)
- Mid-Eastern Wrestling Federation
  - MEWF Tag Team Championship (1 time) – with Agony
- NWA New Jersey
  - NWA New Jersey Junior Heavyweight Championship (1 time)
- Pro Wrestling Illustrated
  - Ranked No. 120 of the top 500 singles wrestlers in the PWI 500 in 1999
- World Wrestling Alliance
  - WWA World Tag Team Championship (5 times) – with Barry Hardy (3) and Wayne Gill (2)
- World Wrestling Federation
  - WWF Light Heavyweight Championship (1 time)
