= List of former Independent Professional Wrestling Alliance personnel =

The Independent Professional Wrestling Alliance was a professional wrestling promotion based in Alexandria, Virginia from 1995 to 2001. Former employees in the IPWA consisted of professional wrestlers, managers, play-by-play and color commentators, announcers, interviewers and referees.

== Alumni ==
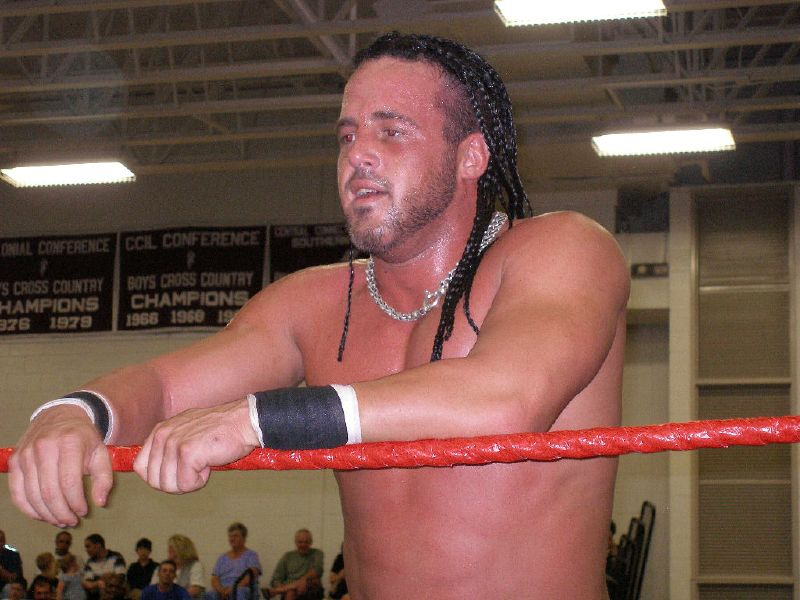
Joey Matthews

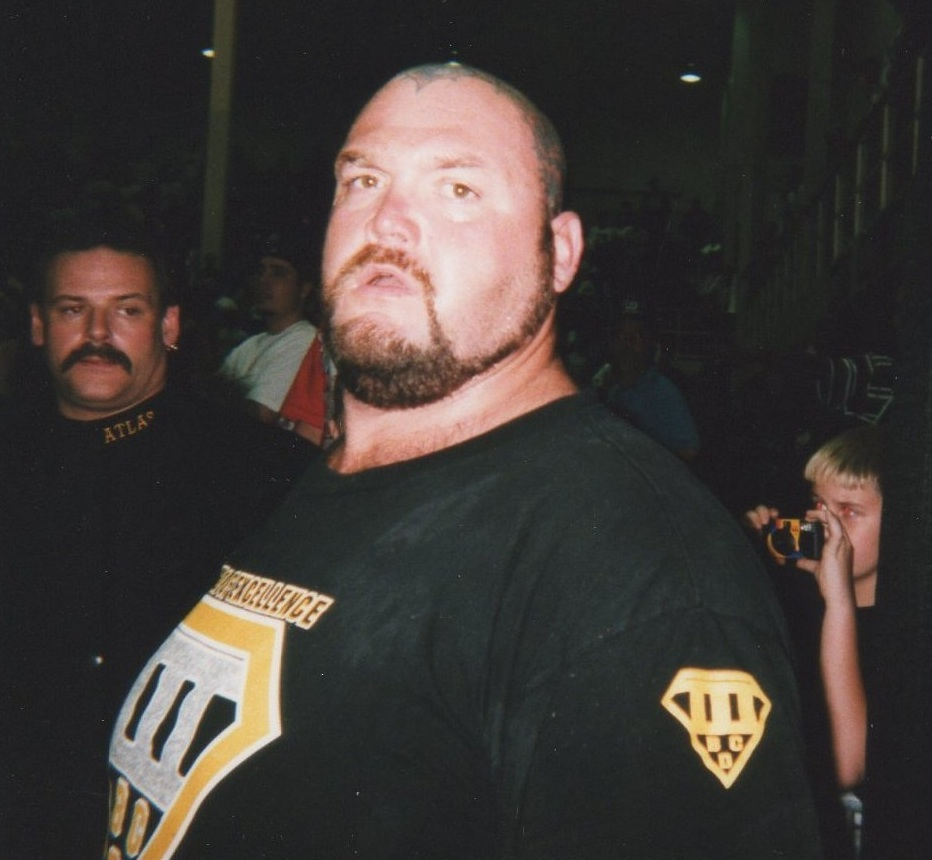
Bam Bam Bigelow

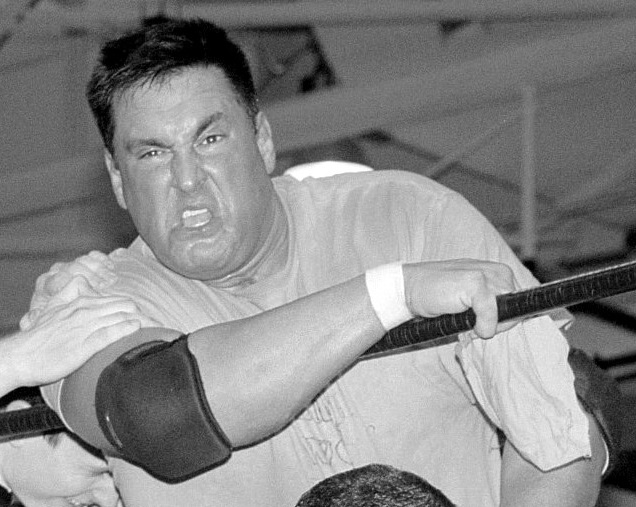
Tom Brandi

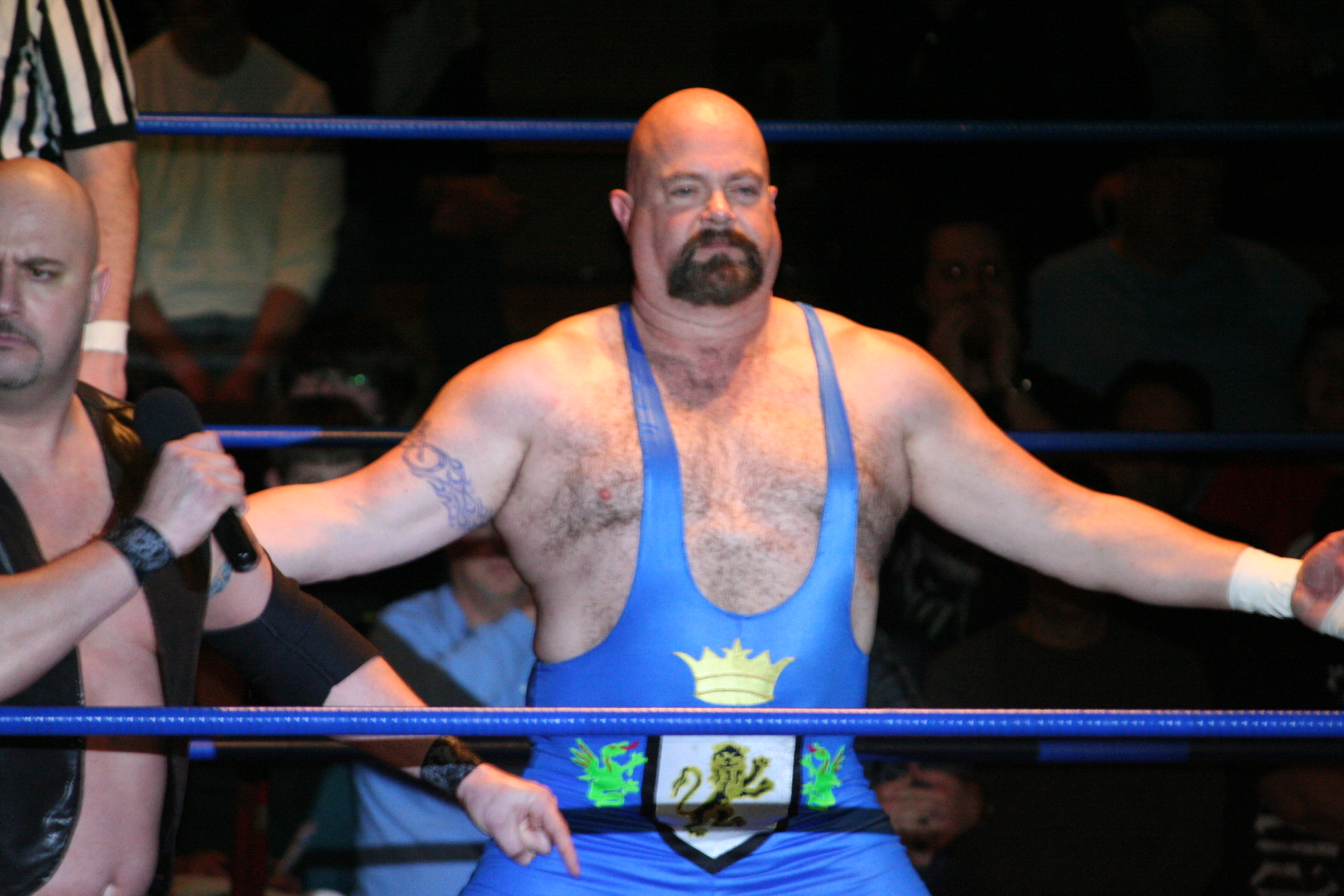
Cueball Carmichael

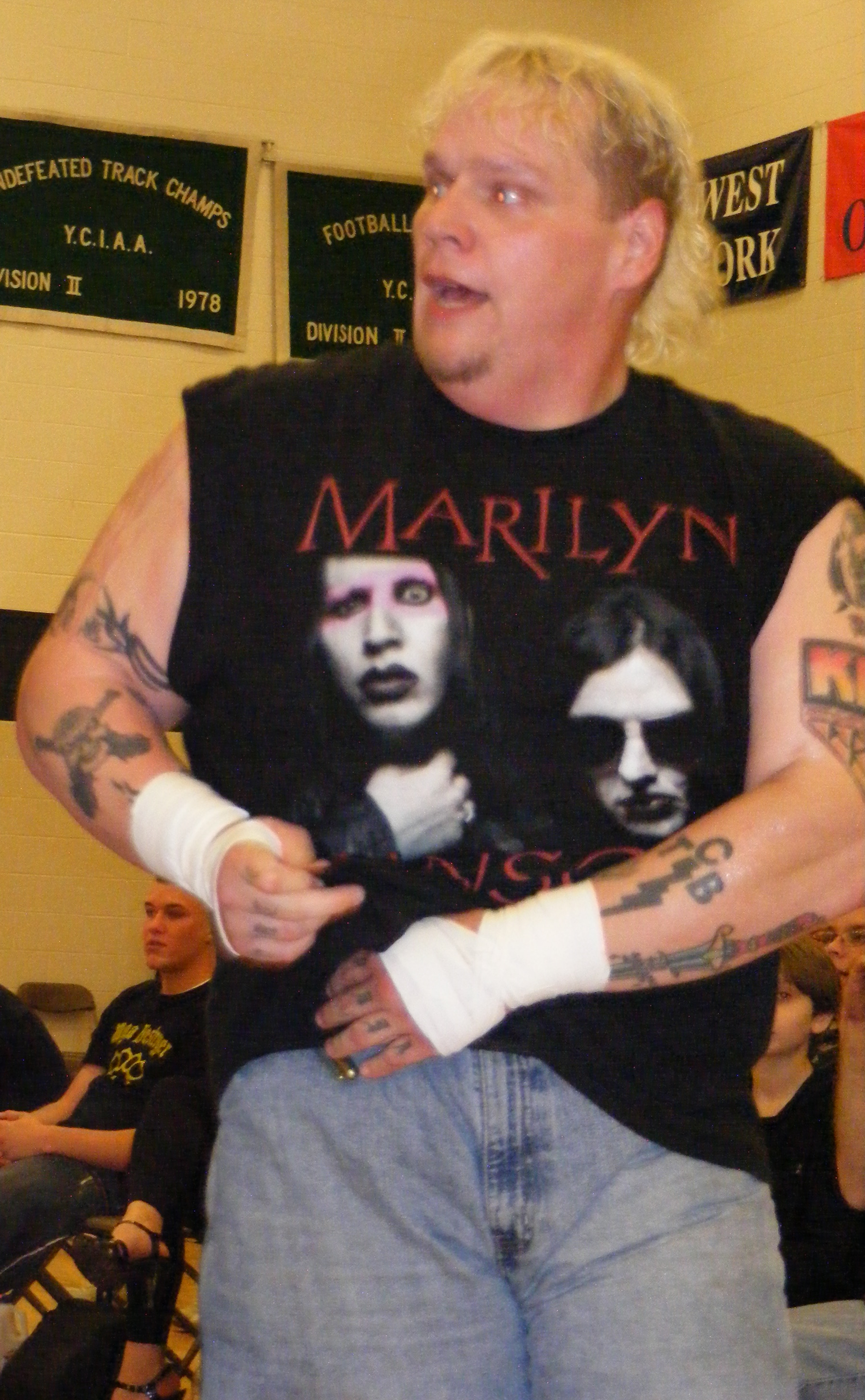
Axl Rotten

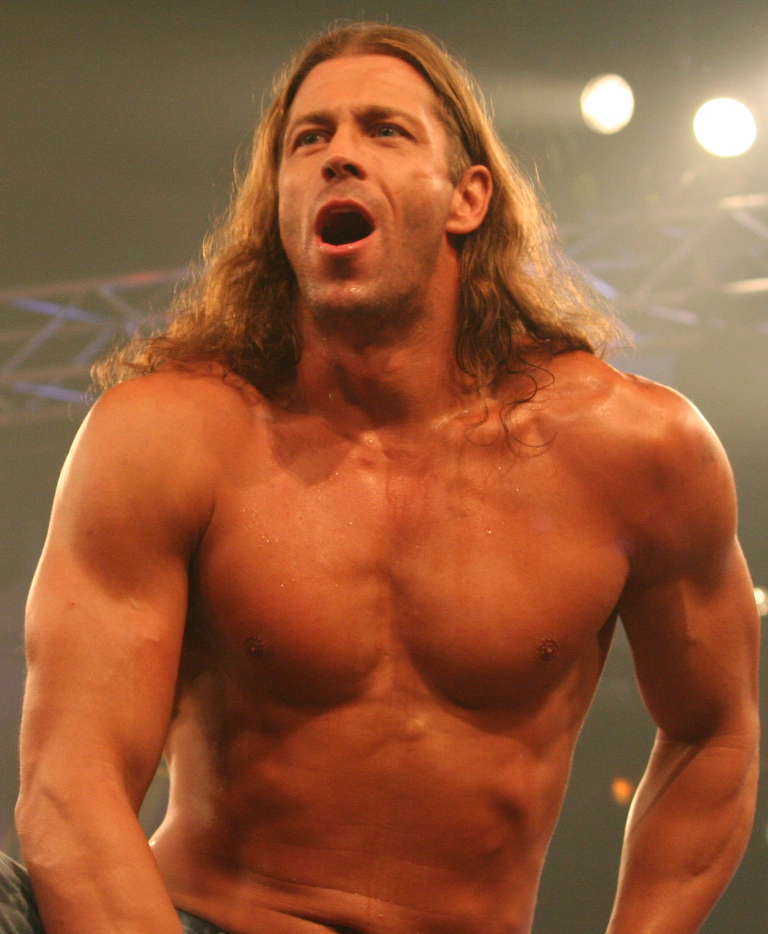
Stevie Richards

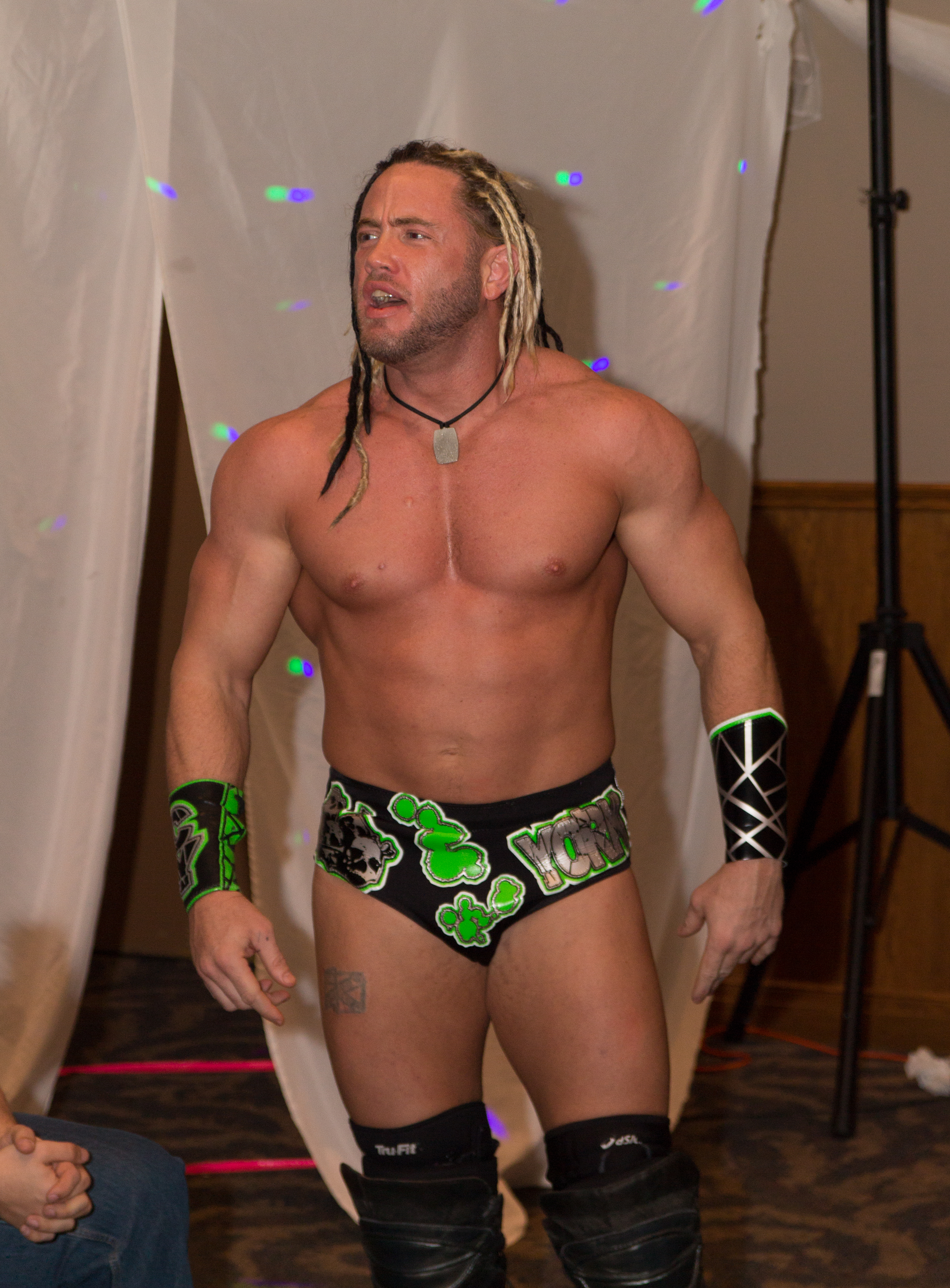
Christian York

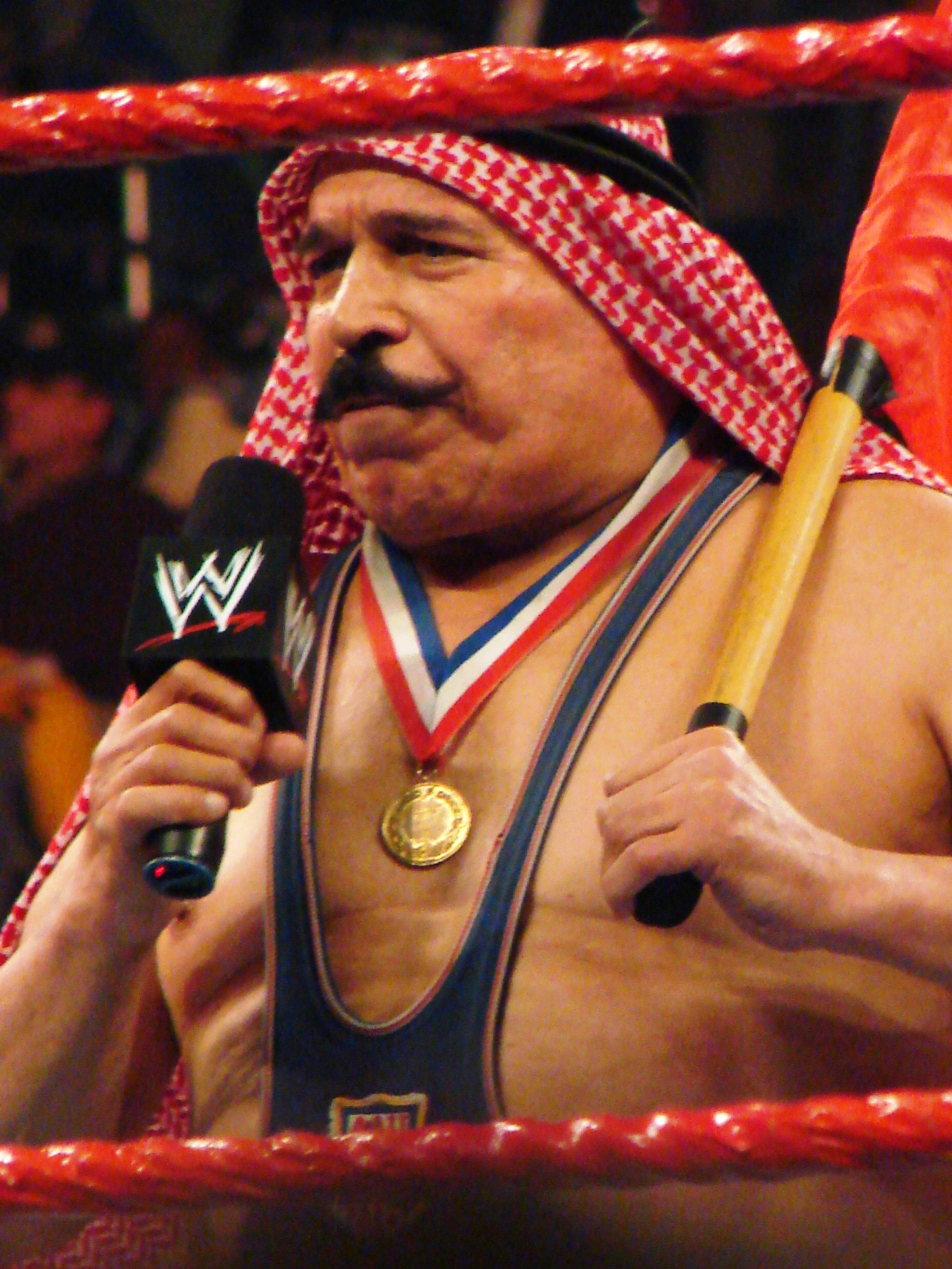
The Iron Sheik

=== Male wrestlers ===
Birth name:	Ring name(s):	Tenure:	Notes
Roger Anderson	Roger Anderson	1996–1998	
Douglas Becker	Adam Flash	1996–1998	
James Bednarski	Scott Putski	1997	
Jeffrey Beltzner^{†}	Brick Bronsky	1997	
Scott Bigelow^{†}	Bam Bam Bigelow	1996	
Adam Birch	Joey Matthews	1996–2000	
Tully Blanchard	Tully Blanchard	1997	
Matt Bowman	Jimmy Cicero	1996–2000	
Tom Brandi	Johnny Gunn / Salvatore Sincere / Tom Brandi / The Patriot	1996–1998; 1999–2000	
Timothy Burke^{†}	Lucifer	1996	
Tom Carter	Reckless Youth	1997	
Steve Corino	Steve Corino	1996–1998	
William DeMott II	Hugh Morrus	1997	
Anthony Durante^{†}	Pitbull #2	1998	
Michael Durham^{†}	Johnny Grunge	1997	
Bill Eadie	Demolition Ax	1997	
William Ensor^{†}	Buddy Landel	1998–1999	
Christopher Ford	Devon Storm	1997	
Richard Fuller	Rick Fuller	1997	
Glenn Gilbertti	Disco Inferno	1997	
Duane Gill	Gillberg	1999^{WWF}	
Matt Griffin	Jacey North	1999–2000	
William Happer	Otto Schwanz	1997–1999	
Dave Henderson	Omega/Weapon Omega	1998-2000	
Brian Howser^{†}	Shane Shamrock	1998	
Christopher Jackson	Cueball Carmichael	1996–2000	
William Jones	Chilly Willy	1999	
Jake Kemmerer	Bad Crew #1 / Dog	1996	
Pat Kenney	Lance Diamond	1998	
Ronald Knight	Jason Knight	1997	
Brian Knighton^{†}	Axl Rotten	1996; 1998	
Edward Leslie	The Booty Man	1996	
Michael Manna	Stevie Richards	1998	
Mike Maraldo	Ace Darling	1997	
Daniel McDevitt	Corporal Punishment	1996–2000	
Jack McDonald^{†}	Big Slam / Big Slam Vader	1996–2000	
Jim Neidhart^{†}	Jim Neidhart	1996	
Paul Olsek, Jr.	Bad Crew #2 / Rose	1996	
Glen Osbourne	Glen Osbourne	1996	
Christopher Pallies^{†}	King Kong Bundy	1997–1999	
Frank Parker	Frank Parker	1996–1998	
Josip Peruzović^{†}	Nikolai Volkoff	1996	
Alfred Poling	911	1997	
Jonathan Rechner^{†}	Abuddah Singh	1996	
James Reiher^{†}	Jimmy Snuka	1997	
Glen Ruth	Headbanger Thrasher	1996	
Dan Severn	Dan Severn	1996	
Mark Shrader	Mark Shrader	1996; 1998–1999	
Chad Slivenski	Chad Austin	1996	
Lester Speight	Rasta the Voodoo Man	1998	
Jason Spence	Christian York	1997–2000	
Robert Starr	Bob Starr	1996	
Hossein Vaziri	The Iron Sheik	1996; 1998	
Charles Warrington	Headbanger Mosh	1996	
Billy Wiles	Bill Wiles	1996	
Chuck Williams^{†}	The Rockin' Rebel	1996	
Brian Wohl	Julio Sanchez / Julio Fantastico	1997–2000	
Gary Wolfe	Pitbull #1	1998	
Chris Wright	C. W. Anderson	1997	
Doug Yasinsky	Doug Flex	1997	
Unknown	Doink the Clown	1997	
Unknown	Frank Stalletto	1997–1999	
Unknown	Mike Khoury	1996	
Unknown	Romeo Valentino	1996; 1998	

=== Female wrestlers ===
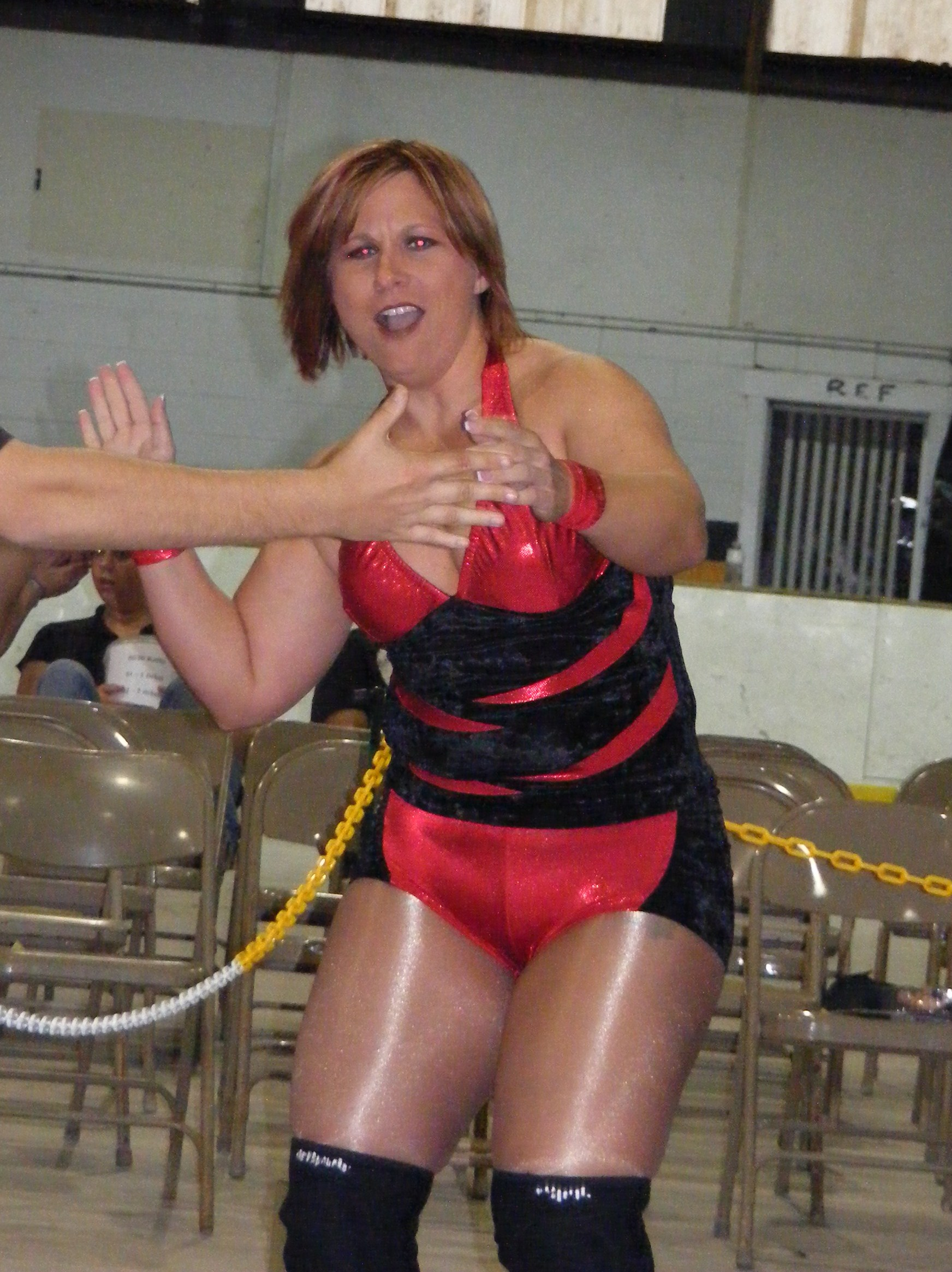
Lexie Fyfe

Birth name:	Ring name(s):	Tenure:	Notes
Marybeth Grant	Lexie Fyfe	1998–1999	
Malia Hosaka	Malia Hosaka	1996–1997	
Debbie Szostecki	Debbie Combs	1996–1997	
Unknown	Brandi Wine	1998–1999	
Unknown	Rustee "The Fox" Thomas	1999	

=== Midget wrestlers ===
Birth name:	Ring name(s):	Tenure:	Notes
Louis Waterhouse Jr.	Little Louie	1997	
Unknown	King Sleazy	1997	

=== Stables and tag teams ===
Tag team/Stable(s)	Members	Tenure(s)
The Bad Boyz	Dan Rage and Max Intensity	1996
The Bad Crew	Dog and Rose	1996
Dangerous Minds	Toad and Lodi	1998
Darkside	Glen Osbourne and The Rockin' Rebel	1996
Death & Destruction	Frank Parker and Roger Anderson	1996–1998
The Dream Team	Sean Powers and Billy Simmons	1996
The Extremists	Ace Darling and Devon Storm	1997
The Fraternity	Brian Perry and Sean Powers	1995–1996
The Gambini Family	Lance Diamond, Jimmy Cicero, Christian York, Dan Rage and Vinnie Gambini	1998
The Headbangers	Headbanger Mosh and Headbanger Thrasher	1996
The Hollywood Hunks	Lucifer and Bob Starr	1996
Lethal Weapon	Adam Flash and Steve Corino	1997
Menace 2 Society	Adam Flash, Romeo Valentino and Quinn Nash	1996
The Pitbulls	Pitbull#1 and Pitbull#2	1998

=== Managers and valets ===
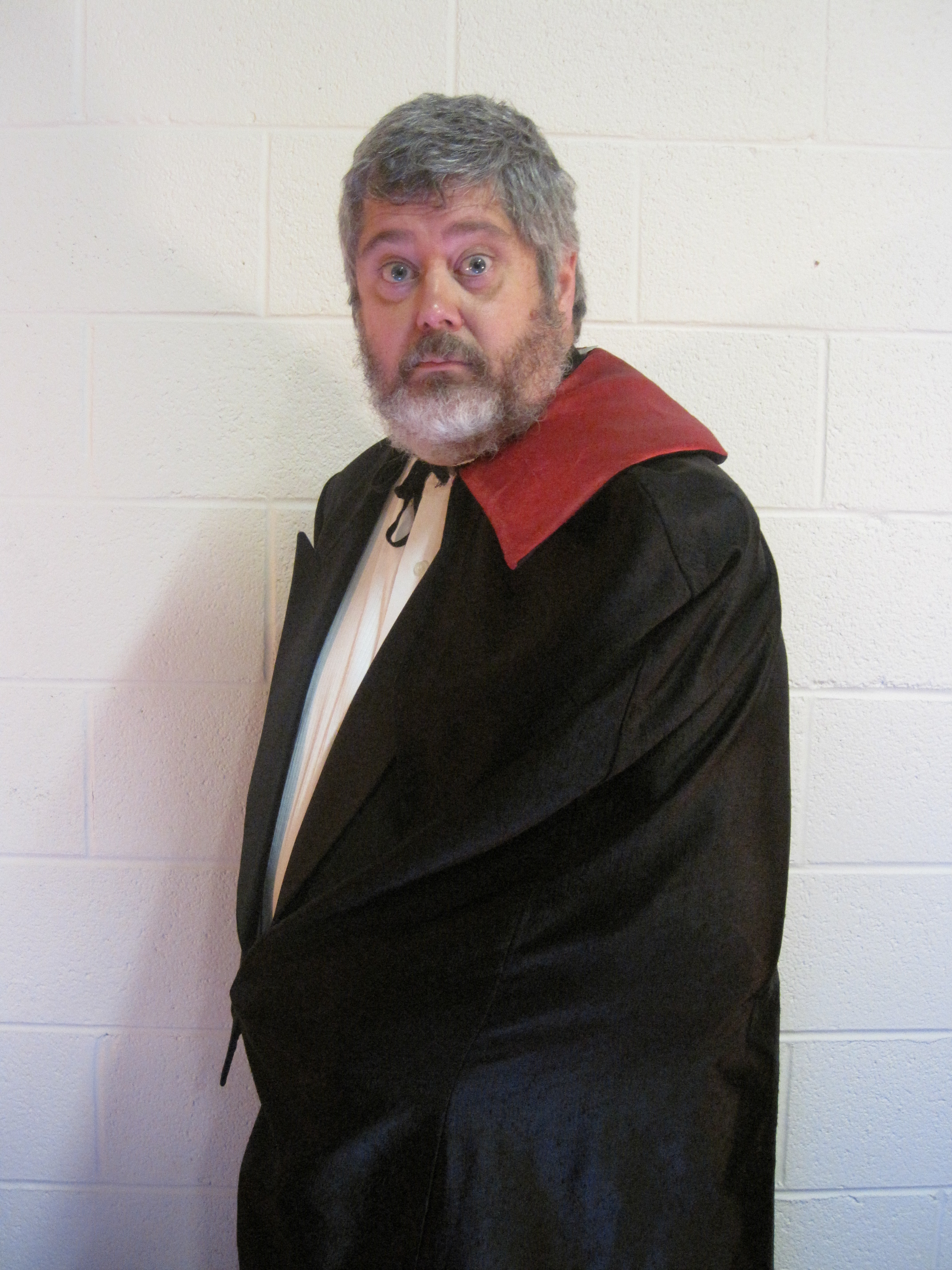
Count Grog

Birth name:	Ring name(s):	Tenure:	Notes
Angel Amoroso	Angel	1996	
Norman Connors	Notorious Norm	1998	
Tom Cusati	Royce C. Profit	1996–1997	
Melissa Hiatt	Missy Hyatt	1997	
Greg Mosorjak	Count Grog	1996; 1998–2000	
Unknown	Candie	2000	
Unknown	Damien Kane	1996	
Unknown	Diamond	1996	
Unknown	Eddie Reality	1996	
Unknown	Ginger	2000	
Unknown	Stud Lee Osborne	1996	
Unknown	"Material Boy" Thomas Rodman	1997	
Unknown	Vinnie Gambini	1997–1999	

=== Commentators and interviewers ===
Birth name:	Ring name(s):	Tenure:	Notes
Kevin Heilbronner	Kevin Carson	1995–2001	Ring announcer
Unknown	Dustin Starr	1999	
Unknown	Travis Bradshaw	1999	

=== Referees ===
Birth name:	Ring name(s):	Tenure:	Notes
Matt Griffin	Matt Griffin	1999	
Jeff Jones	Jeff Jones	1998	
Unknown	Barry Roberts	1998–1999	
Unknown	Charles Richardson	1996	
Unknown	Dave King	1996	
Unknown	Thomas Robinson	1999	

=== Other personnel ===
Birth name:	Ring name(s):	Tenure:	Notes
Jeff Amdur	Jeff Amdur	1998	Timekeeper
Charles Hart	Earl the Pearl	1999	Timekeeper
Kevin Heilbronner	Kevin Carson	1995–2000	Promoter
Christopher Jackson	Cueball Carmichael	1995–2000	Promoter
F. Simon Williams	F. Simon Williams	1998–1999	IPWA Commissioner

Notes
^{†} Indicates they are deceased.
^{‡} Indicates they died while they were employed with the Independent Professional Wrestling Alliance.
^{MEWF} Indicates they were part of a talent exchange with the Mid-Eastern Wrestling Federation.
^{WWF} Indicates they were part of a talent exchange with the World Wrestling Federation.
