= Joe Thunder =

American wrestler (born 1968)

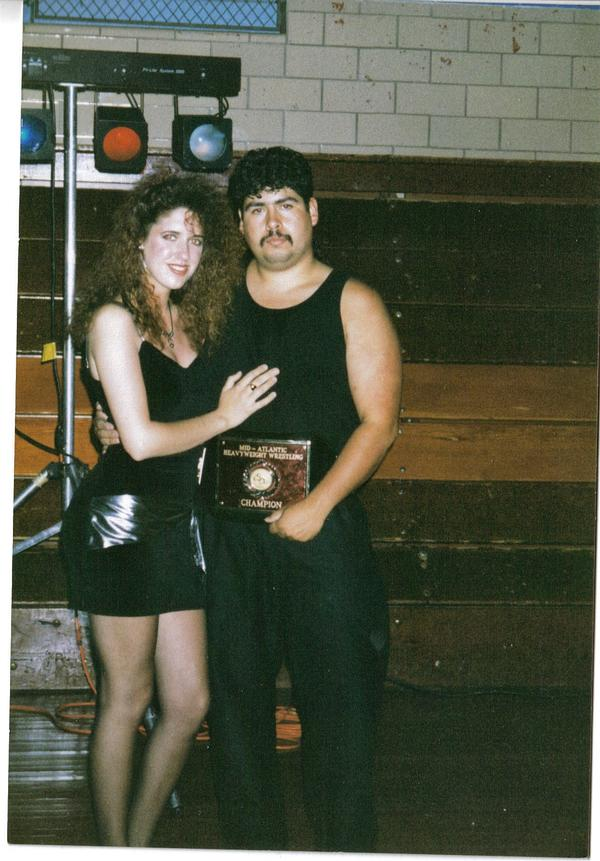
- Thunder in 1994 with manager Isis

Personal information
- Born: Joseph Anthony Carter; August 26, 1968 (age 57) Long Beach, California, United States
- Website: Joe Thunder on Myspace

Professional wrestling career
- Ring name: Joe Thunder
- Debut: 1992
- Retired: 2004

Joseph Anthony Carter (born 26 August 1968), better known by his ring name Joe Thunder, is a retired American professional wrestler and trainer who competed on the East Coast and Mid-Atlantic independent circuit during the 1990s and early 2000s, primarily working for the Mid-Eastern Wrestling Federation in Essex, Maryland during his 12-year career. He also made occasional appearances in Eastern Championship Wrestling and Cueball Carmichael's Independent Professional Wrestling Alliance.

In professional wrestling, Carter is a former triple crown champion having won the MEWF Heavyweight Championship, MEWF Mid-Atlantic Heavyweight Championship three times, and MEWF Tag Team Championship a record six-times. He was an accomplished "tag team" specialist during his time in the promotion winning the tag team belts with Mad Dog O'Malley, "Hollywood" Bob Starr, and Steve Camry. He and Camry, together known as The KPA, reunited years later at MCW's 1st annual "Legends of Maryland" show in 2009.

Carter is also notable for taking part in the MEWF's first "gimmick" matches including the promotion's first three steel cage matches, two ladder matches, and first strap match; this also included in two later shoot fights with the 450 lbs. superheavyweight Mad Dog O'Malley. He also worked as an instructor at the "Brain Buster's Pro Wrestling Academy", the MEWF's official training facility, where he was involved in the early training of future Ring of Honor star Ruckus.

== Career ==
=== Mid-Eastern Wrestling Federation (1992-1994) ===
Born in Long Beach, California, Joe Carter spent much of his early life moving throughout different parts of the country from "Hawaii to Atlanta and every state in-between" until eventually settling in Baltimore, Maryland. He was working as a bouncer prior to entering professional wrestling. Carter made his debut for the Mid-Eastern Wrestling Federation in 1992. One of his earliest matches for the promotion was at an MEWF house show in Pasadena, Maryland against Rick Savage on April 10, 1992; he also teamed with Johnny Blaze against the Rude Crue a month later. A year later, on November 14, 1993, Carter took part in an 8-man tag team elimination match teaming with Mike Khoury, Tommy Dreamer, and Max Moon against MEWF Mid-Atlantic Heavyweight Champion "Hollywood" Bob Starr, Tommy Lee Manson, Max Thrasher, and Duane Gill in Essex, Maryland. Although he was among the wrestlers eliminated, his team ended up winning the match with Khoury as the team's sole survivor and was awarded the Mid-Atlantic title as per the result of a pre-match stipulation. Thunder would later win the title from Khoury in Middle River on February 25, 1994. His first championship reign lasted almost nine months, successfully defending the title against a young Shane Shamrock among others, before losing the title to the Ultimate Comet in Hampstead, Maryland on November 12, 1994. During this period Carter participated in the MEWF's very first specialty matches. He took part in the promotion's first three steel cage matches, two ladder matches, and strap match. In addition, according to Carter, he participated in two shoot fights with the 450 lbs. Mad Dog O'Malley.

=== Mid-Eastern Wrestling Federation (1995-1997) ===
By 1995, Carter was among the promotion's rising stars. At an MEWF show on March 26, 1995, Carter won a 10-man battle royal last eliminating Bob Starr. Other participants included the Kabuki Kid, Morgus the Maniac, "Outrageous" Ricky Lane, Johnny Taylor, Quinn Nash, Mark Shrader, DP Ferguson, and Billy Brat. He also formed a brief tag team with Mad Dog O'Malley that summer and defeated Michael Sweet and Rockin' Rebel (substituting for Sweet's Models Inc. partner Johnny Handsome) in Annapolis for the MEWF Tag Team Championship on July 8. They lost the titles to Quinn Nash and Adam Flash in Essex the next day. Later that year, on December 3, 1995, Carter defeated Corporal Punishment for the MEWF Heavyweight Championship; sources differ as to whether he lost it to Corporal Punishment the next day or to Johnny Gunn on March 17, 1996. On April 4, Carter interfered in a three-way match between Gunn, Corporal Punishment, and Axl Rotten at the MEWF Arena in Essex; he also teamed with Gunn in a tag team match against Corporal Punishment and Axl Rotten. Carter would, however, regain the MEWF Mid-Atlantic title from Corporal Punishment on June 6 of that year. He lost the title to Knuckles Zanwich three weeks later. Later during the year, he wrestled the Cat Burglar and, at the MEWF's "Winter Warfare" supercard, Extreme Championship Wrestling's Jason Knight in Baltimore.

On April 27, 1997, Carter was challenged by another ECW star, Raven, as well another meeting against Knuckles Zandwich in June. Carter also feuded with Lucifer that summer and, on September 18, 1997, joined together with Gino Caruso to face Lucifer and his one-time tag team partner Mad Dog O'Malley. He also worked for a time as an instructor at the MEWF's official training facility, the "Brain Buster's Pro Wrestling Academy", where he was among the staff involved in training Ruckus.

=== Mid-Eastern Wrestling Federation and retirement (1998-2004) ===
Carter formed another tag team the following year, this time with Bob Starr, and won the tag team titles from Marvelous Inc. (Jimmy Jannetty and Ramblin' Rich Myers) in Baltimore on September 18, 1998. Though dropping the belts to The Bad Crew (Bad Crew #1 and #2) after only a few weeks, he remained in the MEWF's tag team division for the remainder of his career. On January 7, 2000, he and Mad Dog O'Malley were awarded the tag team titles after their opponents, The Good, The Bad and The Ugly, broke up. The titles were vacated shortly after. He and Steve Camry, together called The KPA, also enjoyed a brief reign as tag team champions. They defeated Derek Wayne and Derek Frazier for the belts on June 9, 2002, but lost them to Lucifer and Max Thrasher that same night. Though spending the majority of his decade long career in the MEWF, he also wrestled occasionally in Cueball Carmichael's Independent Professional Wrestling Alliance in Virginia. He retired from pro wrestling following the close of the MEWF in 2004. Since leaving the business, Carter continues to reside in Baltimore, with his young daughter Sarina, where he works as a Union Electrician L.U. 24.

On November 7, 2009, Carter made a one-time appearance for Maryland Championship Wrestling at its 1st annual "Legends of Maryland" show at the New Green Room in Dundalk, Maryland. It was at the event that, reuniting with Steve Camry, The KPA defeated The Harbor City Hit Squad (Drolix & Kindred). Other MEWF originals in attendance included Bob Starr, the Cat Burglar, Lucifer, Chad Austin, Ricky Blues, and Headbanger Mosh. He was also at "Night of Maryland Legends II" the following year, on October 30, 2010, but did not wrestle on the card.

== Championships and accomplishments ==
- Mid-Eastern Wrestling Federation
  - MEWF Heavyweight Championship (1 time)
  - MEWF Mid-Atlantic Championship (3 times)
  - MEWF Tag Team Championship (6 times) - with Mad Dog O'Malley (2), Bob Starr (1), and Steve Camry
