= NWL Cruiserweight Championship =

Professional wrestling championship

Details
- Promotion: National Wrestling League
- Date established: December 13, 1997
- Current champion(s): Blackhawk
- Date won: July 31, 2007
Statistics
- First champion(s): Fumar
- Most reigns: Hyjinx (7)
- Longest reign: Flex Fenom (374 days)
- Shortest reign: Jimmy Jessup (3 days)

The NWL Cruiserweight Championship is the top professional wrestling Cruiserweight title in the National Wrestling League promotion. It was created on December 13, 1997, when Fumar defeated Shorty Smalls in Moorefield, West Virginia to become the first champion. The title is defended primarily in the Mid-Atlantic and East Coast, most often in Hagerstown, Maryland, but also in Pennsylvania and West Virginia. There are 16 recognized known champions with a total of 50 title reigns.

== Title history ==
=== NWL Cruiserweight Championship ===
| Wrestler: | Times: | Date: | Location: | Notes: |
|---|---|---|---|---|
| Fumar | 1 | December 13, 1997 | Moorefield, West Virginia | Defeated Shorty Smalls to become first champion. |
The title is vacated in 1998.
| Slickyboy | 1 | September 26, 1998 | Hagerstown, Maryland | Defeated Mike Gunner to win vacant title. |
| The New Jersey Devil | 1 | November 8, 1998 | McConnellsburg, Pennsylvania | |
The title is vacated on March 25, 1999.
| John Balsamo | 1 | April 8, 1999 | Waynesboro, Pennsylvania | Defeated Aidean to win vacant title. |
| Flex Fenom | 1 | September 7, 1999 | Hagerstown, Maryland | |
| Paul Beswick | 1 | October 31, 1999 | Hagerstown, Maryland | Awarded title via forfeit when Flex Fenom failed to appear. |
The title is vacated in December 1999.
| John Balsamo | 2 | January 4, 2000 | Hagerstown, Maryland | Defeated OGB and Hyjinx in a three way dance to win vacant title. |
| OGB | 1 | May 18, 2000 | Hagerstown, Maryland | Won title via forfeit when Balsamo was unable to appear. |
The title is vacated on September 1, 2000, when OGB is released from the promotion.
| Hyjinx | 1 | September 25, 2000 | Hagerstown, Maryland | Won a tournament to win vacant title. |
| John Balsamo | 3 | December 16, 2000 | Hagerstown, Maryland | Awarded title via forfeit when Hyjinx failed to appear. |
The title is vacated on March 16, 2001.
| Chuckie Manson | 1 | March 29, 2001 | Cumberland, Maryland | Defeated Blackhawk in a singles match to win the vacant title. |
| Flex Fenom | 2 | June 16, 2001 | Hagerstown, Maryland | |
| "Wild Thing" Adam Brown | 1 | June 25, 2002 | Hagerstown, Maryland | |
| Flex Fenom | 3 | July 4, 2002 | Hagerstown, Maryland | |
| Aidean | 1 | September 28, 2002 | Greencastle, Pennsylvania | Defeated Flex Fenom, Hyjinx and Fumar in a Four corners match. |
| Hyjinx | 2 | October 26, 2002 | Blue Ridge Summit, Pennsylvania | Hyjinx and Fumar defeated Flex Fenom and Aidean in a special stipulation tag team match. |
| The Freak | 1 | November 19, 2002 | Hagerstown, Maryland | Defeated Hyjinx and Chuckie Manson in a triple threat match. |
| Flex Fenom | 4 | February 11, 2003 | Hagerstown, Maryland | |
| The Freak | 2 | February 22, 2003 | Hagerstown, Maryland | |
| Nomad | 1 | March 4, 2003 | Hagerstown, Maryland | |
| Hyjinx | 3 | April 19, 2003 | Hagerstown, Maryland | |
| Jerkface | 1 | May 4, 2003 | Hagerstown, Maryland | |
The title is vacated in May 2003 when Jerkface suffers an injury.
| OGB | 2 | May 20, 2003 | Hagerstown, Maryland | Won battle royal for vacant title. |
| Hyjinx | 4 | June 20, 2003 | Martinsburg, Pennsylvania | Defeated OGB and Nomad in a three way dance. |
| OGB | 3 | July 29, 2003 | | Awarded title by forfeit when Hyjinx failed to appear. |
| Hyjinx | 5 | October 4, 2003 | | Defeated OGB, John Balsamo and Fumar in Four Corners match. |
| OGB | 4 | October 18, 2003 | Gettysburg, Pennsylvania | |
| Hyjinx | 6 | November 15, 2003 | Newville, Pennsylvania | Defeated OGB, Chad Bowman, and Brandon Mercury in Four Corners match. |
| OGB | 5 | December 13, 2003 | Chambersburg, Pennsylvania | |
| Chad Bowman | 1 | February 14, 2004 | Blue Ridge Summit, Pennsylvania | |
The title is vacated on March 6, 2004, when Chad Bowman is stripped of the title for missing a scheduled title defense.
| Hyjinx | 7 | March 9, 2004 | Newville, Pennsylvania | Defeated OGB in a Best of 3 Falls match to win vacant title. |
| Chad Bowman | 2 | July 17, 2004 | Martinsburg, West Virginia | Won title in a No Disqualification match. |
| Fumar | 2 | April 2, 2005 | Hagerstown, Maryland | |
The title is vacated in May 2005.
| Jerkface | 2 | May 21, 2005 | Newville, Pennsylvania | Won a tag team elimination match. |
| "Jackpot" Jimmy Jessup | 1 | August 6, 2005 | Hagerstown, Maryland | Defeated Jerkface, Stefan Slayter and Jeremy Stoned in a 4-Way Dance. |
| Doken | 1 | August 9, 2005 | Hagerstown, Maryland | Won title by forfeit when Jimmy Jessup failed to appear. |
| Jerkface | 3 | September 10, 2005 | Waynesboro, Pennsylvania | |
The title is vacated on September 15, 2005.
| Jimmy Jessup | 2 | October 15, 2005 | Martinsburg, West Virginia | Defeated Robbie Paige, Dr. Spider and Harlen Kano in a 4-Way Dance to win the vacant title. |
| Ian Decay | 1 | October 18, 2005 | Hagerstown, Maryland | |
| Chuckie Manson | 2 | November 19, 2005 | Newville, Pennsylvania | Won in Title vs. Title match. |
The title is vacated on December 17, 2005, when Chucky Manson retired.
| Blackhawk | 1 | December 17, 2005 | Martinsburg, West Virginia | Won battle royal. |
| Chris Cline | 1 | January 21, 2006 | Hagerstown, Maryland | |
| Crazy Shea | 1 | March 7, 2006 | Hagerstown, Maryland | Won title in a Best of 3 Falls match. |
| Blackhawk | 2 | March 21, 2006 | Hagerstown, Maryland | |
The title is vacated on April 1, 2006, when Blackhawk is unable to compete due to injury.
| Chris Cline | 2 | April 1, 2006 | Hagerstown, Maryland | Defeated Jeremy Stoned, Tommy Mandrake and The Freak in a 4 Way Dance to win the vacant title. |
| Blackhawk | 3 | April 8, 2006 | Hagerstown, Maryland | Won in a "No Count Out - No DQ" match. |
The title is vacated on June 17, 2006.
| Dexter Alexander | 1 | July 15, 2006 | Martinsburg, West Virginia | Won title in a 4-Way Dance with Jeremy Stoned, Harlen Kano and Blackhawk. Following the match, it was found that Alexander was over the weight limit and was stripped of the title. |
| Blackhawk | 4 | July 15, 2006 | Martinsburg, West Virginia | Awarded title when Dexter Alexander was stripped of the championship. |
| Jimmy Jessup | 3 | July 7, 2007 | Hagerstown, Maryland | Won title by forfeit when Blackhawk was unable to compete due to an ankle injury. |
| Blackhawk | 5 | July 31, 2007 | Hagerstown, Maryland | |

=== NWL/HoPWF Luchadore Championship ===
| Wrestler: | Times: | Date: | Location: | Notes: |
|---|---|---|---|---|
| Spyral | 1 | November 1, 2003 | Blue Ridge Summit, Pennsylvania | Won Royal Rumble to become first champion. |
| Sam Sanders | 1 | March 6, 2004 | Newville, Pennsylvania | |
| Crazy Shea | 1 | May 29, 2004 | | Awarded title via forfeit when Sam Sanders failed to appear. |
The title retired on July 2, 2004.
