= MEWF Mid-Atlantic Championship =

Professional wrestling championship

MEWF Mid-Atlantic Heavyweight Championship

Details
- Promotion: Mid-Eastern Wrestling Federation
- Date established: March 6, 1993
- Date retired: 2004
Statistics
- First champion(s): Bob Starr
- Final champion(s): Qenaan Creed (won March 28, 2004)
- Most reigns: Bob Starr (5)
- Longest reign: Drew Pain (196 days)
- Shortest reign: Stevie Riggs (<1 day); Morgus the Maniac (<1 day)

The Mid-Eastern Wrestling Federation (MEWF) Mid-Atlantic Heavyweight Championship was the second highest ranking singles title in the Mid-Eastern Wrestling Federation, one of three in the promotion.

The title was created when "Hollywood" Bob Starr defeated C.C. Danger at an event held in Gaithersburg, Maryland on March 6, 1993. In 2003, the title was merged with the MCW Rage Television Championship when Maryland Championship Wrestling held its final show as an interpromtional event with the Mid-Eastern Wrestling Federation creating the MEWF Unified Mid-Atlantic Heavyweight Championship.

The championship has been known as:

- MEWF Mid-Atlantic Heavyweight Championship (1993 – 2003)
- MEWF Unified Mid-Atlantic Heavyweight Championship (2003 – 2004)

There have been a total of 31 recognized champions who have had a combined 45 official reigns.

== Title history ==
Wrestler:	Times:	Date:	Location:	Notes:
"Hollywood" Bob Starr	1	March 6, 1993	Gaithersburg, MD	Defeated C.C. Danger to become the first champion.
Mike Khoury	1	November 14, 1993	Gaithersburg, MD	
Title history unrecorded		1992-1994		
Vacated		1992		
Joe Thunder	1	November 1994		
Ultimate Comet	1	November 12, 1994	Hampstead, MD	
Title history unrecorded		1994-1995		
Corporal Punishment	1			
Raven	1	April 23, 1995		
Chad Austin	1	October 1, 1995		
Corporal Punishment	2	November 12, 1995		
Vacated		1995		
Devon Storm	1	December 1995		Defeated Chad Austin for vacant title.
Vacated		February 15, 1996		
Corporal Punishment	3	February 25, 1996		Defeated Johnny Gunn to win vacant title.
Joe Thunder	2	June 2, 1996		
Knuckles Zanwich	1	June 22, 1996		
Boo Bradley	1	October 13, 1996		
"Wiseguy" Jimmy Cicero	1	December 1, 1996		
Quinn Nash	1	June 1, 1997		
Vacated		September 16, 1997		
Joey Maggs	1	September 17, 1997		Defeated Bob Starr to win vacant title.
Vacated		1998		
Adam Flash	1	November 14, 1998	Hampstead, MD	Defeated Ricky Blues to win vacant title.
Title history unrecorded		1998-1999		
Max Thrasher	1			
Steve Corino	1		Baltimore, MD	
The Cat Burglar	1		Baltimore, MD	
Chad Austin	2		Baltimore, MD	
"The Smoke" Smokey Myavia	1		Baltimore, MD	
"Mad Dog" Buzz Stryker	1		Baltimore, MD	
The Cat Burglar	2		Dundalk, MD	
Ruckus	1	November 13, 1999	Hampstead, MD	
Otto Schtark	1		Dundalk, MD	
Buzz Stryker	2	April 29, 2000	Middle River, MD	
Title history unrecorded		2000		
Max Thrasher	2	September 22, 2000	Dundalk, MD	Win title in 4 Way Dance with Morgus the Maniac, Buzz Stryker and Dino Casanova.
Dino Casanova	1	January 27, 2001		
Morgus the Maniac	1	March 17, 2001		
Jim Christian	1	April 12, 2001	Baltimore, MD	
Vacated		2001		Title becomes vacant when Jim Christian left the promotion.
Morgus The Maniac	2	2001		Defeated Dino Casanova to win the vacant title.
Stevie Riggs	1	May 24, 2001		
Morgus the Maniac	2	May 24, 2001		Regained title at same event.
Drew Pain	1	November 25, 2001	Dundalk, MD	Event held at the Teamsters Union Hall.
Bob Starr	2	June 9, 2002	Baltimore, MD	
Barry Horowitz	1	September 22, 2002	Baltimore, MD	Won title in a Three-Way Dance with Bob Starr and Hack Myers.
Bob Starr	3	October 27, 2002		
Morgus The Maniac	3	June 8, 2003	North Point, MD	
Bob Starr	4	June 8, 2003	North Point, MD	Regained title at same event.
Doug Delicious	1	July 16, 2003	Glen Burnie, MD	Title is unified with the MCW Rage Television Championship.
Vacated		September 7, 2003	North Point, MD	Doug Delicious is stripped of the championship when he fails to appear for a scheduled title defense.
Bob Starr	5	September 7, 2003	North Point, MD	Defeated Chad Bowman to win the vacant title.
Romeo Valentine	1	January 11, 2004	Dundalk, MD	Won title in a Triple Threat match with Bob Starr and Buzz Stryker.
Sean Patrick	1	February 8, 2004	North Point, MD	
Qenaan Creed	1	March 28, 2004	Dundalk, MD	
