= Bob Starr (wrestler) =

American professional wrestler (born 1971)

Personal information
- Born: Robert A. Starr; 24 September 1971 (age 55) Malibu Beach, California, United States
- Website: Official website

Professional wrestling career
- Ring name(s): Bob Starr; Bobby Starr; Doink; Russian Assassin
- Billed height: 6 ft 0 in (1.83 m)
- Billed weight: 238 lb (108 kg)
- Billed from: Hollywood, California; Baltimore, Maryland
- Trained by: Ricky Lawless
- Debut: September 18, 1988
- Retired: 2019

Robert A. "Bob" Starr (born September 24, 1971) is a semi-retired American professional wrestler, trainer, and manager who has competed in numerous independent promotions throughout the United States since his debut in 1988. He is especially well known in the Mid-Atlantic region where he has competed for The Bad Crew's Eastern Wrestling Federation, Eastern Championship Wrestling, Mid-Eastern Wrestling Federation, National Wrestling League, and the Virginia Wrestling Alliance. Starr also wrestled as a preliminary wrestler in both World Championship Wrestling and the World Wrestling Federation throughout the 1990s.

One of the most dominant wrestlers in the MEWF's history, Starr was among the original wrestlers who helped create the promotion, serving as its booker in later years, and was widely considered "the face" of the company; he is a two-time MEWF Heavyweight Champion, a record six-time MEWF Mid-Atlantic Champion, and three-time MEWF Tag Team Champion as one-half of the Hollywood Hunks with Lucifer and Joe Thunder. He is also the last official AWA World Television Champion and, as of 2010, was still defending the title on the "indy circuit" despite the close of AWA Superstars (Mike Schwabbs version) eight years before.

Starr, himself trained by Ricky Lawless and the Monster Factory, has worked as an instructor at both the Bone Busters and Brain Busters training facilities in Baltimore, and Gillberg's Pro Wrestling Academy in Severn, Maryland. He is credited for training, among others, Lucifer, Fantasia, and Ruckus. In recent years, he has been associated with Maryland Championship Wrestling as a referee and manager. In 2010, MCW's second annual "Legends of Maryland" supercard, he was inducted into the MCW Hall of Fame.

== Career ==
=== Early career (1988–1990) ===
Originally from Malibu Beach, California, Starr moved with his family to Baltimore where he would spend most of his childhood. Baltimore was a major wrestling town at this time with monthly visits from the "Big 3", the American Wrestling Association, the National Wrestling Alliance, and the World Wrestling Federation. It was during the mid-1980s, searching for cartoons to watch while snowed in at his home, that Starr came across a televised wrestling match of Paul Orndorff and Roddy Piper "[beating] the hell out of each other". He soon became an avid wrestling fan and, while attending Dundalk High School, began training to be a pro wrestler after meeting "Bad Boy" Ricky Lawless. He would be part of the same class that produced Axl Rotten and Joey Maggs.

When Lawless was murdered four months into his training, Starr continued at the Baltimore Monster Factory before making his professional debut in 1988. His first match took place on September 18 of that year against Tim Tyson at the Langley Air Force Base fieldhouse in Hampton, Virginia. He spent the next several years wrestling in several regional and independent promotions including All Star Wrestling, the Atlantic States Wrestling Alliance, Mario Savoldi's International Championship Wrestling, Universal Independent Wrestling, and the Virginia Wrestling Alliance. He wrestled one of his first major opponents, Axl Rotten, at the ASWA's "Wrestling Fury" supercard in 1990.

=== WWF and WCW (1990–1991) ===
In 1990, Starr joined the World Wrestling Federation making his debut with Bobby Knight in a tag team match against both The Executioners (Pain & Agony) and Legion of Doom (Hawk & Animal) at a television taping in Utica, New York. Starr had been brought into the promotion by Tony Garea, on the advice of fellow Maryland wrestler Duane Gill (Pain), and would continue to appear on WWF television and house shows up and down the East Coast and Northeastern United States during his first run in the promotion.

At the time he was working part-time at a used car dealership when Gill convinced him to quit his job to tour with the WWF. A year later, Starr took part in a 40-man battle royal including WWF Intercontinental Champion Bret Hart, Davey Boy Smith, Virgil, Kato, Owen Hart, Koko B. Ware, Tito Santana, Kerry von Erich, Tatanka, Sgt. Slaughter, Rick Martel, Berzerker, Skinner, Duane Gill, Jim Brunzell, Barry Horowitz, Jim Powers, Barry Hardy, Bob Knight, the Beverly Brothers, The Nasty Boys, and WWF World Tag Team Champions Money Inc. (Ted DiBiase & IRS); Starr was eliminated by one of the Beverly Brothers. It was held at the Civic Centre in Ottawa, Ontario and later aired on the July 6 edition of WWF Prime Time Wrestling.

In July 1991, Starr also made his debut in World Championship Wrestling against Nikita Koloff in Salisbury, Maryland. With the exception of occasional appearances in the WWF (his last tour was in 1994), he would continue wrestling for the company making over 250 television appearances and countless house shows for the next 6 years.

It was during this period that Starr worked as an independent agent, like many who worked as preliminary wrestlers, allowing him to continue wrestling anywhere he wished, such as his later commitments to the Mid-Eastern Wrestling Federation, as long as he was able to make his television appearances. In time, he would become a familiar face on WWF and WCW television programming, in addition to television shows run by independent promotions.

=== Mid-Eastern Wrestling Federation (1991–1994) ===
During the summer of 1991, Starr became involved in the creation of the Mid-Eastern Wrestling Federation, one of the earliest independent promotions in Maryland, along with co-founders Dennis Wippercht and Tim Burke. He wrestled Morgus the Maniac on its first card held in Pasadena, Maryland on August 2, 1991 He would remain one of the promotion's top stars for much of its 12-year history, considered the "face" of the company by the late-1990s, and later became involved in helping Burke run the promotion behind-the-scenes as a booker and in other roles.

On March 6, 1993, Starr defeated C.C. Danger in Gaithersburg, Maryland to become the first MEWF Mid-Atlantic Heavyweight Champion. He held the title for eight months before losing it to Mike Khoury in Essex on November 14, 1993; the title changed hands during an 8-man tag team elimination match pitting Bob Starr, Tommy Lee Manson, Max Thrasher, and Duane Gill against Mike Khoury, Joe Thunder, Tommy Dreamer, and Max Moon. As a result of a pre-match stipulation, Khoury, as the sole survivor, was awarded the MEWF Mid-Atlantic title.

On May 21, 1993, Starr teamed with Joey Maggs in a losing effort against the Cole Twins (Kent and Keith Cole) at the Philadelphia Civic Center. Though both Starr and Maggs were familiar stars in the region, WCW drew its lowest-ever crowd in the "hardcore mecca" of Philadelphia with only 600 fans in attendance. Nearly a year later he returned to Philadelphia to make a one-time appearance in Eastern Championship Wrestling, due in part to Axl Rotten, teaming with "The Extreme Shah" Hack Meyers in his ECW debut against The Bruise Brothers (Don and Ron Bruise) at the ECW Arena.

That same year, he also formed a successful tag team with Lucifer called The Hollywood Hunks. The team toured the Mid-Atlantic circuit capturing the ECWA Tag Team Championship in August 1993 which they held until dropping the belts to Ace Darling & Kid Flash two years later. In late September 1994, he made a brief return to the WWF teaming with Chris Canyon to take on Shawn Michaels & Diesel on the September 26th edition of Monday Night Raw. He followed this up with back-to-back appearances for WWF house shows in Upstate New York later aired on television. Starr wrestled in a tag team match with Barry Horowitz against The Headshrinkers (Fatu & Samu) at the Mid-Hudson Civic Center on September 27 and, in a singles match, against Adam Bomb at the Westchester County Center the following night. This was his last year touring for the company.

In November, he and Lucifer defeated The Goodfellows (Romeo Valentino & Dino Casanova) for the MEWF Tag Team Championship. Their MEWF tag title reign, however, lasted only a brief time as they were defeated by Road Warrior Hawk and Ultimate Comet in Catonsville days later. He also wrestled bouts against Mike Khoury and Doink the Clown during this time facing Doink and Dink in a mixed tag team match at the end of the year.

=== World Championship Wrestling (1991–1995) ===
Though Starr competed for both WCW and the WWF during the 1990s, because of its closer vicinity to Maryland and "open-door policy", he remained largely loyal to WCW and was featured on virtually all of its television programming with the exception of WCW Thunder. His initial attempts to be hired by the company, however, were ignored. He was later advised to contact Jody Hamilton at the Power Plant for bookings with the company. According to Starr, he left Hamilton a message every day "for at least two weeks" until he finally received a reply and was eventually allowed to wrestle for the promotion. One of his first matches for WCW was against Big Van Vader immediately following his losing the WCW World Heavyweight Championship to Ron Simmons in Baltimore. Vader, allegedly upset that he had lost the title, wrestled stiff in his match against Starr battering him so hard that he thought his "eardrums would burst".

In November 1992, Starr was recuperating from his ear injury at home when he received a call from then booker Dusty Rhodes. He had hung up the phone several times because he could not understand who was calling before realizing it was Rhodes contacting him for work in Atlanta. Starr took his girlfriend's car, driving without a license, and drove from Maryland to Atlanta where he wrestled Johnny B. Badd and Van Hammer on WCW Saturday Night and WCW Main Event respectively. It was on the former show, WCW Saturday Night, that he would become a mainstay during his 6-year run with the company. In the next three years alone, he would wrestle Ice Train, The Shockmaster, Marcus Bagwell, "Jungle" Jim Steele, Thunder and Lightning, The Guardian Angel, Randy Savage, Alex Wright, The Renegade, Kamala, Johnny B. Badd, Rockin' Rebel, Road Warrior Hawk, and Eddie Guerrero.

Though primarily used as a preliminary wrestler, there were several occasions in which he had a memorable role. On April 20, 1994, in his match against WCW International World Champion Sting at Atlanta's Center Stage Theatre, he was pinned in 36 seconds following a Stinger Splash. Afterward, in a rare show of sportsmanship, the champion helped Starr to his feet. Starr would also occasionally team with Ricky Santana, most notably, in matches against Brad & Scott Armstrong and The Nasty Boys later in the year. The following year, he and Scott D'Amore took on Big Van Vader in a handicap match.

Starr made notable appearances on other WCW programs such as WCW Worldwide and WCW Pro. On February 21, 1995, in a match later aired on WCW Pro, he and Dave Young wrestled Stars and Stripes (Marcus Alexander Bagwell & the Patriot) in front of 1,800 fans at the sold-out Georgia Mountains Center in Gainesville, Georgia. That summer, he also received title shots for the WCW World Television Championship; on May 3, 1995, he wrestled Arn Anderson at Disney-MGM Studios (WCW Worldwide) and The Renegade (WCW Pro) at the Macon Coliseum on June 26, 1995. Subsequent returns to WCW Pro between 1995 and 1997 saw Starr wrestle Jushin Thunder Liger, Scott Norton, and Chavo Guerrero Jr. He also appeared on the short-lived WCW Prime in matches against The Renegade, One Man Gang, The Shark, The Nasty Boys, and The Blue Bloods ("Lord" Steven Regal and "Earl" Robert Eaton).

=== Mid-Eastern Wrestling Federation (1996–1998) ===
Still a top contender in the MEWF, Starr wrestled stars such as Mad Dog O'Malley, "Superfly" Jimmy Snuka, Abuddah Singh, and Pat Patterson Jr. on MEWF's weekly television show in 1996. He also briefly formed a tag team with Cat Burglar, teaming up to take on Darkside (Glen Osbourne and Rockin' Rebel) in Baltimore on August 11, 1996, and feuded his old tag team partner Lucifer.

On February 1, 1997, following the death of Neil Superior, Starr wrestled John Rambo for the vacant NWL Heavyweight Championship but failed to win the title. In March, Starr wrestled both Raven and Hollywood Nova from Extreme Championship Wrestling as well as teaming with Julio Sanchez against Mark Shrader and Devon Storm on June 1, 1997. Four months later, he lost to Joey Maggs in a match for the vacant MEWF Mid-Atlantic Heavyweight Championship. Starr began teaming with Joe Thunder and together defeated Marvelous Inc. (Jimmy Jannetty and Ramblin Rich Myers) for the MEWF Tag Team Championship in Baltimore on September 18, 1998, but lost the titles a few weeks later to The Bad Crew (Bad Crew #1 & Bad Crew #2).

=== World Championship Wrestling and the Indy Circuit (1997–1999) ===
Starr, by now a regular on Monday Night Nitro, had faced several members of the New World Order such as Syxx and WCW World Tag Team Champions The Outsiders (Scott Hall & Kevin Nash) with partner David Moore. Prior to Hulk Hogan's heel turn at Bash at the Beach, Starr's nickname was changed by the promotion to "Playboy" so as to avoid confusion between the two.

In his last run with WCW, he was earning $500 a night and was one of several wrestlers who brought in "crews" of preliminary wrestlers along with David Sierra (Tampa) and Scott D'Amore (Ontario). D'Amore had initially been part of Starr's "crew" and later brought in his own group of wrestlers from his native Canada which included Edge and Rhyno. Though hoping for a full-time contract with World Championship Wrestling by the end of 1999, he would no longer wrestle in the company after this point. In the meantime, he had become an instructor at the Bone Busters Pro Wrestling School (and later the Brain Busters facility) in Baltimore and was involved in training Fantasia and Ruckus.

As of 1999, he had competed in over 75 independent promotions "all the way from Wisconsin to Indiana to California and back again" and wrestling an average of 6–10 shows a month. He also wrestled for Don McNeil Promotions in Wisconsin as well as smaller organizations in North Carolina, Pennsylvania, Virginia, and West Virginia. The most notable of these was AWA Superstars based in Minneapolis, working for different versions under Dale Gagner and Mike Schwabb, and was the last AWA World Television Champion before it closed in 2001. Starr was never paid by Schwabb and so retained ownership of the physical belt which he continued to defend at independent shows as late as 2010.

=== Mid-Eastern Wrestling Federation (1999–2004) ===
In 1998, Corporal Punishment and Mark Shrader left the MEWF due to creative control and salary disputes to form their own promotion, Maryland Championship Wrestling. Much of the roster jumped to the newly formed MCW, and which also received the ECW and independent stars formerly featured by the MEWF, leaving mostly students and longtime stars Starr and Morgus The Maniac. Starr also helped Tim Burke with the day-to-day running of the promotion, such as bringing in Tonya Stevens as a special guest announcer (her first break in pro wrestling), and was among several who served as a booker.

With few stars remaining in the MEWF, Starr and Morgus The Maniac kept the promotion going in the aftermath of the MEWF/MCW split. A few former WWF stars were brought in which saw Starr teaming with The Honky Tonk Man and wrestling George "The Animal" Steele. Starr won the MEWF Heavyweight Championship twice in 1999. He first defeated Morgus the Maniac for the title on February 7, and The Honky Tonk Man in Dundalk on November 13, 1999. His second and final reign lasted a little over four months before he was defeated by Patch on March 31, 2000. His title reign was not without some controversy, however, as it was alleged that some wrestlers felt he had used his position as booker to "[put] the MEWF Championship on himself for a period of several months, despite a locker room feeling he was out of shape and had become a caricature of himself".

Reforming the Hollywood Hunks with Lucifer, the team defeated then MEWF Tag Team Champions The Tokyo Terrors in Dundalk on September 22, 2000, and successfully defended the titles against both Freak Show and Tommy Hawk & Jimmy Jannetty in Martinsburg, West Virginia the following night. The title reign lasted over a year and ended after losing the belts to Rayne & Buzz Stryker on October 16, 2001. On June 9, 2002, he won the MEWF Mid-Atlantic Championship for the second time after defeating Drew Pain in Baltimore. Though losing the title to Barry Horowitz on September 22, in a three-way dance with Hack Meyers, at Baltimore's North Point Flea Market, he regained it from Horowitz a month later. On November 24, 2002, he and Max Thrasher lost to Chad Bowman and Dino Casanova in a match for the vacant MEWF tag team titles.

On June 8, 2003, at an MEWF event in Northpoint, Maryland, Starr lost the MEWF Mid-Atlantic title to his old rival Morgus The Maniac but was able to win it back later on in the show. A month later, he lost to MCW Television Champion Doug Delicious in a three-way title unification match, involving Marquis Jordan, at Michaels 8th Avenue in Glen Burnie on July 16. The title change occurred at an interpromotional event between the MEWF and long-time rival Maryland Championship Wrestling, the 5th annual Shane Shamrock Memorial Cup, serving as the latter's final show and attended by an estimated 1,000 fans.

Despite the loss, Starr was able to win back the title, which had become vacant, by defeating Chad Bowman in Northpoint on September 7, 2003. He lost the title to Romeo Valentine in Dundalk on January 11, 2004, in a Triple Threat match with Buzz Stryker, ending his fifth and final title reign.

His last appearance for the company was on March 28, 2004, at a house show held at Dundalk's Northpoint Flea Market where Starr teamed with Davey Boy Schitz against Chris Clow and a mystery partner which turned out to be Earl the Pearl, a match which Starr and Schitz lost. Also scheduled to be on the card was Reckless Youth, Danny Doring, Romeo Valentino, Chris Chetti, Chad Bowman, and The Bruiser.

In April, Starr sent out an e-mail to a number of people, including internet "dirt sheet" writers, declaring the promotion "dead". The letter was prompted by the sudden cancellation of the promotion's show earlier that month. MEWF founder Tim Burke denied this claiming "the MEWF was strong as ever", however, internal problems in the MEWF locker room had long been apparent since the split between MEWF and MCW as well as rumors of Burke's "personal issues" earlier in the year.

=== Independent circuit (2004–2005) ===
Following the close of the MEWF, Starr continued competing on the independent circuit. On August 14, 2004, he entered the second annual National Wrestling League / House of Pain Wrestling Federation's "Lord of the Rings" tournament in Newville, Pennsylvania. Though he seemingly pinned his opponent, Pirate of the Caribbean, after using a pair of brass knuckles referee Rob Lick reversed the decision after discovering the foreign object and the Pirate of the Caribbean ended up winning the match to advance to the semi-finals. In early-2005, Starr was one of several wrestlers signed to Dan Selsky's short-lived Maryland Wrestling Alliance. He appeared on its debut show, “Inaugural Bash”, on March 2, 2005, where he was pinned by Dino Devine. In October 2005, he suffered a serious knee injury with kept him out of action for four or five months.

=== Maryland Championship Wrestling (2006–2008) ===
In 2006, Starr joined MEWF's one-time rival Maryland Championship Wrestling, which had reopened that same year, serving as the promotion's senior referee. After being appointed by MCW Commissioner Jim Christian, he officiated a number of important events including Jason Static defeating Norman Smiley for the vacant MCW Rage Television Championship in November 2006. A year later Starr appeared at MCW's "Monster Mash" supercard on November 14, 2007, as the manager of The Headliners (Jimmy Jannetty & Ramblin Rich) which saw the team defeat The Best of Both Worlds (Doyle Day & Buck Chyld). At that year's "Holiday Homecoming", The Headliners attacked Ryan McBride & Teddy Stigma prior to their match against then MCW Tag Team Champions The Ghetto Mafia (2-Dope and Sydeswype) and took their place in the match. They were unable to win the championship, however, and all three men attacked special guest referee (and MEWF alumnus) Earl the Pearl who Starr blamed for the loss. The Headliners were then scheduled to face McBride and Stigma, with Earl the Pearl in their corner, at the 2008 MCW Anniversary Show in Dundalk, Maryland, on February 24, 2008. The winners were also to receive a title shot at the MCW Tag Team Champions.

=== Recent years (2009–) ===
Starr's employment in the Maryland Department of Corrections limited his ring schedule, wrestling mainly on the weekends, though he continued to make regular appearances on the independent circuit, primarily for NWL/HOPWF in Hagerstown and MCW in Baltimore. As of 2010, he had competed in an estimated 100 regional and independent promotions throughout the continental United States. In addition, he worked part-time as a concert photographer for Kenny Chesney, Brett Michaels, Mötley Crüe, and Sugarland when performing in the Baltimore area. In January 2010, Starr managed Brian Hardy, the son of Barry Hardy, in his match against Gillberg at ACW Destiny. He had previously managed Hardy in a match against Buddy Landell for ACW Wrestling and also worked as an instructor at Gillberg's Pro Wrestling Academy in Severn, Maryland.

On October 27, 2010, Starr was interviewed on the internet radio show False Count Radio in which he discussed his early career, including road stories while working for WCW and the WWF, and memories of the Monday Night War between the two organizations. He specifically talked about his thoughts on Eric Bichoff, defending his management of the organization, and the general atmosphere of the WCW locker room during this period. He also commented on his experiences wrestling for the WWF, the differences being employed by the WWF versus WWE, and the emphasis on modern "divas" at the expense of traditional female wrestlers. He was particularly critical of the inadequate training independent wrestlers received by unqualified wrestling schools in operation. Starr also revealed he had kept a modest collection of wrestling memorabilia throughout his 22-year career and possessed a 5,800 video library.

On October 30, at MCW's "Legends of Maryland 2" supercard, Starr teamed with "Mad Dog" Buzz Stryker against former student Ruckus and Cat Burglar. He was also inducted into the MCW Hall of Fame along with The Goodfellows (Rip Sawyer and Dino Casanova). A year later, he participated in an RF Video "Legends Q&A Session" in Baltimore with Terry Funk, Manny Fernandez, and Axl Rotten.

== Championships and accomplishments ==
- AWA Superstars
  - AWA World Television Championship (1 time, current)
- All Star Wrestling Federation
  - ASWF Television Championship (2 times)
- East Coast Wrestling Association
  - ECWA Tag Team Championship (1 time) – with Lucifer
- Maryland Championship Wrestling
  - MCW Hall of Fame (Class of 2010)
- Mid-Eastern Wrestling Federation
  - MEWF Heavyweight Championship (2 times)
  - MEWF Mid-Atlantic Championship (6 times, first)
  - MEWF Tag Team Championship (3 times) – with Lucifer (2) and Joe Thunder (1)
- Pro Wrestling Illustrated
  - PWI ranked him #454 of the top 500 singles wrestlers in the PWI 500 in 1998
- Virginia Wrestling Alliance
  - VWA Television Championship (1 time)
- Other titles
  - Global Television Championship (1 time)
