= Mike Khoury =

American professional wrestler

Personal information
- Born: Maryland City, Maryland, United States

Professional wrestling career
- Ring name(s): Michael Sweet; Mike Khoury
- Billed weight: 229 lb (104 kg)
- Billed from: Baltimore, Maryland
- Debut: c. 1992
- Retired: c. 1996

Mike Khoury is an American professional wrestler who competed in East Coast and Mid-Atlantic independent promotions during the early to mid-1990s. Though he is best remembered for his years in World Championship Wrestling and the World Wrestling Federation as a preliminary wrestler, he had a successful career in Cueball Carmichael's Independent Pro Wrestling Association and the Mid-Eastern Wrestling Federation. He is a former MEWF Mid-Atlantic Heavyweight Champion and MEWF Tag Team Champion as part of the original Models Inc. with Johnny Handsome.

== Career ==
Born in Maryland City, Maryland, Mike Khoury made his professional wrestling debut around 1992. The following year, he began wrestling as a preliminary wrestler for the World Wrestling Federation. His first WWF television appearance was on WWF Superstars where he wrestled Ludvig Borga in Utica, New York on August 14, 1993. Days later, he worked tag team matches with Dave Moraldo against The Headshrinkers (Fatu & Samu) on WWF Monday Night Raw at the Mid-Hudson Civic Center in Poughkeepsie and with Aaron Ferguson against The Quebecers (Jacques & Pierre) at the Westchester County Center in White Plains.

He also found success on the East Coast and Mid-Atlantic independent circuit working for promotions such as Tod Gordon's Eastern Championship Wrestling and the Mid-Eastern Wrestling Federation. On November 14, 1993, Khoury beat "Hollywood" Bob Starr in Gaithersburg, Maryland for the MEWF Mid-Atlantic Heavyweight Championship. According to a pre-match stipulation, Khoury won the title as the sole survivor of an 8-man elimination tag team match with Joe Thunder, Max Moon and Tommy Dreamer against Duane Gill, Max Thrasher, Tommy Lee Manson and Bob Starr at Kenwood High School in Essex, Maryland. On November 27, Khoury faced WWF Intercontinental Champion Razor Ramon on WWF Superstars in Delhi, New York and was pinned with Ramon's finishing move, the "Razor's Edge". Their match was held in front of a 2,500 sold-out crowd at Farrell Hall and later included in The History of Razor Ramon 8-disc DVD series. Two days later, Khoury and Reno Riggins lost to The Steiner Brothers (Rick & Scott Steiner) at the Westchester County Center when he was pinned by Scott Steiner.

On April 22, 1994, Khoury made his first appearance in World Championship Wrestling against Meng on WCW Saturday Night. Throughout 1994, he also was a regular on WWF Superstars and Monday Night RAW facing such opponents as Bastion Booger, Owen Hart, Bam Bam Bigelow, Henry Godwinn and King Kong Bundy. He also wrestled The Steiner Brothers with Barry Hardy and The Heavenly Bodies (Tom Prichard & Jimmy Del Ray) with John Paul. On December 8, 1994, Khoury made a return appearance in WCW teaming with Gary Jackson against The Stud Sable (Bunkhouse Buck & Dick Slater) at the Center Stage Theatre in Atlanta, Georgia. The match aired on WCW Saturday Night a month later.

On January 22, 1995, Khoury appeared on WWF Action Zone against Owen Hart in Tampa, Florida. Khoury also made several more appearances on WCW Saturday Night in early-1995. He wrestled in handicap matches with Alex Davis against Avalanche on January 28, and WCW United States Heavyweight Champion Big Van Vader with Rick Keller on February 28.

Back in the WWF, Khoury wrestled The British Bulldog, The 1-2-3 Kid, Duke "the Dumpster" Droese, Hunter Hearst Helmsley, Sid Vicious, Rad Radford and, with Bob Cook, against The Smoking Gunns (Billy Gunn & Bart Gunn) during the next six months. Meanwhile on the indy circuit, Khoury had formed a tag team, Models Inc., with Johnny Handsome under the names Michael Sweet and John Crystal respectively. On March 18, they appeared on WCW Saturday Night in a handicap match against Avalanche. Five days later, he and Handsome won the MEWF Tag Team Championship from Sweet N' Sour (Rob Knoxious and Johnny Graham). They also made several appearances in the WWF including a match against then WWF World Tag Team Champions Owen Hart and Yokozuna on July 15 Jacob & Eli Blu and Tekno Team 2000 in their WWF debut match on Monday Night Raw. On the June 3rd edition of WCW Saturday Night, he and Scott D'Amore lost to Harlem Heat (Booker T & Stevie Ray).

After losing the MEWF tag team titles to Joe Thunder & Mad Dog O'Malley on July 8, the Models Inc. split up and Khoury continued wrestling in WCW and the WWF. On July 10, he lost to Savio Vega on Monday Night Raw. On September 23, 1995, Khoury lost to Disco Inferno on WCW Saturday Night. He wrestled his final WWF match against The Sultan at the Bryce Jordan Center in State College, Pennsylvania on September 24, 1996. Though a mainstay of Cueball Carmichael's Independent Pro Wrestling Association and the Mid-Eastern Wrestling Federation, Khoury retired soon afterwards.

== Championships and accomplishments ==
- Mid-Eastern Wrestling Federation
  - MEWF Mid-Atlantic Championship (1 time)
  - MEWF Tag Team Championship - with Johnny Handsome
