= Corporal Punishment (wrestler) =

American professional wrestler

Personal information
- Born: Daniel McDevitt; October 19, 1973 (age 52) Catonsville, Maryland, United States
- Children: Payton McDevitt
- Website: Dan McDevitt on Myspace

Professional wrestling career
- Ring name(s): Dan McDevitt; Corporal Punishment; The Ultimate Comet; The Comet
- Billed height: 6 ft 3 in (1.91 m)
- Billed weight: 245 lb (111 kg)
- Billed from: Baltimore, Maryland
- Trained by: Axl Rotten; Ian Rotten
- Debut: November 14, 1993

Daniel McDevitt (born October 19, 1973), best known by his ring name Corporal Punishment, is a semi-retired American professional wrestler, trainer and promoter. His career spans over a decade working in numerous independent promotions throughout the United States including the American Wrestling Federation, Extreme Championship Wrestling, Cueball Carmichael's Independent Professional Wrestling Alliance, Doug Flex's International Pro Wrestling, Independent Superstars of Professional Wrestling, House of Pain Wrestling Federation / National Wrestling League, and the National Wrestling Alliance.

He was a well-known "heel" in the mid-to late 1990s, especially in the Mid-Atlantic region as a top star in the Mid-Eastern Wrestling Federation, and engaged in feuds with Johnny Gunn, Axl Rotten, Stevie Richards and Adam Flash on the East Coast. He occasionally appeared in the World Wrestling Federation, as both an in-ring character and preliminary wrestler, during the "Attitude Era".

In 1998, McDevitt and Mark "The Shark" Shrader, then owners of the "Bone Breakers Pro Wrestling Training Center" in Halethorpe, Maryland, left the MEWF to form Maryland Championship Wrestling starting a 5-year rivalry which would last until MCW's close in 2003. A graduate of the Baltimore Monster Factory, where he was trained by Axl and Ian Rotten, McDevitt's "Bone Breakers" students include WWE's Lita, Mickie James, Orlando Jordan and Florida Championship Wrestling star Calvin Raines.

McDevitt reopened MCW in 2006 where he resumed his long-running feud with Adam Flash, and later, Zachary Shane. It was the latter feud which revolved around the real-life affair between Shane and McDevitt's now ex-wife Kim McDevitt. He gradually cut back his in-ring activity after 2008 but has continued to make on-camera appearances as MCW's owner.

In recent years, he has become involved in more "behind-the-scenes" positions within the industry. In 2011, he was hired by the Urban Wrestling Federation as an agent and associate producer for its debut pay-per-view event. That same year, he also accepted a position as a guest columnist for the South Carolina newspaper Lexington Patch where he maintains a professional wrestling blog. Outside of pro wrestling, McDevitt maintains a successful career as a Baltimore-area real estate agent.

== Career ==
=== Mid-Eastern Wrestling Federation (1993–1996) ===
Dan McDevitt was born and raised in Catonsville, Maryland. A wrestling fan since age 10, he decided to become a professional wrestler after graduating high school. He was trained by Axl and Ian Rotten at the Baltimore Monster Factory and made his pro debut on November 14, 1993. Within a year, he was wrestling full-time for Mid-Eastern Wrestling Federation under the name "The Comet" (and later "The Ultimate Comet"). On May 11, 1994, in his hometown of Catonsville, McDevitt teamed with Road Warrior Hawk to win the MEWF Tag Team Championship from The Hollywood Hunks (Lucifer and "Hollywood" Bob Starr). The following night, he defeated Joe Thunder for the MEWF Mid-Atlantic Heavyweight Championship in Hampstead, Maryland. It was around this time that he began wrestling as "Corporal Punishment" and won the MEWF Heavyweight Championship from Mad Dog O'Malley in Baltimore on March 26, 1995; he won the title after O'Malley had put out an open challenge to the MEWF locker room. It was also during the year that branched out to other promotions in the region. In 1995 alone, he wrestled Morgus the Maniac in the National Wrestling League, the Cuban Assassin in NWA New Jersey, and Doink the Clown (portrayed by Gino Caruso) at a National Wrestling Alliance show for Dennis Coraluzzo at the Rutgers Campus.

McDevitt held both titles for over a month before dropping the Mid-Atlantic belt to Raven, helped by his valet Isis, in Essex on April 23. He eventually gained his revenge for the loss by interfering in a title defense between Raven and Chad Austin on October 1, 1995, costing Raven to lose the belt; He regained the Mid-Atlantic title from Austin, beating him for the championship a month later, before the title was vacated. McDevitt lost the heavyweight championship to Jim "The Anvil" Neidhart at that same event, however, he won it back from Neidhart in Catonsville on November 10, 1995. His loss to Joe Thunder less than a month later ended his second title reign. He had one more final run as MEWF Mid-Atlantic Champion after defeating Johnny Gunn for the vacant title on February 26, 1996; he and Gunn feuded in other East Coast promotions during this time such as Wild Organization of Wrestling in Martinsburg, West Virginia. He successfully defended the title against Ricky Blues, among others, and in a three-way dance involving Axl Rotten and Johnny Gunn before losing the title to Joe Thunder in Baltimore on June 2. His third and final reign as MEWF Heavyweight Champion lasted less than a day following his victory of Johnny Gunn in Essex on June 30, 1996, losing the belt immediately after to Axl Rotten in a steel cage match. The title initially switched hands in a tag team match pitting himself and Rotten against Johnny Gunn and Joe Thunder. McDevitt was then challenged by his tag team partner who defeated him for the title.

Over the summer, McDevitt formed a tag team with Axl Rotten and together defeated Darkside (Glen Osbourne & Rockin' Rebel) in Catonsville on August 16. He lost the titles while teaming with Headbanger Mosh, who was substituting for Rotten, against Menace 2 Society (Adam Flash and Nick Tarantino) in Baltimore on September 13, 1996. McDevitt would both feud and team with his former trainer throughout his career.

=== Extreme Championship Wrestling (1997) ===
In early-1997, McDevitt began wrestling for Philadelphia's Extreme Championship Wrestling. He made his debut for the promotion wrestling Spike Dudley in back-to-back appearances in Hamburg and Downingtown, Pennsylvania, from February 8–9, 1997. On March 1, at an ECW house show held in Scranton, McDevitt wrestled Sabu at the Catholic Youth Center in front of 1,590 fans. The following night, this time for an MEWF event, he faced Big Stevie Cool of The Blue World Order in Baltimore. He similarly faced Chris Candido in his home promotion several days later and, a few years afterwards met Candido again in Doug Flex's International Pro Wrestling.

Over the next few months, he would appear on ECW Hardcore TV and numerous live events against ECW stars such as Pitbull #2, Balls Mahoney, Taz, and Tommy Dreamer, He also both wrestled and teamed with his one-time rival Axl Rotten facing then NWA United States Tag Team Champions The Lost Boys (Yar and Wolf) and The Gangstas (New Jack & Mustafa) that spring.

=== Mid-Eastern Wrestling Federation (1997–1998) ===
McDevitt continued to face ECW stars even after his eventual return to the MEWF. In March 1997, Miss Patricia became McDevitt's manager. On June 1, 1997, he wrestled a four-way match in Dundalk, Maryland, against Axl Rotten, New Jack, and The Sandman. He soon began tagging with Mark "The Shark" Shrader and, on July 17, 1997, they defeated MEWF Tag Team Champions The Wiseguys (Steve Corino and Jimmy Cicero) for the titles but lost them back to The Wiseguys the next month. The team made one more attempt to recapture the tag team titles, in a three-way dance with the champions on October 23, 1997, but both teams ended up losing to the Badstreet Boys (Joey Matthews and Christian York). Weeks later, McDevitt wrestled Salvatore Sincere for the vacant MEWF Heavyweight Championship in Keyser, West Virginia, but failed to defeat the WWF superstar; the match was not billed as a heavyweight title bout.

By the late-1990s, McDevitt had established himself as a "rough and tough rulebreaker" on East Coast independents, and later, throughout the continental United States. His in-ring persona, as the facepaint-clad "Corporal Punishment", was portrayed as having "little regard for warnings, fines, or possible suspensions" and, in fact, was "threatened" with being banned from several promotions. Among the different organizations he competed for included Cueball Carmichael's Independent Professional Wrestling Alliance where, in early 1998, he wrestled Adam Flash in Alexandria, Virginia. He would return to the IPWA the following year, facing Tom Brandi in Chincoteague Island, Virginia, for the vacant IPWA Heavyweight Championship, as well as making an appearance for Tommy Fierro's Independent Superstars of Professional Wrestling He would also feud with another "Corporal Punishment" while in Doug Flex's International Pro Wrestling. McDevitt was among the top independent wrestlers later featured on Smart Mark Video's "The Indies" Best of 1997–2000.

=== Maryland Championship Wrestling (1998–2003) ===
In the spring of 1998, McDevitt and then partner Mark Shrader decided to leave the MEWF following unresolved creative control and salary disagreements with the promotion's management. He and Shrader had started their own wrestling school, the "Bone Breakers Pro Wrestling Training Center" in Halethorpe, Maryland, the previous year and, with the encouragement of other indy wrestlers, decided open Maryland Championship Wrestling as an extension of the "Bone Breakers" facility. Among its most prominent students were Orlando Jordan and Florida Championship Wrestling star Calvin Raines; WWE's Mickie James and Lita would also train at the facility.

Over half the active MEWF roster jumped to their new promotion, including its then booker Axl Rotten, and, on July 19, 1998, MCW's first show was held at Baltimore's Patapsco Arena and attended by nearly 1,200 fans. The event featured manager Jim Cornette, Little Guido, Balls Mahoney, Jerry Lynn, Crowbar, and The Headbangers. The show's success and broke the longstanding monopoly over Maryland pro wrestling by the MEWF and would eventually lead to MCW becoming the top promotion in the region.

As "Corporal Punishment", McDevitt was involved in two major events in the promotion's history. On August 16, he and Axl Rotten joined The Headbangers (Mosh & Thrasher) in an 8-man tag team match against Jimmy Cicero, Julio Sanchez and The Pitbulls (Pitbull #1 and Pitbull #2) to crown the first MCW Tag Team Champions, which The Headbangers won. Two months later, he entered a championship tournament for the MCW Heavyweight Championship and advanced to the finals where he lost to Romeo Valentino. Near the end of the year, while competing for Unified Championship Wrestling in Alabama and Louisiana, he beat Stevie Richards for the promotion's heavyweight title in Bayou La Batre, Alabama. This would set off a short-lived but intense feud between the two men which would continue in MCW.

McDevitt and Shrader used their connections to continue bringing in then current stars from World Championship Wrestling and the World Wrestling Federation, such as McDevitt's long-time friendship with Cornette, as well as ECW talent, via Axl Rotten, which had formerly appeared for the MEWF. Over the next year, veterans such as Ricky Steamboat, Ricky Morton, Bobby Eaton, Tito Santana, The Iron Sheik, Sherri Martel, The Road Warriors, King Kong Bundy, and Jerry "The King" Lawler appeared on MCW shows. One of their most successful shows, however, was headlined by TV celebrity Steve Wilkos of the Jerry Springer Show set a new attendance record for MCW's home arena, Michael's Eighth Avenue ballroom, with nearly 2,000 fans. MCW would go on to produce over 100 events featuring some of the top independent wrestlers in the country during the next five years.

By 1999, he had switched from a primarily singles competitor to a tag team wrestler. During the year, he would form notable teams with Terry Funk, The Iron Sheik, Axl Rotten, and the Headbangers. The running of MCW, particularly during its first few years, took up much of McDevitt's time and saw far less of him as an active wrestler. Despite this, he was voted "Most Hated Wrestler of the Year" by its fans that year. On July 19, 2000, he entered the 2nd annual Shane Shamrock Memorial Cup but was eliminated by Chip Bowman in the opening rounds. In October 2000, McDevitt appeared before the Maryland State Athletic Commission, then attempting to shut down backyard wrestling in the state, claimed to be aware of "at least 20 unsanctioned backyard-type federations statewide".

On July 18, 2001, at MCW's 3rd annual Shane Shamrock Memorial Cup, McDevitt joined Jimmy Cicero and Kelly Bell in a 6-man tag team match against Brian Christopher, Adam Flash, and The Bruiser. He later faced The Bruiser in an "I Quit" match at the Ft. Meade Army Base on September 15, 2001. A later meeting between the two was featured by RF Video's "Best of the Bloody Indy Matches, Vol. 1".

When MEWF veteran Dave Casanova died following a heart attack on March 1, 2002, then MEWF promoter Donna Burke began organizing a memorial show in his honor. Out of friendship for their late friend, McDevitt and Shrader agreed to the MCW's participation as an interpromotional event. The Casanova memorial show marked was the first time that wrestlers from either promotion appeared in the same ring together since the 1997 split. It was around this time that former "Bone Breakers" student Derek Wayne began heavily investing in the MEWF and became a third co-owner. Wayne was able to broker a deal between McDevitt and MEWF owner Tim Burke to begin working together. Starting in October 2002, a storyline invasion took place between the two companies for the next seven months. It received a somewhat mixed reaction from fans and was brought to an end with MCW's close the following summer. The promotion held its final show, "The Last Dance: Shane Shamrock Memorial Cup", on July 16, 2003, at Michael's Eighth Avenue ballroom, in which over 1,000 fans were in attendance. At the event, it was announced that MCW would be "merging" the MEWF. He and Jeff Jones subsequently served as bookers for the promotion, however, McDevitt left after only a few months. On October 16, 2003, shortly after MCW's close, McDevitt appeared for Ring of Honor's debut show at Michael's Eighth Avenue where he endorsed the promotion and announced ROH would continue holding MCW's Shane Shamrock Memorial Cup.

=== Independent circuit and semi-retirement (2003–2006) ===
Following the close of MCW, McDevitt decided to limit his involvement in pro wrestling to concentrate on starting his career as a real estate agent. His decision was partially motivated by his then recent engagement to Kimerly, better known as MCW valet "Candie". He did, however, continue to hold occasional events at Fort Meade under the "Fort Meade Wrestling" banner. It was at one of these events, in October 2005, that McDevitt had Adam Flash removed from the facility by military police. McDevitt would often use this venue during the MCW years as the Maryland State Athletic Commission, which issued heavy fines for hardcore wrestling, had no jurisdiction on federal property.

In April 2005, after a three-year engagement, McDevitt and Payne were married at the old MCW Arena, Michael's Eighth Avenue, in Glen Burnie, Maryland. It was a wrestling-themed wedding with the ceremony taking place inside of a wrestling ring and the priest dressed as a referee. The wedding gained particular notoriety for the appearance of The Iron Sheik, who was among the many wrestling personalities in attendance, by causing a disruption during the Best man's speech to the couple. McDevitt described the incident years later in an interview with Christopher Porter of ExpressNightOut.com:

I got married in 2005 and, for whatever reason, I made the absolutely horrible mistake of inviting The Iron Sheik to my wedding. And if you've seen the stuff on YouTube or the stuff on Howard Stern, that's really him – he's a freakin' maniac.

Here's the thing: a big part of my family is Jewish. I have family members who married and converted [to Judaism]. So, my fiancee at the time wasn't really comfortable with [Sheik coming to the wedding] because she knows how the Sheik is and she's seen the videos of him. And I had a lot of people in wrestling [at the wedding], and I guess I was thinking more about entertaining them and having a good time than I was thinking what was a good decision.

She said, 'Whatever you do, don't let him get on the microphone.' So, I tell my best man – and he's a huge wrestling fan growing up – 'Joe, man, don't do it – don't put the Sheik on the microphone.' So, as he's giving his best-man speech, [wrestler] Stevie Richards – who's one of my closest friends but a helluva instigator … I see Stevie has Sheik by the arm and he's walking him up to my best man with the microphone, and I'm like, 'Oh, man. What's going on?'

My wife's side of the family knows nothing about wrestling, they're not into wrestling – so they're very much normal. And the Sheik gets up there and says I'm one of his closest friends and what a great person I am and he loves me so much – "Danny McDermitt." So, he calls me by the wrong name – and I think, 'Oh, this is going to be good.'

So, he's drunk, and he says, 'I just want to say to everybody, I have so much respect for Danny because he didn't kill the Jews like Hitler. And he's not like Saddam Hussein. And he's not a no good son-of-a-bitch like Osama bin Laden.' And I'm sitting there thinking, 'Man, to make me sound like a good guy, did you have to compare me to the three worst dictators in the world?'

Meanwhile, my side of the place – the wrestling [side] – is going crazy, screaming and yelling. And my wife's side of the family is absolutely horrified. Then Stevie comes running and pulls out a 'Hulkamania' sign and [Sheik] goes into a tangent about – [the usual one] you've heard on YouTube.

Everybody on my side of the family is in tears; my wife's side of the family is getting up and leaving, walking out of the hall. It was kind of just downhill from there – 10 months later I was divorced.

I honestly don't think [the marriage] ever recovered after that. … It was a freakin' disaster.

He put the Camel Clutch on my marriage.

McDevitt later discussed this event in a "Q&A" session with the Sheik and other MCW wrestlers at the 2008 Shane Shamrock Cup. He was also active in the internet wrestling community giving his support to OnlineWorldofWrestling.com and later published an article for Pro Wrestling Insider (and Pro Wrestling Between The Sheets) in which he criticized several "egotistical" wrestlers during his years promoting MCW.

=== Maryland Championship Wrestling (2006–2009) ===
After a two-year absence, McDevitt publicly announced his decision to reopen Maryland Championship Wrestling. MCW's return show, "The Resurrection", took place on February 26, 2006, at the "new" MCW Arena at Northpoint in Dundalk, Maryland. McDevitt did not wrestle on the card but instead appeared as himself in the role of MCW's owner and formerly introduced Tara as the new MCW Commissioner.

==== Return of Cpl. Punishment ====
Within a month, however, McDevitt would return to the ring in a long-running feud between himself and Adam Flash. It began at MCW's second show when a "fan" jumped the guardrail while McDevitt was informing the audience of the promotion's upcoming shows. This fan was later revealed to be Flash and was escorted from the building by security while McDevitt had to be carried to the back. Their confrontations referenced alleged real-life animosity between the two in what was essentially a "worked shoot". Flash returned to MCW at Shamrock Cup VI and provoked McDevitt into a fight after attacking his then wife Kim McDevitt. The brawl ended up having the entire MCW locker room enter the ring to pull the two men apart and was eventually stopped by the State Athletic Commission for excessive violence. Flash defeated Julio Dinero later on in the event and used a loophole in the pre-match stipulation to win the MEWF Heavyweight Championship.

On July 22, the two finally met at MCW's "Red, White, Black & Bruised" in a "fans bring the weapons" street fight at the Fort Meade Pavilion. While TNA's Sonjay Dutt, Monty Brown and Christian Cage were billed as the main attractions, the match between McDevitt and Flash was considered the highlight of the show with all "the blood & violence that wrestling in Fort Meade Pavilion can provide". Their match include the use of a miniature beer keg as well as thumbtacks, barbed wirfe and a flaming table. The MEWF Heavyweight Championship was also on the line, however, outside interference from D. J. Hyde & JD Michaels would cause him to lose the match.

On September 10, McDevitt wrestled Hyde and Michaels in a grudge match at MCW's "Tribute to the Legends". He was originally scheduled to have a mystery partner, however, this was changed to t 6-man tag team match with Headbanger Mosh and Orlando Jordan versus Bad Boy Luke, D. J. Hyde, and J. D. Michaels. McDevitt continued his feud with Flash facing him in tag team match with Christian York at "Monster Mash" on October 29, 2006, and The Dudley Boyz a month later.

==== Feud with Kim McDevitt and Zachary Shane ====
During the first few months of MCW's revival, Dan and Kim McDevitt began to experience trouble in their marriage, amid rumors of an extramarital affair with a fellow wrestler, with the two separating during the summer of 2006 and ultimately divorcing after only 10 months as a married couple. McDevitt later released a lengthy "shoot" video on YouTube discussing the circumstances of his divorce and Kim's confession to an affair with Zachary Shane. Both Kim and Shane would subsequently leave the promotion. McDevitt also withdrew from the day-to-day running of the company for a time.

It was during this period that the "heel" stable Creative Control (Tom Brandi, The Bruiser, and Jimmy Cicero) gained a degree of creative control over the promotion, its leader Tom Brandi being allowed to dictate his own matches, would often be a source of trouble for the MCW promoter. At "Aggravated Assault", on April 21, 2007, McDevitt ordered Adam Flash to defend his title against Test due to Creative Control's interference at an MCW show a month earlier. On the May 7 "Xtreme Measures II" supercard, Creative Control continually disrupted the show. They overturned Danny Doring's title victory over Adam Flash and introduced McDevitt's ex-wife Kim Payne and Zachary Shane in their official return to MCW. Their appearance caused McDevitt to "leave the building in disgust".

That spring, McDevitt also made an appearance as "Corporal Punishment" at a fundraiser for the American Wrestling Federation in Plymouth Meeting, Pennsylvania. He and his manager Judd The Stud "stole" the fundraiser money earlier in the show but were forced to return the donations after wrestling WWF legend King Kong Bundy. Corporal Punishment also appeared for a National Wrestling League show at South Hagerstown High School where he wrestled former amateur wrestler "Cocky" Rocky DiCola in his first professional wrestling match. DiCola scored a pinfall over the veteran wrestler after DiCola's high school wrestling coach Ralph Stottlemyer slammed a briefcase over McDervitt's head.

Back in MCW, McDevitt reappeared at the 2007 Shane Shamrock Cup where he led a tribute to the late Shane Shamrock prior to the main event. Earlier, when Joey Matthews was attacked by Creative Control prior to his match against Adam Flash, McDevitt brought in Danny Doring as a replacement; after Doring's defeat, Matthews returned to defeat Flash for the title. His feud between Kim McDevitt and Zachary Shane continued for almost the entire year as the two always managing to escape defeat with the help of Creative Control. He and Shane finally met at MCW "Holiday Homecoming", on December 26, 2007, in an 8th Avenue Street Fight. The venue was where Dan and Kim McDevitt were originally married less than three years ago.

==== Alliance with Adam Flash ====
Another confrontation with Creative Control on April 5, 2008, at "MCW Breaking Balls & Besting Heads". A match between Adam Flash and Christian York, initially ending in a disqualification, turned into a 10-man brawl involving McDevitt and several others who came to help Flash, who has since left Creative Control, against his former stablemates. Sabu was also scheduled to headline the card, however, McDevitt claimed that the former ECW star was "having problems with his personal demons".

McDevitt spent the rest of 2008 teaming with former enemy Adam Flash. MCW's "Xtreme Measures III" saw the two in an 8-man tag team match with Danny Doring and Balls Mahoney against The Bruiser, Zachary Shane, and the Badstreet Boys (Joey Matthews and Christian York). This was originally to be an intergender tag team match with Tom Brandi and Kim McDevitt but it was later cancelled. On July 19, 2008, he and Adam Flash wrestled The Ghetto Mafia (2-Dope and Sydeswype) on the second night of the 8th annual Shane Shamrock Memorial Cup. McDevitt participated in a "Q&A" session at the event with several MCW alumni, including Zachary Shane, and The Iron Sheik where he discussed the incident caused by the Sheik at his wedding. His last major appearance as "Corporal Punishment" was at MCW's "Summer Heat" supercard where he teamed with Adam Flash and Kevin Nash against The Bruiser and The Ghetto Mafia on April 23, 2008. McDevitt later claimed that he "couldn't walk right for a week" following the match.

A year later, McDevitt was interviewed by ExpressNightOut.com briefly discussing his early career, his divorce with Kim Payne, experiences as an independent wrestling promoter, and his personal life as a real estate agent. It was also during that interview, while promoting MCW's upcoming anniversary show, that he confirmed that was no longer an active wrestler due to nagging injuries suffered during his career.

=== Recent years (2009–present) ===
Since 2009, McDevitt has mainly been involved with MCW as a full-time promoter though he continues to make on-camera appearances as MCW's co-owner. He has also been employed in executive positions within the wrestling industry. In 2011, he was hired by the Urban Wrestling Federation as an agent and associate producer for its debut pay-per-view event.

== Championships and accomplishments ==
- House of Pain Wrestling Federation / National Wrestling League
  - NWL Heavyweight Championship (1 time)
- Maryland Championship Wrestling
  - Most Hated Wrestler of the Year (2000)
- Mid-Eastern Wrestling Federation
  - MEWF Heavyweight Championship (3 times)
  - MEWF Mid-Atlantic Championship (2 times, first)
  - MEWF Tag Team Championship (3 times) – with Road Warrior Hawk, Axl Rotten and Mark Shrader
- Pro Wrestling Illustrated
  - PWI ranked him #272 of the top 500 singles wrestlers in the PWI 500 in 1999
- Unified Championship Wrestling
  - UCW Heavyweight Championship (1 time)
