= Barry Hardy =

American professional wrestler (born 1962)

Personal information
- Born: Barry W. Hardy; July 5, 1962 (age 64) Richmond, Virginia, U.S.

Professional wrestling career
- Ring name(s): Agony; Barry Hardy; Executioner #2; Terry Turtle
- Billed height: 6 ft 1 in (185 cm)
- Billed weight: 230 lb (104 kg)
- Billed from: Tarrytown, Texas (as Terry Turtle)
- Trained by: Larry Sharpe; Charlie Fulton
- Debut: 1987
- Retired: 2017

Barry W. Hardy (born July 5, 1962) is an American professional wrestler and trainer who has competed in North American independent promotions since 1987, including East Coast Wrestling, Mid-Eastern Wrestling Federation, the National Wrestling Alliance, New Millennium Wrestling and Larry Sharpe's World Wrestling Association.

Hardy also had stints in Extreme Championship Wrestling, World Championship Wrestling and the World Wrestling Federation, most notably as one half of "The Lords of Darkness" and the second incarnation of The Executioners with Duane Gill from 1990 to 1995.

== Professional wrestling career ==
=== Early career; World Wrestling Federation (1987–1989) ===
Born in Richmond, Virginia, Hardy eventually contacted Larry Sharpe and tried out at Sharpe's Monster Factory wrestling school. Training under Charlie Fulton for a year, he eventually made his professional debut in 1987. On February 15, he also made his WWF debut appearing on WWF Superstars with Barry Horowitz against WWF World Tag Team Champions Demolition (Ax and Smash) at the Broome County Arena in Binghamton, New York. He would appear three more times teaming with Sonny Austin against The Bushwhackers (Bushwhacker Butch and Bushwhacker Luke) in Rochester and losing to Ultimate Warrior in Niagara Falls, New York on June 27 and Jake "The Snake" Roberts in Wheeling, West Virginia on October 2, 1989. On October 3, he and Alan Reynolds lost to The Rockers at the Toledo Sports Arena in Toledo, Ohio.

=== Lords of Darkness (1990–1993) ===
Meanwhile, on the independent circuit, Hardy teamed with Duane Gill as The Lords of Darkness and were managed by "Pretty Boy" Larry Sharpe and competed in Mid-Atlantic independent promotions eventually winning the tag team titles in Atlantic States Wrestling Alliance and Sharpe's World Wrestling Association several times between 1990 and 1992. The two would also start the Baltimore Monster Factory. Hack Myers met Axl Rotten while at the wrestling school and, introducing him to promoter Paul Heyman, eventually brought him into Extreme Championship Wrestling.

They also began appearing on WWF television, although used as preliminary wrestlers, he and Gill had matches on WWF Primetime Wrestling against The Legion of Doom (Hawk and Animal), The Orient Express, The Rockers (Marty Jannetty and Shawn Michaels) and "Hacksaw" Jim Duggan and Sgt. Slaughter between 1990 and late 1991. On June 5, 1990, he and Gill faced WWF Tag Team Champions Demolition at the War Memorial Auditorium in Rochester, New York. They also faced Rhythm and Blues (The Honky Tonk Man and Greg Valentine) in Hershey, Pennsylvania on August 28. As well as teaming with Gill, Hardy occasionally teamed with different partners such as with Paul Perez against WWF World Tag Team Champions The Hart Foundation (Bret Hart and Jim Neidhart) and with Ross Lindsay against Power and Glory (Hercules and Paul Roma). Hardy also faced a young Shane Douglas at the Onondaga War Memorial in Syracuse, New York on December 23, 1990.

The following year, Hardy and Gill defeated Cream Team (Dino Casanova and Rip Sawyer) to become the first MEWF Tag Team Champions on August 2, 1991. In the WWF that year, he also wrestled "Texas Tornado" Kerry Von Erich, Big Bully Busick and Million Dollar Champion Virgil.

In March 1992, Hardy appeared at a "Live" St. Patrick's Day special for MCW Wrestling where he and Denny Kass defeated The Nightmares (Danny Davis and Ken Wayne). He also faced "Dirty" Dan Kanareck in a singles match and was pinned after using a neckbreaker. Held at the Continental Cable studios in Madison Heights, Michigan, these matches were later aired on the promotion's weekly television show.

During mid-1992, he faced Bret Hart, Crush, Bob Backlund and Lance Cassidy. During his matches with Backlund and Cassidy, Doink the Clown played practical jokes on his opponents after the match setting up Backlund to slip on a banana peel and putting a "kick me" sign on Cassidy's ring jacket. When Cassidy put the jacket back on after the match, Doink kicked him. Hardy later appeared in single matches against Tatanka and "British Bulldog" Davey Boy Smith on WWF Superstars and teamed with Kato of the Orient Express losing to The Bushwhackers on May 5, 1992.

He and Gill also participated in two of three 40-man battle royals held that year. The first, on June 2, included Money Inc. (Ted DiBiase and IRS), The Nasty Boys (Brian Knobs and Jerry Sags), The Beverly Brothers (Beau and Blake Beverly) and High Energy (Koko B. Ware and Owen Hart) as well as Sgt. Slaughter, Bret Hart, British Bulldog, Virgil, Tito Santana, Rick Martel, "The Texas Tornado" Kerry Von Erich, Skinner, Repo Man, Jim Powers, Jim Brunzell, Glenn Ruth, Phil Apollo, Barry Horowitz, Bobby Star, Dublin Destroyer (Brian Donahue), Rick Johnson, Al Hunter, Bob Knight, Rick Danger, Jerry Davis, Scott Antonio, Tony Ulysses, Bruce Mitchell, Joe Milano and several others. Which was won by The Berzerker in Ottawa, Ontario, Canada. The battle royal was later featured on WWF Rampage '92.

The second battle royal took place two months later. He and Gill (as The Executioners) took part in a 40-man battle royal won by Tatanka and which included Tito Santana, Bret Hart, Sgt. Slaughter, Col. Mustafa, Shawn Michaels, Crush, Kerry Von Erich, Virgil, Skinner, Repo Man, Barry Horowitz, Jim Powers, Brooklyn Brawler, Reno Riggins, Dale Wolfe, Brian Costello, Chuck Casey, Dom Jones, Burt Spears, Thor Anderson, Tom Cumberland, Mark Kordis, Legion of Doom, Money Inc. (Ted DiBiase and IRS), The Beverly Brothers (Beau and Blake Beverly), The Nasty Boys (Brian Knobs and Jerry Sags), High Energy (Koko B. Ware and Owen Hart) and The Natural Disasters (Earthquake and Typhoon). The battle royal was the first and largest held in WWF history and was later profiled in WWF Magazine. These were considered the largest battle royals held at a professional wrestling event until the introduction of the annual three ring 60-man battle royal at World War III three years later. He made his last WWF appearances on WWF Primetime losing to Davey Boy Smith on September 28 and Bret Hart on October 5, 1992.

On January 23, 1993, Hardy and Gill lost the WWA Tag Team titles to ECW Tag Team Champions The Super Destroyers in an interpromotional event between the World Wrestling Alliance and Eastern Championship Wrestling at the Radisson Hotel in Philadelphia, Pennsylvania, they briefly regained the titles before losing them to Chris Candido and Chris Evans and left for the WWF shortly after.

=== The Executioners (1991–1994) ===
He and Gill would begin wrestling in the World Wrestling Federation as The Executioners in early 1993. On March 9, only three days after losing their tag team titles, he and Gill also made an appearance as Toxic Turtles at the sold-out Augusta Civic Center with 8,000 in attendance. Their match was later taped for WWF Challenge. In singles matches, Hardy faced Tito Santana in his last WWF television appearance and was pinned by Santana in Wilkes Barre, Pennsylvania on July 6, 1993. He wrestled against Tatanka, Jim Duggan, Virgil, Mr. Perfect, and Razor Ramon as well as teaming with Reno Riggins, the Brooklyn Brawler, Bert Centeno and Barry Horowitz.

Appearing on Monday Night Raw throughout the year, he and Gill would face The Steiner Brothers (Rick and Scott Steiner), The Quebecers (Jacques and Pierre) and Men on a Mission (Mo and Mabel). They had previously faced Men on a Mission in their WWF debut on WWF Challenge several months before splitting up with Gill in 1995. Prior to their breakup, they also faced The Rock 'n' Roll Express (Ricky Morton and Robert Gibson) in a non-sanctioned match for the SMW Tag Team Championship at a special co-promotional event hosted by the WWF. Hardy himself soon left the WWF after losing to The Steiner Brothers in a tag team match with Mike Khoury on April 18, 1994.

=== World Wrestling Federation and World Championship Wrestling (1995) ===
Hardy returned to the WWF for a short time facing The Bushwhackers, The Headshrinkers (Samu and Fatu) and The Smoking Gunns (Bart and Billy Gunn) with various tag team partners before leaving in 1995. During this time, he also wrestled single matches against Davey Boy Smith and Jim Neidhart.

Early the next year, Hardy appeared in World Championship Wrestling with he and Marcus Watson taking on then WCW United States Champion Big Van Vader in a handicap match at Universal Studios in Orlando, Florida on February 5, 1995. Later that month, he and Scott Armstrong faced Colonel Robert Parker's Stud Stable (Bunkhouse Buck and "Dirty" Dick Slater) on February 25. Two months later, Hardy faced Meng at the Center Stage Theater in Atlanta, Georgia and was knocked out in 39 seconds after a superkick. On May 13, Hardy teamed with Chris Speaker and lost to Stars and Stripes (Marcus Alexander Bagwell and The Patriot) on WCW Saturday Night.

=== Independent circuit (1995–2017) ===
After wrestling in the WWF and having a stint in WCW, Hardy wrestled in the independent circuit in 1995. He lost to Mid-West Championship Wrestling Kuku the Wild Samoan at the Lincoln Park Community Center in Lincoln Park, Michigan on June 10, 1995. He reunited with Gill as the Executioners as they lost to Jules Strognbow and Nikolai Volkoff at NCW Joint Show in Ottawa, Ontario, Canada on August 17, 1996.

In early 2000, he began wrestling for the promotion New Millennium Wrestling where he was an instrumental part of bringing independent wrestling back to the Rochester, NY area. He teamed up with Mike "Rose" Rosario, a student Hardy had trained at "Bad Boy's House of Pain. They became known as the tag team Vain and Insane and won the first tournament to become the first NMW Tag Team Champions. Vain and Insane were stripped of their tag team championships and in the next tournament Killer Kowalski, Jr single handedly became the only one man tag team champion. After the breakup Hardy defeated Jason Atlas to become the NMW Heavyweight Champion (which Hardy still defends today).He has defended the title against some of the top wrestlers on the independent circuit including his former tag team partner Duane Gill and Killer Kowalski, Jr., the kayfabe son of Killer Kowalski, whom he defeated in a no-holds-barred street fight. He later left NMW after a dispute, forfeiting the Heavyweight Championship. Months later he wrestled alongside Kowalski Jr. in New York Championship Wrestling (NYCW), based out of Syracuse, NY.

After promoter Zane Allen folded NYCW, Hardy wrestled with Kowalski Jr a few times in Toronto and then relocated to Florida where remained fairly inactive, until returning to Rochester, on March 14, 2009 Hardy returned to Rochester, defeating Eric Everlast for Pier 6 Wrestling. Hardy also wrestled in NEW Niagara on April 4, 2009. On that night, Hardy and his son were defeated by the Emanon Boyz in a gauntlet match. Recently Hardy was listed #494 in the Pro Wrestling Illustrated 500. He thanked wrestling journalist Scotty Bender for rejuvenating his career. On the August 6, 2011 edition of Rochester, NY based Pier 6 Wrestling "Shakedown TV", Barry was defeated by "The Righteous One" JC Money by disqualification. Hardy wrestled in Ohio for American State Wrestling Alliance from 2011 to 2017.

=== Extreme Championship Wrestling (1997) ===
Returning to the United States, Hardy wrestled for Extreme Championship Wrestling during the summer facing Mikey Whipwreck in Buffalo, New York on July 27, 1997. He also teamed with Super Nova against The Dudley Boyz (Bubba and D-Von Dudley) on August 2 and later faced Super Nova in a single match later that month. In a 2009 Interview with Metallic Onslaught, Hardy claimed to have wrestled in ECW for 6–8 months as part of The Full Blooded Italians with Tommy Rich as his manager. This statement appears to be a fabrication of the truth, as there is no record of Hardy as a part of the F.B.I. or having a 6–8 months stint in ECW.

== Championships and accomplishments ==
- American States Wrestling Alliance
  - ASWA Tag Team Championship (2 times) – with Brian Hardy (1) and Izzy Lambert (1)
- Atlantic States Wrestling Alliance
  - ASWA Heavyweight Championship (1 time, inaugural)
  - ASWA Tag Team Championship (2 times) – with Duane Gill
- Championship Wrestling
  - CW American Heavyweight Championship (1 time)
- Eastern Wrestling Federation
  - EWF Tag Team Championship (1 time) – with Duane Gill
- Maryland Championship Wrestling
  - MCW Hall of Fame (Class of 2009)
- Maryland Wrestling Association
  - MWA Maryland Championship (1 time, inaugural)
- Mid-Eastern Wrestling Federation
  - MEWF Tag Team Championship (1 time) – with Duane Gill
- New Millennium Wrestling
  - NMW Heavyweight Tag Team Champions (1 time) – with Mike Rose
- North Eastern Wrestling Federation
  - NEWF American Heavyweight Championship (1 time)
- Pro Wrestling Illustrated
  - PWI ranked him #488 of the top 500 singles wrestlers in the PWI 500 in 2010
- World Wrestling Association
  - WWA Tag Team Championship (3 times) – with Duane Gill
