= Chad Slivenski =

American professional wrestler (born 1972)

Personal information
- Born: September 15, 1972 (age 53) Red Bank, New Jersey, U.S.

Professional wrestling career
- Ring name(s): Chad Bowman; Chad Austin; Pat Patterson Jr. Chad Slivenski
- Billed height: 5 ft 9 in (1.75 m)
- Billed weight: 179 lb (81 kg)
- Billed from: Dundalk, Maryland
- Trained by: Don Owens
- Debut: September 11, 1991

Chad Slivenski (born September 15, 1972) is an American semi-retired professional wrestler, known by his ringname Chad Bowman, who competed in East Coast and Mid-Atlantic independent promotions during the 1990s and 2000s. Early in his career, Slivenski spent time in regional promotions such as the United States Wrestling Association and Smoky Mountain Wrestling before their close in the mid-1990s, and made occasional appearances as a preliminary wrestler in World Wrestling Entertainment.

Slivenski also wrestles under the name "Stone Cold" Chad Austin, an in-ring persona he originally used in Extreme Championship Wrestling, and continued in other Philadelphia-based "hardcore" wrestling promotions such as Combat Zone Wrestling and IWA Mid-South. While in ECW, Austin was subject to a real-life "shoot" when New Jack allegedly broke his leg with a steel chair. In later shoot interviews, New Jack has credited Austin for inadvertently inspiring his 187 finishing move, a top rope dive onto an opponent with a steel chair, which he had first used to injure him.

A mainstay of the Mid-Eastern Wrestling Federation (MEWF) and Maryland Championship Wrestling (MCW), he and kayfabe brother Chip Bowman were members of the "heel" stable Total Quality Management with MCW Heavyweight Champion "Wiseguy" Jimmy Cicero and MCW Tag Team Champions Cueball Carmichael & Dino Devine from 2000 until their breakup in 2002. He and Devine later began teaming together as The Slackers and won both the MEWF and MCW Tag Team titles.

== Professional wrestling career ==
=== Early career (1991–1993) ===
Born in Red Bank, New Jersey, Chad Slivenski trained under Don Owens and made his wrestling debut on September 11, 1991. He spent two years on the East Coast and Mid-Atlantic "indy circuit", as well as stints in the United States Wrestling Association and Smokey Mountain Wrestling, prior to joining Tod Gordon and Eastern Championship Wrestling in Philadelphia, Pennsylvania in late 1993.

=== Extreme Championship Wrestling (1993–1996) ===
Slivenski made his ECW debut as Chad Austin on its third major show, the two-day NWA Bloodfest, at the ECW Arena on October 1, 1993. On both nights, he wrestled The Bad Breed (Ian and Axl Rotten) with Todd Shaw and Don E. Allen respectively, as well as losing to Jimmy "Superfly" Snuka. These matches were later broadcast on the first episodes of ECW Hardcore TV during the next few weeks. On November 14, 1993, Austin was the sole survivor of a six-man elimination tag team match with Watsumi the Rising Sun and Joe College against the American Ninja, Johnny Paradise and The Comet at Kenwood High School in Essex, Maryland.

Slivenski was part of two other memorable Hardcore TV moments that year. On December 13, he was scheduled to face Mr. Hughes but the lights unexpectedly went out, and when they came back on again, the entire ECW locker room was engaged in a brawl in the ring. A week later, Slivenski was brought out by Terry Funk as a mock Sabu impersonator and attacked by Funk. When Sabu's then manager Paul E. Dangerously confronted Funk, he was chased off. In front of a sold-out crowd at the ECW Arena, Slivenski scored an upset victory over Pitbull #1 in his ECW debut at Holiday Hell 1993 on December 26, 1993. When his opponent continued attacking him after the match, The Sandman came to his rescue. This match aired on Hardcore TV three days later.

Slivenski continued to be a regular at the ECW Arena during the next year. On February 5, 1994, he lost to 911 in the opening match of ECW's The Night the Line Was Crossed. In the first half of 1994, he also faced The Public Enemy (Rocco Rock & Johnny Grunge), Johnny Hotbody, The Sandman, Hack Meyers and Shane Douglas. On April 9, he challenged Ricky Blues at the Mid-Eastern Wrestling Federation's Kenwood Khaos in Essex.

That summer, he appeared on three major ECW shows. On June 24, his match against Don E. Allen at Hostile City Showdown 1994 ended in a no-contest when 911 interfered and incapacitated both men with a chokeslam. A month later at Heat Wave 1994, Slivenski was disqualified in his match against ECW Television Champion Mikey Whipwreck as well as their rematch in Wildwood, New Jersey a week later. Five days later in Montgomeryville, Pennsylvania, he teamed with Rockin' Rebel and Jason Knight in a six-man tag team match to defeat Don E. Allen, Dino Sendoff and Hack Meyers. On August 13, he defeated "Ironman" Tommy Cairo at Hardcore Heaven 1994. He also wrestled Mr. Hughes, Sabu, Damien Stone, Steve Richards, Rockin' Rebel and Chris Benoit on Hardcore TV over the summer.

On November 22, he and Hack Meyers lost to Stevie Richards and JT Smith in a tag team match and, the following week, wrestled Shane Douglas for the ECW Heavyweight Championship. On December 24, 1994, Slivenski participated in a battle royal at the ECW Arena. He was the event's first entrant and, upon entering the ring, announced he was quitting ECW and had bought a house in Atlanta claiming he was soon heading to World Championship Wrestling adding that "ECW was small time". Upon hearing this, everyone in the battle royal immediately entered the ring to go after Slivenski and threw him out. Led by Shane Douglas, the wrestlers forced him to say "ECW is number one!" in the house microphone. This resulted in Tod Gordon coming out and ordering everyone to the back, with the exception of Axl Rotten and Pitbull #2, and reenter the ring under Royal Rumble-style rules. The event was later included as part of ECW Extreme Warfare, Vol. 1.

On January 7, 1995, Slivenski lost to JT Smith at the ECW Arena and to The Tazmaniac at the Big Apple Dinner Theater in Kennett Square, Pennsylvania on February 24. The following night at ECW's Return of the Funker, he and Joel Hartgood lost to The Pitbulls (Pitbull #1 and Pitbull #2) in front of 1,150 fans.

At Hardcore Heaven 1995, a tag team match between himself and The Broad Street Bully against Dino Sendoff and Don E. Allen ended in a no contest when 911, as he did the previous year, entered the ring and choke slammed all four men. He and Don E. Allen also lost to Dances with Dudley & Dudley Dudley at Gangsta's Paradise on August 16. Slivenski also defeated Raven for the MEWF Mid-Atlantic Championship on October 1, 1995. He lost the title to Corporal Punishment on November 12, and after it was declared vacant the next month, lost to Devon Storm in a match to determine the new champion.

On April 1, 1996, Slivenski was involved in a real-life "shoot" with New Jack when he took part in a tag team "double tables" match with The Blue Meanie against The Gangstas at an April Fool's Day television taping for ECW Hardcore TV. Slivenski had replaced Meanie's original partner, Stevie Richards, who had suffered a cracked orbital bone during an altercation with Tommy Dreamer and Shane Douglas. According to New Jack, as with the Mass Transit incident, he "didn't like his attitude" and had particularly taken offense when Slivenski approached him to discuss the match beforehand. At the end of the match, New Jack dove off the top rope with a steel chair and onto Slivenski injuring his face. Afterwards, he took the chair and hit him five times breaking his leg as well. He later began using the move, referred to as the 187, as his finisher and has credited Slivenski, albeit sarcastically, for its creation.

=== Mid-Eastern Wrestling Federation and the Independent circuit (1996–1999) ===
Leaving ECW shortly after this incident, Slivenski began competing in the Mid-Eastern Wrestling Federation (MEWF). A month before his run-in with New Jack, he had wrestled Steve Corino in Baltimore. His injuries caused him to miss a year of ringtime before eventually returning to the ring in early 1997. In one of his first matches back, he was scheduled to headline a National Wrestling League show in Boonsboro, Maryland with Devon Storm on April 22, 1997, but the match was cancelled when Storm was unable to appear. A year later, he lost to The Cat Burglar in a 3 Way Dance with Steve Corino for the MEWF Light Heavyweight Championship on September 18, 1998. On October 1, 1999, he wrestled Jake Daniels for The Bad Crew's Hardway Wrestling in Bethlehem, Pennsylvania. He also wrestled for Atlantic Terror Championship Wrestling and Cueball Carmichael's Independent Pro Wrestling Alliance.

=== Maryland Championship Wrestling (2000–2003) ===
In early 2000, Slivenski started wrestling for Maryland Championship Wrestling (MCW). On January 19, 2000, he teamed with "Wiseguy" Jimmy Cicero in a match for the then vacant MCW Tag Team Championship and lost to The Holy Rollers (Earl the Pearl & Rich Myers) in a 3 Way Dance with The Badstreet Boys (Joey Matthews & Christian York) in Glen Burnie, Maryland. On April 14, he became the MCW Cruiserweight Champion in Annapolis by defeating Adam Flash and Quinn Nash in an elimination match. Around this time, he and kayfabe brother Chip Bowman joined Cicero's "heel" stable Total Quality Management with MCW Tag Team Champions Cueball Carmichael & Dino Devine. Two weeks later, he and Chip joined Cicero in a 6-man tag team match against King Kong Bundy and The Ghetto Mafia (2-Dope & Sydeswype) in Lusby, Maryland on April 29.

Over the next seven months, Slivenski successfully defended his title against Mikey Whipreck, Qenaan Creed and Black Dragon. He also defeated former champion Adam Flash at a special MCW show near Ocean City, Maryland on June 10 and Ronnie Zukko at the 2000 Shane Shamrock Memorial Cup on July 19. That summer, he and Qenaan Creed became involved in a 3-month feud over the title. At an October 28 show in Glen Burnie, Creed was briefly awarded the title after using a chain brought by Slivenski to pin the champion. When the referee spotted the chain, it was assumed it belonged to Creed and he was disqualified. A local disc jockey who had been invited to the event, and had been attacked by Total Quality Management earlier in the show, informed the referee what had taken place and the decision was again reversed giving Creed the win via disqualification but not the belt. He finally lost the title to Creed a month later in Odenton. On December 6, 2000, he and Chip Bowman took on Qenaan Creed and Kelly Bell in Glen Burnie.

During the next year, Slivenski cut down on his ring schedule to recuperate from an injury. On July 28, 2001, Slivenski lost to Julio Dinero in Bel Air, Maryland. At the end of the year, he and Dino Devine lost to Van Hammer & The Cowboy, a local WZBH disc jockey, in Laurel on December 16, 2001.

On January 30, 2002, he appeared with Total Quality Management in their final match together in front of an estimated 1,200 fans at an MCW Rage TV taping in Glen Burnie. He had been scheduled to take part in a 6-man tag team match with Dino Divine and Kelly Bell against Jimmy Cicero and The Badstreet Boys (Joey Matthews & Christian York) but was replaced by ex-member Cueball Carmichael. Slivenski's team lost when Carmichael was pinned and, according to the pre-match stipulations, TQM was forced to disband.

Soon after the TQM's breakup, Slivenski formed a tag team with former stablemate Dino Divine called The Slackers. On February 16, they defeated Van Hammer & The Cowboy in a rematch on MCW Rage TV in Harrington, Delaware but lost to Gillberg & Steve Wilkos of the Jerry Springer Show at Michael's Eighth Avenue in Glen Burnie a month later. In his pro wrestling debut, Wilkos put both men in the sleeperhold to get the victory. The Slackers bounced back by winning the MCW Tag Team Championship from The Badstreet Boys on the May 22nd edition of Rage TV. The team defended the titles against The S.A.T. (Jose & Joel Maximo) at the 2002 Shane Shamrock Memorial Cup as well as Briscoe Brothers (Jay and Mark Briscoe) and The Holy Rollers (Earl The Pearl & Ramblin Rich) during the next few months. On August 16, Slivenski made a one-time appearance for Beautiful Babes of Wrestling to wrestle Alexis Laree in an intergender match in Martinsburg, West Virginia.

In early 2003, The Slackers became involved in a feud with The Bruiser when, on January 29, they interfered in his match against Danny Doring costing him the MCW Heavyweight Championship. Slivenski managed to beat him in a singles match on March 12 and, with Devine, in a tag team match with Romeo Valentine on May 15. Slivenski and Devine remained tag team champions until MCW's final show, the 5th annual 2003 Shane Shamrock Memorial Cup in Glen Burnie on July 16, 2003. In a special interpromotional match, they lost to The Ghetto Mafia in a 3 Way Dance with MEWF Tag Team Champions Team Punishment (Derek Wayne & Buzz Stryker) to unify both titles.

=== Return to the Indies (2003–2005) ===
After the close of MCW, Slivenski competed for various independent promotions in the Mid-Atlantic area. In the Mid-Eastern Wrestling Federation, he lost to "Hollywood" Bob Starr in a match for the vacant MEWF Mid-Atlantic Championship in North Point, Maryland on September 7. On October 18, he appeared at "UnCivil War" for the National Wrestling League and House of Pain Wrestling Federation, held at a local high school in Gettysburg, Pennsylvania, where he and Shawn Summers took on The Big New Yorkers (Jerkface & Jackpot Jimmy Jessup) but lost via disqualification when their valet, Katravina, was caught trying to stop Jessup from pinning Slivenski. On November 15, 2003, he lost to Hyjinx in a Four Corners match with OGB and Brandon Mercury for the NWL Cruiserweight Championship in Newville, Pennsylvania.

On January 11, 2004, Slivenski and Divine captured the MEWF Tag Team Championship from Suicide & Bruiser and held the titles for the next three months. Two weeks later, he lost to Chris Nightmare in Smyrna, Delaware for Maximum Championship Wrestling on January 24. He also made another NWL/HoPWF appearance on February 14 where he unexpectedly won the NWL Cruiserweight Championship from OGB in a lumberjack match in Blue Ridge Summit, Pennsylvania. Prior to the match, he introduced the 6'8" 330-pound Dorian DeVille as his new manager and had helped Slivenski win the title with outside interference. He was stripped of the belt the next month after failing to make a scheduled title defense in Newville on March 6. Three weeks later, he showed up at an MEWF show at the Northpoint Flea Market in Dundalk, Maryland.

Slivenski returned to the NWL to participate in a fundraising event for wrestler Adam Helsley, who was severely injured in a car accident the previous year, where he wrestled The Dynamic Sensation at Paw Paw High School in Paw Paw, West Virginia on May 8. Also appearing on the card was Morgus the Maniac, John Rambo and former WWF World Tag Team Champion Headshrinker Samu. Two months later, he regained the NWL Cruiserweight title from Hyjinx in a no-disqualification match in Martinsburg, West Virginia on July 17. Slivenski would hold the title for over eight months, the second-longest reign in the title's history, until losing it to Fumar in Hagerstown, Maryland on April 2, 2005.

The previous month, he had wrestled Morgus the Maniac at a Maryland Wrestling Alliance card in Glen Bernie. He also returned to the ECW Arena after nearly a decade where, as Chad Austin, he participated in a 5-team Royal Rumble-style tables elimination match at IWA Mid-South's "Something to Prove" show on June 11. Substituting for Silas Young, he and Eric Priest were the first entrants and were met by ROH students Davey Andrews and Shane Hagadorn. Both Slivenski and Hagadorn's teams were simultaneously eliminated when Eddie Kingston powerbombed Hagadorn onto an already prone Slivenski though a table. The match was eventually won by The Iron Saints (Vito and Sal Thomaselli) becoming 5-time IWA Mid-South Tag Team Champions. Later that year, Slivenski reunited with Dino Devine in Fort Meade Wrestling to defeat their old MCW rivals The Holy Rollers at the Fort Meade Army Base in Odenton, Maryland on October 1, 2005.

=== Maryland Championship Wrestling (2006–present) ===
When Maryland Championship Wrestling resumed operations in late 2006, The Slackers were among the first alumni to return to the promotion. On February 26, 2006, The Slackers briefly won the MCW Tag Team titles in a 4 Way Dance with The Holy Rollers and Jason Static & Judas Young at MCW's "Resurrection" in Dundalk, Maryland. Later that night, however, they lost the titles to The James Gang (BG James & Kip James) in a 3 Way Dance with The Holy Rollers when referee Earl Hebner turned heel and made a "fast count" to give them the win. Hebner then got into a fight with another referee who put him in a sharpshooter and made him "tap out". The Slackers were given another chance to win back the titles at the March 26th "The Phenomenal Four" show but lost to Danny Doring & Danny Jax in another 4 Way Dance with The Holy Rollers and The James Gang.

Unable to regain the titles, The Slackers turned towards The Holy Rollers with whom they feuded for the next three months. Although they lost to them in a lumberjack match at Guerrilla Warfare on April 22, they defeated them in an Evening Gown match at Xtreme Measures a month later. The feud ended at Red, White, Black & Bruised when they defeated The Holy Rollers at the Fort Meade Army Base on July 22. As a result of their victory, The Holy Rollers were forced to break up and Earl The Pearl had to leave MCW. One week later, Slivenski appeared as Chad Austin at Combat Zone Wrestling's Tournament Of Death V in Smyrna, Delaware where he wrestled Kylie Pierce in an intergender match. Slivenski lost the match after Pierce hit him with a light tube.

A few months later, The Slackers teamed with Tito Santana in a 6-man tag team match to defeat Buck and Phat Blues Security at MCW's "Tribute To The Legends" show in Dundalk on September 10, and beat Buck Chyld & Doyle Day at "Monster Mash" on October 29. On November 11, they lost to Bruiser & Genesis in a 4 Way Dance against the Rehoboth Beach Crew and Phat Blues Security at North Carroll High School in Hampstead, Maryland. At MCW's Holiday Homecoming, Slivenski and Devine lost to The Ghetto Mafia in a grudge match at Michael's Eighth Avenue in Glen Burnie on December 28, 2006.

On February 25, 2007, The Slackers defeated the Rehoboth Beach Crew (Stevie Riggs & LK) at MCW's 9th Anniversary Show at the MCW Arena in Dundalk. The following month, he and Devine faced two of the three members of the RBC at "March Madness: When Monsters Collide"; while Devine lost to L.K., Slivenski beat Tyler Hilton to win the MCW Rage Television Championship. On April 21, The Slackers teamed with Doink the Clown in a 6-man tag team match to defeat the Rehoboth Beach Crew (Tyler Hilton, Stevie Riggs & LK) at Aggravated Assault '07. The event was held at the Arena Club in Bel Air, Maryland with over 1,000 in attendance. After six weeks as champion, Slivenski re-lost the title to Hilton at Xtreme Measures II in Dundalk.

That fall, he was one of several wrestlers nominated by fans in an online vote to challenge Hilton for the title at the upcoming "Kickoff Chaos" supercard on September 9. The other nominees included his tag team partner Dino Divine, Stevie Riggs and LK of the Rehoboth Beach Crew, Buck Chyld, Ramblin Rich and Patrick Brink. On December 8, he wrestled at a Maximum Championship Wrestling supercard, "The Road to Full Access 4", in Blue Ridge Summit and lost to MCW Heavyweight Champion Matt Turner in a non-title match. At Holiday Homecoming '07, Slivenski lost to Ruckus at Michael's 8th Avenue in Glen Burnie.

In early 2008, Slivenski made several appearances for the Eastern Wrestling Alliance in Baltimore. On March 16, he defeated Jimmy Starz at its "Fight The Power" supercard. After the match, he was attacked by The Varsity (Zach Matthews & Bruce Chan). He made another appearance a month later losing to Zachary Shane at Baltimore's Tall Cedar Hall on April 20. Later that year, he and Kylie Pierce lost an intergender tag team match to Angela & The Baltimore Bully at MCW's "Raven’s Kickoff" in Canton, Maryland on September 5, 2008. On November 7, 2009, he lost to Queenan Creed a 3 Way Dance with Andrew Ryker at the New Green Room in Dundalk.

== Championships and accomplishments ==
- Maryland Championship Wrestling
  - MCW Rage Television Championship (1 time)
  - MCW Cruiserweight Championship (1 time)
  - MCW Tag Team Championship (2 times) with Dino Devine
- Mid-Eastern Wrestling Federation
  - MEWF Heavyweight Championship (1 time)
  - MEWF Mid-Atlantic Championship (2 times)
  - MEWF Tag Team Championship (2 times) - with Dino Devine (1) and Dino Casanova (1)
- National Wrestling League
  - NWL Cruiserweight Championship (2 times)

== Other appearances ==
- On Patrol Live 11/1/2025
