= Rustee Thomas =

American wrestler (1957–2025)

Personal information
- Born: Rebecca Thomas; March 11, 1957 Richmond, Virginia, U.S.
- Died: June 1, 2025 (aged 68)

Professional wrestling career
- Ring name(s): Rustee Thomas; Rusty Fox; Rusty Thomas; Rustee The Fox Thomas
- Billed height: 5 ft 6 in (1.68 m)
- Billed weight: 136 lb (62 kg)
- Billed from: Richmond, Virginia
- Debut: 1988
- Retired: 1999

Rebecca Thomas (March 11, 1957 – June 1, 2025), also known by her stage names Rustee Thomas and Rusty Fox, was an American professional wrestler who worked in the WWF, LPWA, NWL and HOPWF in the 1990s.

== Professional wrestling career ==
Thomas made her wrestling debut in 1988. Mainly worked for National Wrestling League. She would feud with Heidi Lee Morgan during her career.

She won the NWL Women's Championship three times from 1991 to 1992 and 1997 to 1998.

She wrestled in the WWF Women's Championship tournament in November 1993, defeating Angie Marino in the first round and losing to her rival Heidi Lee Morgan in the semi-finals. In July 1994, she returned to the WWF losing house shows to Heidi Lee Morgan.

Later in her career, she worked in the independent circuit, House Of Pain Wrestling Federation and returned to the National Wrestling League in 1997.

She retired from wrestling in 1999.

== Death ==
On June 1, 2025 Thomas passed away at 68.

== Championships and accomplishments ==
- National Wrestling League
  - NWL Women's Championship (3 times)
