= List of former Mid-Eastern Wrestling Federation personnel =

The Mid-Eastern Wrestling Federation was a professional wrestling promotion based in Essex, Maryland from 1991 to 2004. Former employees in the MEWF consisted of professional wrestlers, managers, play-by-play and color commentators, announcers, interviewers and referees.

== Alumni ==
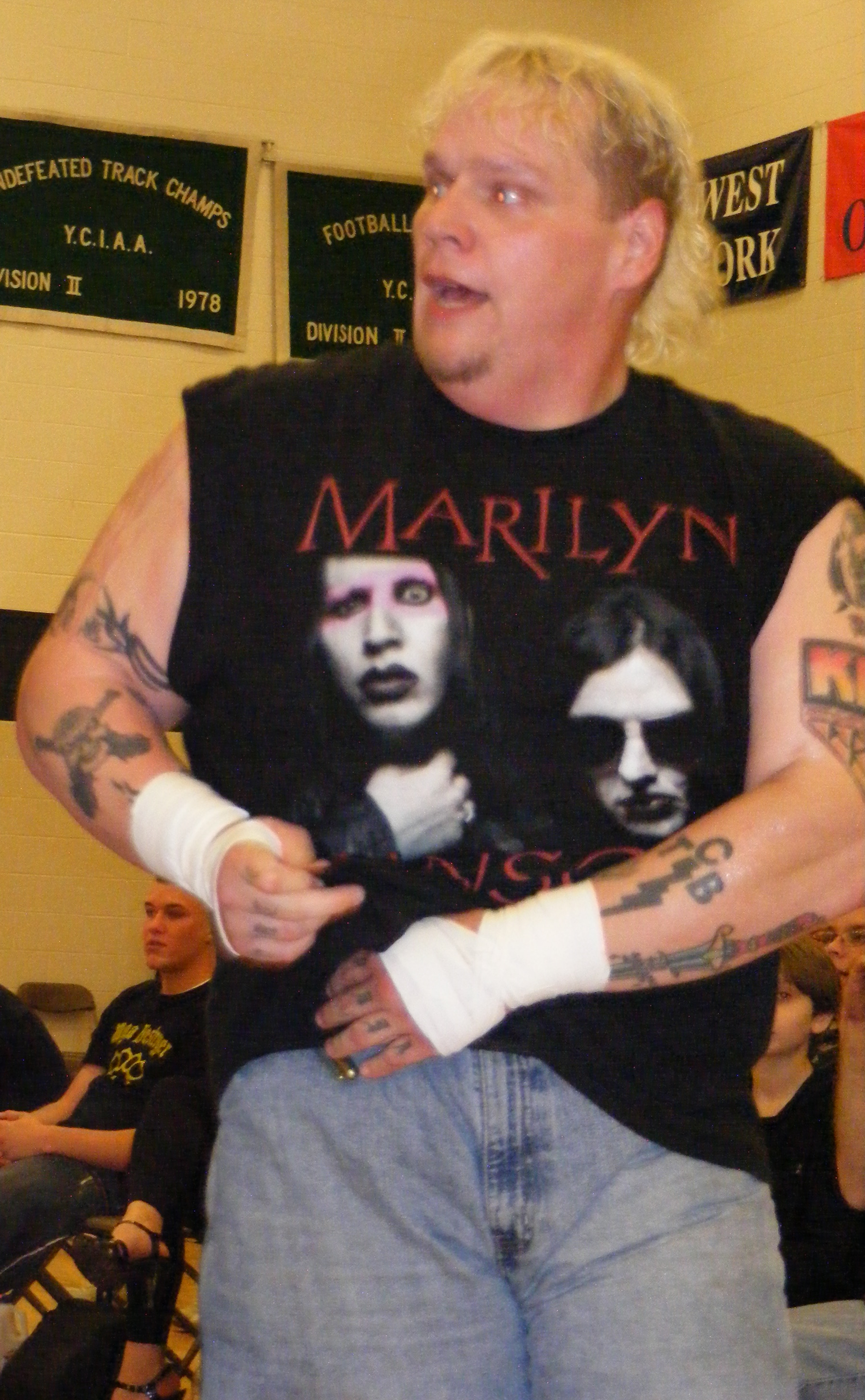
Axl Rotten

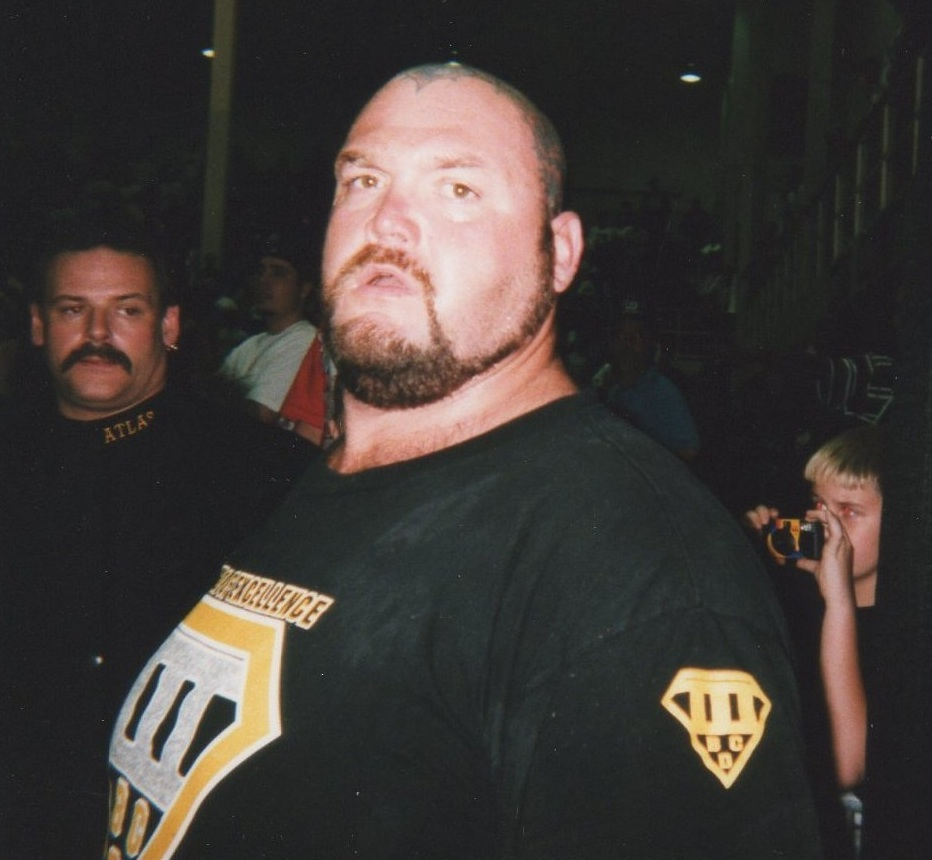
Bam Bam Bigelow

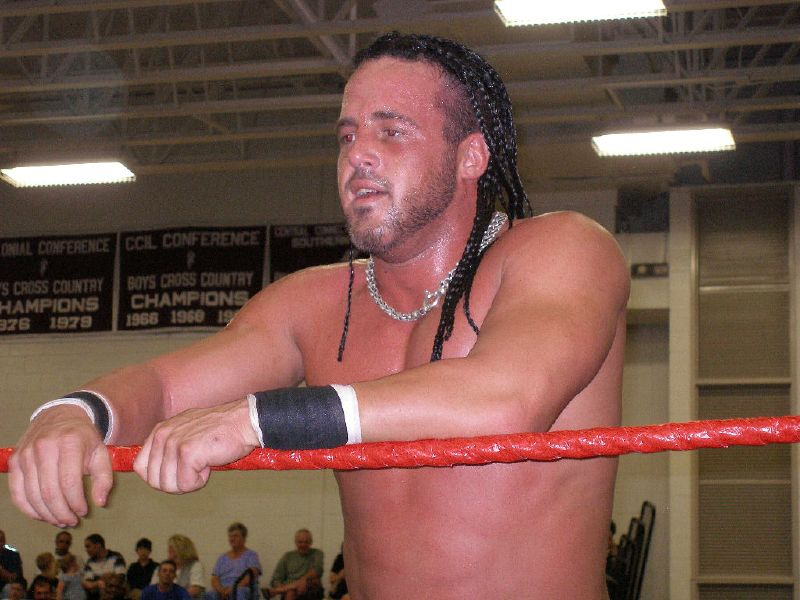
Joey Matthews

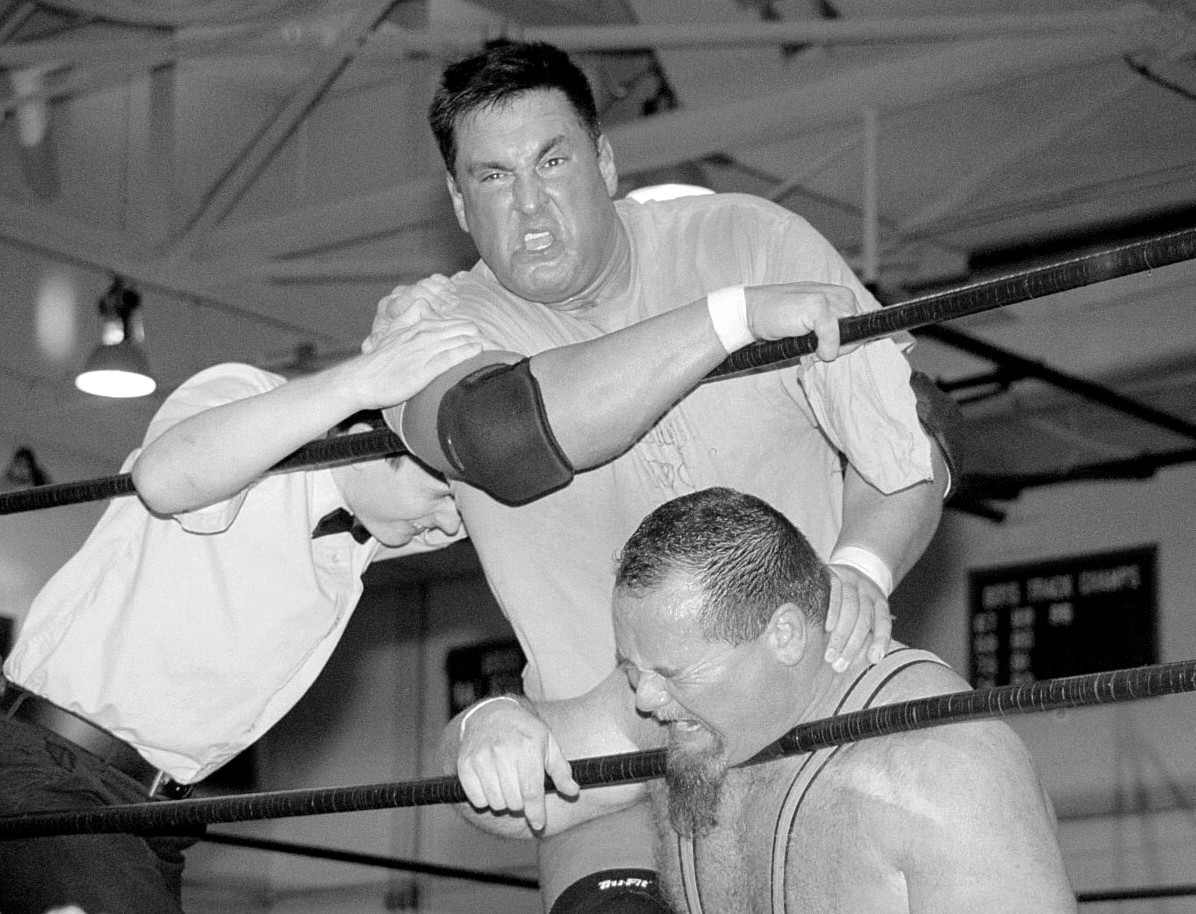
Salvatore Sincere and Jim Neidhart

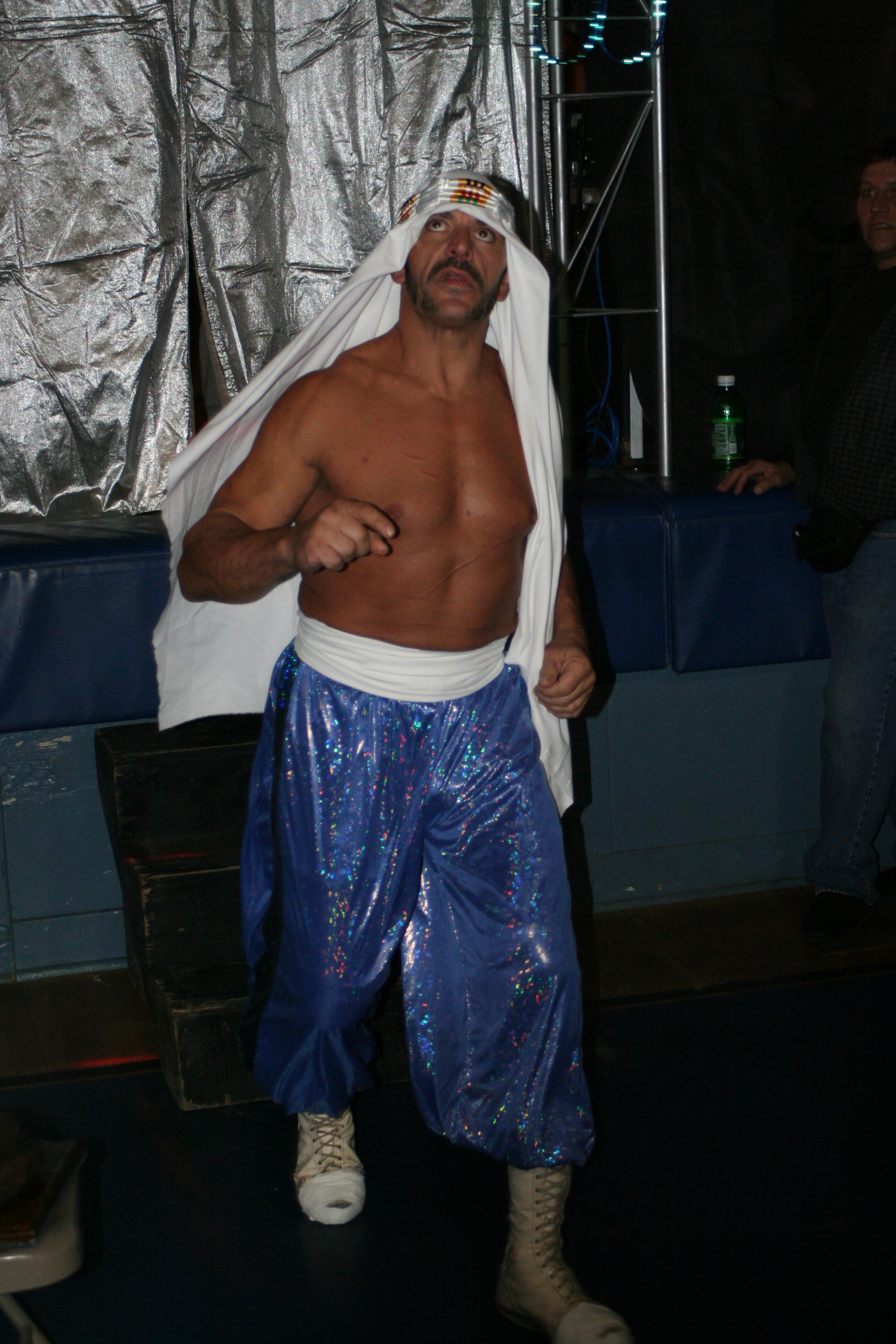
Sabu

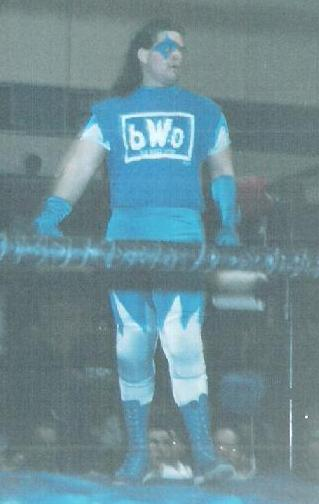
Hollywood Nova

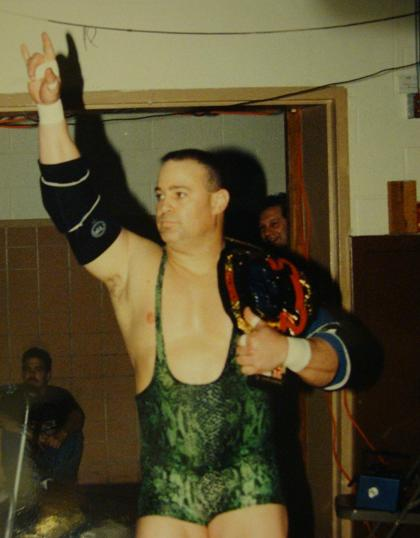
Tommy Cairo

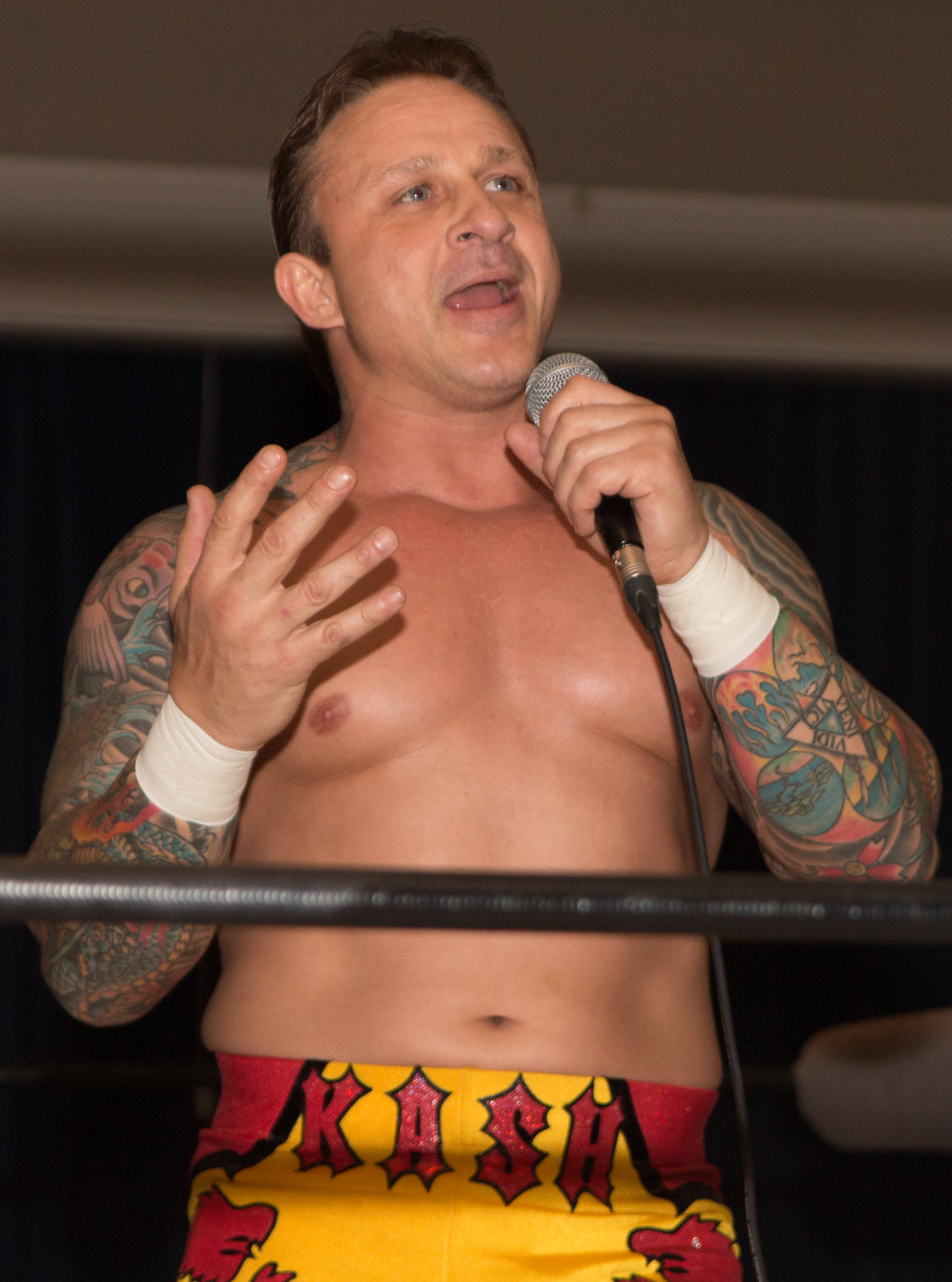
Kid Kash

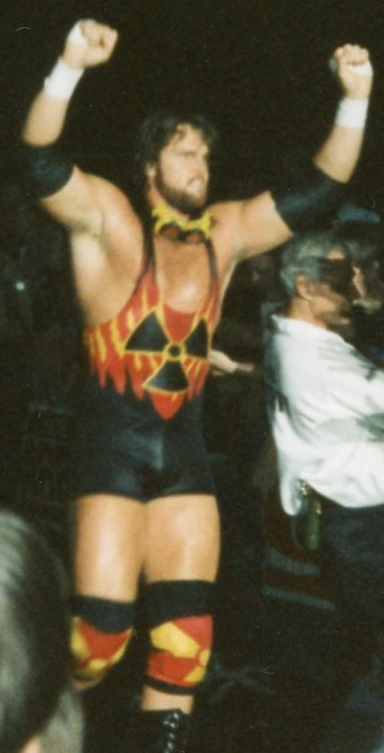
Adam Bomb

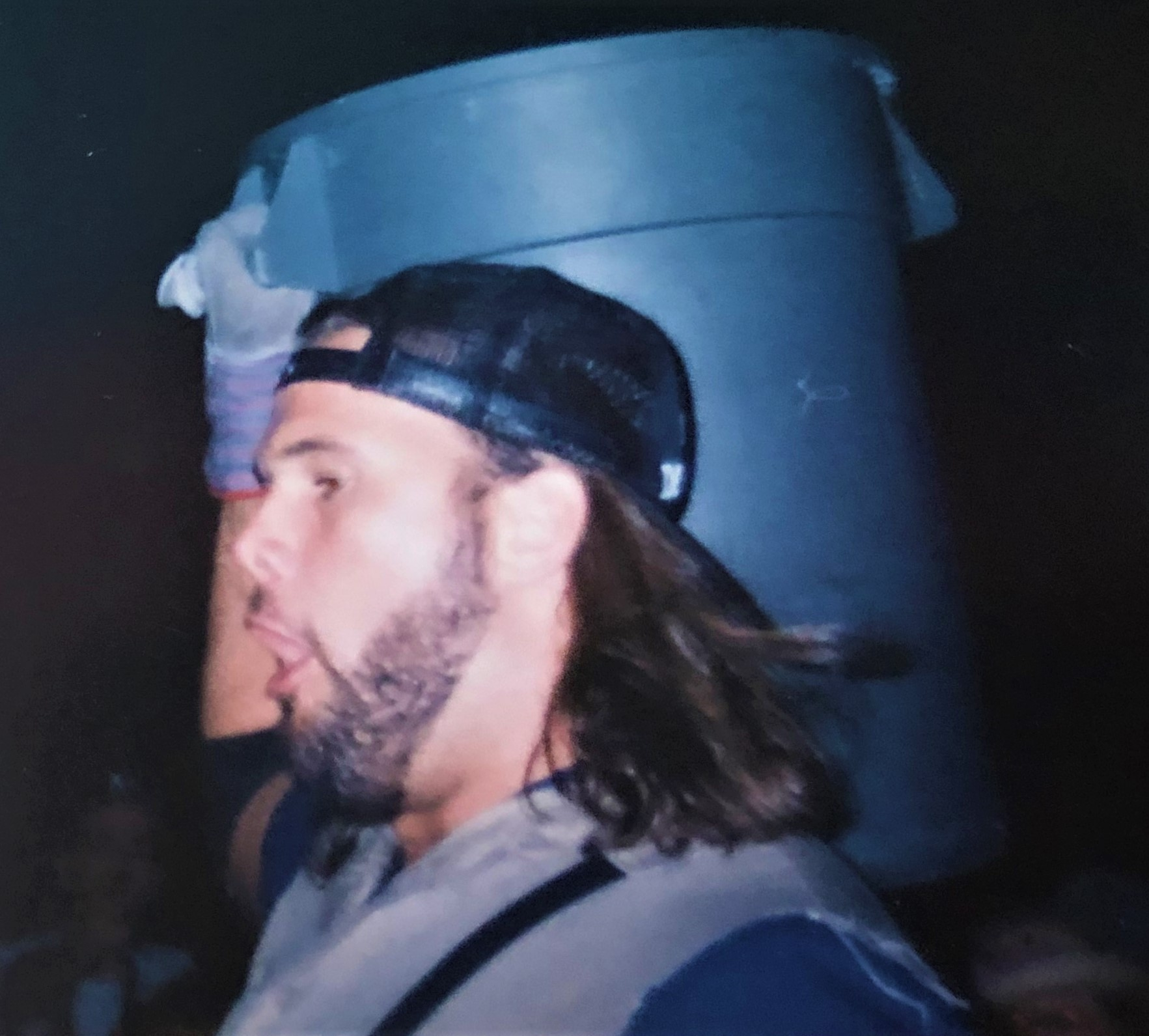
Duke Droese

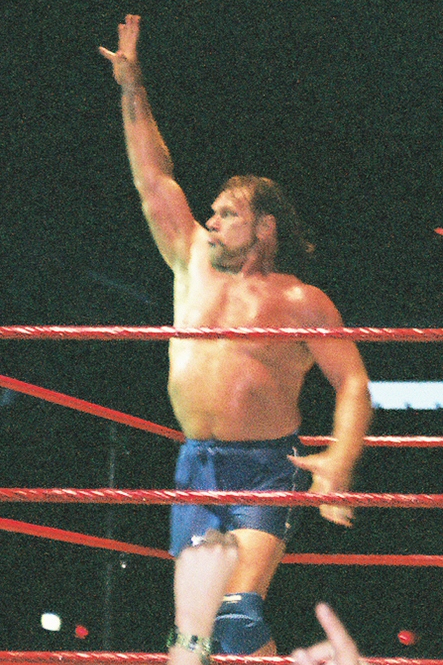
Jim Duggan

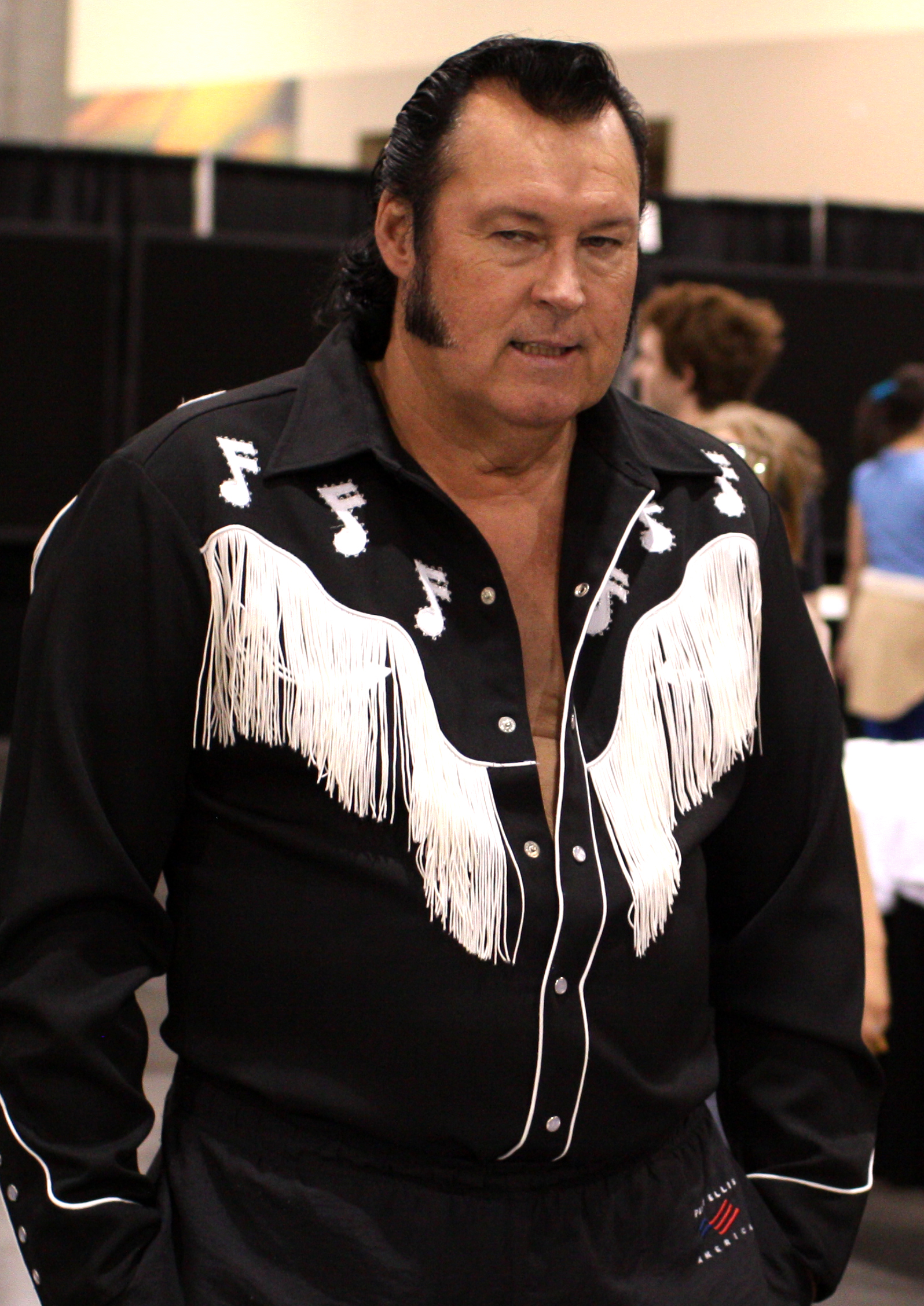
Honky Tonk Man

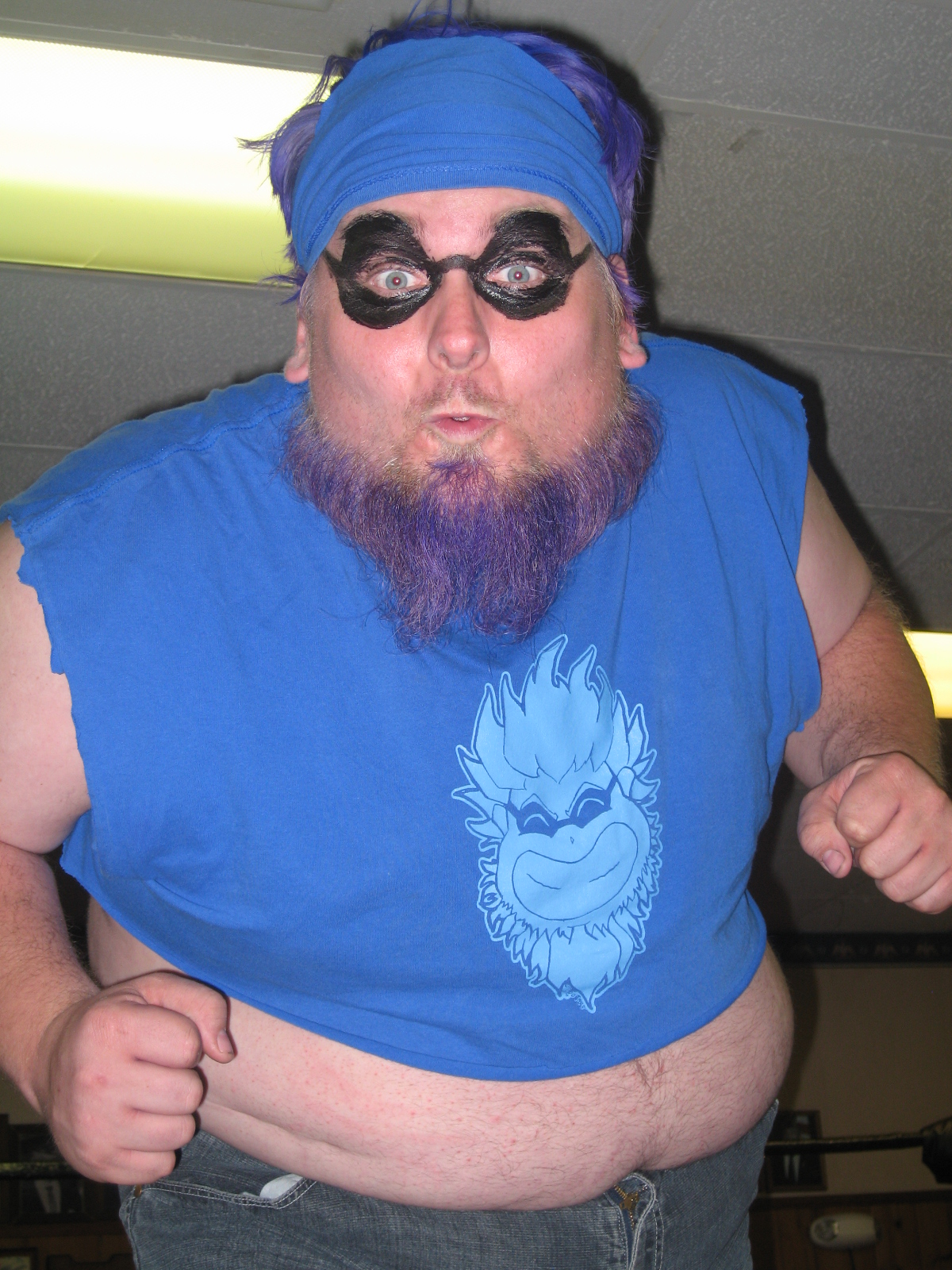
The Blue Meanie

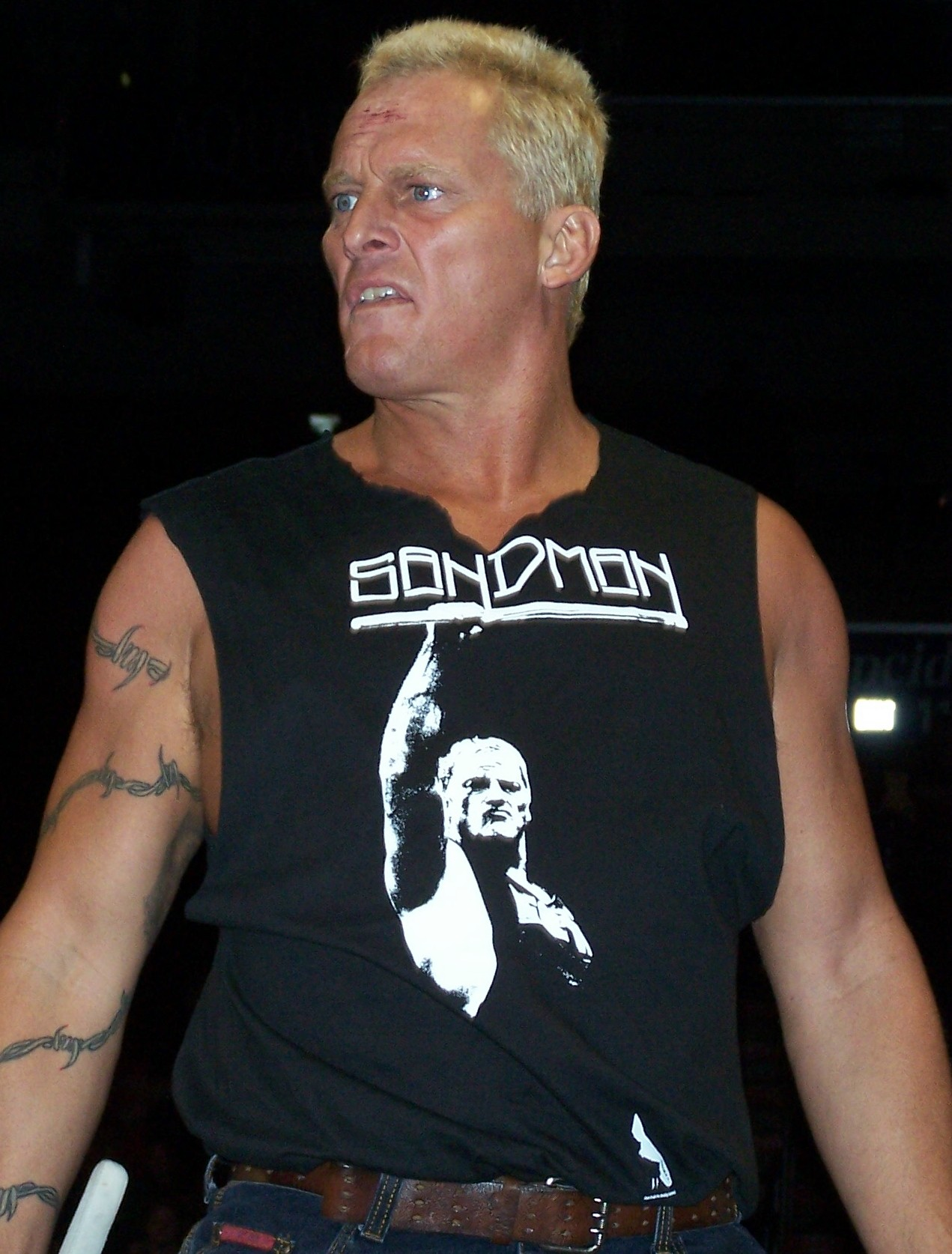
The Sandman

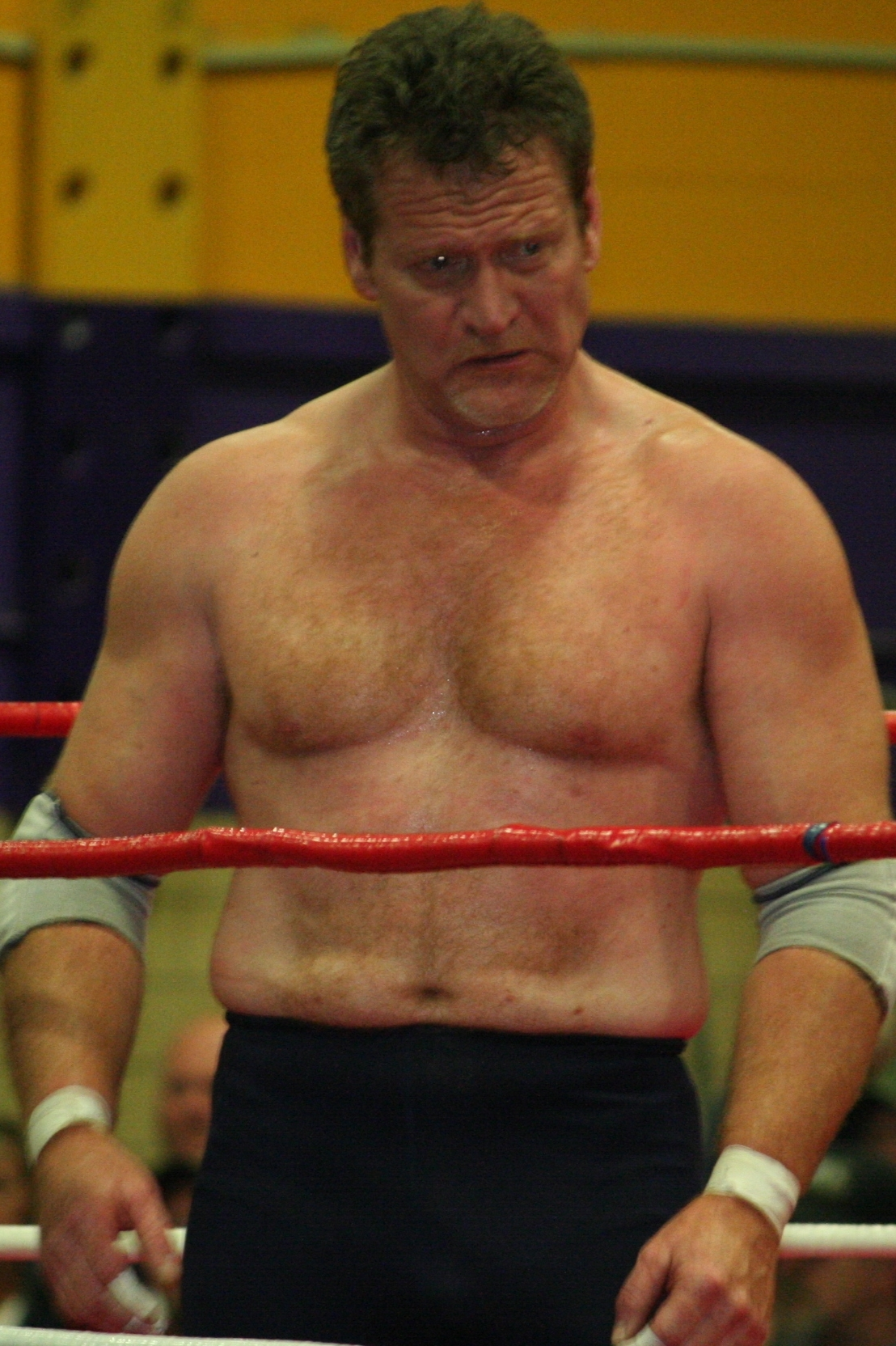
Rip Sawyer

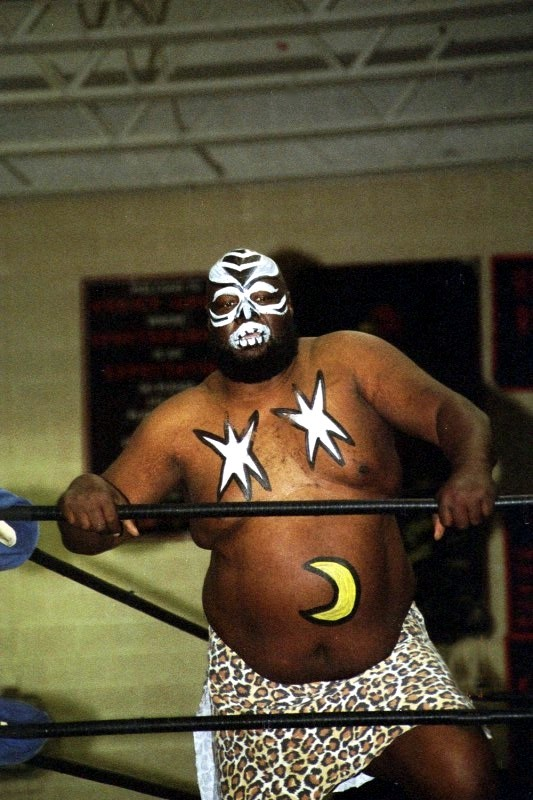
Kamala

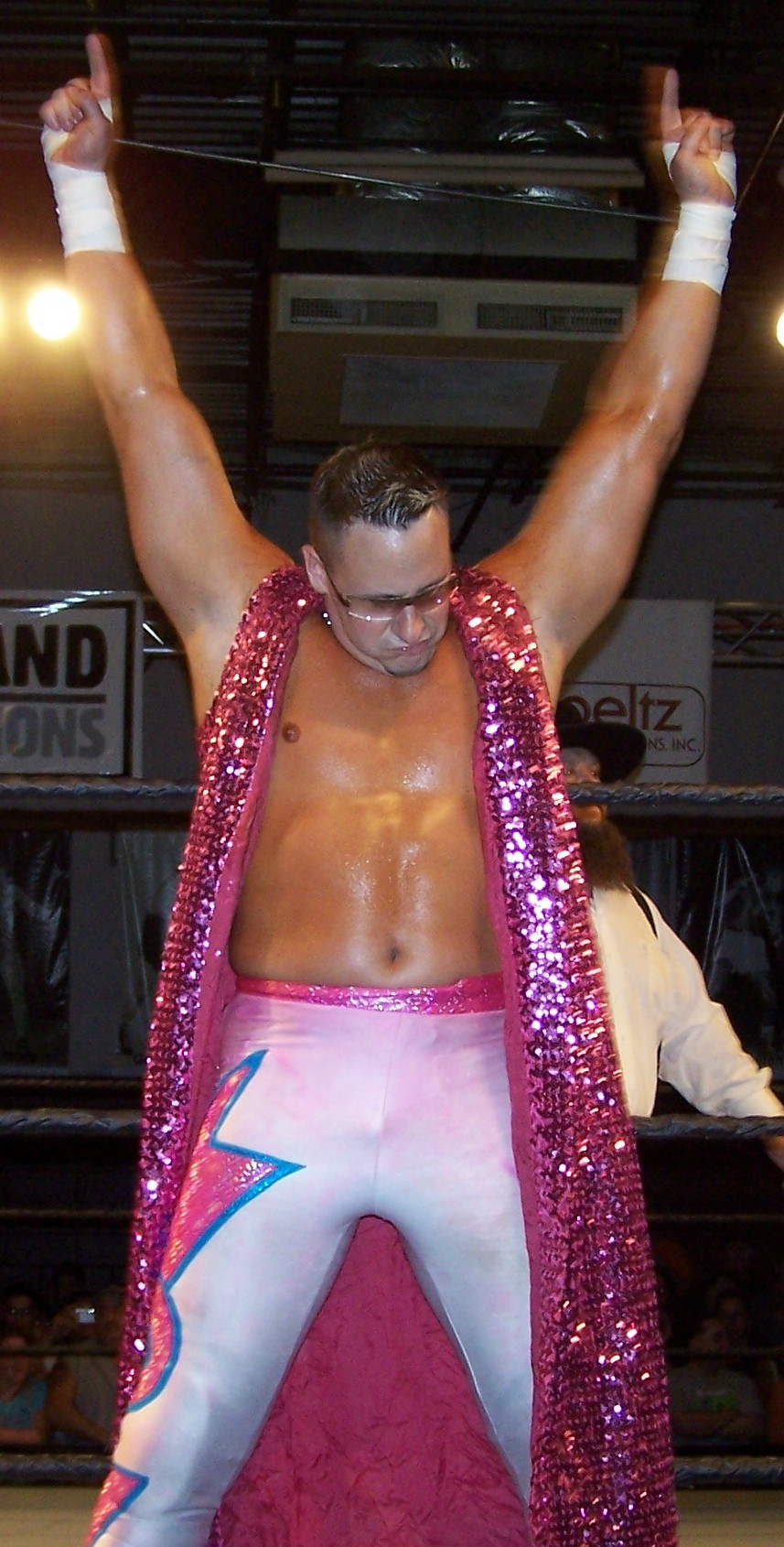
Danny Doring

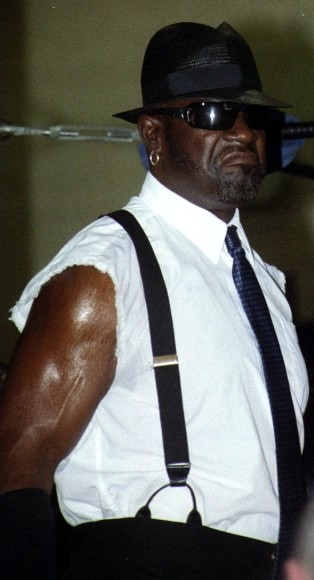
Mr. Hughes

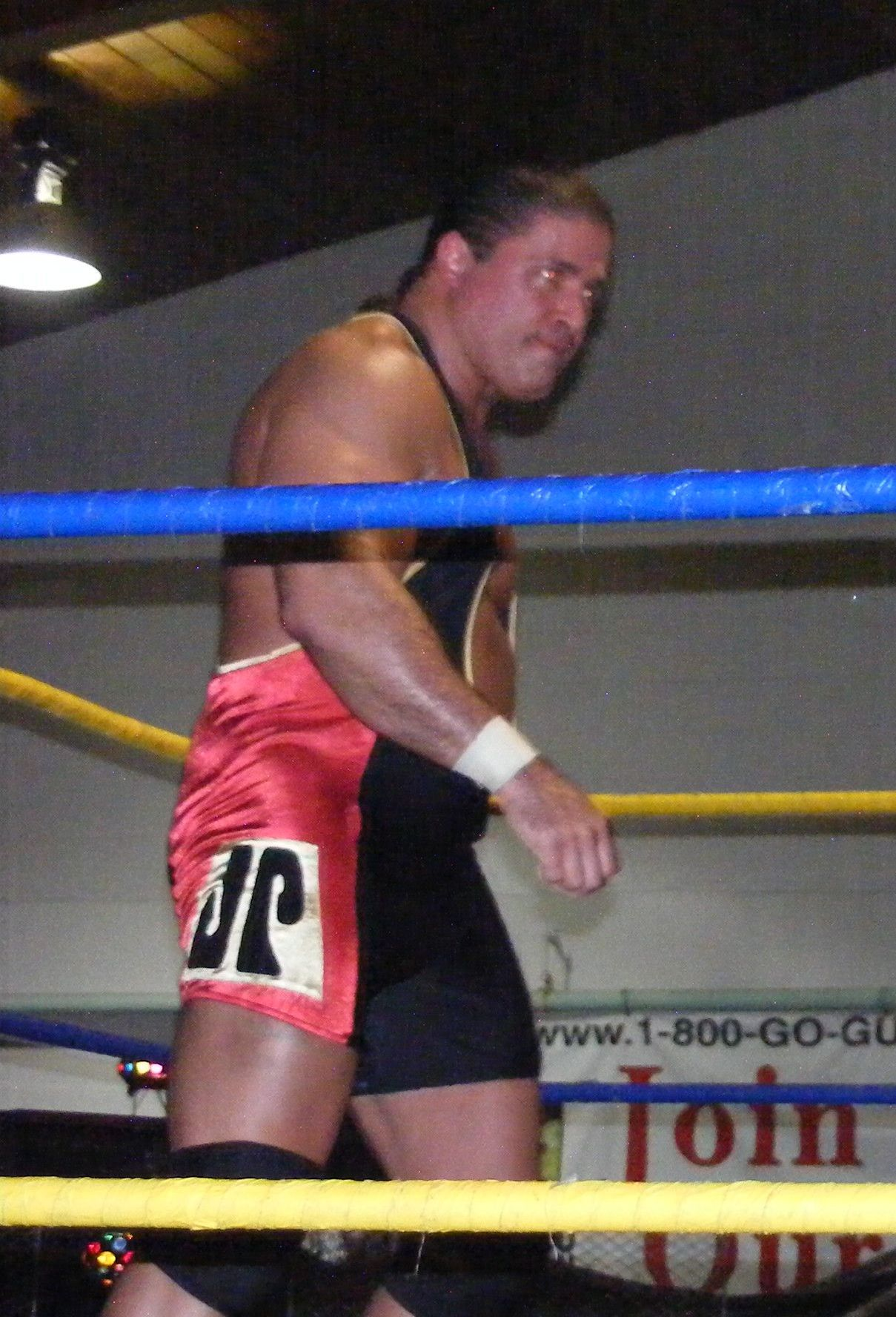
Jim Powers

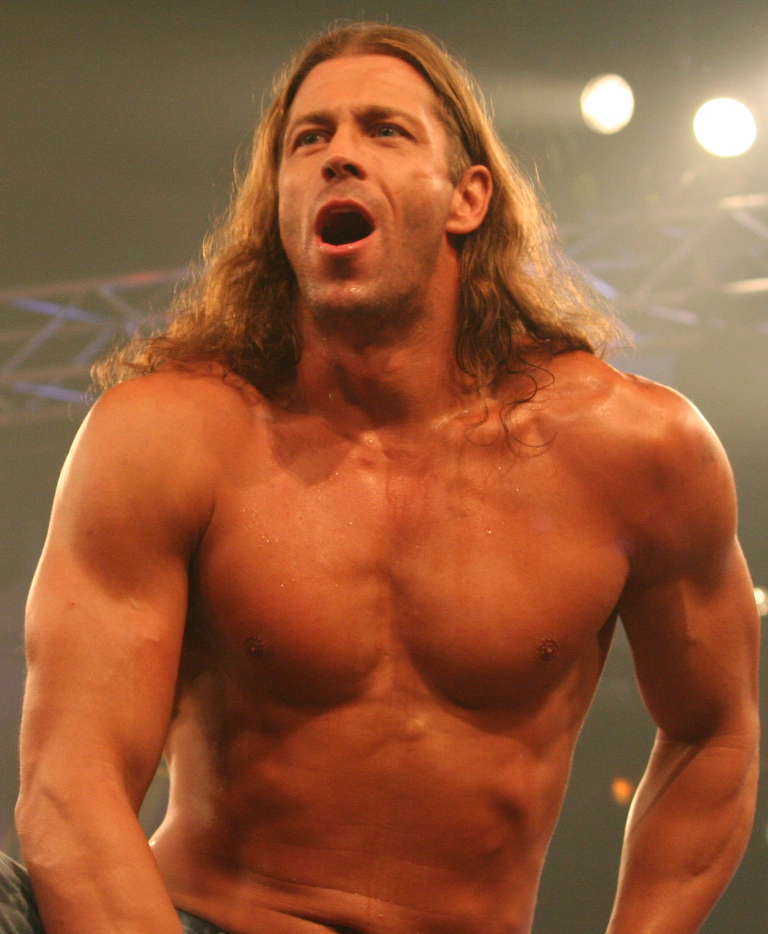
Stevie Richards

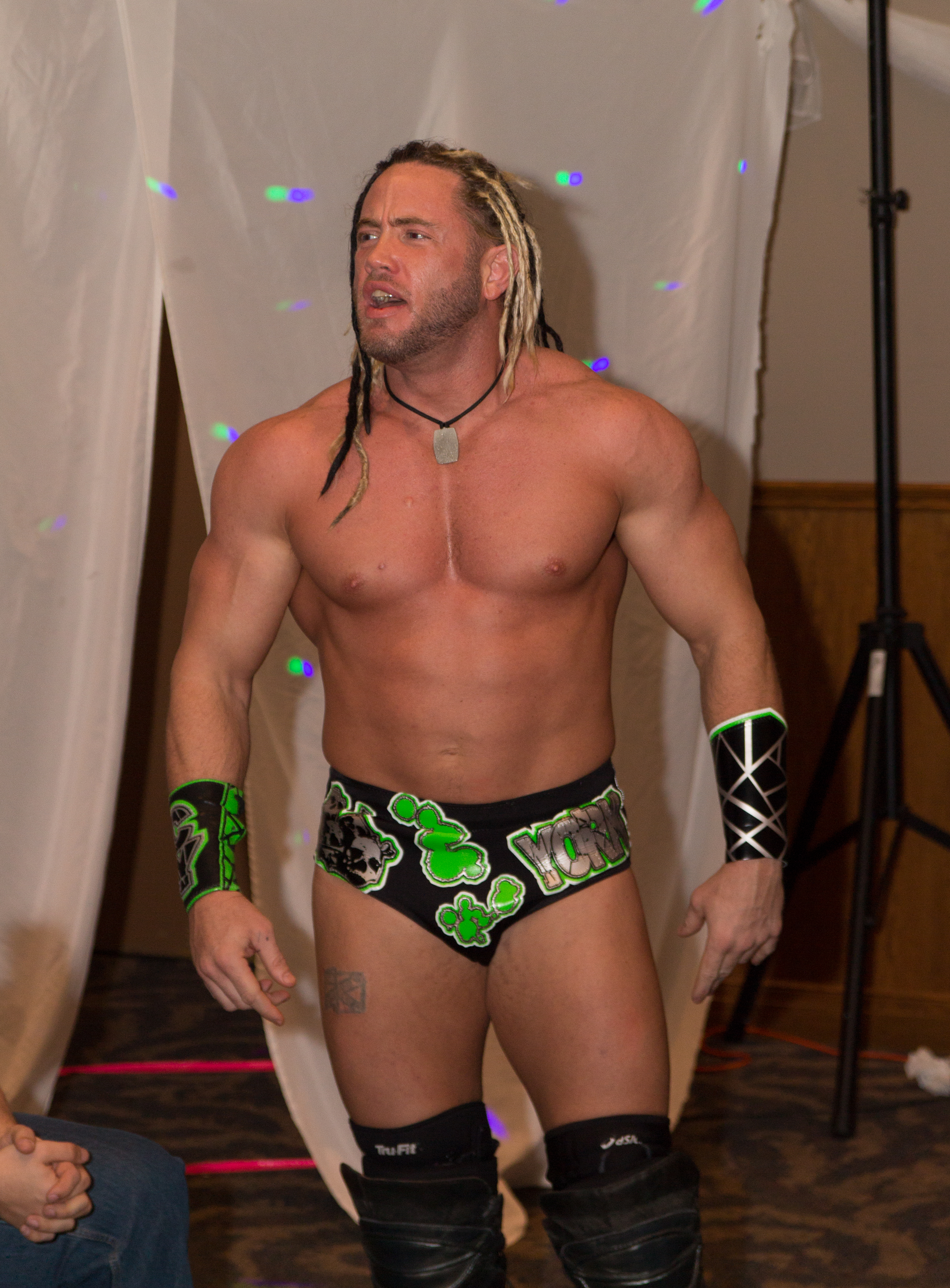
Christian York

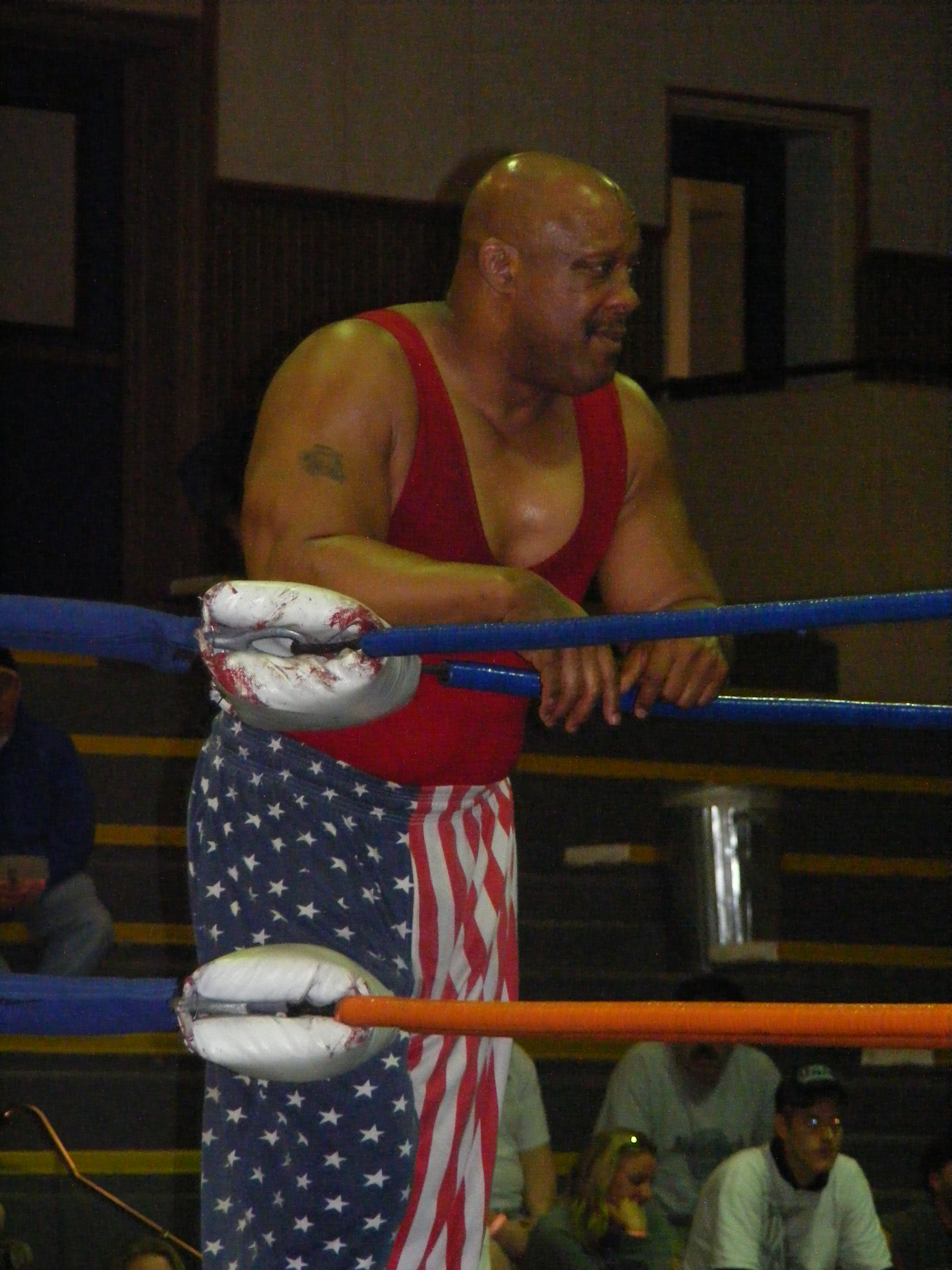
Tony Atlas

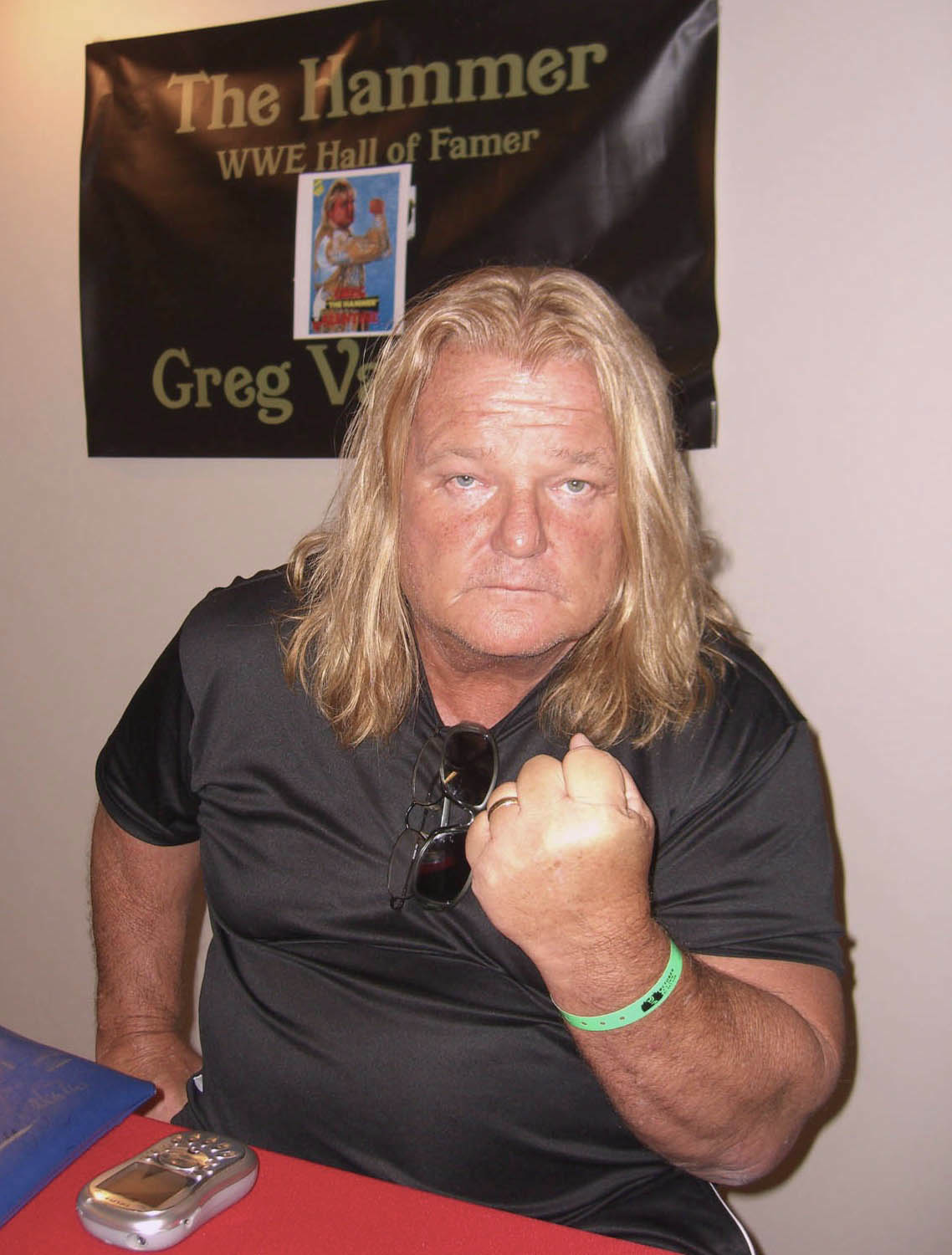
Greg Valentine

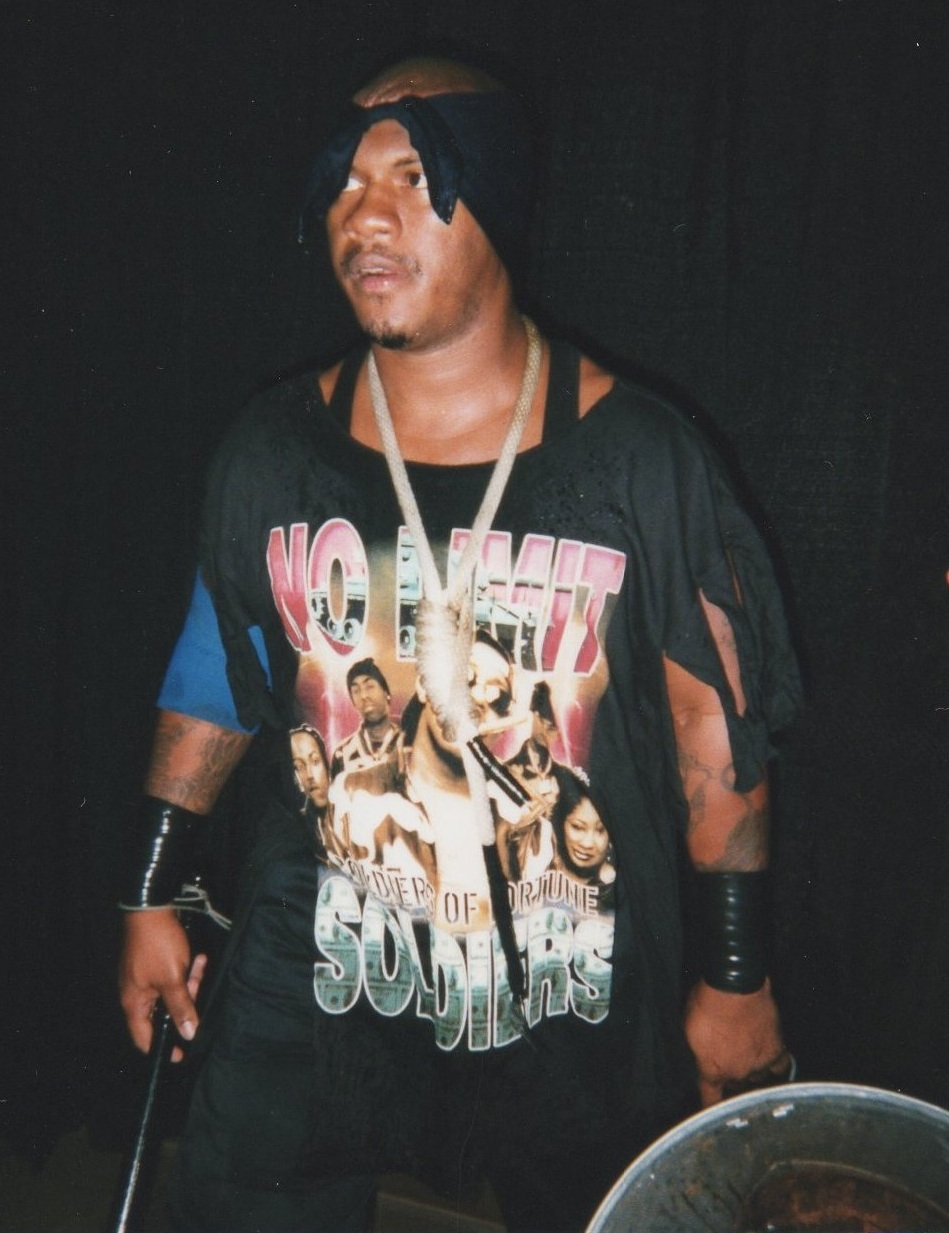
New Jack

=== Male wrestlers ===
Birth name:	Ring name(s):	Tenure:	Notes
Mike Alegado	King Kaluha	1995; 1997	
Lloyd Anoaʻi	L.A. Smooth	1997	
Matthew Anoaʻi^{†}	Matty Smalls	1996–1997	
Samula Anoaʻi	Samu / Sammy Silk	1995–1997; 1998	
Ray Apollo	Doink the Clown	1996–1997	
Robert Backlund	Bob Backlund	1997	
Douglas Becker	Adam Flash / Kabuki Kid / Tyler Martin	1992; 1994–1997; 2003	
James Bednarski	Scott Putski / Konnan 2000	1997	
Quentin Bell	Bubba Monroe	1991	
Nicholas Berk	Nick Berk	2001–2002	
Retesh Bhalla	Sonjay Dutt	2002	
Scott Bigelow ^{†}	Bam Bam Bigelow	1996–1997	
Adam Birch	Joey Matthews	1996–1997; 2003	
William Perry Blake III	Ricky Blues / Watsumi the Rising Sun	1991–1996; 2000–2002	
Tully Blanchard	Tully Blanchard	1997	
Tom Boric	Paul Diamond / Kato / Max Moon	1993; 1995	
Matt Bowman	Jimmy Cicero	1996–1997	
Tom Brandi	Johnny Gunn / Salvatore Sincere / Tom Brandi / The Patriot	1991; 1993; 1995–1998; 2000; 2002	
Terry Brunk	Sabu	1993; 1997	
Mike Bucci	Super Nova / Hollywood Nova	1996–1997	
Timothy Burke^{†}	Lucifer / Lucifer the Knight of the Road / Slick 50	1991–1998; 2000–2003	
Tommy Cairo	Tommy Cairo	1995	
Chris Candido^{†}	Chris Candido	1992–1993; 1996–1997	
R.J. Carrington^{†}	Reggie Carrington / The Bruiser	1997; 2004	
Joseph Carter	Joe Thunder	1992–1998; 2001–2002	
Tom Carter	Reckless Youth	2003–2004	
James Carullo	Gino Caruso	1995; 1997–1998	
David Cash	The Crow / David Jericho	1995; 1997	
Christopher Chetti	Chris Chetti	2003; 2004	
Bryan Clark	Adam Bomb	1995	
Steve Corino	Steve Corino	1996–1998	
Anthony Cramasta	Twiggy Ramirez	1997	
John Czawlytko^{†}	Maxx Muscle	2000	
Christopher Davis	Hurricane Kid	2000–2002	
Harry Del Rios	Spellbinder	1996	
William DeMott	Crash the Terminator	1995	
David DiMeglio^{†}	Dave Casanova / Dino Casanova	1991–1996; 2000; 2002–2003	
Michael Droese	Duke Droese	1996	
James Duggan Jr.	Jim Duggan	1995; 2000	
Anthony Durante ^{†}	Pitbull #2	1997	
Michael Durham ^{†}	Johnny Grunge	1993	
Ulualoaiga Emelio^{†}	Cocoa Samoa	1996–1997	
William Ensor^{†}	Buddy Landel	1997	
Wayne Farris	Honky Tonk Man	1992; 1998–1999	
Solofa Fatu Jr.	Fatu	1998	
David Ferrier ^{†}	Jimmy Del Ray	1994	
Mick Foley	Cactus Jack	1994–1995	
Christopher Ford	Devon Storm	1995–1997	
Nelson Frazier, Jr.^{†}	Mabel	1996; 1998	
Mark Freer^{†}	A. C. Golden / Golden Phoenix	1991–1993; 1998	
Jim Fullington	The Sandman	1997; 2002	
Sidney Garrison	Rip Sawyer	1991–1993	
Derek Gatton ^{†}	Derek Wayne	2001–2003	
Thomas Gilbert Jr.	Eddie Gilbert	1992–1993	
Glenn Gilbertti	Disco Inferno	1997	
Duane Gill	Gillberg / Duane Gill / Executioner #1 / Pain	1991–1994; 1998; 2003	
Danny Gimondo	Inferno Kid	1995; 1997	
Barry Hardy	Executioner #2 / Agony	1991; 1998	
James Harris^{†}	Kamala	1994	
Warren Harris	2-Dope	2003–2004	
Charles Hart	Earl the Pearl / Earl Hart / Private Pain / Dr. Pain / The Middlesex Mutant	1995–1997; 2003	
Donald Haviland^{†}	Hack Meyers	1993; 1995–1996; 2001–2002	
David Heath	Vampire Warrior / Gangrel	1995; 1997; 2003	
Michael Hegstrand ^{†}	Road Warrior Hawk	1994	
Brian Heffron	The Blue Meanie / Da Blue Guy / Bluedust / Brian Rollins	1995–1997	
Mark Hildreth	Van Hammer	2000; 2003	
Randy Hill	Steve Camry / The Natural	2000–2002	
Barry Horowitz	Barry Horowitz	2002	
Brian Howser ^{†}	Shane Shamrock	1994–1997	
Curtis Hughes	Mr. Hughes	1993; 1995	
Frank Huguelet	Rick Savage	1993	
Chris Jackson	Cueball Carmichael	1996–1997	
Fredrick Jannetty	Marty Jannetty	1995	
Jimmy Jannetty	Jimmy Jannetty	1992–1998	
Michael Jones	Virgil	1995–1996	
Michael Kehner	Kid America	1998	
Jake Kemmerer	Bad Crew #1 / Dog	1995–1998	
John Kereczman	John Rambo	1997	
Ronald Knight	Jason Knight	1996–1997	
Brian Knighton^{†}	Axl Rotten	1991–1997	
Tommy Lapeer	Death Dealer	2000	
Tom Laughlin	Tommy Dreamer	1992–1993	
Edward Leslie	Brutus Beefcake	1994–1996	
Scott Levy	Raven / Johnny Polo / Scotty Flamingo	1994–1997	
Phil Livelsberger	Max Thrasher	1991–1994; 2000–2002	
Michael Lockwood^{†}	Crash Holly	2003	
Mark LoMonaco	The Terminator	1993	
Joseph Magliano ^{†}	Joey Maggs	1997	
James Manley	Jim Powers	1995–1996	
Michael Manna	Stevie Richards / Big Stevie Cool	1996–1997	
Michael Maraldo	Ace Darling	1997	
Claude Marrow	Ruckus	2000–2001	
Pablo Marquez	Pablo Marquez	1996–1997	
Troy Martin	Shane Douglas	1995–1996	
Tony Matteo	Tony Stetson	1993	
Dan McDevitt	Corporal Punishment / The Comet / The Ultimate Comet	1993–1997	
Jack McDonald^{†}	Big Slam Vader	1996	
Michael Mendonca	Harley Lewis	1997–1998	
Butch Miller	Bushwhacker Butch	1995	
Jeff Miller	The Metal Maniac	1995–1998	
Leroy Miller^{‡}	DOA	2000	
Daniel Morrison	Danny Doring	2003–2004	
Ricky Morton	Ricky Morton	1997	
William Myers^{†}	George Steele	1997–1998	
Jim Neidhart^{†}	Jim Neidhart	1995–1996	
Paul Olsek, Jr.	Bad Crew #2 / Rose	1995–1998	
Matt Osborne^{†}	Doink the Clown	1994	
Glen Osbourne	Glen Osbourne	1995–1996; 1998; 2000	
Fred Ottman	Typhoon	1995	
Chris Pallies^{†}	King Kong Bundy	1995–1997	
Oreal Perras^{†}	Ivan Koloff	1992	
Josip Peruzović^{†}	Nikolai Volkoff	1992–1998	
A. J. Petrucci	A.J. Fritzoid / A.J. Petrucci / Darkside Demon #1	1991–1993; 1997–1998	
Ted Petty ^{†}	Rocco Rock / The Cheetah Kid	1993; 1997	
Al Poling	Sledgehammer McGill / 911	1993; 1997	
Tom Prichard	Tom Prichard	1994	
Jamin Pugh ^{†}	Jay Briscoe	2003	
Jonathan Rechner^{†}	Balls Mahoney / Boo Bradley / Abuddah Singh	1996–1997	
James Reiher^{†}	Jimmy Snuka	1993; 1995–1998	
Billy Reil	Billy Reil	1998	
Sylvester Ritter ^{†}	Junkyard Dog	1993	
Glen Ruth	Headbanger Thrasher / Spider	1992; 1996–1997; 2003	
Charles Scaggs	Too Cold Scorpio	1994–1995	
Mark Shrader	Mark Shrader / Mark Schrader / Joe College	1993–1997	
Joseph Scarpa Jr.^{†}	Vince Young	1993	
Peter Senerchia	The Tazmaniac	1993	
Dan Severn	Dan Severn	1995	
Mike Sharpe, Jr.^{†}	Iron Mike Sharpe	1992–1993; 1996–1997	
Mike Shaw^{†}	Bastion Booger	1995	
Chad Slivenski	Chad Austin / Chad Bowman / Pat Patterson Jr.	1993–1998; 2002–2004	
Aurelian Smith Jr.	Jake Roberts	1993; 1997	
Eugene Snisky	Darkside Demon #2	1997–1998	
Merced Solis	Tito Santana	1996	
Lester Speight	Rasta the Voodoo Man	1992–1993	
Jason Spence	Christian York	1997; 2003	
Robert Starr	Bob Starr / The Russian Assassin	1991–2002	
Kevin Sullivan	Kevin Sullivan	1993	
Terry Szopinski	The Warlord	1994	
Patrick Tanaka	Pat Tanaka	1993	
John Tenta ^{†}	Golga	1998	
Sione Vailahi	The Barbarian	1995	
Hossein Vaziri ^{†}	The Iron Sheik	1995–1996	
Kevin Wacholz	Nailz	1994	
Sean Waltman	The Lightning Kid	1992–1993	
Charles Warrington	Headbanger Mosh	1996–1997	
Morgus Watson	Morgus the Maniac	1991–1996; 1998; 2000–2002	
Johnny Weiss	Johnny Hotbody	1993	
Lawrence Whistler	Larry Zbyszko	2002	
Anthony White	Tony Atlas	1996	
Brian Wickens	Bushwhacker Luke	1995	
Billy Wiles	Bill Wiles	1996	
Chuck Williams^{†}	Rockin' Rebel	1995–1997	
John Williams	Ian Rotten	1993	
Darren Wise	Darren Wyse	1998	
Jonathan Wisniski	Greg Valentine	1993–1996; 1998	
Brian Wohl	Julio Sanchez	1996–1997	
Gary Wolfe	Pitbull #1	1997	
Jerome Young^{†}	New Jack	1997	
Unknown	Adrian Chambers / Aidan Chambers / Aden Chambers	2003–2004	
Unknown	Adrian Hall	1991–1993; 1995; 1997	
Dennis Dean	Agent Orange/The Original Corp. Punishment/Blu Billion	1992–1993; 1998; 2000–2002	
Unknown	Alex Lunar / Lunar	2001–2004	
Unknown	The American Ninja	1993; 1995	
Unknown	Andrew Ryker	2001–2004	
Unknown	The Bonzai Warrior	1995	
Unknown	Bad Billy Bratt	1994–1995	
Unknown	Blood	2000–2002	
Unknown	Bodacious Pretty Boy / El Loco Uno	1995–1998	
Unknown	Christopher Annino aka Rescue 911	2004	
Unknown	The Booty Man / The Bootie Man	1996	
Unknown	Brett Tyler	1993	
Unknown	Brock Singleton	2003	
Unknown	Buck Child / Buckchyld	2002–2004	
Unknown	Bulldozer Benton	1993–1995	
Unknown	Buster Maccabi	2001–2002	
Unknown	Buzz Stryker	2000–2003	
Dennis Dean	Carnage	2001	
Unknown	The Cat Burglar	1994–1998; 2000–2002	
Unknown	C.C. Danger	1993	
Unknown	Chef D.Z. Gillespie	1998	
Unknown	Chicken Neck	1994–1995	
Unknown	Clubber Lang / Ralph Soto	1996	
Unknown	Colossal Kong	1993–1994	
Unknown	Cowboy Cody Daniels	1998	
Unknown	Damien Kane	1995–1996	
Unknown	Damian Stone	1995	
Unknown	Danny Rose	1996; 1998	
Unknown	Dave Zanwich / Knuckles Zanwich	1995–1997; 2002	
Unknown	Derek Domino	1997–1998	
Unknown	Derek Frazier	2001–2002	
Unknown	Dino Devine	2003–2004	
Unknown	The Dirty Dog	1997	
Unknown	Doug Delicious	2003	
Unknown	D.P. Ferguson	1995	
Unknown	Drew Pain	2001–2002	
Unknown	Eagle	2001–2004	
Unknown	Ed the Razor	1993	
Unknown	Eddie Chambers	2003	
Unknown	Flexx Wheeler	1998–2000	
Unknown	Forty Ounce Ferguson	1997	
Unknown	Freak Show	2000	
Unknown	G-Dawg	2002–2004	
Unknown	Genesis	2003–2004	
Unknown	Ham	2004	
Unknown	Jack Adonis	1997	
Unknown	Jackhammer Benton	1995	
Unknown	Jay Sledge	1993	
Unknown	Jeff Rocker	2002	
Unknown	Jim Christian	2000–2001	
Unknown	Johnny Blaze	1992–1993	
Unknown	Johnny Desire / Imposter Earl The Pearl	1996–1997	
Unknown	Johnny Graham	1995	
Unknown	Johnny Handsome	1995	
Unknown	Johnny Paradise	1993–1994; 1996–1997	
Unknown	Johnny Taylor	1994–1997	
Unknown	Jonathan Luvstruck	1998	
Unknown	J.R. Willet	1994–1995	
Unknown	Ken Basta	1994–1995	
Unknown	Kenshiro	2000–2002	
Unknown	Kirk Dredd	1992	
Unknown	L.A. Royale	1997	
Unknown	Mad Dog O'Malley	1993–1997; 2000–2002	
Unknown	Mark Osborne	1993	
Unknown	Mike Khoury / Michael Sweet	1993–1996	
Unknown	Mike Parker	1993	
Unknown	Mr. Destiny	1994–1995; 1998; 2000–2001	
Unknown	Nick Tarentino	1991–1993	
Unknown	Nick "The Constrictor" Oxendine	2000	
Unknown	The Ninja Warrior	1998	
Unknown	Odessa Royale	1997	
Unknown	O'Dog	2000	
Unknown	Otto Schtark	1997; 2000; 2002	
Unknown	Patch	2000	
Unknown	Pico Sanchez	2002–2003	
Unknown	Pinky the Flamingo Kid / Pinky Flamingo	1995; 1997–1998	
Unknown	The Pitfighter	1997–1998	
Unknown	Psycho Gangsta	2001	
Unknown	Qenaan Creed	2003–2004	
Unknown	Quinn Nash	1992–1997	
Unknown	Ramblin' Rich / Rich Myers / Rich Carlisle	1991–1998; 2003	
Unknown	Rayne	2000–2002	
Unknown	Reggie Royce	1993	
Unknown	Ricky Lane / Ricki Lane	1992–1993; 1995	
Unknown	Rob Noxious	1995	
Unknown	Romeo Valentino	1992–1996; 2000; 2003–2004	
Unknown	Sean Patrick / Shawn Patrick	2003–2004	
Unknown	Sebastian Coverdale / Madman Sam	2001–2003	
Unknown	Shane Golden	2000	
Unknown	Sideswype	2003–2004	
Unknown	Smokey Myavia	1999–2000	
Unknown	The Somalian Warrior	1993	
Unknown	Sonny Black	1997	
Unknown	Spaz	1998	
Unknown	Steve McMillan	1995	
Unknown	Stevie Riggs	2001–2002	
Unknown	Suicide	2002–2004	
Unknown	Sweet Daddy Jay Love	1998	
Unknown	Sweet Georgie Love / George Anthony	1998	
Unknown	Switchblade	1997–1998	
Unknown	Tai Smiley / Tay Smiley	2002	
Unknown	T-Bone	1993	
Unknown	T-Bone Strong	1993	
Unknown	Thomas Rodman	1996–1997	
Unknown	Tommy Hawk / Slash	1997–1998; 2000–2001	
Unknown	Tommy Lee Manson	1993	
Unknown	Tony Hightower	2000	
Unknown	Travis D	2002	
Unknown	Travis Finity	2003–2004	
Unknown	Trent Young	1993; 1997	
Unknown	Venom	1997	
Unknown	Whiplash	2000	
Unknown	The Wolfman	1993–1994	
Unknown	World's Greatest Wrestling Clown	1995	
Unknown	Yet Another Wrestling Clown	1995; 1997	
Unknown	Zoltar the Wolfman	1992–1993	

=== Female wrestlers ===
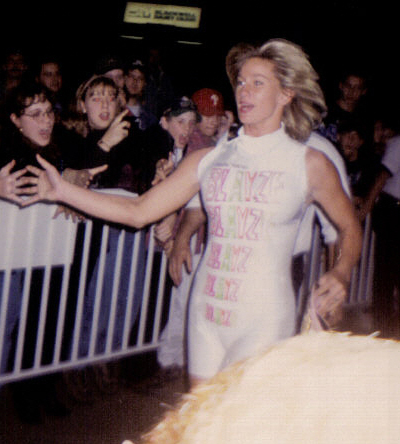
Alundra Blayze

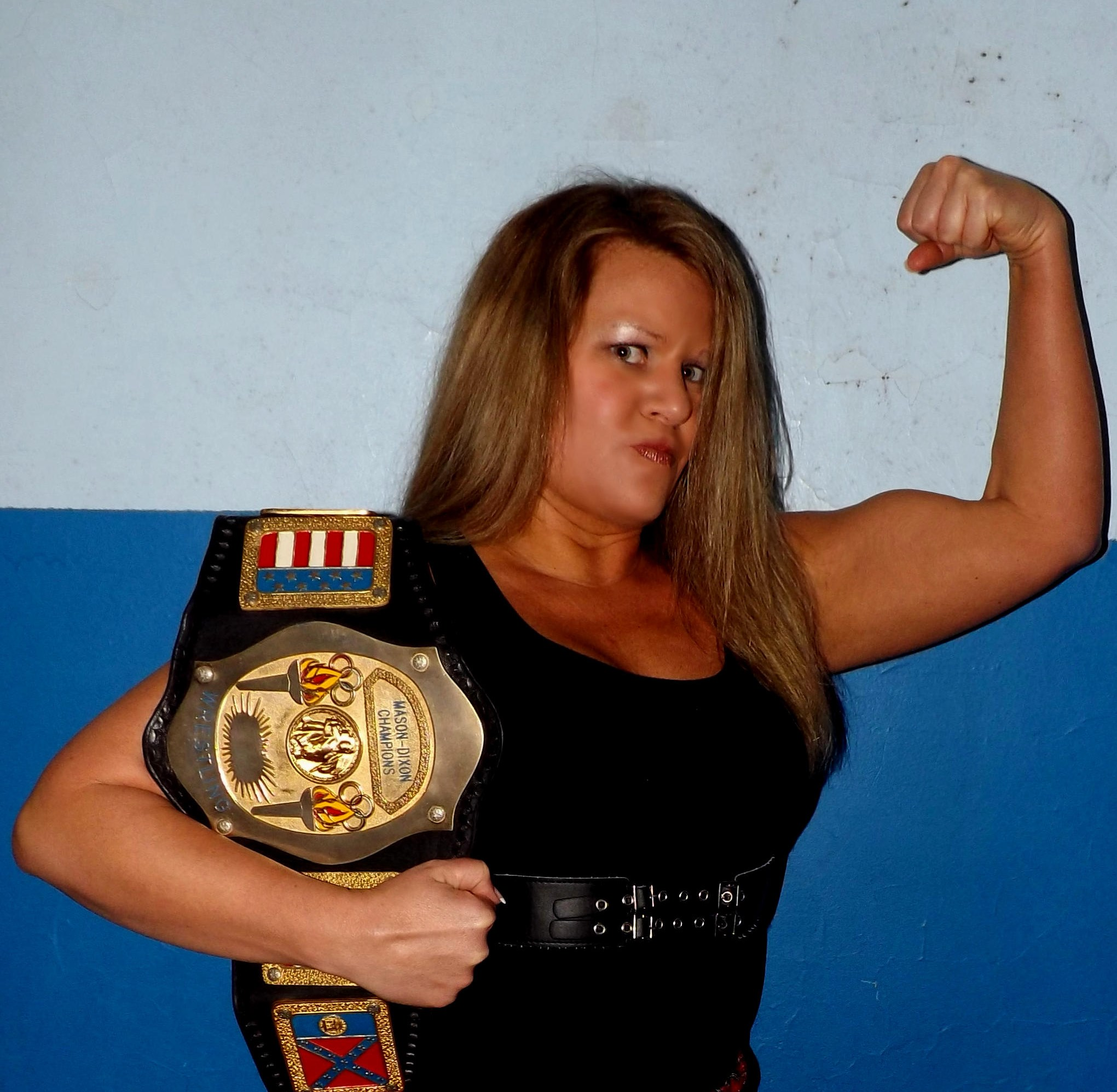
Fantasia

Birth name:	Ring name(s):	Tenure:	Notes
Malia Hosaka	Malia Hosaka	1995–1998	
Mickie James	Alexis Laree	2003	
Peggy Lee^{†}	Peggy Lee Leather	1995	
Debra Lewandowski	Madusa	1993	
Selina Majors	Bambi	1995	
Heidi Lee Morgan	Heidi Lee Morgan	1992	
Karen Simpson	Fantasia / Karen Simpson	1994–1995; 1997	
Debbie Szostecki	Debbie Combs	1998	
Gertrude Vachon^{†}	Luna Vachon	1995	
Unknown	Blaze	1997	
Unknown	The Cycle Queen	1994	
Unknown	Nasty Angel	1993–1994	
Unknown	Rusty "The Fox" Thomas	1992	

=== Midget wrestlers ===
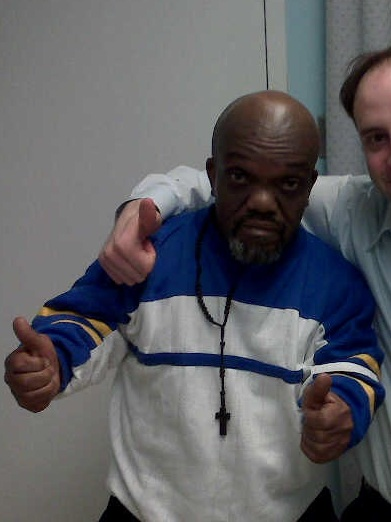
Haiti Kid

Birth name:	Ring name(s):	Tenure:	Notes
Steve Eisenhower	Butch Cassidy	1992	
Claude Giroux	Dink	1994; 1997	
Raymond Kessler	The Haiti Kid	1992	
Louis Waterhouse Jr.	Little Louie	1995–1997	
Unknown	King Sleazy	1995; 1997	
Unknown	The Leprechaun / The Irish Leprechaun	1994	
Unknown	Little Hercules	1993; 1997	
Unknown	Little Ninja	1994	
Unknown	Mighty Doom	1993	

=== Stables and tag teams ===
Tag team/Stable(s)	Members	Tenure(s)
The American Idols		2002; 2003–2004
The American Nightmares	Ham and Bone	2004
The Bad Breed	Axl Rotten and Ian Rotten	1993
The Bad Crew	Dog and Rose	1995–1998
The Bad Street Boys	Joey Matthews and Christian York	1997
Badd Company	Pat Tanaka and Paul Diamond	1993
BET	Derick Delight and Eric Envy	2003
The Big Dogs	Steve McMillan and Mad Dog O'Malley	1995
Black & Blue	Flexx Wheeler and Ricky Blues	1999
The Blue World Order	Big Stevie Cool, Da Blue Guy and Hollywood Nova	1997
Brand X	G-Dawg and Buckchyld	2003–2004
The Bushwhackers	Bushwhacker Butch and Bushwhacker Luke	1995
Camp Candie	The Bruiser and Suicide	2003–2004
Chain Gang	Spaz and Slash	1998
The Cracker Express	Sandy Saltine, Richie Ritz, Sunshine, Krispy and Nabisco Dimico	2003–2004
Cream Team	Dino Casanova and Rip Sawyer	1991–1992
Darkside	Glen Osbourne and Rockin' Rebel	1996
The Darkside Demons	Darkside Demon #1 and Darkside Demon #2	1997–1998
Dog Pound	Odessa Royale and L.A. Royale	1997
The Executioners	Executioner #1 and Executioner #2	1998
The Extremists	Devon Storm and Ace Darling	1997
The Family	Corporal Punishment, Axl Rotten and The Headbangers	1996
The Freak Show	Blood and Carnage	2000–2001
The Ghetto Mafia	2-Dope and Sideswype	2003–2004
The Good, The Bad And The Ugly		2000
The Goodfellows	Dino Casanova and Romeo Valentino	1993–1995; 2000
The Headshrinkers	Fatu and Samu	1998
The Knights of the Road	Lucifer and Switchblade	1998
Leather & Lace	Rich Carlisle and Adrian Hall	1992–1995
The Lords of Darkness	Pain and Agony	1991–1992
Los Tres Amigos	Slick 50, Pico Sanchez and Swaniaki	2003
The Love Connection	Sweet Daddy Jay Love and Sweet Georgie Love	1998
The Headbangers	Headbanger Mosh and Headbanger Thrasher	1996–1997
The Hollywood Hunks	Lucifer and Bob Starr	1994; 2000–2001
Hollywood Inc.	Bob Starr, Brock Singleton and Genesis	2003–2004
The Holy Rollers	Earl the Pearl and Rich Meyers	2003
The KPA	Joe Thunder and Steve Camry	2002
The Malaysian Militia	Kabuki Kid and The Bonzai Warrior	1994
Marvelous Inc.	Jimmy Jannetty and Rich Myers	1998
Mason Dixon	J.R. Willet and Bulldozer Benton	1995
Menace 2 Society	Adam Flash, Romeo Valentino and Quinn Nash	1996
The Misfits	Harley Lewis and Derek Domino	1997–1998
Models Inc.	Michael Sweet and Johnny Handsome	1995
The Outrageous Ones	Riki Lane and Quinn Nash	1993–1994
The Pitbulls	Pitbull#1 and Pitbull#2	1997
The Samoan Gangsta Tribe	Matty Smalls and Coco Samoa	1996
The Samoan Gangsta Tribe	Matty Smalls and L.A. Smooth	1997
The Shooters	Bob Starr, Joe Thunder, Mad Dog O'Malley, Barry Casino and Stud Lee Osborne	1998
Simply Delusional	Alex Lunar and Eagle	2003–2004
The Slackers	Chad Bowman and Dino Devine	2003–2004
Sonic Express	Ricky Blues and Nick Tarantino	1992–1993
The Sons of Satan	Son of Satan I and Son of Satan II	1994
Southern Destruction	Southern Destruction I and Southern Destruction II	1993
Stud Lee's Stable	Corporal Punishment, Chad Austin and Gen. Stud Lee	1995
Sweet and Sour	Rob Knoxious and Johnny Graham	1995
Team Punishment	Corporal Punishment, Derek Wayne and Buzz Stryker	2003
The Tokyo Terrors	Kenshiro and Watsumi	2000–2002
The Underground	Sebastian Coverdale, Alex Lunar, Gothic and Demonica	2003
Yet Another Pair Of Wrestling Clowns	Wrestling Clown #1 and Wrestling Clown #2	1995

=== Managers and valets ===
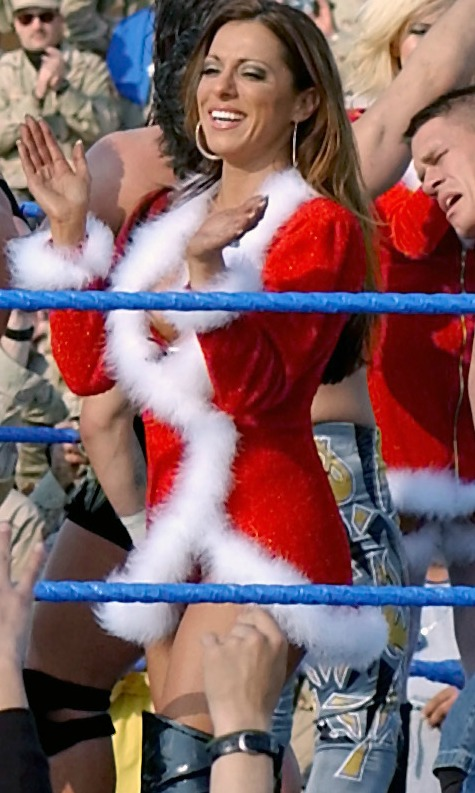
Dawn Psaltis

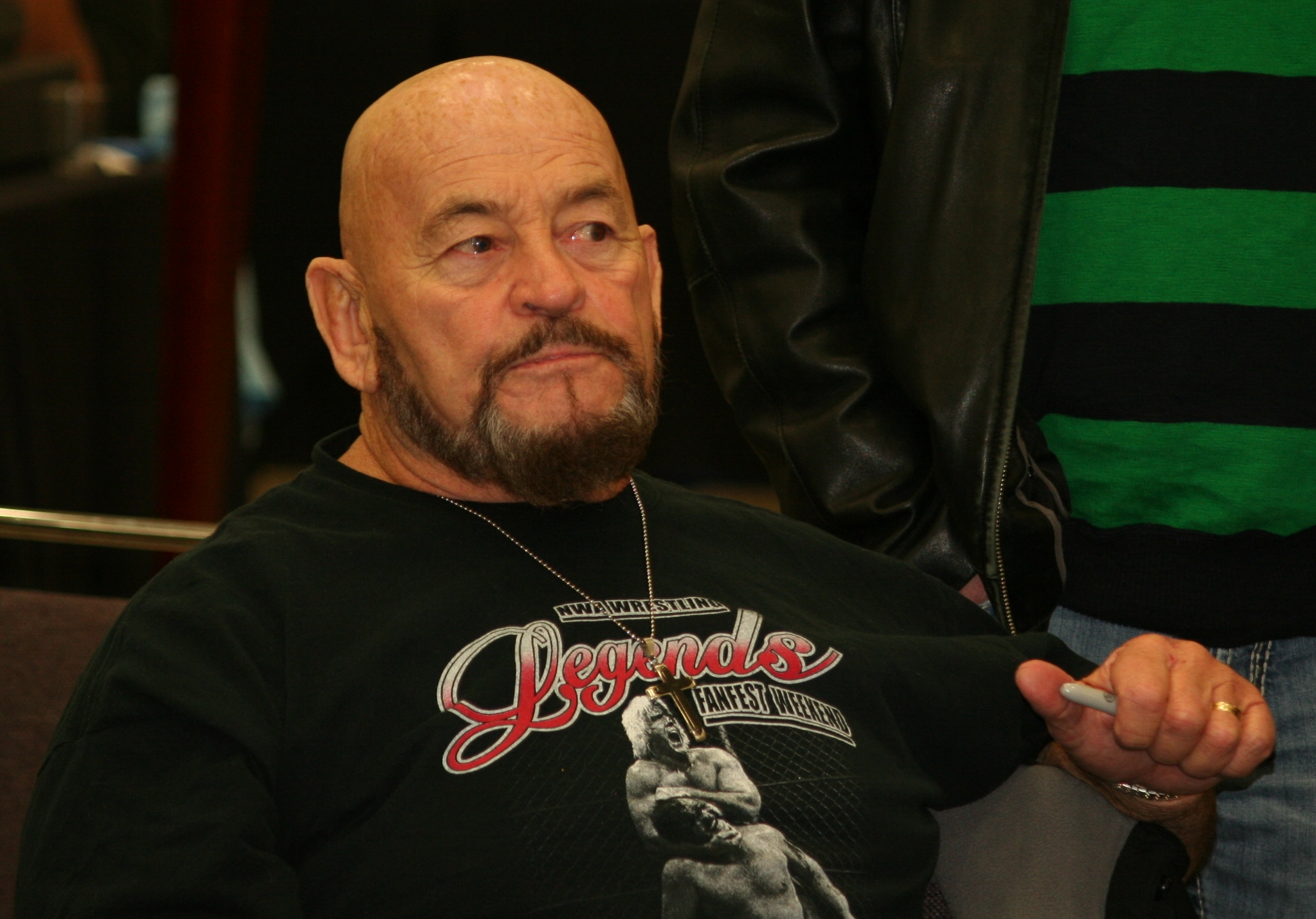
Ivan Koloff

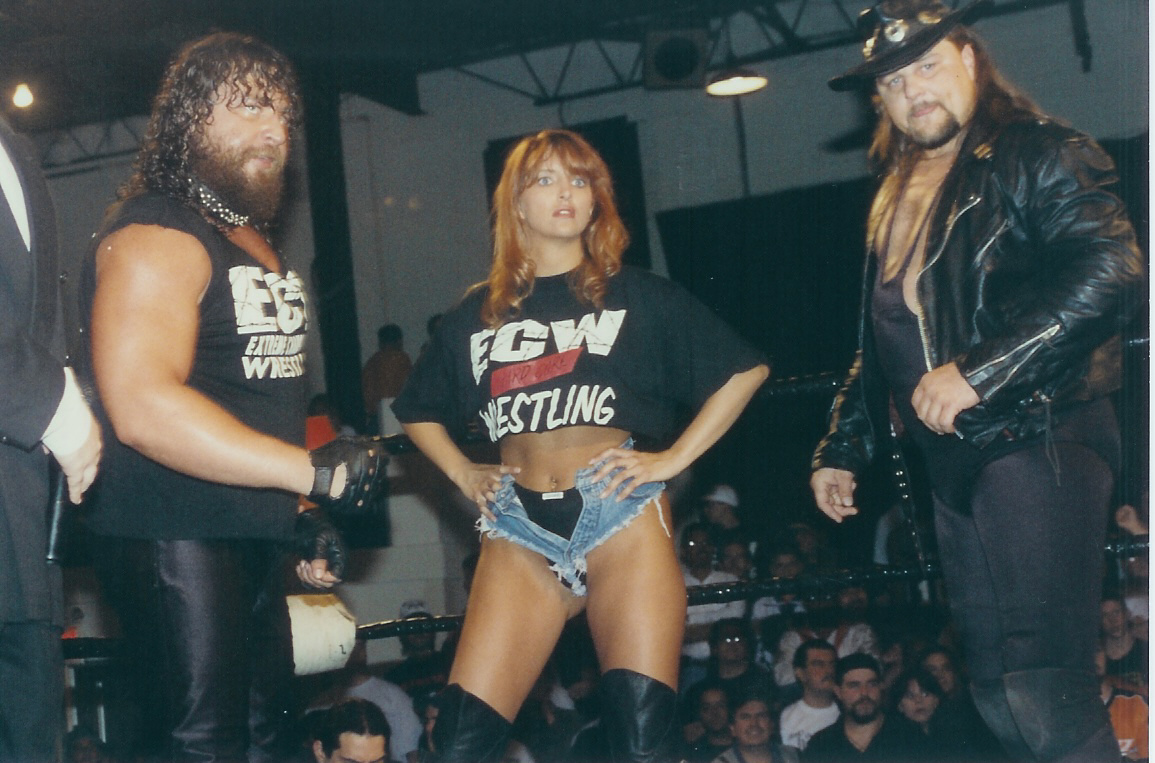
Damien Kane (left) and Lady Alexandria

Birth name:	Ring name(s):	Tenure:	Notes
Tom Cusati	Royce C. Prophet	1995–1997	
Lou D'Angeli	Sign Guy Dudley	1995	
Nathaniel Forgotson	Platinum Nat Forge	1997	
Melissa Hiatt	Missy Hyatt	1997; 1999	
Robin Hunt	Hunter Q. Robbins III	1998	
Jeff Jones	Judge Jeff Jones	1995–1996	
Carl Murray	Dr. Blasphemy	2003–2004	
Oreal Perras^{†}	Ivan Koloff	1997	
Dawn Psaltis	Dawn Marie	1997	
Unknown	Al Bino	1997	
Unknown	Angela	2002–2004	
Unknown	Barry Casino	1998	
Unknown	Brittany Bosoms	1996–1997	
Unknown	Candie	2002–2003	
Unknown	Demonica	2003	
Unknown	Destiny	1998	
Unknown	Ginger Lynn Lucas	1996–1997	
Unknown	Hurricane Kelly	1995	
Unknown	Isis	1995–1998	
Unknown	Joe Cool	1995	
Unknown	Kayla	2004	
Unknown	Lady Alexandria	1996	
Unknown	Lady Jenna	2000	
Unknown	Lana	2004	
Unknown	Medic Maurice / Orderly Maurice	1995; 1998; 2000	
Unknown	Miss Courtney	1997	
Unknown	Miss Patricia	1997	
Unknown	"Marvelous" Mitzi Million	1998	
Unknown	Naughty Nichole	2003–2004	
Unknown	Nikita Brezhnikoff	1997–1998; 2000	
Unknown	Nurse Grace	1995; 1998; 2000	
Unknown	Sambucca	2000	
Unknown	Sasha	2003	
Unknown	Simply Lucious	2004	
Mark Osborne	Gen. Stud Lee / Gen. / Stud Lee Osborne	1995–1996	

=== Commentators and interviewers ===
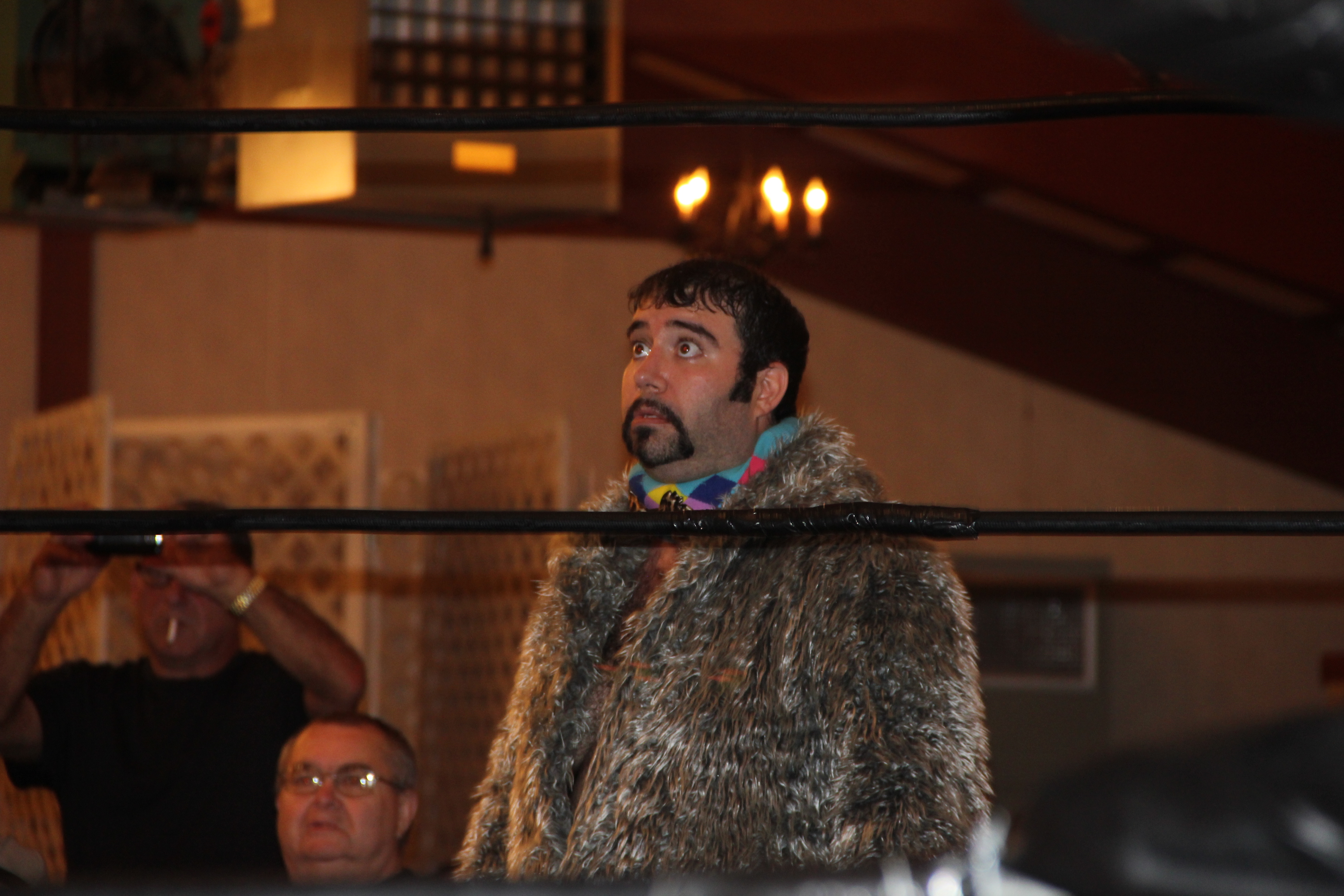
Joel Gertner

Birth name:	Ring name(s):	Tenure:	Notes
Joel Gertner	Joel Gertner	1997	Ring announcer
Unknown	Al Albert	1996–1997	Ring announcer
Unknown	Handsome Howard Goldman	2000	Ring announcer
Unknown	Kevin Carson	1997	
Unknown	Ron Young	1996	
Unknown	Stud Lee / Stud Lee Osborne	1995–1996	
Unknown	Vinnie Gambini	1997	Ring announcer

=== Referees ===
Birth name:	Ring name(s):	Tenure:	Notes
Earl Hart	Earl Hart	1997	
Jeff Jones	Judge Jeff Jones	1992–1995	
Tonya Stevens	Tonya Stevens	1998; 2000	
Unknown	Barry Roberts	1998–1999	
Unknown	Dave the Wave	1995–1999	
Unknown	Howard Goldman / Rick Reed / Peter North	1996–1997	
Unknown	Mike Lehner	1996	
Unknown	Scott Stater	1998–2000	

=== Other personnel ===
Birth name:	Ring name(s):	Tenure:	Notes
Jeff Amdur	Jeff Amdur	1995–1998	Timekeeper
Donna Burke	Donna Burke	2002–2004	Promoter
Tim Burke^{†}	Tim Burke	1991–2002	Promoter
Randy Hill	Randy Hill	2000	Promoter; MEWF Commissioner
Dennis Wippercht	Dennis Wippercht	1991–2002	Promoter
Unknown	Michael Murphy	2003–2004	MEWF Commissioner
Unknown	Tom Kanaras	1996	MEWF Commissioner

Notes
^{†} Indicates they are deceased.
^{‡} Indicates they died while they were employed with the Mid-Eastern Wrestling Federation.
^{MCW} Indicates they were part of a talent exchange with Maryland Championship Wrestling.
