= HoPWF Cruiserweight Championship =

Professional wrestling championship

Details
- Promotion: House of Pain Wrestling Federation
- Date established: December 23, 1997
- Current champion(s): Vacant
Statistics
- First champion(s): The Perfect Champion
- Most reigns: Jimmy Jessup (6)
- Longest reign: Mr. V.I.P. Viper (391 days)
- Shortest reign: Doken (3 days)

The HoPWF Cruiserweight Championship is the top professional wrestling Cruiserweight title in the House of Pain Wrestling Federation promotion. It was created on December 23, 1997, when The Perfect Champion defeated Fumar in Hagerstown, Maryland. The title is defended primarily in the Mid-Atlantic and East Coast, most often in Maryland, but also Pennsylvania and West Virginia. There are 29 recognized known champions with a total of 54 title reigns.

== Title history ==
| Wrestler: | Times: | Date: | Location: | Notes: |
|---|---|---|---|---|
| The Perfect Champion | 1 | December 23, 1997 | Hagerstown, Maryland | Defeated Fumar to become first champion. |
The title is vacated in 1998.
| Latin Lover | 1 | April 8, 1998 | | Defeated Yutzak Arafat to win the vacant title. |
| Blackhawk | 1 | June 30, 1998 | | |
| Mike Lawson | 1 | September 8, 1998 | | |
| Fumar | 1 | November 10, 1998 | | Awarded title via forfeit when Lawson fails to appear. |
| The New Jersey Devil | 1 | December 22, 1998 | | |
The title is vacated on March 25, 1999.
| Fantasia | 1 | May 25, 1999 | | Won title in battle royal. |
The title is vacated in August 1999.
| Hyjinx | 1 | August 24, 1999 | | Won tournament to win the vacant title. |
| Chuckie Manson | 1 | August 28, 1999 | | |
| OGB | 1 | October 31, 1999 | Hagerstown, Maryland | |
| The Doc | 1 | December 21, 1999 | Hagerstown, Maryland | |
| Hyjinx | 2 | March 21, 2000 | Hagerstown, Maryland | Won title in a Lumberjack Leather Strap match. |
| Jerkface | 1 | April 11, 2000 | | Awarded title via forfeit when Hyjinx fails to appear. |
| Hyjinx | 3 | May 9, 2000 | | Won title in a Parking Lot chain match. |
| The Doc | 2 | June 20, 2000 | | |
| Hyjinx | 4 | June 27, 2000 | Hagerstown, Maryland | |
| John Geesey | 1 | September 2, 2000 | Hagerstown, Maryland | |
| Jerkface | 2 | September 30, 2000 | | Defeated John Geesey, Ethan de Sade and Jimmy Jessup in four way dance. |
| OGB | 2 | November 14, 2000 | | Awarded title via forfeit after Jerkface failed to appear. |
| Flex Fenom | 1 | February 3, 2001 | Hagerstown, Maryland | Won in Best-of-3-Falls match. |
| Aidean | 1 | June 26, 2001 | Hagerstown, Maryland | |
| Flex Fenom | 2 | August 21, 2001 | Chambersberg, Pennsylvania | Defeated Aidean and Johny Dowe in Triple Threat match. Both the HoPWF and NWL Cruiserweight Championships were on the line. |
| Aidean | 2 | August 28, 2001 | | |
| Fumar | 2 | October 12, 2002 | Martinsburg, West Virginia | Defeated Aidean, Hyjinx and Bart Sawyer in a 4 Way Dance. |
| The Freak | 1 | November 18, 2002 | Hagerstown, Maryland | Defeated Hyjinx and Chuckie Manson in a three way dance. |
| Flex Fenom | 3 | December 7, 2002 | Greencastle, Pennsylvania | Defeated Fumar in a Tables and Chairs match. |
| Spiral | 1 | March 15, 2003 | Martinsburg, West Virginia | |
The title is vacated on April 26, 2003, when Spyral suffers an injury.
| Fumar | 3 | April 26, 2003 | Martinsburg, West Virginia | Defeated The Joker and Sam Sanders in a three-way match to win vacant title. |
| The Joker | 1 | May 24, 2003 | Blue Ridge Summit, Pennsylvania | |
The title is vacated on June 7, 2003, when Joker fails to appear for a scheduled title defense.
| Fumar | 4 | June 7, 2003 | Greencastle, Pennsylvania | Defeated Spyral, Dexter Alexander and Nomad in a three way match to win the vacant title. |
| Sam Sanders | 1 | June 21, 2003 | Martinsburg, West Virginia | Defeated Fumar, Spyral and Joker in a four corners Luchadore tables, ladders and chairs match. |
| Fumar | 5 | July 19, 2003 | Martinsburg, West Virginia | Defeated Sam Sanders and Spyral in a 3-way Luchadore match. |
| Jackpot Jimmy Jessup | 1 | September 6, 2003 | Martinsburg, West Virginia | Defeated Spyral, Fumar and Adam Chambers in a Four Way Dance. |
| Blackhawk | 2 | September 30, 2003 | Hagerstown, Maryland | Won title via forfeit. |
| Queenan Creed | 1 | October 18, 2003 | Gettysburg, Pennsylvania | |
The title is held up on November 1, 2003, when neither Creed or his opponent showed up for their scheduled match.
| Blackhawk | 3 | November 11, 2003 | Hagerstown, Maryland | Won title in Royal Rumble. |
| Hyjinx | 5 | January 6, 2004 | Hagerstown, Maryland | Awarded title via forfeit when Blackhawk failed to appear. |
| Jackpot Jimmy Jessup | 2 | February 21, 2004 | Martinsburg, West Virginia | |
| Dexter Alexander | 1 | June 5, 2004 | Hagerstown, Maryland | |
| Jackpot Jimmy Jessup | 3 | June 31, 2004 | Waynesboro, Pennsylvania | |
| Doken | 1 | August 31, 2004 | Hagerstown, Maryland | |
| Jackpot Jimmy Jessup | 4 | September 4, 2004 | Hagerstown, Maryland | |
The title is vacated on September 30, 2004, when Jimmy Jessup suffers a serious hernia.
| Eric Polaris | 1 | October 2, 2004 | Hagerstown, Maryland | Defeated Doken for the vacant title. |
| Doken | 2 | December 11, 2004 | Waynesboro, Pennsylvania | |
| Blackhawk | 4 | December 14, 2004 | Hagerstown, Maryland | Won title via forfeit when Doken failed to appear. |
| Brooklyn Panther | 1 | February 26, 2005 | Martinsburg, West Virginia | Defeated Blackhawk, Justin Idol and Brandon Day in a 4 Way Dance. |
The title is vacated on February 26, 2005, when Brooklyn Panther fails to appear for a scheduled title defense.
| Jackpot Jimmy Jessup | 5 | June 25, 2005 | Martinsburg, West Virginia | Defeated Asian Sinsation and Brandon Day in a 3-way match via countout to win the vacant title. |
| Brooklyn Panther | 2 | July 5, 2005 | Hagerstown, Maryland | |
| Jackpot Jimmy Jessup | 6 | July 19, 2005 | Hagerstown, Maryland | |
| The Freak | 1 | July 23, 2005 | Newville, Pennsylvania | Won title via forfeit when Jimmy Jessup failed to appear. |
The title is vacated on October 18, 2005, when The Freak is stripped for failing to appear for a scheduled title defense.
| Jeremy "Izzy" Stoned | 1 | October 18, 2005 | Hagerstown, Maryland | Pinned Jerkface to win the vacant title. |
| Mr. V.I.P. Viper | 1 | October 10, 2006 | Hagerstown, Maryland | |
| Brandon Scott | 1 | October 26, 2007 | Hagerstown, Maryland | Won title at the NWL/HoPWF Halloween Monster Mash supercard. |
| Mr. V.I.P. Viper | 2 | March 29, 2008 | | Defeated Brandon Scott, Jeremy Stoned and Blackhawk in a 4-way match. |
The title is vacated in 2008.
