= NWL Ladies Championship =

Professional wrestling women's championship

Details
- Promotion: National Wrestling League
- Date established: 1990
- Current champion(s): AmyLee
- Date won: May 18, 2008

Other name(s)
- NWL Women's Championship (1990-2003); NWL/HoPWF Ladies Championship (2005-2007)
Statistics
- First champion(s): Bambi
- Most reigns: Bambi (4)
- Longest reign: Fantasia (691 days)
- Shortest reign: AmyLee (25 days)

The NWL Ladies Championship is the top women's professional wrestling title in the National Wrestling League promotion. It was created when Bambi defeated Heidi Lee Morgan to become first champion in 1990. The title was defended primarily in the Mid-Atlantic and East Coast, most often in Hagerstown, Maryland, but also in Pennsylvania and West Virginia. It was originally retired in 2003, reinstated as the NWL/HoPWF Ladies Championship in 2005 and the NWL Ladies Championship in 2007. There were 12 recognized known champions with a total of 21 title reigns.

== Title history ==
Wrestler:	Times:	Date:	Location:	Notes:
NWL Women's Championship
Bambi	1	1990		Defeated Heidi Lee Morgan to become first champion.
Rusty Foxx	1	1991		
Bambi	2	1991		
Peggy Lee Leather	1	1991		
Rusty Foxx	2	1992		
Peggy Lee Leather	2	1992		Won title via forfeit.
Bambi	3	August 2, 1992	Hagerstown, Maryland	
Peggy Lee Leather	1	April 1993	Keyser, West Virginia	
Bambi	4	February 25, 1995	Onley, Virginia	
The title is vacated.
Rusty Foxx	2	December 12, 1997	Boonsboro, Maryland	Defeated Miss Linda for the title.
Fantasia	1	December 5, 1998	Berryville, West Virginia	
Kurt Keizer	1	April 8, 1999	Waynesboro, Pennsylvania	
The title is vacated by Kurt Keizer following a loss to Gillberg on May 13, 1999.
Fantasia	2	May 29, 1999	Hagerstown, Maryland	Defeated Nasty Jean to win vacant title.
The title is vacated on April 19, 2001.
AmyLee	1	April 23, 2001	Hagerstown, Maryland	Defeated Molly McShane in tournament final.
Molly McShane	1	May 18, 2001	Frederick, Maryland	Defeated AmyLee and Stacy in a three way dance.
Madison (wrestler)	1	August 4, 2001	Cumberland, Maryland	Won title via forfeit.
Fantasia	3	March 10, 2002	Brunswick, Maryland	
The title is abandoned on July 11, 2003.
NWL/HoPWF Ladies Championship
AmyLee	1	August 13, 2005	Newville, Pennsylvania	Won battle royal.
Kacee Carlisle	1	November 19, 2005	Newville, Pennsylvania	Won in a "No DQ" match.
AmyLee	2	August 12, 2006	Martinsburg, West Virginia	Won title in a mixed tag team match with Shorty Smalls against Kacee Carlisle & Jerkface.
The title is retired on March 1, 2007.
NWL Ladies Championship
AmyLee	1	May 18, 2008	Bridgewater, Pennsylvania	AmyLee pinned Kacee Carlisle at the two-day "Wrestle With The Stars" supercard.

== HoPWF Women's Championship ==
Wrestler:	Times:	Date:	Location:	Notes:
Fantasia	1	June 29, 2002	Blue Ridge Summit, Pennsylvania	Defeated Amy Lee to become first champion.
The title is retired on July 11, 2003.
