= Fantasia (wrestler) =

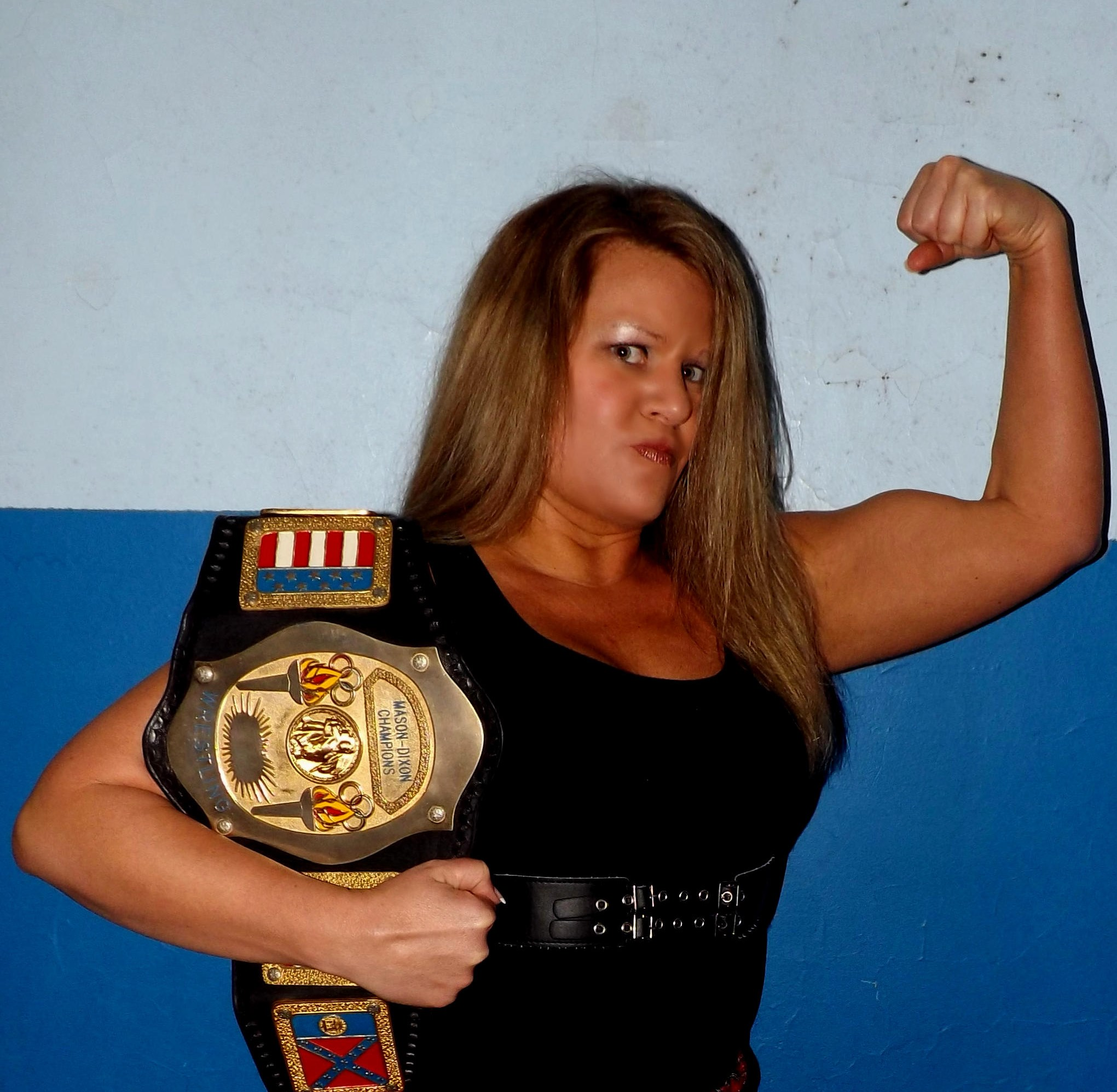

Personal information
- Born: Karen Simpson; September 4, 1972 (age 53) Frederick, Maryland, United States

Professional wrestling career
- Ring name: Fantasia
- Billed height: 5 ft 9 in (175 cm)
- Billed weight: 170 lb (77 kg)
- Trained by: Bob Starr; Nasty Angel; Spike
- Debut: 1992

Karen Simpson (born September 4, 1972), better known by her ring name Fantasia, is an American professional wrestler, trainer, promoter, and manager competing throughout North America in independent promotions, custom DVD companies, and the UK.

== Professional wrestling career ==
=== Training ===
Born in Frederick, Maryland, a graduate from Frederick High School, Fantasia had always been active in sports throughout school and excelled in power lifting and volleyball. Fantasia started her professional wrestling training in 1992 after attending a NWA Crocket Promotions at the Baltimore Arena in Baltimore, Maryland. She found little interest during the show until watching a women's wrestling match between Linda Dallas and Misty Blue Simmes. After meeting with professional wrestler Dusty Rhodes at the show she found herself ready to start her career as a professional wrestler.

With the help of her coach, Fantasia started her pro wrestling training in nearby Hagerstown, Maryland at the Superior Pro Wrestling Training Center. After three weeks of training Fantasia left the school and continued her training with Bob Starr at the Monster Factory in Baltimore and finalized training at Larry Sharpe's school in New Jersey under Nasty Angel and Spike. Fantasia made her live debut against Rusty "The Fox" Thomas in Boonsboro, Maryland for the National Wrestling League defeating Thomas.

Fantasia has competed in National Wrestling League, Pro Wrestling Entertainment, Thundergirls, World Wide Wrestling Association, and World of Women Wrestlers, and faced numerous female wrestlers, including Lexie Fyfe, Little Jeanne, Lady Victoria, Persephone, Leilani Kai, Chyna, Lita, Allison Danger, Rain, and Amber O'Neal. Her feud with Lexie Fyfe lasted over a year. Fantasia has also competed overseas and two tours of England and 44 states, as well as in custom DVDs produced by Slammin Ladies, Lady Victoria's WOWW, Sleeperkid's World, Thundergirls, and Magnificent Ladies Wrestling.

== United States Wrestling Association ==
Fantasia managed the masked heel tag team the Phantoms (Sorrow and Tragedy) in the USWA in the 1990s and would sometimes team with them against USWA babyfaces.

=== Wrestlicious ===
Fantasia also took part in the first season taping of Wrestlicious, which took place in early 2009, but did not start airing until March 2010. In the promotion, she uses the ring name Fran, one half of the tag team the Lunch Ladies with Lexie Fyfe. She made her in-ring debut on March 1 of the first episode of Takedown, teaming with Lexie Fyfe known as Gert. After the match the Lunch Ladies threw cool whip pies in the face of the referee and the Bebop girls. Fantasia along with all the other employees of Wrestlicious were released from the company after company stopped production of episodes on November 16, 2010. On May 16, 2012, it was announced that Wrestlicious is returning with its employees back.

=== Recent years ===
Fantasia continues to wrestle on live shows throughout North America and overseas as well as films custom Pro Wrestling DVDs. She currently provides training seminars at various schools worldwide training both female and male professional wrestlers, promoting and producing events, guest appearances and interviews. She continues to mentor pro wrestlers in addition to wrestling on live events and also the founder of Keeping it REAL. Fantasia currently mentors King of the Trap Marcus Streets, Amber Lea West and conducts training seminars throughout North America.

== Championships and accomplishments ==
- Allied Independent Wrestling Federation
  - AIWF Woman Wrestler of the Year (2012)
- American Pro Wrestling Alliance/Mason-Dixon Wrestling
  - APWA/MDW Women's Championship (2 time)
- Mid-Eastern Wrestling Federation
  - MEWF Women's Championship (1 time)
- Maryland Championship Wrestling
  - MCW Women's Championship (1 time)
- National Wrestling League / House of Pain Wrestling Federation
  - HoPWF Cruiserweight Championship (1 time)
  - HoPWF Women's Championship (1 time)
  - NWL Women's Championship (3 times, last)
- Pro Wrestling Entertainment
  - PWE Women's Championship (1 time)
- Shockwave Wrestling Entertainment
  - SWE Women's Championship (1 time)
- World Class Extreme Wrestling
  - WCEW ThunderGirls Diva Championship (1 time)
- World of Women Wrestling
  - WOWW Ladies Championship (1 time)
- World Wide Wrestling Alliance
  - WWWA Ladies Championship (3 times)
- Other titles
  - International Championship (1 time)
  - IAWF Women's Championship (1 time)
  - ISWA Ladies Championship (2 times)
  - MCW Women's Championship (1 time)
  - NCWA Women's Championship (1 time)
  - SWA Women's Championship (1 time)
  - TCA Ladies Championship (1 time)
  - USCW Women's Championship (1 time)
  - WOW Women's Championship (1 time)
