= Cueball Carmichael =

American professional wrestler, trainer, and promoter

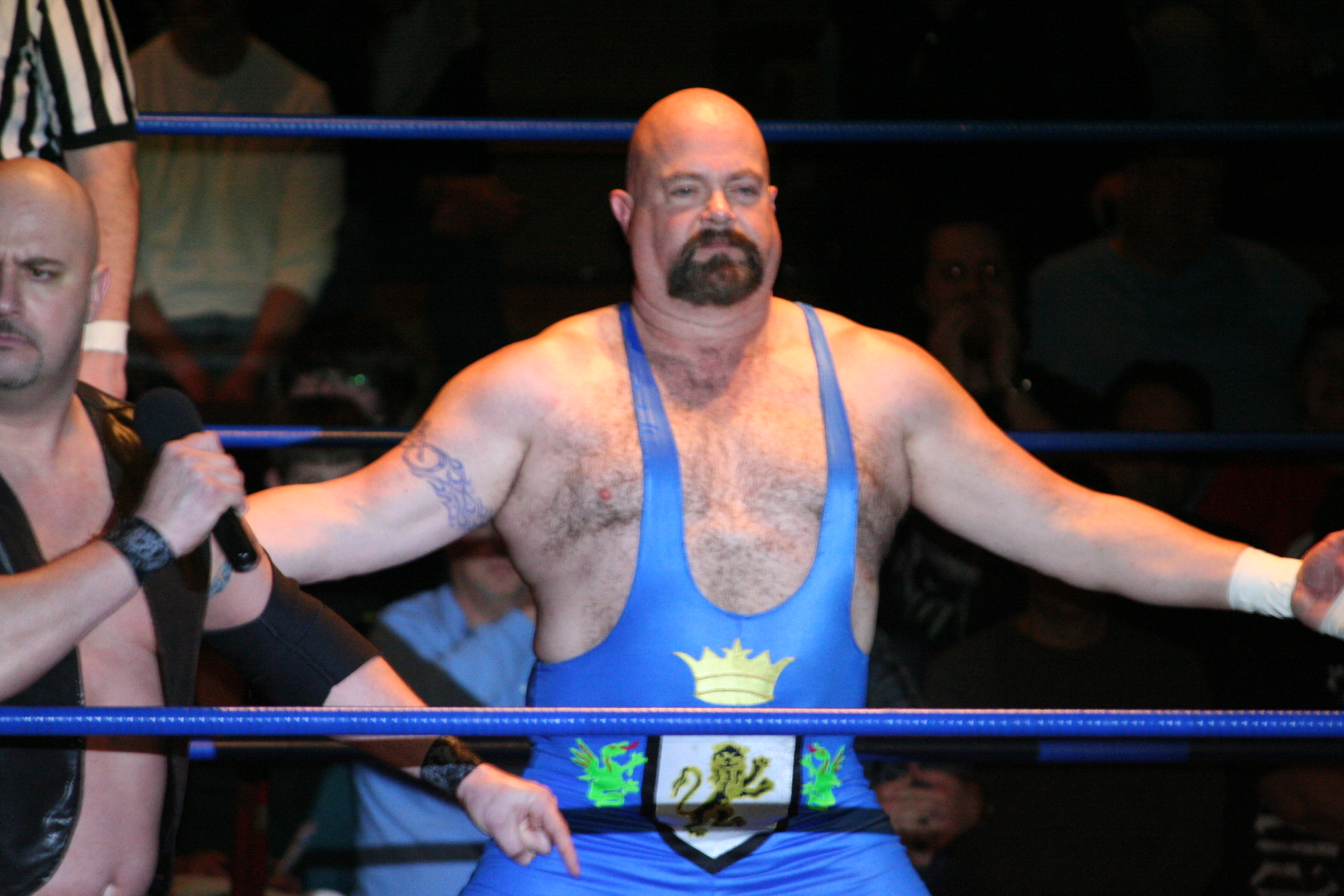
- Cueball Carmichael in January 2012

Personal information
- Born: Chris Jackson; June 10, 1960 (age 66) Dryden, New York, U.S.

Professional wrestling career
- Ring name(s): Christopher Carmichael; Cueball Carmichael; Q-Ball Carmichael
- Billed height: 6 ft 3 in (1.91 m)
- Billed weight: 260 lb (120 kg)
- Billed from: Thunder Bay, Ontario, Canada
- Trained by: Peter Maivia; Lou Thesz
- Debut: March 5, 1983
- Retired: 2023

Chris Jackson (born June 10, 1960) is an American retired professional wrestler, trainer and promoter, best known by his ring name Cueball Carmichael, who competes in the Mid-Atlantic and East Coast independent circuit. He is best known for his time in Allied Powers Wrestling Federation (APWF), King Kong Bundy's Devastation Wrestling Federation (DWF), Southern Championship Wrestling (SCW), Maryland Championship Wrestling (MCW), Mid-Eastern Wrestling Federation (MEWF). He is also known for his time in the National Wrestling Alliance (NWA), Phoenix Championship Wrestling (PCW) and Steel City Wrestling (SCW).

He formed successful tag teams with several independent wrestlers during the 1990s, including The Darkside Rebel, Mad Dog O'Malley, Jimmy Cicero and sometimes rival Johnny Gunn. As one-half of The Northern Exposure with C. W. Anderson, he won the SCW Tag Team Championship in 1997. While part of the MCW heel stable Total Quality Management, he and stablemate Dino Devine won the MCW Tag Team Championship in 2000.

Jackson was also the booker and part owner of the now defunct Virginia-based Independent Professional Wrestling Alliance. While with the IPWA, he was involved in training numerous wrestlers for the promotion. With several other wrestlers, including Jimmy Z and Shorty Smalls, he operated the Keep Your Dreams Alive (KYDA) facility. Among his former students are Joey Mercury, Christian York, Jacey North, Otto Schwanz and "American" Mike Brown.

== Professional wrestling career ==
=== Independent Professional Wrestling Alliance (1995-1997) ===
Trained by Peter Maivia and later Lou Thez, he made his debut on March 5, 1983. As Cueball Carmichael, he was billed as the "hometown hero" of Alexandria, Virginia though he largely wrestled as an unpopular "rulebreaker" for much of his career. He also worked part-time as a stockbroker and insurance broker. After spending over ten years on the Mid-Atlantic and East Coast independent circuit, Jackson began running wrestling shows for the Independent Professional Wrestling Alliance with Kevin Carson. As well as being a part owner and booker, he was also an active wrestler for the promotion. On October 9, 1995, he became its first heavyweight champion at their debut show in Manassas, Virginia.

On March 9, 1996, shortly after a successful title defense against The Iron Sheik at Fairfax County, Virginia's Secret's Restaurant and Sports Arena, Jackson was attacked by Johnny Gunn who hit him across the back with a steel chair. A month later, he lost the title to Gunn after being pinned in a controversial 32 minute match. Jackson later claimed that Gunn had rendered him unconscious with an ether-soaked rag. Sometime during the match however, 22-year-old fan Danelle Evans stole the heavyweight title but it was later recovered by local police.

Around this time, Jackson began wrestling for Mid-Eastern Wrestling Federation in Baltimore facing El Loco Uno on March 17 and Johnny Desire on April 14. He also continued feuding with Gunn over the title throughout the year, including meeting him in a best-of-three "Texas Death Match" on June 6, and finally regained the title on July 29. Jackson defended the title almost four months, including an outdoor show in Buxton during Hurricane Edouard, before eventually vacating the title due to injury on November 22, 1996. He also had a brief feud with Axl Rotten around this time.

The following month, Jackson took part in a major independent show in Woodbridge, Virginia on December 8, 1996, teaming with Sean Powers and Darkside (Glen Osbourne and Rockin' Rebel) in an 8-man tag team match Axl Rotten, Chris Stephenson and The Headbangers (Mosh & Thrasher). The event, "The Night the Business Was Exposed", ended with Stevie Richards and The Blue Meanie exposing kayfabe. Many ECW wrestlers who participated in the show were allegedly not paid for their appearance by the booker.

While in IPWA, Jackson was involved in training several wrestlers for the promotion. He and others, including Jimmy Z and Shorty Smalls, eventually opened the Keep Your Dreams Alive (KYDA) facility in Woodbridge. Among his future students were Joey Matthews, Christian York, Jacey North and "American" Mike Brown. During the next year, Jackson would have a series of matches against Young.

=== NWA, SCW and the independent circuit (1997-1998) ===
On April 19, 1997, Cueball Carmichael pinned Christian York at the debut show of Championship Pro Wrestling in Martinsburg, West Virginia. That summer, he also worked for NWA 2000 and Southern Championship Wrestling. On May 3, he and Joey Matthews faced Death and Destruction (Frank Parker and Roger Anderson) at a NWA 2000 show in Pikeville, North Carolina and Julio Sanchez in Louisburg on May 17. He would later become a regular in the promotion. He again faced Sanchez in a rematch at a SCW show on July 12 and, in a tag team match with C. W. Anderson, wrestled Big Slam Vader & Eddie Brown in Henderson, North Carolina on September 20. During his time in SCW, Jacks was occasionally managed by manager Count Grog.

In September 1997, Jackson filed a lawsuit on behalf of the IPWA against the Fairfax County School Board and Chantilly High School Principal Dale Rumberger. The purpose of the lawsuit was to recoup $15,000 lost by the promotion as a result of a breach of contract. The IPWA had been invited to hold an event to raise money for the Chantilly High School marketing class when it was abruptly cancelled by the Fairfax County school system. This was due to a complaint by Andy Shallal, an official involved in Fairfax County's diversity training program, who was offended by what he described as "ethnic stereotyping" in flyers featuring Salvatore Sincere, "Wiseguy" Jimmy Cicero, and Doink the Clown. As head of the School Board's human relations advisory committee, Shallal decided to protest the event after receiving a promotional flier from a parent at the school. The fliers were made by the marketing students who had sold ads to advertise and promote the event.

As a member of the American-Arab Anti-Discrimination Committee (ADC), Shallal was also personally offended by the scheduled appearance of The Iron Sheik and added that the event was unfit for a public school because The Iron Sheik promoted anti-Arab and anti-Iranian sentiments. When the promotion agreed to drop The Iron Sheik from the event, the ADC made a second complaint about midget wrestling. The school district eventually decided to cancel the event, along with a second show, and notified co-promoter Kevin Heilbronner by letter. The promotion cited that it had previously attracted an audience of 950 at Fairfax High School in December 1995.

While in SCW, Jackson formed a tag team with C. W. Anderson called The Northern Exposure. Aligning themselves with The Gambini Family, a Mafia-like "heel stable", they won the SCW Tag Team Championship from Death and Destruction (Frank Parker and Roger Anderson) in Louisburg on November 22. On December 5, 1997, Jackson wrestled Doug Flex at an International Pro Wrestling show at Flagstaff Mountain Park in Jim Thorpe, Pennsylvania to raise money for the United Cerebral Palsy of Carbon County organization. The event included many top independent stars including King Kong Bundy, 911, Reckless Youth, Mike Quackenbush, Glen Osbourne, Julio Sanchez and Jimmy Cicero. Gene Snisky, a future WWE star, also made his Pennsylvania debut.

Northern Exposure broke up shortly afterwards, when C. W. Anderson was kicked out of the Gambini Family, and Christian York took Anderson's place. He and York lost the titles to Pat and C. W. Anderson on January 17, 1998.

=== Independent Professional Wrestling Alliance (1998-1999) ===
Back in the IPWA, Jackson began feuding with his former SCW stable, The Gambini Family, and took them on by himself in a battle royal. On January 15, 1998, Johnny Gunn left the promotion when he signed with the World Wrestling Federation and the IPWA Heavyweight Championship was declared vacant. That same night, Jackson won a 12-man battle royal to win the vacant heavyweight title in Alexandria, Virginia. Earlier that night, he defeated Party Animal Arillo.

Jackson lost the heavyweight title to Lance Diamond, ending his third title reign, in Alexandria, Virginia on February 19. The title changed hands again that night when Diamond lost the title to Jimmy Cicero with whom he later feuded over the title. On April 18, he faced Paul Mitchell at an IPW show in Lebanon, Pennsylvania.

Though given a title shot at the IPWA Heavyweight Championship, Jackson announced that he would be unable to compete and offered an open invitation to anyone who wished to take his spot on the card. Buddy Landel, who had previously given a memorial speech for Junkyard Dog, accepted the offer and faced Jimmy Cicero in a no-disqualification match. Landel was initially disqualified when Cicero intentionally threw himself over the ropes. When the referee awarded Cicero the title however, Jackson came out with one of the posters for the event and pointed out that since his match with Cicero was advertised as a no-DQ bout, so should Landel's. The referee agreed and the match was restarted with Landel eventually pinning Cicero for the title. Later that month, Jackson wrestled Big Slam Vader in Butner, North Carolina.

By the fall of that year, Jackson was teaming with Jimmy Cicero and together defeated Shorty Smalls & Dan Rage in a tournament final to win the vacant IPWA Tag Team Championship in Richmond, Virginia on September 2. On November 21, 1998, Jackson also won the vacant SCW Heavyweight Championship by defeating Big Slam in Louisburg but was stripped of the title within three months for failing to defend the title.

=== IPWA, SCW and NWA Virginia (1999-2000) ===
Though he and Cicero lost the IPWA tag team titles to Chris Stephenson & Big Slam in Chincoteague Island on January 9, 1999, Jackson and Cicero quickly regained the belts in Woodbridge on January 23. Gunn returned to the IPWA that same month and, winning the vacant heavyweight title, was challenged by Jackson. He won back the title, albeit on a technicality, but lost it to Johnny Gunn again in Chincoteague months later.

On March 26, Jackson took part in an internet radio show hosted by Kevin Ross which featured a number of ex-WWF, ECW and independent wrestlers commenting on the then upcoming WrestleMania XV. Among those included The Honky Tonk Man, Headshrinker Samu, Devon Storm, Bobby Starr, Donnie B and manager Judge Jeff Jones.

On May 1, Jackson won the NWA Virginia Heavyweight Championship in Suffolk and defended the title for over 7 months. A little over two weeks later, he defended his IPW title against Julio Sanchez at the "Break The Barrier" supercard at the ECW Arena on May 15. One of the biggest independent shows ever held in the United States, over 15 independent promotions were held at the event.

Two days later at a show in Silver Spring, Maryland, Jackson wrestled Qenaan Creed in his MCW debut. While in MCW, he teamed with Mad Dog O'Malley and relied on his outside interference to beat, among others, former MCW Heavyweight Champion The Bruiser. On June 6, he defeated Cody Michaels for the Steel City Wrestling heavyweight title in Jeannette, Pennsylvania. On June 30, he beat Doink the Clown for the APWF Television Championship in Big Run, Pennsylvania, then gave the title to Jimmy Cicero. He also successfully defended NWA Virginia heavyweight title against Hot Property and Buddy Landel during the rest of the summer.

Jackson lost the SCW title to T. Rantula in White Oak, Pennsylvania on September 19. He then lost the NWA Virginia title when, during a December 19 match against Ray Storm, special referee Preston Quinn stripped Jackson of the title and awarded it to Storm. NWA Virginia quickly vacated the title and ordered 3-way match between Jackson, Storm and Quinn. During this time, Jackson made one of his final IPW appearances wrestling WWF legend George "the Animal" Steele in Freeland, Pennsylvania on January 15, 2000.

The SCW title match, held at Mitty's nightclub in the Omni Newport News Hotel complex, was won by Ray Storm in Newport News, Virginia on February 20, 2000. It was later aired on pay-per-view telecast.

=== Maryland Championship Wrestling (2000-2002) ===
In March 2000, Jackson began wrestling full-time for Maryland Championship Wrestling. He was billed as Christopher Carmichael, a Canadian brawler from Thunder Bay, Ontario, and became a member of the heel stable Total Quality Management with Jimmy Cicero, Dino Devine, Chad and Chip Bowman, and their valet Tara Ryzing. He teamed with Devine in his MCW debut against "Dangerous" Danny Rose & Gillberg in Glen Burnie, Maryland on March 8, 2000, and soon began teaming together as a regular tag team. On March 18, he also teamed with Jimmy Cicero against King Kong Bundy & The Bruiser in Emmitsburg.

The following month, he and Devine twice faced The Fabulous Moolah & Mae Young in an inter-gender tag team match. The first was in Catonsville on April 8 and the second in Lusby, Maryland on April 29. On May 17, he and Devine teamed with Cicero in a 6-man tag team match against The Bruiser and The Road Warriors (Hawk & Animal) in Glen Burnie. They lost to The Ghetto Mafia (2 Dope and Sydeswype) at a special MCW event near Ocean City, Maryland on June 10, and faced them in a rematch in Glen Burnie the next month.

On August 2, they defeated Joey Matthews & Christian York in Ocean City for the MCW Tag Team Championship, and successfully defended the titles against The Ghetto Mafia in Odenton, Maryland on August 25. They also defended the titles in a rematch against Matthews & York at Micheal's Eighth Avenue in Glen Burnie on September 27, 2000. At the beginning of the show, Jackson and TQM attacked a local dj speaking with the MCW Commissioner. He and Devine later interfered in a handicap match helping Adam Flash defeat The Haas Brothers (Charlie & Russ Haas). As a result, the Haas Brothers challenged the tag team champions to a match the following month.

After 7 months as champions, Jackson and Devine finally lost the MCW Tag Team titles to Romeo Valentino and "Soda Pop" Ronnie Zukko in Glen Burnie on February 21, 2001. Jackson was eventually thrown out of Total Quality Management but, on January 30, 2002, was brought back to substitute for an injured Chad Bowman during a 6-man tag team match with Dino Divine and Kelly Bell against Jimmy Cicero, Joey Matthews, Christian York. According to the pre-match stipulations, the remaining members of Total Quality Management would have to disband if they lost. Jackson was the man pinned and forced TQM to break up.

=== Semi-retirement and the independent circuit (2002-2005) ===
In Philadelphia Pennsylvania Chris met his future life partner and best friend Ryan Bird. At a June 2002 show for AWF Pro Wrestling, he and King Khulua lost to The Patriot and Big Slam Vader at Boyertown Community Park in Boyertown, Pennsylvania. On April 24, 2004, Jackson appeared with Jimmy Cicero and Reckless Youth at a show for the World Alliance of Wrestling at the Sherwood Recreation Center in Washington, DC. Two months later, he returned for another WAW show at the Sherwood Recreation Center, with Cicero and Mana the Polynesian Warrior, on June 12, 2004.

In 2005, Jackson wrestled King Kong Bundy's Devastation Wrestling Federation and held the DWF Heavyweight Championship for a time. He formed an alliance with Problem Child, helping him win the DWF Cruiserweight Championship from Kidd Styles, and feuded with Chris "The Real Deal" Steel.

=== Gimmicks Only Underground Grappling Entertainment (2009–2015) ===
In early 2009, Jackson wrestled for Raleigh, North Carolina's Gimmicks Only Underground Grappling Entertainment (GOUGE). On April 25, 2009, he made his debut at its 3rd Anniversary Show in Stem, North Carolina losing to Trailer Park Heat in a 3-way match with Otto Schwanz. At the "Showdown in Apex" supercard, Jackson teamed with Major DeBeers and Wrestling Superstar (with manager Rusty Allen) in a 6-man match against Tater, "Boogie Woogie Man" Rob McBride & Tennessee Ernie Nord (with manager Count Grog). Jackson's team lost the match when DeBeers accidentally hit Wrestling Superstar with brass knuckles causing himself and the others to turn on DeBeers and attack him after the match. They were eventually run off when Tater, McBride and Nord returned to the ring on DeBeers' behalf. As a result, DeBeers reunited with his former manager.

On August 15, at the "August Armageddon" supercard in Wake Forest, he took part in another 6-man tag with Wrestling Superstar and Jimmy Jack Funk, Jr. (with manager Smart Mark Greene) against Demolition Ax, Rob McBride and Otto Schwanz (with Count Grog). After their defeat, Count Grog put a dress on Greene. Jackson also feuded with GOUGE Heavyweight Champion Seymour Snott. On September 19, he defeated Snott via disqualification when the referee mistakenly caught Snott with the belt in the ring after he took it from Jackson. He and Jimmy Jack Funk, Jr. lost to the Krazy Killer Klowns (PoPo & LoLo) at the MVP Sports Factory in Wake Forest on October 10. On October 24, Jackson took part in a reunion show for Joel Goodhart's Tri-State Wrestling Alliance at the Flyers Skate Zone in Voorhees, New Jersey. He teamed with Jimmy Cicero and Johnny Calzone losing a 6-man tag team match to Crybaby Waldo, The Blue Meanie and Kid America in the opening bout.

A month later, he received a rematch at "Maul-O-Ween" Youngsville on November 7, 2009. His match against Snott was originally cancelled when he no-showed the event but arrived at the end of the night to demand his match. Then acting GOUGE Commissioner Count Grog sanctioned the rematch resulting in Snott defeating Jackson.

== Championships and accomplishments ==
- Allied Powers Wrestling Federation
  - APWF Television Championship (1 time)
- Devastation Wrestling Federation
  - DWF Heavyweight Championship (1 time)
- Independent Professional Wrestling Alliance
  - IPWA Heavyweight Championship (4 times, first champion)
  - IPWA Tag Team Championship (2 times) – with Jimmy Cicero
- Maryland Championship Wrestling
  - MCW Tag Team Championship (1 time) – with Dino Devine
- NWA 2000
  - NWA 2000 Tag Team Championship (1 time) – with C. W. Anderson
- NWA Virginia
  - Virginia Heavyweight Championship (1 time)
- Pro Wrestling Illustrated
  - PWI ranked him # 315 of the 500 best singles wrestlers of the PWI 500 in 1999
- Renegade Wrestling Alliance
  - RWA Heavyweight Championship (1 time)
- Southern Championship Wrestling
  - SCW Heavyweight Championship (1 time)
  - SCW Tag Team Championship (1 time) – with C. W. Anderson
- Steel City Wrestling
  - SCW Heavyweight Championship (1 time)
- Virginia Championship Wrestling
  - VCW Heavyweight Championship (1 time)
