= Curtis Thompson =

Curtis Thompson may refer to:

- Firebreaker Chip (Curtis Thompson, born 1963), American professional wrestler
- Curtis Thompson (footballer) (born 1993), English footballer for Wycombe Wanderers F.C.
- Curtis Thompson (Shortland Street character)
- Curtis Thompson (javelin thrower) (born 1996), American javelin thrower who competed in the 2018 Athletics World Cup
