= Kenny Casanova =

American professional wrestler, manager, DJ

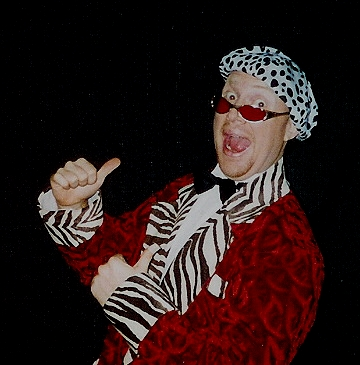
- Kenny Casanova at the 2010 New England Pro Wrestling Hall of Fame

Personal information
- Born: May 1971 (age 55) Danville, Pennsylvania, U.S.
- Website: Official website

Professional wrestling career
- Ring name(s): Kenny Casanova; Prince of Passion; Monkey Mulligan; Jimmy Jiblets; Orvin Bennit; The Pie Mafia; Camp Casanova
- Billed height: 5 ft 11 in (1.80 m)
- Billed weight: 200 lb (91 kg)
- Billed from: Armpit of America, Albany, New York
- Trained by: TC Reynolds; Tom Brandi; Matt Osborne; Bam Bam Bigelow
- Debut: 1994

Kenny Casanova (born May 1971) is an American professional wrestler, professional wrestling manager, author, and DJ. He is best known as a pro wrestler on the North East circuit, whose career has led him to be inducted in the class of New England Pro Wrestling Hall of Fame in 2010.

Over his career he has wrestled, ring announced, acted as a color-commentator, and acted as a wrestling manager. A few of the international names he has regularly managed and connected to are Luke Harper, Damien Sandow, King Kong Bundy, Nikolai Volkoff, Public Enemy's Rocco Rock, Tom Brandi,. Others include Demolition, H. C. Loc, Rocco Rock, Brutus "The Barber" Beefcake, and Japanese wrestler Shockwave The Robot. Casanova has had extensive pro wrestling feuds with The Patriot, Primo Carnera III, Tito Santana, and Jake Roberts.

In the late 90s through 2010, Casanova managed Kamala under a mask as "Kim Chee" for different promotions in the north east. This eventually led to Kenny ghostwriting Kamala's autobiography Kamala Speaks. The book helped fund a kickstarter to help offset medical costs after Kamala lost both legs to diabetes in 2011.

Kenny Casanova has written/co-written several books for Walking On Hot Waffles Publishing (WOHW Publishing) including Kamala Speaks with Kamala, Struttin' & Cuttin' with Brutus Beefcake, Vader Time with Big Van Vader, Sabu: Scars, Silence, & Superglue with Sabu (wrestler), and Mr. X - The Life Story of Dangerous Danny Davis with Dangerous Danny Davis. He has also written a time travel novel entitled TAG, and he played a role in the publication of Brute Power- The Autobiography of Buggsy McGraw with Bugsy McGraw and Ian Douglass.

== Wrestling career ==
=== Early years ===
Before becoming a pro wrestling personality, as a high school student in the spring of 1988 Page text., Kenny Casanova sold tickets and helped coordinate backstage for a wrestling promotion called WWWF. This initial experience was for an MS Fundraiser Show, put together by the legendary wrestling manager Captain Lou Albano.

Casanova's national professional wrestling career began initially as a ring announcer for the World Wrestling Federation in 1994. He also appeared on WWF Superstars of Wrestling and WWF All American Wrestling.

In fall 1994, Casanova attended a professional wrestling school in Elmira, New York with his friend Ring Of Honor and ECW wrestler H. C. Loc, as a trainer. Casanova trained under T.C. Reynolds (Doink the Clown) every weekend for the course of 15 months, learning every physical comedy spot he could. He also trained under Tom Brandi, Bam Bam Bigelow, and "Superfly" Jimmy Snuka being fully immersed as a rookie in run by the USWF. Kenny's class included other north east professional wrestlers including H. C. Loc, Thornn (Sweet Pete Waters), "Hotbod" Todd Taylor, and "Danger" Dave DeJohn. It was during this time that Casanova and his colleagues had partnered up with radio station WVCR-FM (in particular, DJ's and wrestling fans "Anarchist" Arn Abate and "Cap'n Lou-gee" Lou Graiff) in the Capital Region of New York for promotion of a number of upcoming New Breed Wrestling (NBW) events.

=== United States Wrestling Federation ===
The United States Wrestling Federation, operating out of Elmira New York was Kenny Casanova's first break. In the fall of 1995, Kenny Casanova managed and wrestled in his first team called "Damage Inc" (Danger Dave DeJohn and Hazard. He led Danger & Hazard to the USWF Tag Team Titles. Casanova also had a feud with Steve Corino and Tom Brandi in the USWF, but would later take on Salvatore Sincere (Tom Brandi's alter ego) as a key member of Camp Casanova in WWA.

He also managed "The Hollywood Escort" Sweet Pete Waters (Thornn), "Moleman" Chris Maxon (Papa Chill), H. C. Loc, The Milwaukee Mauler, King Kahlua and Salvatore Sincere.

Kenny started with USWF then left for a rival promotion called NBW, New Breed Wrestling in 1997 and then went on to wrestle for WWA wrestling, NEW wrestling, World Of Hurt Wrestling, TSW in VT and many other independents in the North East wrestling scene.

=== New Breed Wrestling ===
In April 1997, King Kong Bundy resurfaced in magazines when he joined Kenny Casanova's faction called "Camp Casanova" along with "Danger" Dave DeJohn and The Masked Maniac at times in USWF, NBW, and USA Power Pro Wrestling. In a match against "The Seven Foot Tall" Primo Carnera III, Bundy knee-dropped his opponent and then "Bundy-Splashed" him.

The impact actually broke the ring, leaving the two grapplers in a pit in the center of the squared circle. This independent footage was picked up by Pro Wrestling Illustrated. Page text. After this incident, a big battle royal to crown the first ever NBW Heavyweight Champ was scheduled to happen. However, it could not be a traditional over-the-top battle royal, as Bundy had destroyed the ring. Kenny Casanova quickly had it changed to a reverse battle royal, where the first man who could enter the ring would become the winner, Kenny Casanova's quick thinking led to his man, Iron Mike Sharpe as the winner, and first champion.

Casanova also ran his first stint in drag as "Kendra Casanova," wrestling as his own sister to obtain the NBW Ladies Championship beating Miss Patricia and Missy Hyatt on separate occasions for the title.

=== Eastern States Wrestling ===
While Kenny mostly managed and did wrestle in battle royals and tag team matches where little competition was provided for by his behalf, Kenny's first singles competition was in ESW on August 15, 1999 against his former ally John Diamond. He wrestled under a mask as "The Jive Turkey" Jimmy Giblets. Page text.

After more matches with the ESW, Casanova held the Battle Royal Championship as well as the ECW Woman's Title in Eastern States Wrestling. It was also in ESW that he added a karaoke gimmick to his character, singing at ringside during intermission, and sometimes as his own entrance to the ring.

=== World of Hurt Wrestling ===
Casanova was primarily a manager in WOHW, a federation out of Upstate NY from 1999 - 2003.

He was aligned with Dave "Danger" DeJohn and feuded with him off and on for the entire run of the federation. Here he held the woman's title on several occasions, as Kendra Casanova, beating Miss Deville, Barbie, and Kayla Sparks. His first tag team to find WOHW gold was Damage Inc, Danger & Mike Hardy, and H. C. Loc. He also managed Camp Casanova under "Old School Revolution"; a breakdance type gimmick, with members including Brodie Lee, Shana, Miss Deville, and Buttery Bert Williams.

Kenny also headed up a group called The Pie Mafia; a mysterious group of wrestlers grabbed last second from the locker room to do unscripted run-ins to hit unsuspecting wrestlers in the faces with pies, during their matches.

=== New Millenium Wrestling ===
Managed Chip Stetson to the championship, as well as tag teamed with him. Kenny also managed Monkey Mulligan and The Pie Mafia.

=== Tri State Wrestling ===
Casanova was the play-by-play and also color commentator for TSW High Impact TV Show UPN from 2001 to 2004. He also was an acting manager of his group, "Camp Casanova."

== Wrestling Championships and accomplishments ==
Eastern States Wrestling

- ESW Ladies Championship (1 time)

Genesis Wrestling

- GENESIS Tag Team Championship (1 time) - with Marty "The Party" Vain

New Breed Wrestling

- NBW Ladies Championship (1 time)

New England Pro Wrestling Hall of Fame

- Class of 2010

World of Hurt Wrestling

- WOHW Ladies Championship (1 time)

== Bibliography ==
=== Nonfiction ===
Books published by Walking On Hot Waffles Publishing (WOHW Publishing):

- Kamala Speaks (2015) co-written with Kamala
- Struttin' & Cuttin' (2018) co-written with Brutus Beefcake
- Mr. X - The Life Story of Dangerous Danny Davis (2018) with Dangerous Danny Davis
- Sabu: Scars, Silence, & Superglue (2019) co-written with Sabu
- Vader Time (2019) co-written with Big Van Vader
- Brute Power (2019) written by Bugsy McGraw and Ian Douglass
- Don't Call Me Chico (2019) co-written with Tito Santana
- Ken Patera: Weight of the World (2020) co-written with Ken Patera
- Just a Dream to... JUSTIN CREDIBLE (2020) co-written with Justin Credible
- Jess Kresa is ODB (2020) co-written with ODB (wrestler)
- Earl Hebner: The Official Story (2020) co-written with Earl Hebner

=== Fiction ===
- TAG (2016)
- Cactus Jack and the Beanstalk (2019) co-written with Mick Foley with art by Pete Bregman
- Demolition on Mars (2020) with art by Pete Bregman
- Sabu vs. The Three Little Pigs (2020) with art by Pete Bregman

== Awards ==
As a teacher, Casanova was awarded a 50k Fulbright Scholarship in 2007 from the Japanese Government to act as an American educational ambassador for their country. He spent 6 weeks in Japan, visiting many different schools in both Tokyo & Kumomoto, Japan.
