= King Kaluha =

American professional wrestler

Personal information
- Born: Michael Alegado; August 30, 1958 (age 67) Kensington, Philadelphia, U.S.
- Education: Villanova University

Professional wrestling career
- Ring name(s): King Kaluha; King Kahlua; Prince Kahlua; Mike Kaluha
- Billed height: 5 ft 10 in (178 cm)
- Billed weight: 237 lb (108 kg)
- Billed from: "Isle of Hawaii" "The Pacific Palisades in Honolulu, Hawaii"
- Debut: 1983

Michael Alegado (born August 30, 1958), better known by his ring name King Kaluha, is an American professional wrestler and trainer. He is best known for his time in D. C. Drake's Continental Wrestling Alliance, the International Championship Wrestling and National Wrestling Federation during the 1980s. He also made brief appearances in the American Wrestling Association and Jim Crockett Promotions.

Alegado worked for numerous Mid-Atlantic independent promotions during the 1990s including, most notably, Eastern Championship Wrestling, House of Pain Wrestling Federation / National Wrestling League, Maryland Championship Wrestling, Mid-Eastern Wrestling Federation, National Championship Wrestling, Steel City Wrestling and the Tri-State Wrestling Alliance. He occasionally wrestled as Doink the Clown in the Century Wrestling Alliance and NWA New Jersey from 1995 to 1997.

He is considered one of the most respected wrestlers in the Northeastern United States according to Kenny Casanova and other wrestlers. Alegado mentored or trained a number of East Coast independent stars including, most notably, Tom Brandi and Steve Corino. He has occasionally appeared for Corino's Pro Wrestling WORLD-1 promotion as both a performer and trainer. In 2014, Alegado was inducted into the Maryland Wrestling Federation Hall of Fame.

== Early life ==
Alegado was born and raised in the Kensington, Philadelphia section of Philadelphia, Pennsylvania. He was the son of a Filipino World War II veteran and a local Polish-American woman. Alegado began playing ice hockey as a youth. After graduating from Villanova University with a psychology degree, he began working out in order to try out for a European ice hockey team. He spent many hours at a local gym heavy lifting which saw his size increase from 180 to 230 lb (100 kg). Alegado was eventually noticed by a sports agent who suggested that he consider a career in professional wrestling. He trained with a man who had recently opened a wrestling school before making his pro debut in 1983.

== Professional wrestling career ==
=== Early career (1983–1986) ===
Alegado got his start with D. C. Drake's Continental Wrestling Alliance based in Allentown, Pennsylvania. One of his first matches turned into a wild brawl as he and his opponent, Damien Kane, fought outside the ring and used foreign objects such as pliers and a sandal. A teenager reportedly became so excited that after the match that he threatened another fan with a steel chair before being restrained. On August 22, 1984, he and Mickey Gilligan unsuccessfully challenged The Salt and Pepper Riot Squad (Damien Kane and Sweet Daddy White) for the CWA Tag Team Championship at the Carbon County Fair in Lehighton. On September 18, 1984, Kaluha wrestled Concrete Cowboy at the 20th annual Palmerton Hospital Festival, a yearly benefit show for facility. Alegado also wrestled for the Empire Wrestling Federation, a New Jersey–based group promoted by Jack Barnett and Enzo Morabito, where he won the promotion's heavyweight and tag team championships with Mickey Gilligan.

On January 17, 1985, Alegado defeated Diamond Jim at an International Championship Wrestling show in Portland, Maine. Later that night, he participated in a 12-man battle royal also involving Carlos Colón, King Tonga, Diamond Jim, The Prince of Pain, Rudy Diamond, Tony Ulysses, The Invaders (Invader #1 and Invader #2), and The Sheepherders (Butch Miller and Luke Williams). On May 15, 1985, Alegado took part in an American Wrestling Association television taping at the Tropicana Casino & Resort Atlantic City in Atlantic City, New Jersey. His first bout was against Sgt. Slaughter, which he lost, as well as a tag team match with Mark Pole against Steve Olsonoski and Buck Zumhofe, and with Lou Fabiano versus The High Flyers (Greg Gagne and Jim Brunzell). Alegado returned to ICW at the end of the year. On March 31, 1986, Alegado wrestled Tom Brandi for a Jim Crockett Promotions show at the Baltimore Civic Center. He was primarily involved in Brandi's training and served as a mentor throughout his career. While wrestling for promoter Mark Tendler in the mid-1980s, Alegado teamed with Mick Foley as The South Sea Islanders. The team frequently wrestled The Rock and Roll Connection (Tom Brandi and Bill Woods).

=== National Wrestling Federation (1987) ===
In 1986, D. C. Drake sold the Continental Wrestling Alliance to Robert Raskin. Alegado was one of many CWA stars who became part of the "new" National Wrestling Federation when Raskin decided to revive the 1970s-era promotion. With the promotion's weekly show on cable television, Alegado enjoyed the highest exposure of his career. On the April 11, 1987, TV taping of NWF Wrestle Power, Alegado defeated Mark Sampson at the Ocean Ice Palace in Bricktown, New Jersey. He and JD McSlade wrestled The Beach Boys (Eddie Miranda and Larry Winters) in a tag team match that same night. On June 20, 1987, Alegado defeated Tom Brandi and Steve Sampson in separate bouts at NWF Rage In A Cage. Alegado was also accompanied by 12-year-old Darren Wyse as his manager for a match in Reading, Pennsylvania that year.

=== International Championship Wrestling (1987–1988) ===
Alegado returned to International Championship Wrestling where he formed a tag team with Tom Brandi. They won the ICW Tag Team Championship together that summer. The two remained champions until losing the belts to The Moondogs (Moondog Spike and Moondog Spot) on December 28, 1987. On July 11, 1988, Alegado wrestled The Dungeon Master in Rockland, Maine. He also feuded with Vic Steamboat. Alegado remained with ICW up to the end of the year.

=== Tri-State Wrestling Alliance (1990) ===
In early 1990, Alegado began wrestling for Joel Goodhart's Tri-State Wrestling Alliance promotion in Philadelphia. On June 9, 1990, Alegado and Tom Brandi fought The American Pitbulls (Pitbull Rex and Pitbull Spike) to a double-countout at Summer Sizzler. The two were on opposite sides the following month when Alegado and Ron Shaw lost to Brandi and The Cheetah Kid by disqualification at Madison High School on July 1. He was similarly disqualified in his match against Larry Winters that same night. On August 17, 1990, Alegado defeated The Cheetah Kid for the WWCA Light Heavyweight Championship in Wall, New Jersey.

=== International World Class Championship Wrestling (1991–1992) ===
Alegado also returned to work for the Savoldi family when ICW merged with World Class Championship Wrestling to form International World Class Championship Wrestling. He was one of Kevin Von Erich's opponents in 1991. On June 6, 1992, Alegado wrestled Neil Superior to a 10 min. time-limit draw at an IWCCW show in Fleetwood, Pennsylvania.

=== Eastern Championship Wrestling (1992–1993) ===
In 1992, Joel Goodhart sold his share of the TWA to his partner Tod Gordon. Alegado stayed in Philadelphia when Gordon formed Eastern Championship Wrestling. He made his debut at ECW's second-ever event on March 24, 1992, held at the Original Sports Bar in Philadelphia, defeating Max Thrasher. Alegado regularly appeared at ECW's original sports bar shows throughout the year. He and C.N. Redd were defeated by The Flames (Mr. Anthony and Mr. Perez) on April 26. On July 14, Alegado and Scott Summers beat J.T. Smith and Hurricane Curry. He lost to Smith at the Chestnut Cabaret the following night. On August 22, Alegado won a battle royal at The Aztec Club in Philadelphia. He also received a title show against then ECW Heavyweight Champion Jimmy Snuka. On September 12, 1992, Alegado and Summers lost to Larry Winters and Jimmy Jannetty at The Aztec Club. In early 1993, Alegado wrestled Tommy Cairo at the Kensington Sports Arena. This was the first television taping for ECW's long-running show on Sports Channel America.

=== Independent circuit (1993–1999) ===
Alegado spent much of the early 1990s working for Larry Sharpe's World Wrestling Association. On March 19, 1993, Alegado wrestled The Sandman at a WWA show in Pleasantville, New Jersey. He also wrestled The Big Boss Man for an All States Wrestling Association show at Lincoln High School in Ellwood City, Pennsylvania. That same year, Alegado traveled to Venezuela where he and Bastion Booger took on The Bushwhackers (Bushwhacker Butch and Bushwhacker Luke). They lost the match after Alegado was hit with the "Bushwhacker battering ram" finisher. Other international tours took Alegado to Ecuador, where "the crowd whistled and threw oranges at him" while wrestling in a bullfighting ring, and Rome competing before 14,000–15,000 people.

In 1994, Alegado and Dory Funk Jr. trained Steve Corino. Corino later credited Alegado for mentoring him during his early career. He also feuded with his former student Tom Brandi, now wrestling under the name "Johnny Gunn", on the Mid-Atlantic independent circuit. On April 16, 1994, Alegado lost to Gunn at the World Wide Wrestling Alliance supercard The Brawl At The Taj Mahal in Atlantic City, New Jersey. He was also beaten by Gunn at an NWA New Jersey show in Red Lion, Pennsylvania two weeks later. They also brought their feud to Steel City Wrestling in Pittsburgh. In October, Alegado entered a championship tournament to crown the inaugural SCW Heavyweight Championship. He was eliminated in the semi-finals by Shane Douglas in Connellsville, Pennsylvania on October 10, 1994. In August 1995, Alegado became the first heavyweight champion for the United States Wrestling Federation. While in the USWF, Alegado was one of the first wrestlers to be managed by The Prince of Passion. He also wrestled as Doink the Clown in the Century Wrestling Alliance and NWA New Jersey. On October 21, 1994, Alegado and The Viper wrestled Duane Gill and Wayne Gill at a Maryland Championship Wrestling show in Pasadena, Maryland. On August 13, 1995, he and Jim Powers lost to Johnny Gunn and The Rockin' Rebel at the MEWF Arena in Essex, Maryland.

On June 30, 1996, Alegado faced Jimmy Snuka for a New Jack City Wrestling show in Asbury Park, New Jersey. Alegado wrestled Spellbinder at an Eastern Shores Wrestling event in New York City on November 30, 1996. On March 1, 1997, Alegado (as Doink the Clown) defeated Steve Corino at the Salaam Shrine Temple in Livingston, New Jersey. On November 8, 1997, he also defeated Doink the Clown at a MEWF show in Keyser, West Virginia. On April 19, 1998, Alegado unsuccessfully challenged Tom Brandi for the SCW Heavyweight Championship at St. Vincent College in Latrobe, Pennsylvania. He again wrestled Brandi for New Breed Wrestling in Saratoga Springs, New York two months later. Alegado and Brandi's feud on the independent circuit continued for much of the 1990s.

=== Independent circuit (2000–2004) ===
In 2000, Alegado made a brief cameo on the MTV reality TV series True Life episode "I'm A Pro Wrestler". On April 29, 2001, Alegado headlined Deaf Wrestlefest 2001, an annual fundraiser for Western Pennsylvania School for the Deaf, with The Patriot. On August 17, 2002, Alegado once again wrestled The Patriot for an International Wrestling Cartel show in Canonsburg, Pennsylvania. On January 24, 2004, Alegado faced Snatch Haggis at a National Wrestling League event for Blackhawk High School in Beaver Falls, Pennsylvania. Alegado was disqualified when his cornerman, Johnny Valiant, entered the ring to attack Haggis while attempted a pinfall.

=== Pro Wrestling WORLD-1 (2004) ===
Alegado was recruited by former student Steve Corino as both a performer and trainer for Pro Wrestling WORLD-1, the U.S. affiliate of Pro Wrestling ZERO1, in the mid-2000s. In the spring of 2004, he took part in WORLD-1 "Revisited Tour" defeating W1 Dojo student Alex Law in Pottstown, Pennsylvania on April 8 and Eddie Guapo in Essington, Pennsylvania on April 10. He and Corino operated the Revolution Puroresu Dojo training center inside the Gold's Gym in Limerick, Pennsylvania.

=== Independent circuit (2005) ===
Elsewhere on the independent circuit, Alegado teamed with Mana the Polynesian Warrior as The Tsunami Express. He also served as the opponent for "Dr. Death" Steve Williams at WrestleReunion 2. It was Williams' first match after his battle with throat cancer, and according to promoter Sal Corrente, the wrestler was initially hesitant to work with Alegado.

The other moment with Steve that really stands out in my mind was when I decided to contact him about getting back in the ring at WrestleReunion 2 in Valley Forge, Pennsylvania. He was concerned and rightfully so with what he was going through that everything would have to go well. I assured him that I had the perfect opponent in mind for him. It was Mike Kaluha from Pennsylvania. I had met Mike early on in my career [and] I knew he was the right man for the job. He was solid in the ring and a credible human being outside the ring. He understood why he was there and I knew he wouldn't let me down.

Well, although Steve knew me, he didn't know Mike and I could tell he was plenty worried. After a while he kept coming to me with his concerns I asked him to trust me that I wouldn't put him in harm's way at all. If I hadn't had the right guy we wouldn't have even done this. Well, Steve had his comeback match and afterwards came to me and apologized for giving me so much grief and to let me know I had made the right choice of opponent and how appreciative he was. I am not sure exactly what has gone in with Steve's in ring career since that match in August 2005 but I am sure that was a very special moment for him if not his last really great in ring moment. It was a great moment for me as well it will always be with me.

=== Pro Wrestling WORLD-1 (2005) ===
He returned to action the following year for WORLD-1's "Return Show". On August 6, 2005, Alegado defeated Ricky Landell in Philadelphia after a 21 min. bout. He continued feuding with Landell on and off for the next few years. That fall, Alegado entered a championship tournament to crown the first-ever World-1 Internet Television Champion. He defeated Larry Sweeney in the opening rounds on September 16, 2005. Joined by manager Marcus "King Kong" Dowling, Alegado and Sweeney eventually began teaming together as The Downtown Playboys.

=== Independent circuit (2005) ===
Alegado wrestled against Leatherman at Piledriver Pro's debut show in September 2005. He also appeared for Dan McDevitt's wrestling shows at Fort Meade. On October 1, Alegado and Eagle (accompanied by manager Royce C. Profit) battled Romeo Valentino and The Patriot at the facility. Alegado continued feuding with The Patriot thought the Mid-Atlantic area. On November 12, Alegado lost to The Patriot at CPW's "Cruel Intentions" in Moorefield, West Virginia. The two also clashed in the Pittsburgh-based International Wrestling Cartel. He was defeated by The Patriot at the IWC's "Showdown in Utown 4" in Uniontown, Pennsylvania on November 19. The following night at the "Newville Knockout" show, Alegado and Mark Mest lost to The Patriot and King Kong Bundy at Big Spring High School in Newville, Pennsylvania. On December 3, 2005, at "Winter Bash 2005", Alegado was beaten by The Patriot for a third time at Clarion University of Pennsylvania.

=== Pro Wrestling WORLD-1 (2006) ===
On January 29, 2006, Alegado defeated Claudio Castagnoli, Josh Daniels and The Masked Grappler in a four-way elimination match in Boyertown, Pennsylvania to win the World-1 Internet Television Championship. On April 9, Alegado and Larry Sweeney wrestled The Patriot and Josh Daniels to a double-countout. One month later, a Champion vs Champion match against WORLD-1 Heavyweight Champion Ricky Landell in Philadelphia ended in a double-disqualification. The Blue Meanie was the special guest referee. On May 7, 2006, The Downtown Playboys won the WORLD-1 Tag Team Championship in a 3-Way Dance against Greg Spitz & Mark Mest and The Patriot & Josh Daniels in Boyertown, Pennsylvania. He entered a tournament for the WORLD-1 Great Lakes Openweight Championship weeks later. Alegado advanced to the semi-finals in Bay City, Michigan where he and his opponent were eliminated via double-countout. During their time in WORLD-1, The Downtown Playboys were involved in an 18-month storyline which saw The Patriot enlisting various tag team partners in an attempt to unseat the tag team champions. Alegado and Sweeney were eventually beaten for the title by The Patriot and Mike Kehner at WORLD-1's "Rebirth or Destruction" at the end of the year.

=== Independent circuit (2006–2009) ===
Alegado spent the fall of 2006 traveling the local independent circuit. These included stops in National Wrestling Superstars where he faced WWE Hall of Famers such as Brutus "The Barber" Beefcake, King Kong Bundy, and Tito Santana. On September 29, Alegado was Salvatore Sincere's cornerman in his NWS bout against Larry Zbyszko. On October 14 in Romney, West Virginia, Alegado lost to The Patriot at CPW's "Wrestle War 2006" in a no-disqualification match. On December 29, 2006, Alegado was accompanied by Salvatore Sincere in his NWS match against Draven in Long Branch, New Jersey.

After a brief stay in the Cincinnati-based Northern Wrestling Federation in early 2007, Alegado headed back to the Mid-Atlantic area. On March 3, 2007, he took on King Kong Bundy and Salvatore Sincere in a three-way match for NWS in Point Pleasant Beach, New Jersey. The following week, Alegado and Corvis Fear lost to Mikey Pacifica and Big Slam Vader in a Kiss-My-Butt (Or Be Fired) match. On March 24, Alegado made a one-time return to the International Wrestling Cartel for "Night of Legends III" where he lost to The Patriot. Alegado was also in the corner of Salvatore Sincere during his match against Jim "The Anvil" Neidhart and was attacked by the wrestler after making Sincere submit to the camel clutch. Two days later, Alegado wrestled Test at Maryland Championship Wrestling's "March Madness: When Monsters Collide" in Dundalk, Maryland. On April 24, Alegado (with Foxxy Foxxy) and Johnny Candido wrestled to a no-contest at an NWS show in Carteret, New Jersey. The two wrestlers faced each other in the main event which saw Candido and Monsta Mack defeated Alegado and Greg "The Hammer" Valentine. That same year, Alegado became part of Royce Profit's Creative Control stable with Salvatore Sincere, Danny Doring, Nicky Benz, and Sgt. Jimmy Storm. On May 5, 2007, Creative Control (King Kaluha, Nicky Benz and Sgt. Jimmy Storm) wrestled The Patriot, The Rogue and NWS referee Mike "Quick Count" Dillon at The Elks Lodge in Brick, New Jersey. Tracy Brooks was the special guest referee. On November 3, Kahlua returned to NCW and defeated Adam Flash for the NCW Heavyweight Championship. On December 31, 2007, a match between Alegado and "Mr. USA" Tony Atlas ended in a no-contest. In the main event, Atlas teamed with Jimmy "Superfly" Snuka defeated Alegado and Salvatore Sincere.

On January 25, 2008, Alegado faced Rikishi at an NWS show in South River, New Jersey. He received a post-match stinkface after losing to him. The next night in Brick Township, New Jersey, Alegado and Miss Michelle were in the corner of Julio Dinero in his NWS match against The Patriot. Dinero had initially won the bout using a chain to pin his opponent but the decision was reversed when a second official came out to the ring. Alegado joined Dinero and Danny Doring in a 3-on-1 attack after The Patriot was declared the winner. The trio were run off by Rikishi and The Blue Meanie setting up a 6-man tag team match for the main event. Alegado, Dinero and Doring lost to The Patriot, Rikishi and The Blue Meanie in a Best-Of-Three-Falls Match when Alegado was pinned by Rikishi.

That spring, Alegado retained the NCW Heavyweight Championship against Ricky Morton at NCW's "The Hart of Rock And Roll". On May 9, King Kaluha defeated Sweet Daddy Ebony at a NWA 3000 Revolution event in Limerick Township, Pennsylvania. A month later in Maple Shade, New Jersey, at 3K Wrestling's War Before RAW, Alegado and Ricky Landell lost to Kid America and Steve Corino in a match for the vacant PWF Tag Team Championship. On June 22, in a rematch for the NCW title, Kaluha (with Jonathan Luvstruk) beat Ricky Morton by disqualification at a New Elite Wrestling show. He was among the eight wrestlers to compete in 3K Wrestling's Shinya Hashimoto Memorial Tournament one-night tournament at Gold's Gym in Limerick Township, Pennsylvania. The winner was given a title shot at the NWA World Heavyweight Championship. On July 11, Kaluha and Mr. Wrestling III were eliminated from the tournament after battling to a 15-minute time-limit draw. On July 23, Kaluha wrestled Tito Santana at an ECPW show in Middletown, New Jersey. On August 22, Alegado defeated Ricky Landell for the Zero-One United States Heavyweight Championship in Limerick, Pennsylvania. He also held the 3KW World Heavyweight Championship during this time. Alegado's Zero-One title reign lasted nearly three months until his defeat by Mr. Wrestling III on November 11. One week later, Alegado entered a tournament for the B4W Heavyweight Championship. He was eliminated in the semi-finals via disqualification by Gordon P. Samsonite on November 15, 2008. That same year, Alegado and Tom Brandi were among the "roasters" for the Iron Sheik Roast produced by Kayfabe Commentaries. C. M. Burnham of Oklafan.com praised the performances of Alegado and Brandi in his review of the event noting that the two men had "the best material out of all of the wrestlers".

On January 30, 2009, Alegado lost to Gordon P. Samsonite in a champion vs. champion match at "When Worlds Collide", an interpromotional supercard co-hosted by 3K Wrestling and Brookwood 4 Wrestling in Shark River Hills, New Jersey. As a result, Samsonite won both the B4W and 3KW Heavyweight Championships. On March 27, Alegado lost the B4W North American Championship to Alex Anthony at B4W's "Collision Course". On April 17, Alegado defeated Chris Rockwell and Kid America in a 3-Way Dance at B4W's "Dead End" to qualify for the promotion's upcoming "Triad Tournament". On August 4, Alegado defeated CK Kross at an East Coast Pro Wrestling show in Ridgefield Park, New Jersey. On November 29, Alegado wrestled Greg Matthews in a Lumberjack match for Darren Wyse's National Championship Wrestling promotion. On December 5, 2009, Alegado took part in a Tri-State Wrestling Alliance reunion show at St. Matthews Baptist Church in Williamstown, New Jersey with he and Larry Winters appearing on the undercard match. Alegado lost the bout via countout.

=== Semi-retirement (2010-present) ===
On March 6, 2010, Alegado defeated Chest Flexor at "IWC Clearfield Cataclysm 2" in Clearfield, Pennsylvania. Three weeks later, he beat Doink the Clown at a show for Slam Championship Wrestling in Gloucester City, New Jersey. In May 2010, Alegado was one of several independent stars to appear for a weekend supercard in King of Prussia to raise awareness about childhood autism. It was promoted by Tom Brandi under the American Wrestling Federation banner. Proceeds from the event went to Autism Speaks. On June 4, 2010, Alegado wrestled Jimmy Snuka for an East Coast Pro Wrestling show in Amsterdam, New York.

On October 15, 2011, Alegado took part in a special benefit show held in East Norriton, Pennsylvania. The event was organized by Tom Brandi to celebrate National Breast Cancer Awareness Month with a portion of the proceeds being donated to the Susan G. Komen for A Cure foundation. On November 5, Alegado wrestled Kid Kattrell at a National Championship Wrestling event in York, Pennsylvania for the promotion's heavyweight championship. Alegado's "management team" under "Playboy" Jonathan Luvstruk were banned from the building during the bout. On November 12, Alegado was inducted into the IPWA Hall of Fame as part of Devastation Wrestling Federation's tribute to Larry Sharpe. He made an appearance for the Worldwide Wrestling Alliance that same month. On December 10, 2011, Alegado defeated Amadeus Thorn at the Silver Wing Arena in Gilbertsville, Pennsylvania. On September 23, 2012, Alegado wrestled Steve Corino in a "student vs. teacher" match in Birdsboro, Pennsylvania for the DREAMS Project.

On March 1, 2014, Alegado was inducted into the Maryland Wrestling Federation Hall of Fame along with Barry Hardy, The Stro, Thunder Morgan, Rockin’ Rebel, Johnny Rambo and Ed DeWitt. Since 2014, Alegado has been wrestling for Right Coast Pro in Newark, Delaware. In the summer of 2015, Alegado entered a championship tournament for the RCP Heavyweight Championship. He made it to the semi-finals at RCP Festivus where he lost to Steeler in a 3-Way Dance also involving Chachi.

As of 2026, he still wrestles at 67.

== Personal life ==
Alegado and his wife Jackie have a daughter and a son: Victoria "Tori" Alegado (born 1993) and Michael Alegado, Jr. (born 1996). His wife suffered from epileptic seizures after a roller skating accident as a teenager. Fearing that Mike Alegado might suffer from a ring injury, she once threatened to stop dating him if he did not quit pro wrestling. Aside from chronic back pain, and a stress fracture in the back of one of his legs, Alegado escaped serious injury during his long career. He has attributed his longevity to a 2 1/2-hour, 6-day training regimen at Gold's Gym in Royersford. Alegado also avoided using anabolic steroids. Alegado worked as a training consultant and software designer during his wrestling career. As of 2010, he is employed as a Senior Technical Trainer at Qlik, a leading data and analytics technology firm based in King of Prussia, Pennsylvania.

== Championships and accomplishments ==
- American Wrestling Federation
  - AWF North American Championship (1 time)
- Brookwood 4 Wrestling
  - B4W North American Championship (1 time)
- Devastation Wrestling Federation
  - IPWA Hall of Fame (Class of 2011)
- Empire Wrestling Federation
  - EWF Heavyweight Championship (1 time)
  - EWF Tag Team Championship (1 time) – with Mickey Gilligan
- International Championship Wrestling
  - ICW Tag Team Championship (1 time) – with Tom Brandi
- Maryland Wrestling Federation
  - MWF Hall of Fame (Class of 2014)
- National Championship Wrestling
  - NCW Heavyweight Championship (1 time)
- Pro Wrestling Illustrated
  - PWI ranked King Kaluha # 315 of the 500 best singles wrestlers of the PWI 500 in 1991
  - PWI ranked King Kaluha # 328 of the 500 best singles wrestlers of the PWI 500 in 1992
  - PWI ranked King Kaluha # 365 of the 500 best singles wrestlers of the PWI 500 in 1993
  - PWI ranked King Kaluha # 424 of the 500 best singles wrestlers of the PWI 500 in 1994
  - PWI ranked King Kaluha # 285 of the 500 best singles wrestlers of the PWI 500 in 1995
  - PWI ranked King Kaluha # 278 of the 500 best singles wrestlers of the PWI 500 in 1996
  - PWI ranked King Kaluha # 431 of the 500 best singles wrestlers of the PWI 500 in 2009
- Pro-Wrestling WORLD-1
  - WORLD-1 Internet Television Championship (1 time, inaugural, final)
  - WORLD-1 Tag Team Championship (1 time) – with Larry Sweeney
  - PWF Universal Tag Team Championship (1 time) – with Larry Sweeney
  - WORLD-1 Internet Television Title Tournament (2005)
- Pro Wrestling Zero1
  - Zero-One United States Heavyweight Championship (1 time)
- 3K Wrestling Fighting Athletes / DREAMS Project
  - 3KW World Heavyweight Championship (2 times, final)
- United States Wrestling Federation
  - USWF Heavyweight Championship (1 time)
- United States Wrestling League
  - USWL Tag Team Championship (1 time) – with Siva Afi
- Summit Wrestling Association
  - SWA Heavyweight Championship (1 time)
- United States Wrestling
  - USW Heavyweight Championship (1 time)
