= IWCCW Television Championship =

Professional wrestling championship

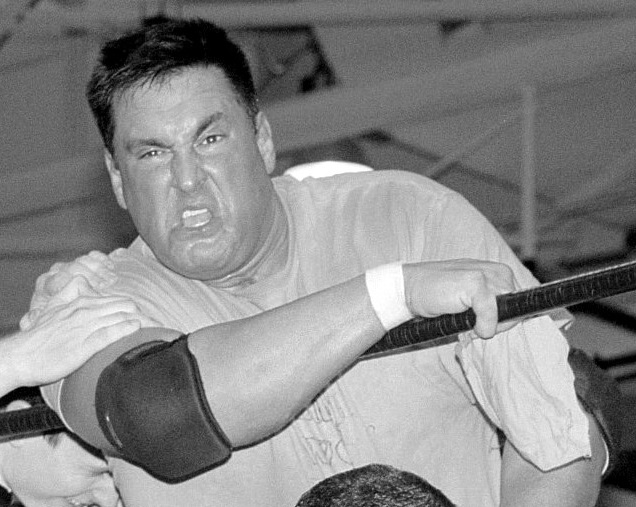
- Tom Brandi the inaugural champion

Details
- Promotion: International World Class Championship Wrestling
- Date established: December 26, 1991
- Date retired: 1993
Statistics
- First champion: Tom Brandi
- Longest reign: Firebreaker Chip (at least 218 days)
- Shortest reign: Tom Brandi (154 days)
- Oldest champion: Firebreaker Chip (29 years, 129 days)
- Youngest champion: Tom Brandi (25 years, 170 days)
- Heaviest champion: Tom Brandi (270 lb (120 kg))
- Lightest champion: Firebreaker Chip (244 lb (111 kg))

The IWCCW Television Championship was the short lived secondary championship of International World Class Championship Wrestling. The title existed for a little over a year before being abandoned by the promotion. The IWCCW Television title has the distinction of being the only IWCCW title that did not originate in its predecessor, the ICW, but was created after ICW and WCCW merged. The TV title was abandoned in 1993 when a number of wrestlers left IWCCW to form Century Wrestling Alliance. Because the championship is a professional wrestling championship, it is not won or lost competitively but instead by the decision of the bookers of a wrestling promotion. The championship is awarded after the chosen team "wins" a match to maintain the illusion that professional wrestling is a competitive sport.

== Title history ==
Key
No.	Overall reign number
Reign	Reign number for the specific champion
Days	Number of days held

No.	Champion	Championship change			Reign statistics		Notes	Ref.
No.	Champion	Date	Event	Location	Reign	Days	Notes	Ref.
1	Tom Brandi	December 26, 1991	N/A	N/A	1	154	Tom Brandi was awarded the Television Championship.	
1	Firebreaker Chip	May 28, 1992	IWCCW Live event	Hamburg, Pennsylvania	1	(Note: The exact date IWCCW abandoned the television championship is not documented which means the championship reign lasted anywhere between 218 days and 582 days)		
—	Deactivated	1993	—	—	—	—		
