= IPWA Heavyweight Championship (United States) =

Professional wrestling championship

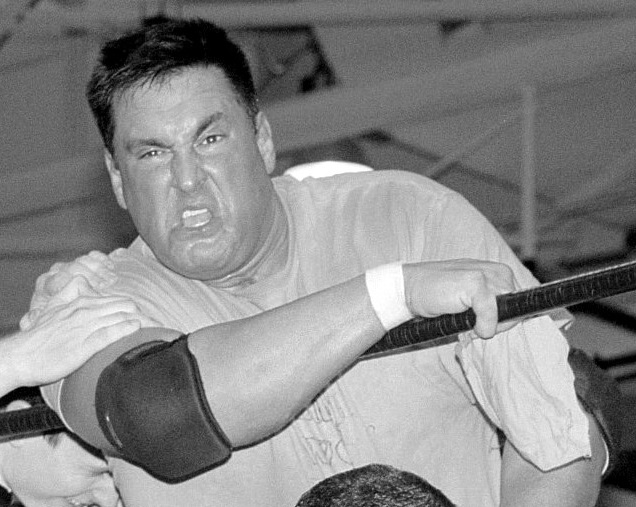
- Tom Brandi was the final IPWA Heavyweight Champion.

Details
- Promotion: Independent Professional Wrestling Alliance
- Date established: October 9, 1995
- Date retired: 2001
Statistics
- First champion(s): Cueball Carmichael
- Final champion(s): Tom Brandi (won August 21, 1999)
- Most reigns: Cueball Carmichael (4); Tom Brandi (4)
- Longest reign: Big Slam Vader (255 days)
- Shortest reign: Lance Diamond (<1 day)

The IPWA Heavyweight Championship was a professional wrestling heavyweight championship in the Independent Professional Wrestling Alliance (IPWA). The inaugural champion was Cueball Carmichael, who defeated Justin St. John following a battle royal on October 9, 1995 to become the first IPWA Heavyweight Champion.

There were 10 officially recognized champions with both Carmichael and Tom Brandi winning the title a record 4-times. At 255 days, Big Slam Vader was the longest reigning champion in the title's history. A number of top independent stars held the title during its near 6-year history including Lance Diamond, "Wiseguy" Jimmy Cicero, and "Nature Boy" Buddy Landel.

== Title history ==
| # | Order in reign history |
| Reign | The reign number for the specific set of wrestlers listed |
| Event | The event in which the title was won |
| — | Used for vacated reigns so as not to count it as an official reign |
| N/A | The information is not available or is unknown |
| + | Indicates the current reign is changing daily |

=== Names ===
| Name | Years |
|---|---|
| IPWA Heavyweight Championship | 1995–2001 |

=== Reigns ===
| # | Wrestlers | Reign | Date | Days held | Location | Event | Notes | Ref. |
|---|---|---|---|---|---|---|---|---|
| 1 | Cueball Carmichael | 1 | October 9, 1995 | 186 | Manassas, Virginia | IPWA Debut Show (1995) | Carmichael defeated Justin St. John in a singles match, after both were declared co-winners of a battle royal, to become the first IPWA Heavyweight Champion. | |
| 2 | Johnny Gunn | 1 | April 12, 1996 | 108 | Alexandria, Virginia | Live event | | |
| 3 | Cueball Carmichael | 2 | July 27, 1996 | 116 | Alexandria, Virginia | Live event | This was a steel cage match. | |
| — | Vacated | — | November 22, 1996 | — | Alexandria, Virginia | Live event | The championship is vacated when Cueball Carmichael suffers a serious injury. | |
| 4 | Big Slam Vader | 1 | January 19, 1997 | 255 | Pikeville, North Carolina | Live event | Vader defeated Guido Falcone, following a battle royal, to win the vacant title. | |
| — | Vacated | — | October 1, 1997 | — | N/A | N/A | The championship is vacated when Big Slam fails to appear for a scheduled title defense. | |
| 5 | Salvatore Sincere | 2 | November 6, 1997 | 70 | N/A | Live event | Sincere defeated Jimmy Cicero in a tournament final to win the vacant championship. | |
| — | Vacated | — | January 15, 1998 | — | Alexandria, Virginia | Live event | The championship is vacated when Salvatore Sincere leaves the promotion to join the World Wrestling Federation. | |
| 6 | Cueball Carmichael | 3 | January 15, 1998 | 35 | Alexandria, Virginia | Live event | Carmichael defeated Christian York in a singles match, after both were declared co-winners of a 12-man battle royal, to win the vacant title. | |
| 7 | Lance Diamond | 1 | February 19, 1998 | <1 | Alexandria, Virginia | Live event | This was a 6-man tag team elimination match with Christian York and Steve Corino against Cueball Carmichael, Jimmy Cicero, and Julio Sanchez. | |
| 8 | Jimmy Cicero | 1 | February 19, 1998 | 114 | Alexandria, Virginia | Live event | Cicero pinned Lance Diamond in the final fall winning both the 6-man tag team match and the IPWA Heavyweight Championship. | |
| 9 | Buddy Landel | 1 | June 13, 1998 | 210 | Alexandria, Virginia | Live event | | |
| — | Vacated | — | January 9, 1999 | — | Chincoteague, Virginia | Live event | The championship is vacated when Buddy Landel fails to appear for a scheduled title defence against Tom Brandi and is stripped of the title. | |
| 10 | Tom Brandi | 3 | January 9, 1999 | 205 | Chincoteague, Virginia | Live event | Brandi defeated Corporal Punishment to win the vacant championship. | |
| 10 | Cueball Carmichael | 4 | August 2, 1999 | 19 | Clifton, New Jersey | Live event | | |
| 10 | Tom Brandi | 4 | August 21, 1999 | N/A | Chincoteague, Virginia | Live event | | |
| — | Deactivated | — | 2001 | — | N/A | N/A | The IPWA ceases promoting events and closes in the spring of 2001. | |

== List of combined reigns ==
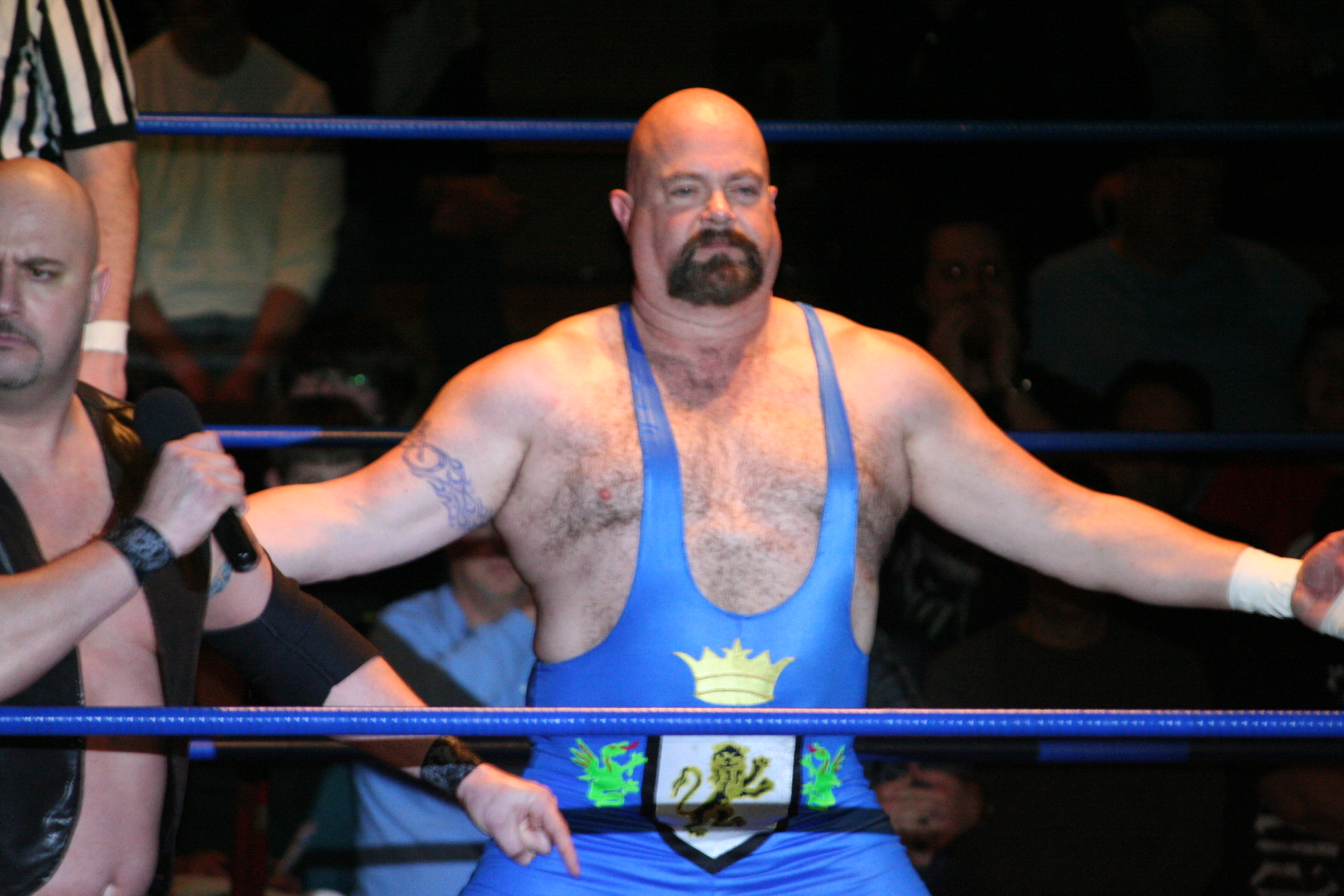
Cueball Carmichael, who was the longest-reigning IPWA Heavyweight Champion

| <1 | Indicates that the reign lasted less than one day. |

| Rank (Note: Each reign is ranked highest to lowest; reigns with the same number mean that they are tied for that certain rank.) | Wrestler | # of reigns | Combined days |
|---|---|---|---|
| 1 | Tom Brandi | 4 | 255 |
| 2 | Cueball Carmichael | 4 | 356 |
| 3 | Big Slam Vader | 1 | 255 |
| 4 | Buddy Landel | 1 | 210 |
| 5 | Jimmy Cicero | 1 | 114 |
| 6 | Lance Diamond | 1 | <1 |
