= Scotty Summers =

American professional wrestler

Professional wrestling career
- Ring name(s): Scotty Summers; Scott Sommers; Scott Summers
- Billed height: 6 ft 1 in (1.85 m)
- Billed weight: 252 lb (114 kg)
- Trained by: Charlie Fulton
- Debut: 1990
- Retired: 2000

Scotty "Hot Body" Summers is a retired American professional wrestler who competed in regional and independent promotions throughout the United States and Canada during the 1990s and 2000s. One-half of Hot Paradise with Johnny Paradise, the two held the unified tag team titles of Border City Wrestling and Motor City Wrestling for almost two years. He also had brief stints in Eastern Championship Wrestling, Midwest Territorial Wrestling, World Championship Wrestling and the World Wrestling Federation before ending his career, like many former MCW stars, in the old Central States territory.

== Career ==
=== Early career (1990–1993) ===
Trained by Charlie Fulton, Scotty Summers made his professional wrestling debut in 1990. Early in his career, he wrestled for Oklahoma promoters Chon Scott and Raymon Downey in the Tulsa-based Central States Wrestling Alliance. It was there that he won his first championship title by defeating Annihilator for the CSWA Heavyweight title. Summers remained champion after the promotion changed its name to World Wrestling Empire (WWE) that same year. As its first heavyweight champion, he would continue to wrestle on and off for the WWE throughout his career and reportedly held the WWE Heavyweight title a record 5-times.

Summers would also make several appearances as a preliminary wrestler in World Championship Wrestling and the World Wrestling Federation during the next two years. On August 29, 1990, he wrestled and lost to The Barbarian at the Civic Center in Wheeling, West Virginia; the match would later air on WWF Wrestling Challenge the following month. A year later in WCW, Summers teamed with Tommy Angel, Larry Santo and David Isley in a 7-man handicap tag team match against The Four Horsemen (Ric Flair, Barry Windham and Sid Vicious) at the Center Stage Theatre in Atlanta on February 23, 1991. Summers' team lost when he was pinned by Vicious after a choke slam. Afterwards, Summers and his three teammates were all powerbombed by Vicious and had to be taken out of the ring by medics and carried backstage on stretchers. This match was later shown on WCW Saturday Night.

He also began wrestling for Motor City Wrestling and pinned his old trainer Charlie Fulton at a local high school in Gaylord, Michigan on May 4, 1991. At that same event, he won a 12-man battle royal by simultaneously eliminating Fulton and Al Snow. Later that year, he also entered an 8-man championship tournament at the Civic Center in Lima, Ohio to decide the first ICW Northern States Heavyweight Champion. He defeated Rob Zakowski in the opening round, and "Iron" Mike Anthony in the semifinals to advance to finals where he lost to Scott "The Rock" Stevens.

Summers returned to the WWF three months later where, on the August 19th edition of WWF Superstars, he lost to Skinner at the War Memorial in Rochester, New York. At the end of the year, he and Ron Cooperman wrestled The Southern Boys (Tracey Smothers & Steve Armstrong) at the Charleston Civic Center on WCW Power Hour. On March 21, 1992, Summers made his last WWF television appearance on WWF Superstars with Bill Wood and Dale Wolfe in a 6-man tag team match against The Mountie and The Nasty Boys (Brian Knobs & Jerry Sags) at the SunDome in Tampa, Florida. Summers was pinned by Sags after their "Trip to Nastyville" finishing move.

On July 14, 1992, Summers made his Eastern Championship Wrestling debut teaming with King Kaluha to defeat JT Smith & Hurricane Curry at the Original Sports Bar in Philadelphia. The following night, he and The Super Ninja beat The Night Breed (Glen Osbourne & Max Thrasher) at Philadelphia's Chestnut Cabaret. He returned to ECW later that year in a short-lived tag team with King Kaluha where they feuded with Jimmy Jannetty & Larry Winters during September and October 1992.

=== Midwest Territorial Wrestling and Motor City Wrestling (1994–1996) ===
By 1994, Summers was back in the Great Lakes region competing for Border City Wrestling and Midwest Territorial Wrestling. On January 8, he defeated Scott D'Amore in Taylor, Michigan. During the next few months, he would also wrestle Bobo Brazil, Jr., Scott Stevens, Andy Fish, Randy Rogers and Mad Man Pondo.

Also that year, Summers formed Hot Paradise with Johnny Paradise and together captured the then unified MCW/BCW Can-Am Tag Team Championship from Canadian Lightning ("Irish" Bobby Clancy & Otis Apollo) at the Public Safety Building in Jackson Center, Ohio on June 4, 1994. Although BCW Commissioner Chuck Fader stripped Hot Paradise of the BCW portion of the tag team titles in January 1995, the two would held the MCW belts for almost two years until losing the titles to The SuperKeys (SuperKey #1 & SuperKey #2) in Jackson Center on April 1. Less than 24 hours after losing the titles, he and Paradise won the belts back in a rematch at the Continental Cablevision studios in Madison Heights, Michigan. They finally lost the titles in an interpromotional "Motor City Wrestling vs. Championship Wrestling Federation" match against CWF Tag Champions The Outlaws (Cowboys Bobby & Woody Lee) at the YMCA Gym in Warren on May 18, 1996. Hot Paradise broke up shortly after losing the MCW tag team titles, their subsequent feud leaving Summers with serious rib and neck injuries, and eventually left the promotion.

=== Later years in the Central States territory (1997–2000) ===
After the promotion's close, he returned to Raymon Downey's World Wrestling Empire where he remained one of its major stars during the final years of its existence. Scott had been the first WWE Heavyweight Champion and may have held the title a record 5-times. He and other former MCW stars also appeared for Rocco Valentino's Oklahoma Professional Wrestling where he feuded with Chief Red Eagle and Renegade until his retirement in 2000.

== Championships and accomplishments ==
- Border City Wrestling

- BCW Can-Am Tag Team Championship (1 time) – with Johnny Paradise

- Central States Wrestling Alliance

- CSWA Heavyweight Championship (1 time, last)

- International Wrestling Alliance
  - IWA Southern Heavyweight Championship (1 time)
- Motor City Wrestling

- MCW Tag Team Championship (2 times) – with Johnny Paradise

- World Wrestling Empire

- WWE Heavyweight Championship (5 times, first)

- Pro Wrestling Illustrated

- PWI ranked him # 324 of the 500 best singles wrestlers of the PWI 500 in 1994
