= Firebreaker Chip =

American retired professional wrestler (born 1963)

Personal information
- Born: Curtis Thompson; January 20, 1963 (age 63) Charlotte, North Carolina, US

Professional wrestling career
- Ring name(s): White Angel; Archangel; Curtis Thompson; Falcon; Firebreaker Chip
- Billed height: 5 ft 11 in (1.80 m)
- Billed weight: 244 lb (111 kg)
- Billed from: Charlotte, North Carolina "WCW Special Forces"
- Debut: 1987
- Retired: 2005

Curtis Thompson (born January 20, 1963) is an American retired professional wrestler. He is best known for his appearances with World Championship Wrestling from 1991 to 1992 under the ring name Firebreaker Chip.

== Professional wrestling career ==
=== Early career (1987–1991) ===
Curtis Thompson started wrestling in 1987 in NWA. Subsequently, he wrestled in the World Wrestling Council in Puerto Rico under a mask as a heel (White Angel) and was betrayed and unmasked by his manager Chicky Starr resulting in a feud including a cage match, in Stampede Wrestling (as the masked Archangel), South Atlantic Pro Wrestling, and in Pacific Northwest Wrestling where he won the NWA Pacific Northwest Heavyweight Championship, defeating Scotty the Body. He formed a tag team with Ricky Santana called the U.S. Males in PNW and won the NWA Pacific Northwest Tag Team Championship. He also wrestled briefly in 1988 as a jobber in the World Wrestling Federation, losing to the likes of Ultimate Warrior and Bad News Brown.

In 1990/1991 Thompson would use the "U.S. Male" gimmick where he wore a mailman uniform to the ring in the United States Wrestling Association (USWA) and South Atlantic Pro Wrestling (SAPW) in the Carolinas as a member of Robert Fuller's Stud Stable. Thompson would eventually free himself from the Stud Stable, turning face in the process at the end of 1990 while wrestling in SAPW. In 1990 he went to North Georgia Wrestling and won a match against Fabulous Fabian (aka Buff Bagwell).

=== World Championship Wrestling (1991–1993, 1997) ===
In 1991 he joined World Championship Wrestling. He became Firebreaker Chip and teamed with Todd Champion as The Patriots. He had the gimmick of being a fireman while teaming with Todd Champion who had the gimmick that he'd returned from Desert Storm and were billed as being from "WCW Special Forces". They feuded with the Fabulous Freebirds and won the WCW United States Tag Team Championship. They next feuded with Steve Armstrong and Tracy Smothers who beat them for the titles.

Thompson and Todd Champion reunited as the Patriots in WCW on December 15, 1997, defeating Samu and Sam Fatu in a dark match for Monday Nitro.

=== Later career (1993–2005) ===
Thompson left WCW in early 1993 and wrestled in the independent promotions and took time to participate in several bodybuilding competitions and came in top three in Mr. North Carolina bodybuilding contest. He also wrestled briefly for Smoky Mountain Wrestling from 1993 to 1995. In 1996 he became the first CWA (Texas) Heavyweight Champion defeating Scott Putski. Later in late 1999, he turned up in the NWA's Mid-Atlantic promotion in a tag team with Drake Dawson called "Triple X". Together they won the NWA World Tag Team Championship and the NWA Mid-Atlantic Tag Team Championship in 2000. Following the disbandment of the tag team, he wrestled in various independent circuits and won some indy heavyweight titles. He retired in 2005, married and now works for JetBlue.

== Championships and accomplishments ==
=== Bodybuilding ===
- Mr. North Carolina (1987)

=== Professional wrestling ===
- Confederate / Continental Wrestling Alliance
  - CWA Heavyweight Championship (1 time, first)
  - CWA Television Championship (1 time)
- International World Class Championship Wrestling
  - IWCCW Television Championship (1 time)
- National Championship Wrestling
  - NCW United States Heavyweight Championship (1 time)
- National Wrestling Alliance
  - NWA World Tag Team Championship (2 times) - with Drake Dawson
- NWA Mid-Atlantic Championship Wrestling^{1}
  - NWA Mid-Atlantic Tag Team Championship (1 time) - with Drake Dawson
  - NWA Northern Continental Tag Team Championship (1 time) - with Drake Dawson
- Pacific Northwest Wrestling
  - NWA Pacific Northwest Heavyweight Championship (1 time)
  - NWA Pacific Northwest Tag Team Championship (1 time) - with Ricky Santana
- Ring Around The Northwest Newsletter
  - Tag Team of the Year (1990) with Ricky Santana
- World Championship Wrestling
  - WCW United States Tag Team Championship (1 time) - with Todd Champion

^{1}This promotion, while operating out of the same area and having begun using some of the same championships, is not the same Mid-Atlantic promotion once owned by Jim Crockett, Jr. That promotion was sold to Ted Turner in November 1988 and was renamed World Championship Wrestling.
