= Salvatore Sincere =

American professional wrestler (born 1966)

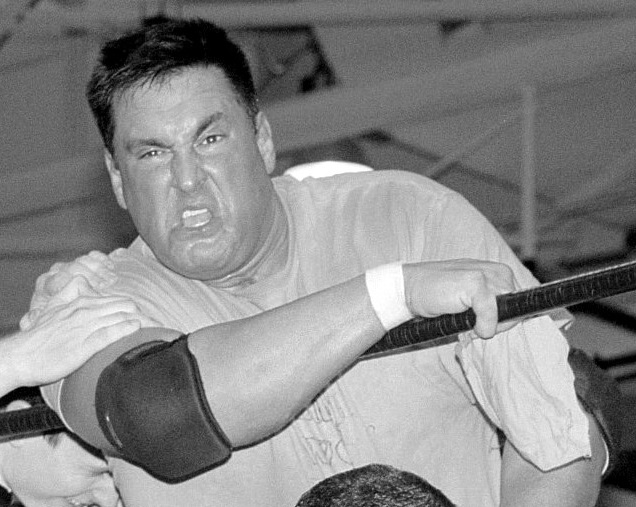
- Sincere in 2009

Personal information
- Born: Thomas Brandi; July 9, 1966 (age 60) Philadelphia, Pennsylvania, U.S.

Professional wrestling career
- Ring name(s): Johnny Gunn; Salvatore Sincere; Tom Brandi; The Patriot
- Billed height: 6 ft 3 in (1.91 m)
- Billed weight: 270 lb (120 kg)
- Billed from: Italy; By way of The Bronx
- Trained by: King Kaluha
- Debut: 1985

Thomas Brandi (born July 9, 1966) is an American professional wrestler. He is best known for his appearances in the World Wrestling Federation from 1996 to 1998 under the ring name Salvatore Sincere and Tom Brandi. Brandi is also known for his appearances with the American Wrestling Federation, World Championship Wrestling and Eastern Championship Wrestling as Johnny Gunn.

== Professional wrestling career ==
=== Early career (1985–1992) ===
Brandi debuted in 1985 after being trained by indy wrestler King Kaluha. His first notoriety came in International World Class Championship Wrestling where he won the IWCCW Television Championship as "Chippendale" Tom Brandi a gimmick similar to the one used by The Fantastics and The Fabulous Ones in the 1980s. In 1988, he worked in Italy.

=== World Championship Wrestling (1992–1993) ===
Brandi joined World Championship Wrestling (WCW) in October 1992, going by the name Johnny Gunn. He achieved some of the most notable moments in his career while teaming with Tom Zenk. At Halloween Havoc 1992, Brandi partnered with Shane Douglas and Tom Zenk to defeat Bobby Eaton, Arn Anderson, and Michael Hayes. The duo next made an appearance on November 6 at a house show in Dalton, GA, defeating the Vegas Connection (Diamond Dallas Page & Vinnie Vegas). At the Clash of the Champions XXI special on November 18, a music vignette was shown with Zenk & Gunn buying clothes. On November 25 in Baltimore, Gunn & Zenk faced The Texicans (Tex Slazenger & Shanghai Pierce) and battled the new team to a draw. The presaged a feud between the two teams; on the December 5th episode of WCW Saturday Night the Texicans made derogatory remarks about Gunn & Zenk. A week later on the program, Zenk & Gunn defeated the Texicans via disqualification. The duo sustained their first loss on December 26, 1992 on WCW Saturday Night when they were defeated by Barry Windham & Brian Pillman.

=== Eastern Championship Wrestling (1993) ===
Brandi later joined Eastern Championship Wrestling and teamed with Tommy Dreamer to capture the ECW Tag Team Championship. They captured the titles from Johnny Hotbody and Tony Stetson in only nine seconds. Less than a month later, the pair would lose the titles to the Tazmaniac and Kevin Sullivan. Having suffered an injury, Gunn was replaced with Shane Douglas for a night, who turned on Dreamer to cost them the tag belts.

=== All Japan Pro Wrestling (1994) ===
In 1994, Brandi as Johnny Gunn worked for All Japan Pro Wrestling where he occasionally teamed with Dory Funk Jr.

=== American Wrestling Federation (1995) ===
In 1995, he competed for the short lived American Wrestling Federation (AWF) on the TV series Warriors of Wrestling where he used the name "Johnny Gunn" and renewed his Chippendales gimmick where he was a fan favorite. Brandi also teamed with Jim Powers while in the AWF.

=== United States Wrestling Federation (1995) ===
In 1995, Brandi won the USWF Championship under the name Johnny Gunn. After losing the championship to his former trainer, King Kaluha, Brandi won the USWF Tag Team Championship from Damage Inc.

=== World Wrestling Federation (1996–1998) ===
He then went to the World Wrestling Federation. He was one of a series of "jobbers with gimmicks" brought into the WWF in 1996 to help elevate the company's stars, alongside Alex "The Pug" Pourteau, Freddie Joe Floyd, the Goon, and T. L. Hopper. He debuted in July 1996 as "Salvatore Sincere," a villainous stereotypical Italian Street thug, a Brother Love inspired character clad in pink and white who falsely claimed to be sincere and to "love" everyone. He appeared at the 1996 Survivor Series and In Your House: It's Time, where he wrestled in dark matches. He also worked matches with some of the WWF's top names at the time, including Shawn Michaels, The Undertaker, and Dwayne Johnson (billed as "Rocky Maivia" during his debut match in the WWF with Salvatore).

He briefly feuded with Marc Mero over valet Sable in 1997. During this storyline, Brandi began wrestling under his given name after Mero called him "that jobber" and said that he was "Tom Brandi", not Salvatore Sincere. Sincere later would go on to win a match against Mero by countout. After going by his real name, he participated in the 1998 Royal Rumble match, lasting a matter of seconds before being eliminated by Cactus Jack and Terry Funk. He lost to Jeff Jarrett in his last televised match on the March 16th, 1998 episode of Monday Night Raw. Brandi left the WWF that April.

=== Independent circuit (1998–present) ===
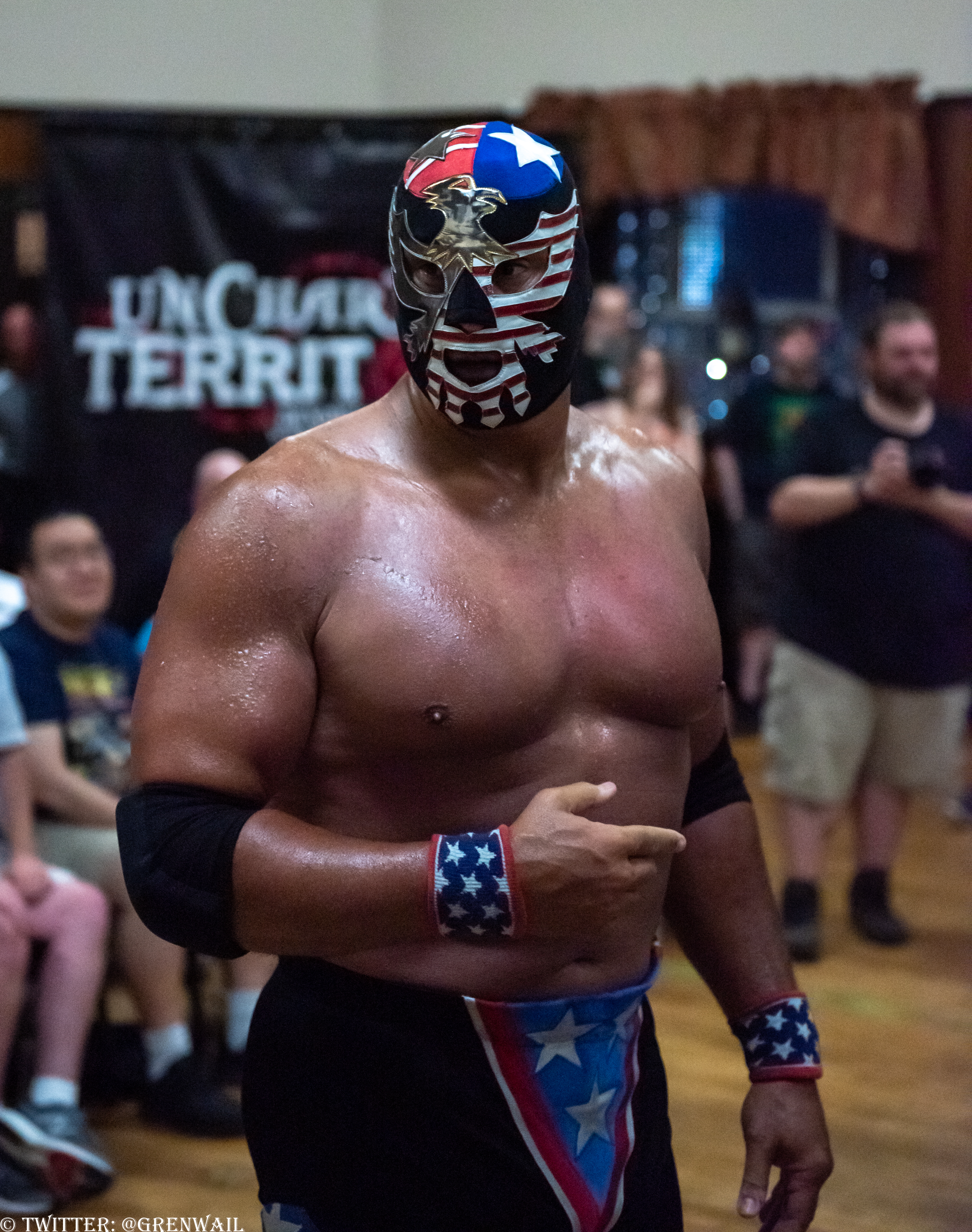
Brandi performing as the Patriot in 2019

Since leaving the WWF, Brandi has wrestled on the independent circuit under both the Brandi and Sincere names, and sometimes wrestles or does autograph signings under a mask as The Patriot, although without the permission of the original Patriot, Del Wilkes. He mainly worked for NWA New Jersey.

In 2025, he was using the Johnny Gunn gimmick he had in ECW.

=== New Japan Pro Wrestling (2025–present) ===
On January 11, 2025, Brandi worked for New Japan Pro Wrestling teaming with Uce Leory as they lost to Horus and Cian Dlevin in Auckland, New Zealand.

== Championships and accomplishments ==
- Americas Wrestling Federation (Puerto Rico)
  - AWF International Heavyweight Championship (1 time)
  - AWF World Junior Heavyweight Championship (1 time)
  - AWF World Tag Team Championship (1 time) - with Ray González
- Big Time Wrestling
  - BTW Heavyweight Championship (1 time)
- Eastern Championship Wrestling
  - ECW Tag Team Championship (1 time) – with Tommy Dreamer
- Devastation Wrestling Federation
  - DWF Heavyweight Championship (1 time)
- Independent Pro Wrestling
  - IPW Americas Championship (1 time)
- Independent Professional Wrestling Alliance
  - IPWA Heavyweight Championship (4 times, final)
- Independent Superstars of Pro Wrestling
  - ISPW Tag Team Championship (1 time) - with The Winner's Club (King Kaluha & Michael Mars)
- Independent Wrestling Alliance
  - IWA Heavyweight Championship (1 time)
- Independent Wrestling Association Mid-South
  - IWA Mid-South Heavyweight Championship (1 time)
- International Pro Wrestling
  - IPW Heavyweight Championship (1 time)
- Empire Wrestling Alliance
  - EWA Heavyweight Championship (1 time)
- International World Class Championship Wrestling
  - IWCCW Television Championship (1 time)
  - IWCCW Tag Team Championship (1 time) – with King Mike Kaluah
- International Wrestling Association
  - IWA United States Heavyweight Championship (1 time)
- National Championship Wrestling
  - NCW United States Heavyweight Championship (1 time)
  - NCW Tag Team Championship (1 time) - with Jimmy Snuka
- NWA 2000
  - NWA National Heavyweight Championship (1 time)
- Pro-Wrestling WORLD-1/Premier Wrestling Federation
  - PWF Universal Tag Team Championship (1 time) – with Mike Kehner
- Pro Wrestling Illustrated
  - PWI ranked him #478 of the 500 best singles wrestlers during the "PWI Years" in 2003
- Steel City Wrestling
  - SCW Heavyweight Championship (1 time)
  - SCW Television Championship (1 time)
- United States Championship Wrestling
  - USCW Pacific Heavyweight Championship (1 time)
- United States Wrestling Federation
  - USWF Heavyweight Championship (1 time)
  - USWF Tag Team Championship (1 time) – with Steve Corino
- Virginia Wrestling Association
  - VWA American Championship (1 time)
- Wrestling Independent Network
  - WIN Atlantic Coast/North American Championship (1 time, final)
- World Wrestling Council
  - WWC Television Championship (1 time)
- Xtreme Maximum Championship Wrestling
  - XMCW Legends And Superstars Championship (1 time)
- Funkdafied Wrestling Federation
  - FWF Heavyweight Championship (1 time)
