= Crybaby Waldo =

American professional wrestler

Personal information
- Born: Walter McDonald; April 21, 1966 Philadelphia, Pennsylvania, United States
- Died: July 28, 2020 (aged 54)

Professional wrestling career
- Ring name(s): Crybaby Waldo; Big Slam Vader; Big Slam
- Billed height: 6 ft 3 in (1.91 m)
- Billed weight: 453 lb (205 kg)
- Debut: 1989
- Retired: 2009

Walt McDonald (April 21, 1966 – July 28, 2020) was an American professional wrestler, better known by his ring name Crybaby Waldo in Extreme Championship Wrestling, Big Slam Vader and Big Slam in the Independent Professional Wrestling Alliance and the independents. He was a one time NWA National Heavyweight Champion.

== Professional wrestling career ==
McDonald made his professional wrestling debut in 1989 for Tri-State Wrestling Alliance in his home state Pennsylvania. In 1992, Joel Goodhart sold Tri-State to Tod Gordon and changed the name to Eastern Championship Wrestling which later became Extreme Championship Wrestling. Waldo wrelsted for ECW during its first year where he feuded Glen Osbourne. Waldo participated in a battle royal in the semi finals for the ECW Heavyweight Championship won by Jimmy Snuka. By the end of 1992, Waldo left ECW and went into the independent circuit.

In 1994, Waldo changed his gimmick and became Big Slam Vader a gimmick that portrayed Big Van Vader. In 1996, he joined IPWA (Independent Professional Wrestling Alliance) based in Virginia. He would win the IPWA Heavyweight Title in 1997. That same he also won the NWA National Heavyweight Championship. When IPWA folded in 2000, Vader returned to the independent circuit until retiring in 2009.

== Death ==
McDonald died on July 28, 2020, from a heart attack. He was 54. His wife announced on social media. McDonald's good friend Count Grog wrote an article om Slam Wrestling about McDonald's passing and the memories.

== Championships and accomplishments ==
- National Wrestling Alliance
  - NWA National Heavyweight Championship (1 time)
- NWA New Jersey
  - NWA New Jersey Heavyweight Championship (1 time)
- Independent Professional Wrestling Alliance
  - IPWA Heavyweight Championship (1 time)
  - IPWA Tag Team Championship with - Chris Stephenson (1 time)
- Southern Championship Wrestling
  - SCW Tag Team Championship (1 time) - with King
