= November to Remember (1996) =

1996 Extreme Championship Wrestling supercard event

- The ECW Arena.
- Promotion: Extreme Championship Wrestling
- Date: November 16, 1996
- City: Philadelphia, Pennsylvania, US
- Venue: ECW Arena
- Attendance: 1,500 (sellout)

Event chronology
← Previous; High Incident	Next → Holiday Hell

November to Remember chronology
← Previous; 1995	Next → 1997

November to Remember (1996) was the fourth November to Remember professional wrestling event produced by Extreme Championship Wrestling (ECW). The event took place on November 16, 1996, in the ECW Arena in Philadelphia, Pennsylvania. This was the biggest ECW show in history at that time and sold out 4 hours in advance, with a legitimate 1,500 fans attending, the largest turnout in company history.

The main event was a tag team match, in which Terry Funk and Tommy Dreamer defeated Shane Douglas and Brian Lee. In the penultimate match, The Sandman defended the ECW World Heavyweight Championship against Raven, with Raven bringing Sandman's ex-wife, Lori, and son, Tyler, to ringside. The infighting between The Dudley Brothers saw Buh Buh Ray Dudley defeat his half-brother, D-Von Dudley.

November to Remember was notable for the debut of The Blue World Order, a parody of the World Championship Wrestling stable The New World Order. The event also featured the final appearance of 2 Cold Scorpio before he joined the World Wrestling Federation (WWF), with Scorpio defeating a series of jobbers in "loser leaves town" matches before being pinned by Louie Spicolli.

== Storylines ==
The event featured wrestlers from pre-existing scripted feuds and storylines. Wrestlers portrayed villains, heroes, or less distinguishable characters in the scripted events that built tension and culminated in a wrestling match or series of matches played out on ECW's television program Hardcore TV.

On the January 30 episode of Hardcore TV, Raven defeated The Sandman to win the ECW World Heavyweight Championship. Raven retained the title against Sandman in several rematches at CyberSlam, Big Ass Extreme Bash and A Matter of Respect, before Sandman ultimately regained the title at Ultimate Jeopardy, where he and Tommy Dreamer defeated Raven's Nest's members Stevie Richards and Brian Lee in an Ultimate Jeopardy match, which stipulated that Sandman would be caned with a Singapore cane if he lost, Lee would be shaved bald if he got pinned and Raven would lose the World Heavyweight Championship if Richards got pinned. Sandman pinned Richards to win the title. At High Incident, Sandman retained the title against 2 Cold Scorpio and then his son Tyler came to the ring to hug him and set him for Raven to attack him with a Singapore cane and hit a Raven Effect. On the November 5 episode of Hardcore TV, it was announced that Sandman would defend the title against Raven in a rematch at November to Remember.

At Fight the Power, Pitbull #2 defeated Shane Douglas to win the ECW World Television Championship, which began a feud between the two over the title. Douglas cost Pitbull #2, the title against Chris Jericho at Hardcore Heaven. At Heat Wave, Douglas defeated Pitbull #2, Jericho and 2 Cold Scorpio in a four-way dance to capture the World Television Championship after The Pitbulls' manager Francine turned on Pitbulls. Douglas and Pitbull #2 continued their feud over the title as Douglas retained the title against Pitbull #2 in a rematch at The Doctor Is In. He then defended the title against Pitbull #2 in another rematch at Ultimate Jeopardy, which ended in a no contest when Douglas blinded him and then crushed Pitbull #1's skull to injure his neck until Tommy Dreamer came to the rescue. Douglas then mocked Pitbull #1's injury at High Incident, which infuriated Pitbull #2 as he attacked Douglas after Douglas retained his title against Cody Michaels but Douglas managed to retreat with Francine. On the November 5 episode of Hardcore TV, it was announced that Pitbull #2 and Douglas would compete in a tag team match at November to Remember with both men picking tag team partners of their choice. Pitbull #2 chose Tommy Dreamer as his tag team partner. Later that night, Brian Lee injured Pitbull #2 by chokeslamming him through a stack of three tables. In the main event, Douglas and Dreamer competed against each other but the match ended in a no contest after Lee hit a Chokeslam to Dreamer. The following week on Hardcore TV, Douglas chose Lee as his tag team partner while Dreamer chose Terry Funk as Pitbull #2's replacement.

At The Doctor Is In, The Gangstas (Mustafa Saed and New Jack) defeated The Eliminators (Saturn and Kronus), The Samoan Gangsta Party (Mack Daddy Kane and Sammy the Silk) and The Bruise Brothers (Don and Ron) in a four-way dance to win the ECW World Tag Team Championship. Gangstas and Eliminators continued their feud over the title as Gangstas retained the title against Eliminators at Natural Born Killaz and Ultimate Jeopardy. On the November 5 episode of Hardcore TV, it was announced that Eliminators would face Rob Van Dam and Sabu at November to Remember, with the winning team earning a title shot at Gangstas later at the event.

D-Von Dudley debuted in ECW as the newest member of the Dudley Brothers at Massacre on Queens Blvd. After initially aiding the Dudleys in their rivalry against The Full Blooded Italians, D-Von began a conflict with the leader of the Dudley family, Big Dick Dudley, over control of the family. This would culminate in D-Von turning on Big Dick and Buh Buh Ray Dudley during their match against the FBI at Hardcore Heaven as he knocked out all the members of the Dudley family with a steel chair. D-Von began feuding with the Dudleys, and both sides interfered in each other's matches and competed in several matches for the next few months. D-Von formed a tag team with Axl Rotten at The Doctor is In, who then joined D-Von in his feud with the Dudleys as the duo lost to Big Dick and Buh Buh Ray at Natural Born Killaz. At Ultimate Jeopardy, D-Von defeated Buh Buh in a singles match. After the match, Big Dick rescued Spike Dudley from Rotten by hitting him with a Moonsault. On the November 5 episode of Hardcore TV, D-Von and Rotten hit Big Dick with a double chair shot, leading to Big Dick attacking D-Von in his locker room, and then D-Von got Big Dick arrested at Joel Gertner's suggestion. This led to a rematch between Buh Buh Ray and D-Von at November to Remember.

== Event ==
=== Preliminary matches ===
The event kicked off with a promo by Taz, in which he announced that ECW would be producing its first pay-per-view event Barely Legal and warned Paul Heyman that he would take on Sabu at Barely Legal. It was followed by the debut of The Blue World Order (Stevie Richards, The Blue Meanie and Super Nova), with Richards, Meanie ad Nova calling themselves "Big Stevie Cool", "The Blue Guy" and "Hollywood Nova" respectively. After a segment in which they promoted the debut of BWO, Stevie defeated David Tyler Morton Jericho in the opening match of the event by executing a Stevie Kick.

In the next match, Axl Rotten took on Hack Meyers. After back and forth action, Rotten executed a double underhook DDT to Meyers on a steel chair for the win.

Next, Buh Buh Ray Dudley took on D-Von Dudley. D-Von controlled the earlier part of the match and made Buh Buh bleed. The action spilled to the ringside where both men brawled into the crowd. The action returned where D-Von attempted to nail Buh Buh with a chair but Buh Buh countered and hit a superplex and a Powerbomb, followed by a splash, which D-Von ducked. D-Von then attempted to nail him with a chair but Buh Buh tossed him into the air and hit a Buh Buh Cutter for the win. After the match, Axl Rotten attacked Buh Buh until Spike Dudley made the save.

Later, Rob Van Dam and Sabu took on The Eliminators (Perry Saturn and John Kronus) to determine the #1 contenders for the World Tag Team Championship later in the show. Both teams exchanged moves and momentum throughout the match. Near the end of the match, Saturn hit a Moonsault on RVD from the second rope to gain a near-fall and then the twenty-minute time limit expired. The ECW Commissioner Tod Gordon restarted the match with extra five minutes. Sabu hit a Moonsault on Kronus to cover him but got a near-fall and then the five minute time limit expired and Saturn demanded five more minutes. After a back and forth action, Sabu and Saturn collided with each other and the time limit once again expired and Gordon then announced that both teams would face The Gangstas (Mustafa Saed and New Jack) for the World Tag Team Championship in a three-way dance later at the event.

In the following match, Mikey Whipwreck took on Chris Candido. Both men traded several moves until Candido caught Whipwreck, who tried a Moonsault on Candido and then Candido delivered a kneeling reverse piledriver, followed by a Blonde Bombshell to get the win.

The Gangstas defended the World Tag Team Championship against The Eliminators and the team of Sabu and Rob Van Dam in a three-way dance. RVD and Sabu controlled the earlier part of the match until Taz interfered in the match to attack Sabu until RVD made the save but Taz choked him out. This allowed Eliminators to gain advantage as they hit a Total Elimination to Sabu to eliminate him and RVD. New Jack then hit a 187 to Saturn to pin him, resulting in Gangstas retaining the title.

The departing 2 Cold Scorpio competed against Devon Storm in a loser leaves town match, which stipulated that the loser would not compete for the next fifteen days. He hit a Tumbleweed to defeat Storm. Scorpio then put up the next challenge with the next losing person being banned to compete for thirty days and J.T. Smith came out to wrestle Scorpio. Smith hit a series of elbow smashes until Scorpio knocked him out with a side slam and a Moonsault. He put up next challenge with the loser being banned from ECW for sixty days and Hack Meyers came out to accept the challenge. Scorpio finished him with a Scorpio Splash and he put up another challenge with the loser being banned from ECW for one year. Louie Spicolli accepted the challenge and hit a Spicolli Driver to defeat Scorpio and force him to leave ECW for one year. After the match, a brawl took place between Taz and Sabu.

=== Main event matches ===
The Sandman defended the World Heavyweight Championship against Raven in the first main event match of November to Remember. During the match, Raven brought out Sandman's wife Lori Fullington and son Tyler Fullington with him at ringside. Despite interference by Blue World Order, Sandman managed to win the match by hitting a DDT on Raven to retain the title.

Next was the main event match in which Terry Funk and Tommy Dreamer took on Shane Douglas and Brian Lee. Beulah McGillicutty showed up at ringside to counter Francine's interference but Douglas took her out with a belly-to-belly suplex. The action continued in the ringside area where Funk hit a Moonsault on the floor. Lee gained control over Dreamer until Funk hit Lee in the knee with a chair and then hit Douglas with the chair as well. Funk applied a spinning toe hold which Lee broke it. Dreamer hit Lee in the head with a television camera and Funk nailed a DDT to Lee for the victory.

== Reception ==
November to Remember 1996 received a huge positive response from the audiences as it had been the most successful event for ECW at that time in terms of revenue and crowd. However, critics gave mixed reviews to the event. Arnold Furious of 411Mania stated "One of those really bad ECW shows where every match was the same shit. Crowd loves the whole thing but I was bored senseless by the repeated garbage spots and lack of variety. Add to that the sheer number of mistakes. This is one of these shows that highlight the kind of constant screw up’s that Sabu would do when he wasn’t feeling terribly motivated. Those tag matches were horrible and there were three tag matches on the same show that followed the exact same ECW “anything goes” formula, which essentially ruined all of them. Aside from a half decent opening match showcasing a younger Kid Kash there really is nothing to see here wrestling wise. Taz is quite entertaining but the thing with Sabu was an ongoing deal so there are other shows that demonstrate that great dynamic they had going on."

Wrestling 20 Years Ago staff gave the event a score rating of 6.5 out of 10 and stated "The BWO debut was fun, and this show is often solid, but there’s nothing in here that was massively memorable or brilliantly done."

== Aftermath ==
2 Cold Scorpio legitimately left ECW after losing the loser leaves town match at November to Remember as he had signed a contract with World Wrestling Federation (WWF), where he debuted the following night at Survivor Series as "Flash Funk". He returned to ECW after his one-year ban was completed at the 1998 House Party event, where he lost to Taz.

Several rivalries from November to Remember continued into ECW's next event Holiday Hell. On the November 26 episode of Hardcore TV, several matches were announced for Holiday Hell including The Sandman defending the title against Raven in a barbed wire match, Shane Douglas and Francine taking on Tommy Dreamer and Beulah McGillicutty and Rob Van Dam facing Taz at the event.

The Gangstas and The Eliminators continued their feud over the World Tag Team Championship, culminating in Eliminators finally beating Gangstas to begin their third tag title reign on the January 4, 1997 episode of Hardcore TV.

The internal feud between the Dudley family finally concluded at Crossing the Line Again when Buh Buh Ray Dudley turned heel by attacking The Sandman after D-Von Dudley lost a match to Sandman. Buh Buh and D-Von then formed the tag team Dudley Boyz, which would go on to become the most decorated tag team in professional wrestling history.

== Results ==
No.	Results	Stipulations	Times
1	Big Stevie Cool (with The Blue Meanie and Super Nova) defeated David Tyler Morton Jericho	Singles match	9:25
2	Axl Rotten defeated Hack Meyers	Singles match	4:25
3	Buh Buh Ray Dudley (with Sign Guy Dudley) defeated D-Von Dudley	Singles match	10:20
4	The Eliminators (Saturn and Kronus) vs. Sabu and Rob Van Dam ended in a time limit draw	Tag team match to determine #1 contenders for the ECW World Tag Team Championship	26:55
5	Chris Candido defeated Mikey Whipwreck	Singles match	11:54
6	The Gangstas (Mustafa and New Jack) (c) defeated The Eliminators (Saturn and Kronus) and Sabu and Rob Van Dam	Three-Way Dance for the ECW World Tag Team Championship	8:54
7	2 Cold Scorpio defeated Devon Storm	Loser leaves town match	1:00
8	2 Cold Scorpio defeated J.T. Smith	Loser leaves town match	0:32
9	2 Cold Scorpio defeated Hack Meyers	Loser leaves town match	1:15
10	Louie Spicolli defeated 2 Cold Scorpio	Loser leaves town match	2:14
11	The Sandman (c) defeated Raven (with Stevie Richards, The Blue Meanie, Super Nova, Lori Fullington and Tyler Fullington)	Singles match for the ECW World Heavyweight Championship	15:07
12	Terry Funk and Tommy Dreamer defeated Shane Douglas and Brian Lee (with Francine)	Tag team match	26:12
(c) / – the champion(s) heading into the match

== See also ==
- 1996 in professional wrestling
