= Big Ass Extreme Bash =

1996 Extreme Championship Wrestling live event

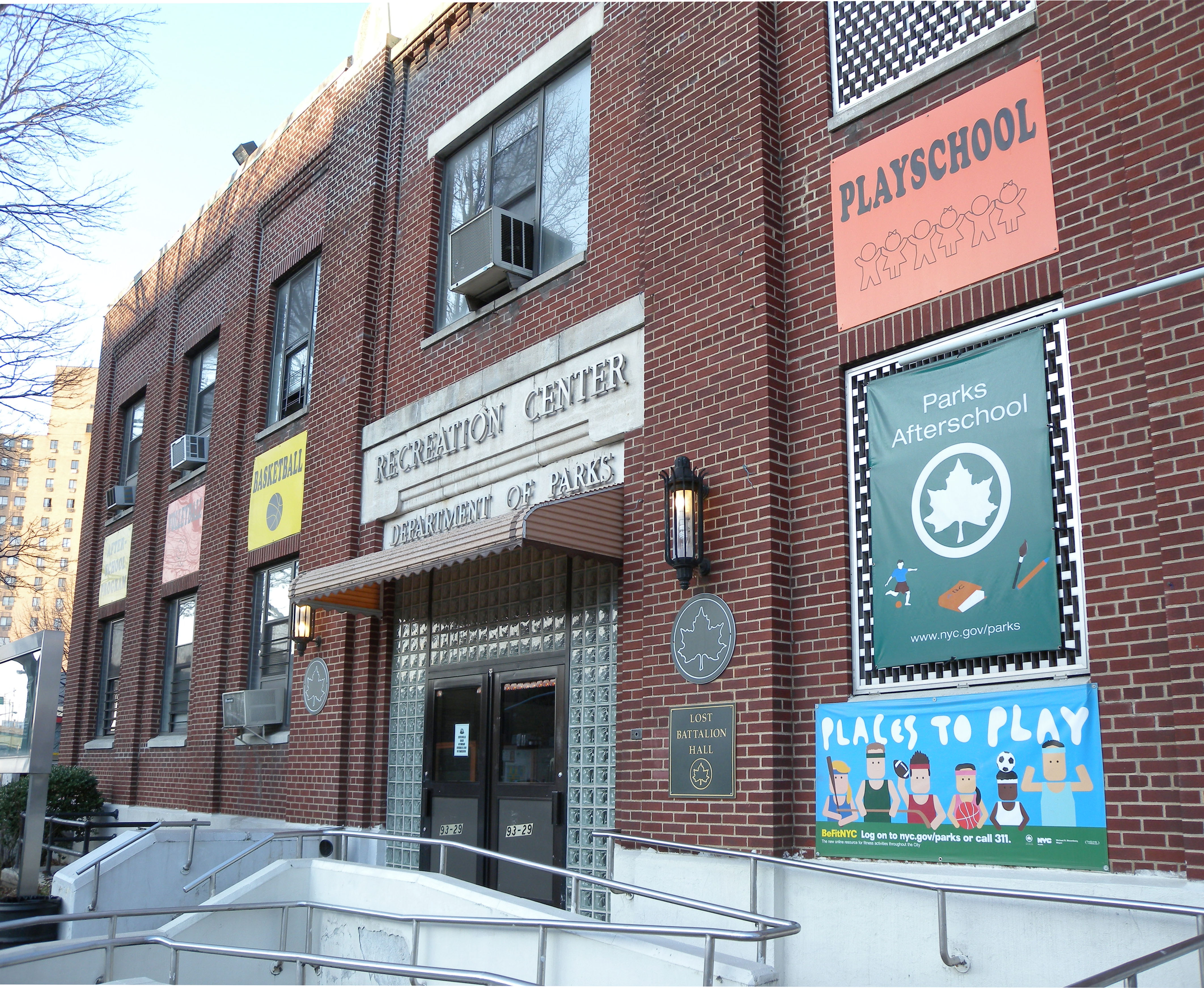
- The Lost Battalion Hall in New York City.
- Promotion: Extreme Championship Wrestling
- Date: March 8, 1996; March 9, 1996 (aired March 12, 19, and 26, 1996)
- City: New York City, New York, US; Philadelphia, Pennsylvania, US
- Venue: Lost Battalion Hall; ECW Arena
- Attendance: c.1,200

Event chronology
| ← Previous; Just Another Night | Next → Massacre on Queens Boulevard |

Big Ass Extreme Bash was a professional wrestling doubleheader live event produced by Extreme Championship Wrestling (ECW) on the weekend of March 8 and March 9, 1996. The March 8 card was held in the Lost Battalion Hall in the Queens neighborhood of New York City, New York in the United States, while the March 9 card was held in the ECW Arena in Philadelphia, Pennsylvania in the United States.

Excerpts from Big Ass Extreme Bash aired on episodes #151, #152, and #153 of the syndicated television show ECW Hardcore TV in March 1996, while an abridged version of the event focused on night two was released on DVD in 2001 and then made available for streaming on the WWE Network in 2020. The bout between Cactus Jack and Chris Jericho was featured on both the 2010 compilation DVD Breaking the Code: Behind the Walls of Chris Jericho and the 2012 compilation DVD ECW Loves New York. The bout between Juventud Guerrera and Rey Misterio Jr. from night two was featured on the 2001 Pioneer Entertainment compilation DVD Hardcore History and the 2011 compilation DVD Rey Mysterio: The Life of a Masked Man, while the bout between Cactus Jack and Mikey Whipwreck was included on the 2007 DVD Mick Foley – Greatest Hits & Misses.

Big Ass Extreme Bash marked the final appearance with ECW of mainstay Cactus Jack before his departure for the World Wrestling Federation, as well as the final appearances of Juventud Guerrera and Rey Misterio Jr. before joining World Championship Wrestling.

Big Ass Extreme Bash was facetiously dedicated to Eugene Moore, who had allegedly attempted to disrupt ECW shows by reporting safety concerns relating to the number of attendees at events in the ECW Arena.

== Event ==
=== Night one ===
My opponent for the first show in Queens was Chris Jericho. [...] The response to me was brutal, even to the point of hurting my feelings...they showered me with everything from full beers to deafening chants of "You sold out."
- Mick "Cactus Jack" Foley

The opening bout of night one was a tag team match in which Chris Michaels and Kendo Nagasaki defeated Damien Stone and Joel Hartgood, with Michaels pinning Stone. After the match, the Sandman came to the ring and caned all the competitors.

Following the opening match, Shane Douglas gave an interview, but was taunted by Brian Pillman who was sitting in the audience, resulting in a brawl. ECW commissioner Tod Gordon then had a confrontation with Bill Alfonso which resulted in Alfonso and Taz attacking Gordon until Bam Bam Bigelow appeared to save him.

The second bout was a singles match between J.T. Smith and Hack Meyers, with Smith winning by pinfall.

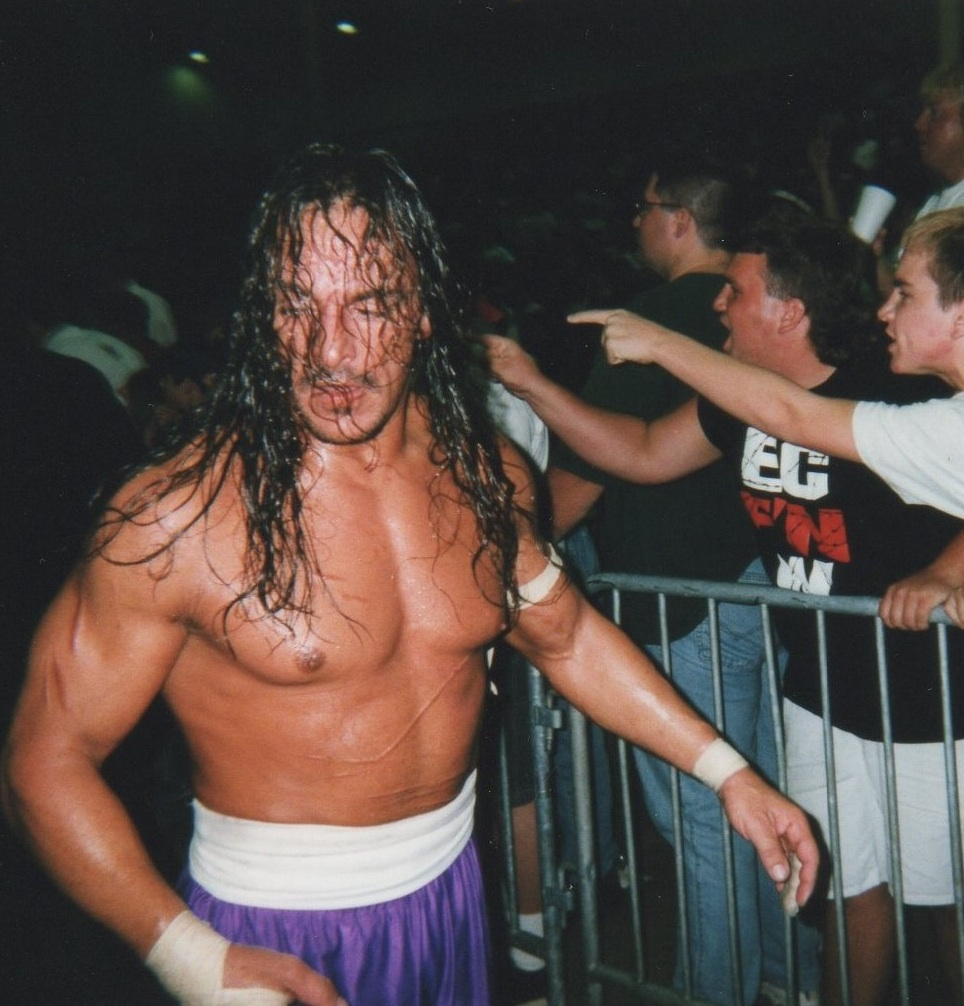
Sabu wrestled 2 Cold Scorpio to a time limit draw on night one of Big Ass Extreme Bash, then defeated Big Titan on night two.

The third bout was a singles match between Cactus Jack and Chris Jericho. Jericho scored an upset victory by pinning Cactus Jack with a bridging German suplex. Following the match, Cactus Jack – who was leaving ECW the following night to join the World Wrestling Federation – attempted to give a farewell speech, but was met with chants of "you sold out".

The fourth match was a singles match between Taz and Mikey Whipwreck, with Taz winning by submission after applying the Tazmission. After the match, Taz refused to relinquish the hold until Bam Bam Bigelow entered the ring; Taz then gave Bigelow a chop block and applied the Tazmission to him.

The fifth bout was a tag team match for the ECW World Tag Team Championship between the Eliminators and the Pitbulls, with the Eliminators winning by pinfall, with Saturn pinning one of the Pitbulls after hitting him with a chain. This marked the end of their feud.

The sixth bout was a two-out-of-three falls match between Juventud Guerrera and Rey Misterio Jr.. Misterio won the first fall by pinfall using an ocean cyclone suplex, but Guerrera went on to win the next two straight falls by pinfall using a dragon suplex and a super brainbuster respectively.

The seventh bout was a singles match in which Big Titan defeated Judge Dredd by pinfall following a piledriver.

The eighth bout saw ECW World Television Champion 2 Cold Scorpio defend his title against Sabu in a rematch from CyberSlam the prior month. The match ended in a time limit draw after 20 minutes.

The penultimate match was a tag team match between the Dudley Brothers and the Headhunters, with Buh Buh Ray Dudley pinning Headhunter B using a small package. Following the match, the Headhunters' manager Damien Kane issued an open challenge which drew out Mustafa and his tag team partner, the returning New Jack, to brawl with the Headhunters.

In the main event of night one, ECW World Heavyweight Champion Raven defended his title against the Sandman. Raven won the match to retain his title after giving the Sandman an Evenflow DDT on a guardrail that the Sandman had brought into the ring. Following the main event, Shane Douglas, the Sandman, and Tommy Dreamer formed a temporary alliance against Raven.

=== Night two ===
I was not mentally prepared for the reaction I received. I couldn't have expected it in my wildest dreams. Fans were clapping, and by the time I got to the ring, every last one was on his feet chanting my name in unison. "Cactus Jack, Cactus Jack." It wasn't the loudest reaction I'd ever heard for a wrestler, but it was damn close.
- Mick "Cactus Jack" Foley

In the opening bout of night two, J.T. Smith pinned Axl Rotten using the ring ropes for leverage.

Following the opening bout, Joey Styles interviewed the Gangstas. New Jack - who had made his return to ECW the prior evening after being absent for several weeks - stated that he had been absent due to being imprisoned and praised ECW. After Damien Kane confronted the Gangstas, New Jack challenged Kane's clients the Headhunters along with 2 Cold Scorpio and the Sandman to a three-way tag team elimination match.

The second match was a tag team match pitting the Bad Crew against Damien Stone and El Puerto Riqueño. The match ended in a no contest after Brian Pillman – accompanied by Philadelphia Eagles offensive tackle Harry Boatswain – came to the ring and attacked the competitors. Pillman then challenged Shane Douglas, only to run away when Douglas came to the ring.

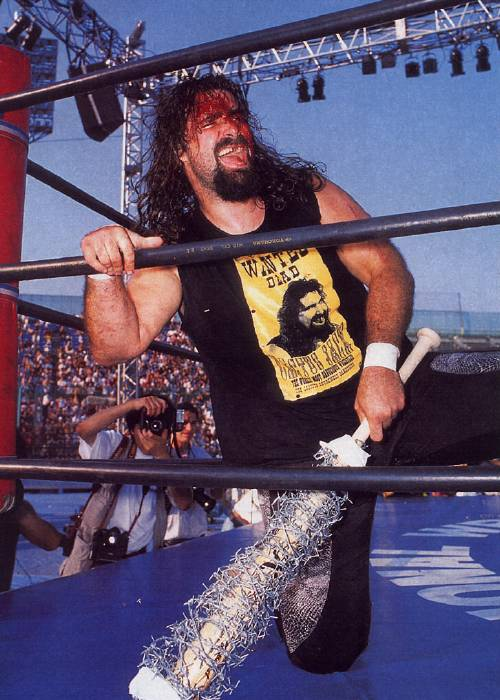
Cactus Jack made his final appearance for ECW at Big Ass Extreme Bash.

In the third match, ECW World Tag Team Champions the Eliminators defeated Buh Buh Ray Dudley and Hack Meyers (substituting for Dances with Dudley) to retain their titles after performing Total Elimination on Meyers and then pinning him.

The four bout was a singles match between Chris Jericho and Taz. Taz defeated Jericho by submission using the Tazmission, but the result was overturned to a win by disqualification for Jericho after Taz refused to release the hold. After the match, there was another altercation between Douglas and Pillman.

The fifth bout was a two-out-of-three falls match between Juventud Guerrera and Rey Misterio Jr. in a rematch from the previous night that was also both men's final appearance with ECW before leaving to join World Championship Wrestling. Guerrera won the first fall by pinfall using a dragon suplex, then Misterio won the second fall using a gutwrench powerbomb. Misterio went on to win the third fall and the match after reversing an attempted sitout crucifix powerbomb into a rana.

The sixth bout was a singles match between Cactus Jack and Mikey Whipwreck, who had begun feuding when Cactus Jack turned on Whipwreck after they lost the ECW World Tag Team Championship the previous month. Cactus Jack, who was making his final appearance with ECW before joining the World Wrestling Federation as Mankind, receiving a standing ovation upon entering in stark contrast to his reception the prior night. The match was a wild brawl during which Cactus Jack debuted his new finishing move, the Mandible Claw. The match ended after Cactus Jack delivered a piledriver onto a steel chair to Whipwreck and then pinned him. Following the match, Cactus Jack hugged Mikey and gave a farewell speech, then performed the can-can with the Blue Meanie and Stevie Richards to the theme from New York, New York before performing the "Fargo strut" back to the locker room to another standing ovation. Cactus Jack later described it as "the greatest wrestling send-off I'd ever seen."

The seventh bout was a tag team match between the Bruise Brothers and the Pitbulls. The match ended in a no contest after Raven's Nest and then Tommy Dreamer interfered.

The eighth bout was a singles match between Big Titan and Sabu. Sabu won by pinfall after an Arabian Facebuster.

The penultimate match saw ECW World Heavyweight Champion Raven defend his title against Shane Douglas. Raven won the bout by pinfall after delivering an Evenflow DDT onto a steel chair.

The main event of night two was a three-way tag team elimination match between the Gangstas, the Headhunters, and 2 Cold Scorpio and The Sandman. The Headhunters were the first team eliminated after 2 Cold Scorpio pinned a Headhunter following a 450° splash. The Sandman then brawled backstage with The Headhunters, leaving 2 Cold Scorpio alone with the Gangstas. The Gangstas went on to pin 2 Cold Scorpio following a diving headbutt from New Jack.

== Results ==
=== Night one ===
| No. | Results | Stipulations | Times |
|---|---|---|---|
| 1 | Chris Michaels and Kendo Nagasaki defeated Damien Stone and Joel Hartgood by pinfall | Tag team match | 1:31 |
| 2 | J.T. Smith defeated Hack Meyers by pinfall | Singles match | 2:47 |
| 3 | Chris Jericho defeated Cactus Jack (with the Blue Meanie and Stevie Richards) by pinfall | Singles match | 13:55 |
| 4 | Taz (with Bill Alfonso) defeated Mikey Whipwreck by submission | Singles match | 4:12 |
| 5 | The Eliminators (Kronus and Saturn) (c) defeated the Pitbulls (Pitbull #1 and Pitbull #2) (with Francine) by pinfall | Tag team match for the ECW World Tag Team Championship | 14:06 |
| 6 | Juventud Guerrera defeated Rey Misterio Jr. by pinfall | Two-out-of-three falls match | 16:26 |
| 7 | Big Titan defeated Judge Dredd by pinfall | Singles match | 3:42 |
| 8 | 2 Cold Scorpio (c) vs. Sabu ended in a time limit draw | Singles match for the ECW World Television Championship | 20:00 |
| 9 | The Dudley Brothers (Buh Buh Ray Dudley and Dances with Dudley) (with Big Dick Dudley and Sign Guy Dudley) defeated the Headhunters (Headhunter A and Headhunter B) (with Damien Kane and Lady Alexandra) by pinfall | Tag team match | 2:36 |
| 10 | Raven (c) (with the Blue Meanie, Kimona Wanalaya, and Stevie Richards) defeated The Sandman (with Missy Hyatt) by pinfall | Singles match for the ECW World Heavyweight Championship | 12:27 |
(c) / – the champion(s) heading into the match

=== Night two ===
| No. | Results | Stipulations | Times |
|---|---|---|---|
| 1 | J.T. Smith defeated Axl Rotten by pinfall | Singles match | 6:50 |
| 2 | The Bad Crew (Dog and Rose) vs. Damien Stone and El Puerto Riqueño ended in a no contest | Tag team match | 1:48 |
| 3 | The Eliminators (Kronus and Saturn) (c) defeated Buh Buh Ray Dudley and Hack Meyers (with Big Dick Dudley, Chubby Dudley, and Sign Guy Dudley) by pinfall | Tag team match for the ECW World Tag Team Championship | 8:15 |
| 4 | Chris Jericho defeated Taz (with Bill Alfonso) by disqualification | Singles match | 6:00 |
| 5 | Rey Misterio Jr. defeated Juventud Guerrera by pinfall | Two-out-of-three falls match | 15:57 |
| 6 | Cactus Jack defeated Mikey Whipwreck by pinfall | Singles match | 17:18 |
| 7 | The Bruise Brothers (Don Bruise and Ron Bruise) vs. the Pitbulls (Pitbull #1 and Pitbull #2) (with Francine) ended in a no contest | Tag team match | 16:58 |
| 8 | Sabu defeated Big Titan by pinfall | Singles match | 12:18 |
| 9 | Raven (c) (with the Blue Meanie, Kimona Wanalaya, and Stevie Richards) defeated Shane Douglas by pinfall | Singles match for the ECW World Heavyweight Championship | 8:40 |
| 10 | The Gangstas (Mustafa and New Jack) defeated the Headhunters (Headhunter A and Headhunter B) (with Damian Kane and Lady Alexandra) and 2 Cold Scorpio and the Sandman (with Missy Hyatt) by pinfall | Three-way tag team elimination match | 14:22 |
(c) / – the champion(s) heading into the match
