= Hardcore Heaven (1996) =

1996 Extreme Championship Wrestling supercard event

- The ECW Arena.
- Promotion: Extreme Championship Wrestling
- Date: June 22, 1996 (aired June 25, July 2, and July 9, 1996)
- City: Philadelphia, Pennsylvania, United States
- Venue: ECW Arena
- Attendance: 1,250

Event chronology
← Previous; Fight the Power	Next → Heat Wave

Hardcore Heaven chronology
← Previous; 1995	Next → 1997

Hardcore Heaven (1996) was the third Hardcore Heaven professional wrestling event produced by Extreme Championship Wrestling (ECW). The event was a supercard that took place on June 22, 1996, in the ECW Arena in Philadelphia, Pennsylvania.

Ten professional wrestling matches were contested on the card. In the main event, Sabu defeated Rob Van Dam in their third singles encounter after trading wins in highly acclaimed matches earlier in the year. On the undercard, Tommy Dreamer defeated Brian Lee in a weapons match, Raven defeated Terry Gordy to retain the ECW World Heavyweight Championship, Chris Jericho defeated Pitbull #2 to capture the ECW World Television Championship, marking Jericho's first championship win in the United States, and Taz faced mixed martial artist Paul Varelans in a bout, which was promoted as being a legitimate contest. The match has been described as "at least partly a shoot".

Excerpts from Hardcore Heaven aired on episodes #166, #167, and #168 of the syndicated television show ECW Hardcore TV on June 25, July 2, and July 9, 1996.

== Storylines ==
The event featured wrestlers from pre-existing scripted feuds and storylines. Wrestlers portrayed villains, heroes, or less distinguishable characters in the scripted events that built tension and culminated in a wrestling match or series of matches played out on ECW's television program Hardcore TV.

At Hostile City Showdown, Sabu defeated Rob Van Dam in their first ever singles match against each other. The match was very well received by the audience, who gave a standing ovation to both competitors and Sabu helped RVD to get off his feet and offered a handshake but RVD disrespected him by refusing the handshake. The two men fought in a rematch at A Matter of Respect, where RVD defeated Sabu and insulted him after the match. On the June 11 episode of Hardcore TV, it was announced that Sabu would face RVD in a third match at Hardcore Heaven.

At Fight the Power, Taz defeated Muay Thai fighter Jason Helton in a shoot fight to get a quick submission victory and then Ultimate Fighting Championship mixed martial artist Paul Varelans made his ECW debut and accepted Taz's open challenge for a fight. Taz insulted Varelans and the two nearly got involved into a brawl until referees separated the two. On the June 11 episode of Hardcore TV, a contract was signed for a match between Taz and Varelans at Hardcore Heaven.

At Hostile City Showdown, Tommy Dreamer lost to Raven's newest associate Brian Lee in a match after interference by The Bruise Brothers (Don Bruise and Ron Bruise). The feud continued as Dreamer and Lee competed in six-man tag team matches with different partners. On the June 11 episode of Hardcore TV, it was announced during the Hype Central segment that Dreamer would compete against Lee in a weapons match at Hardcore Heaven.

At A Matter of Respect, Shane Douglas defeated 2 Cold Scorpio to win the World Television Championship. Douglas was scheduled to defend the title against Scorpio at Fight the Power but Scorpio was hospitalized due to fever and then he defeated El Puerto Riqueño, Don E. Allen, Devon Storm and Mikey Whipwreck in a quick succession until he insulted Pitbull #2, who along with a bunch of wrestlers was carrying away the defeated wrestlers. Douglas also insulted Pitbull's valet Francine, who slapped Douglas and he retaliated by hitting her with a belly-to-back suplex. Pitbull then defeated Douglas in an impromptu match to win the title. On the June 18 episode of Hardcore TV, it was announced that Pitbull #2 would defend the title against Chris Jericho and Douglas would face Mikey Whipwreck at Hardcore Heaven.

At Fight the Power, The Samoan Gangsta Party (Matty Smalls and Sammy the Silk) made their ECW debut during The Eliminators' (John Kronus and Perry Saturn) World Tag Team Championship defense against The Gangstas (New Jack and Mustafa Saed) and attacked Gangstas, thus costing them the title shot. On the June 18 episode of Hardcore TV, it was announced that Gangstas would receive another title shot against Eliminators at Hardcore Heaven, which would be their last chance at the titles. It was also announced on the same episode that Samoan Gangsta Party would make their in-ring debut at the event.

== Event ==
=== Preliminary matches ===
In the opening match, Shane Douglas took on Mikey Whipwreck. After a back and forth contest, Douglas executed a belly-to-belly suplex for the win. After the match, Stevie Richards impersonated Baron von Raschke as "Baron von Stevie" and The Blue Meanie impersonated Goldust as "Bluedust" in an in-ring interview with Joey Styles.

In the next match, The Full Blooded Italians (J.T. Smith and Little Guido) took on The Dudleys (Big Dick Dudley and Buh Buh Ray Dudley). Before the match started, Smith brought out the returning Salvatore Bellomo as the newest member of the F.B.I., who would manage them at ringside. Bellomo's repeated interference resulted in Big Dick carrying him away to the backstage and then D-Von Dudley interrupted the match and hit Guido with a steel chair, thus getting Dudleys disqualified. As Big Dick came back to the ring, D-Von retreated and escaped in a car.

Next, Taz took on Ultimate Fighting Championship (UFC) mixed martial artist Paul Varelans. The referee was distracted enough for Perry Saturn to dropkick Varelans in the back of the head on the top rope, allowing Taz to nail a T-Bone Taz-Plex and he applied a Tazmission to gain a submission victory over Varelans.

Next, Raven was scheduled to defend the World Heavyweight Championship against IWA Japan's handpicked wrestler. Before the match, Raven, Stevie Richards and Super Nova mocked The Sandman by bringing out his wife Peaches, who dropped to her knees in front of Raven. Sandman then came and told that he did not care as he had already pimped her out. Raven's challenger was then revealed to be Terry Gordy. The match was filled with interference by Raven's Nest members, The Sandman and Tommy Dreamer. Stevie Richards ultimately hit a Stevie Kick to Gordy, allowing Raven to execute a DDT to retain the title. After the match, Raven's Nest attacked Dreamer and Gordy until Sandman made the save and then Peaches came to the ring and brought out her son Tyler along with her, who claimed that he worshipped Raven and Raven took them to the backstage and Sandman followed them to the backstage.

Next, The Eliminators (Saturn and Kronus) defended the World Tag Team Championship against The Gangstas (New Jack and Mustafa Saed), in which Gangstas had their last chance for the tag team titles. However, Gangstas were attacked by The Samoan Gangsta Party (Matty Smalls and Sammy the Silk) in the aisle during their entrance to the ring and then the match was thrown out. The Bruise Brothers (Don Bruise and Ron Bruise) joined Samoan Gangsta Party in taking out Gangstas and substituted for Gangstas. However, the match never went underway as Gangstas came back to brawl and four teams brawled with each other at the ringside area.

This was followed by Samoan Gangsta Party making their in-ring debut in ECW against Axl Rotten and Hack Meyers. The match ended in a no contest after The Gangstas interfered to attack Samoan Gangsta Party. The Eliminators and Bruise Brothers also joined the brawl and all four teams brawled with each other.

Next, Pitbull #2 defended the World Television Championship against Chris Jericho. Shane Douglas came at ringside and grabbed Pitbull's valet Francine. Pitbull tried to make the save with a clothesline to Douglas but Douglas put Francine in place of him. Pitbull #1 came to the ringside and took Francine to the backstage. Jericho hit a hurricanrana from the top rope to Pitbull #2 to win the title.

This was followed by the penultimate match, a weapons match between Tommy Dreamer and Brian Lee. Beulah McGillicutty prevented Lee from hitting Dreamer with a cinder block and Lee tried to hit a Primetime Slam to Beulah until Kimona Wanalaya distracted him enough for Beulah to hit him with a frying pan and Dreamer hit him with a stop sign in the head and executed a DDT on the sign to win the match. After the match, Bruise Brothers attacked Dreamer and Lee executed a Primetime Slam to Dreamer through a stack of three tables. The ring collapsed following the match, resulting in the main event being delayed by an hour until it could be repaired. During the interval, Kimona performed a striptease in the Eagle's Nest box to pacify the audience.

=== Main event match ===
Sabu took on Rob Van Dam in their third consecutive singles encounter. After a back and forth match between the two men, Sabu nailed an Arabian Facebuster to win the match. Both men were taken out on stretchers after the match.

== Reception ==
Hardcore Heaven received mostly positive reviews from critics. Arnold Furious of Wrestling Recaps gave the event a score rating of 8 out of 10 by stating "What was one of the greatest hyped shows up to this point in ECW history really just didn’t live up to the hype. It was clear that ECW just wasn’t ready for PPV yet. The ability to build up the shows was there. This show was masterfully built up. You could tell with the build up to this show that ECW was aiming for PPV. The pieces were there for ECW, but with this show it was clear that they still had a bit of developing to do before they hit the big dance. Some of the undercard stuff on this show was total garbage. The Shane vs Mikey match quite possibly could have been the match of the night. The main event matches were decent. The Terry Gordy match was good. The Shoot fight was underwhelming but still wildly interesting considering the behind the scenes stuff behind it. Sabu vs Van Dam was a really good match too. All in all this show was pretty good and had a lot of great moments. Some of the undercard stuff keeps me from giving it anything higher than an 8, but I would still highly recommend this show if your interested or curious about ECW."

Crazy Max staff considered it "Another awesome ECW Arena show here. Top to bottom great action", with "The shoot fight delivered in it’s[sic] short time but as a whole storyline was really good". They further added "New TV Champion in Jericho, Dreamer takes a SICK bump and Sabu and Van Dam have another really good match. A must see show!"

Wrestling 20 Years Ago staff rated it 6.5 out of 10, with "The superb TV Title match is a must. The opener is a lot of fun. Despite all the issues detailed above, there is much to credit the main event. You also simply have to make time in your life for the brilliance of Stevie Richards. I wouldn't recommend Taz - Paul Varelans for anything other than morbid fascination however..."

The Wrestling Revolution staff however gave negative reviews, stating "Overall, a very bad show from ECW. Too many short matches, ultra-long schmozzes, and non-match segments just dragging on for WAY too long."

== Aftermath ==
Raven and The Sandman continued their intense feud as it grew personal due to Raven occupying Sandman's wife and son and turning them against him. On the July 2 episode of Hardcore TV, it was announced that Sandman, Dreamer and Gordy would take on Raven, Lee and Richards in a triple fight steel cage match at Heat Wave, with the World Heavyweight Championship on the line and the title would change hands if Richards would be pinned. At the event, Sandman pinned Raven and not Richards, therefore Raven retained the title.

On the June 25 episode of Hardcore TV, it was announced that Chris Jericho would defend the World Television Championship against former champions Shane Douglas, 2 Cold Scorpio and Pitbull #2 in a four-way dance at Heat Wave, where Douglas won the title.

A match was made between The Gangstas and Samoan Gangsta Party on the July 9 episode of Hardcore TV, with both teams meeting at Heat Wave where the match ended in a no contest due to constant brawling between both teams. After the match, Gangstas issued a challenge to The Eliminators for the World Tag Team Championship in a match which would also involve Samoan Gangsta Party and The Bruise Brothers. Eliminators accepted the title shot and the match happened at The Doctor is In, where Gangstas won the title.

Sabu and Rob Van Dam continued their feud as the two competed in a stretcher match at The Doctor is In, which Sabu won to end the feud.

== Results ==
No.	Results	Stipulations	Times
1	Shane Douglas defeated Mikey Whipwreck	Singles match	11:33
2	The Full Blooded Italians (J.T. Smith and Little Guido) (with Salvatore Bellomo) defeated The Dudleys (Big Dick Dudley and Buh Buh Ray Dudley) (with Chubby Dudley, Sign Guy Dudley and Dances with Dudley) by disqualification	Tag team match	10:10
3	Taz (with Bill Alfonso, The Eliminators, Rob Van Dam and Shane Douglas) defeated Paul Varelans by submission	Singles match	2:24
4	Raven (c) (with Stevie Richards, Super Nova and The Blue Meanie) defeated Terry Gordy	Singles match for the ECW World Heavyweight Championship	12:45
5	The Eliminators (Kronus and Saturn) (c) vs. The Gangstas (New Jack and Mustafa Saed) ended in a no-contest	Tag team match for the ECW World Tag Team Championship	8:16
6	The Eliminators (Kronus and Saturn) (c) vs. The Bruise Brothers (Don Bruise and Ron Bruise) ended in a no-contest	Tag team match for the ECW World Tag Team Championship	—
7	Axl Rotten and Hack Meyers vs. The Samoan Gangsta Party (Matty Smalls and Sammy the Silk) ended in a no-contest	Tag team match	2:00
8	Chris Jericho defeated Pitbull #2 (c) (with Francine)	Singles match for the ECW World Television Championship	12:10
9	Tommy Dreamer (with Beulah McGillicutty and Kimona Wanalaya) defeated Brian Lee	Weapons match	9:02
10	Sabu defeated Rob Van Dam	Singles match	20:00
(c) / – the champion(s) heading into the match

== See also ==
- 1996 in professional wrestling
