= ECW Fight the Power =

1996 Extreme Championship Wrestling supercard event

Fight the Power
- The ECW Arena.
- Promotion: Extreme Championship Wrestling
- Date: June 1, 1996 (aired June 4, June 11, and June 18, 1996)
- City: Philadelphia, Pennsylvania, US
- Venue: ECW Arena
- Attendance: c. 1,025

Event chronology
← Previous; A Matter of Respect	Next → Hardcore Heaven

Fight the Power was a professional wrestling live event produced by Extreme Championship Wrestling (ECW) on June 1, 1996. The event was held in the ECW Arena in Philadelphia, Pennsylvania in the United States. Excerpts from Fight the Power aired on the June 4, June 11, and June 18 episodes of the syndicated television show ECW Hardcore TV.

== Event ==
Fight the Power was attended by approximately 1,025 people. The commentator for the event was Joey Styles. The referees were Jim Molineaux, John Finnegan, John Moore, and Paul Richards.

The first bout was a singles match between Devon Storm and El Puerto Riqueño. Storm won the match by pinfall following a diving bulldog.

The second bout was a singles match between Mikey Whipwreck and Rob Van Dam. At the outset of the match, Brian Pillman - who had begun disrupting ECW events by behaving erratically - came to ringside in a wheelchair and inexplicably demanded the match be stopped, then hit Whipwreck with his crutch after Whipwreck confronted him. Van Dam went on to win the match by pinfall following a standing moonsault. Following the match, Pillman gave a promo in which he referred to the African American tag team the Gangstas as "Niggas With Attitudes", legitimately angering them.

The third bout was a tag team match between the Dudley Boyz and the Full Blooded Italians in a follow-up to their confrontation at Massacre on Queens Boulevard in April 1995. The Full Blooded Italians won by disqualification after D-Von Dudley gave the referee a chair shot. Following the match, D-Von Dudley attacked Buh Buh Ray Dudley and the other Dudley Brothers at ringside (Chubby Dudley, Dances with Dudley, and Sign Guy Dudley), giving them all chair shots. After D-Von Dudley had left, Big Dick Dudley made his return, helping the other Dudley Brothers up and handing Chubby Dudley his box of donut holes.

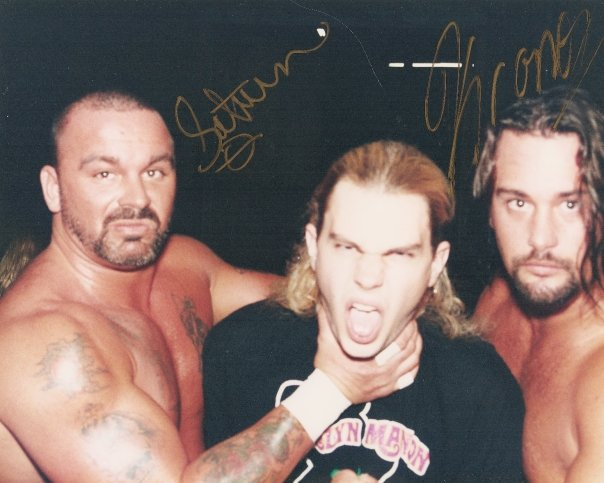
ECW World Tag Team Champions The Eliminators (Saturn (left) and Kronus (right)) successfully defended their titles in the main event of Fight the Power.

Following the third bout, Joey Styles interviewed Raven and Stevie Richards in the ring. Richards announced that Raven had instructed him to find the "dirtiest skank" he could for Raven. Richards then introduced Divine Brown (who had been arrested for prostitution the prior year). Brown offered to do "anything" to Raven but he rejected her offer, saying "she hasn't been with enough people yet", after which Richards himself carried Brown backstage.

The fourth bout was a "shoot fight" between Jason Helton (a Muay Thai fighter) and Taz, with the rules being that the only way to win was by knockout or submission. Taz won the match by submission using the Tazmission. Following the match, Taz brawled with mixed martial artist Paul Varelans, who was seated at ringside, setting up a bout between them at Hardcore Heaven later that month.

The fifth bout was a falls count anywhere six-man tag team elimination match pitting Raven's Nest members Brian Lee and the Bruise Brothers against The Pitbulls and Tommy Dreamer. Pitbull #1 (who went into the match with an injured arm) was the first wrestler eliminated, being pinned by Lee after having his crotch repeatedly driven into the ring post. Lee and Dreamer fought on the balcony of the ECW Arena known as the "crow's nest", with Lee chokeslamming Dreamer off the balcony through a stack of tables in a spot that was repeatedly played on ECW programming in the following years. After rallying, Dreamer pinned one of the Bruise Brothers following a DDT. The Pitbulls then attempted to superbomb Dreamer through Lee (who was lying on top of a table), only for the remaining Bruise Brother to pull Lee out of the way. Lee then pinned Dreamer, leaving Pitbull #2 alone. Pitbull #2 went on to pin Lee after the remaining Bruise Brother accidentally gave him a big boot, then pinned the remaining Bruise Brother with a small package following a DDT from Dreamer.

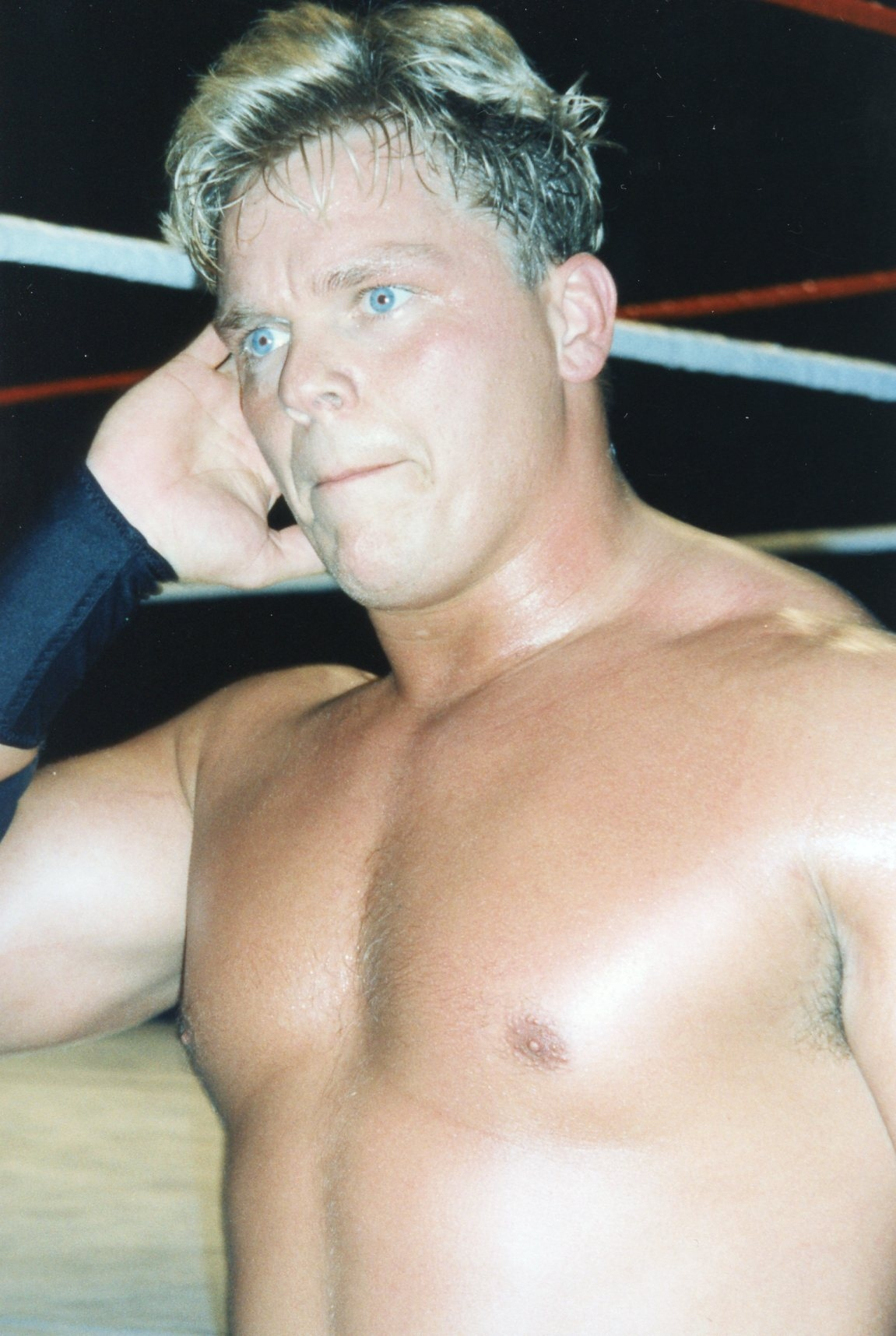
ECW World Television Champion Shane Douglas wrestled five matches at Fight the Power.

As a result of winning the match, Pitbull #2 was to receive a future title shot against ECW World Heavyweight Champion Raven. As the Bruise Brothers and Lee attacked Pitbull #2, Raven came to the ring and announced that the match would take place immediately. Raven went on to pin Pitbull #2 to retain his title following an Evenflow DDT onto a chair.

The seventh bout was a singles match between the Sandman and Stevie Richards. Richards and his henchman the Blue Meanie - who regularly impersonated other wrestlers - came to the ring dressed as World Championship Wrestling tag team the Blue Bloods. Richards - who had announced earlier that year at Big Apple Blizzard Blast that he intended to sue the Sandman's valet Missy Hyatt for sexual harassment for kissing him the previous December at Holiday Hell - then served Hyatt by stuffing the summons into her cleavage. Subsequently, a doctor who had recently operated on the Sandman's injured knee came to the ring. After the doctor refused to clear the Sandman to wrestle, Hyatt kissed him, causing him to faint and thus allowing the match to commence. The Sandman went on to win the match by pinfall using a small package. Following the match, Raven attacked the Sandman, applying a figure-four leglock to his injured knee while hitting him with a Singapore cane.

Following the seventh bout, the Gangstas gave a promo in which New Jack criticized Pillman, accusing him of having had a homosexual relationship with his former tag team partner Tom Zenk, and criticized other gimmicks that he considered racist, such as the World Wrestling Federation's Gangstas in Paradise and World Championship Wrestling's Z-Gangsta.

The eighth bout was scheduled to be ECW World Television Champion Shane Douglas defending his title against 2 Cold Scorpio, but 2 Cold Scorpio had been hospitalized due to a staph infection. Douglas instead issued an open challenge. He went on to win four matches in quick succession, pinning El Puerto Riqueño, Don E. Allen, and Devon Storm following belly-to-back suplexes, and defeating Mikey Whipwreck by submission using the Texas cloverleaf. As Pitbull #2 help carry the defeated wrestlers backstage, Douglas challenged him, asking "are you a Pitbull or a pussy?" After Pitbull #2 demurred, Douglas taunted Pitbull #2's manager, Francine, calling her the "ugliest bitch" in ECW. After Francine slapped Douglas, he gave her a belly-to-belly suplex, prompting an enraged Pitbull #2 to attack him. Pitbull #2 went on to win the impromptu match, pinning Douglas after reversing a super belly-to-belly suplex into a superbomb, therefore becoming the new ECW World Television Champion.

The main event saw ECW World Tag Team Champions the Eliminators defend their titles again the Gangstas. During the match, the debuting Gangstas in Paradise attacked the Gangstas. The Eliminators went on to win the bout to retain their titles, pinning New Jack following Total Elimination.

== Results ==
No.	Results	Stipulations	Times
1	Devon Storm (with Damien Kane and Lady Alexandra) defeated El Puerto Riqueño by pinfall	Singles match	—
2	Rob Van Dam defeated Mikey Whipwreck by pinfall	Singles match	—
3	The Full Blooded Italians (J.T. Smith and Little Guido) defeated the Dudley Boyz (Buh Buh Ray Dudley and D-Von Dudley) (with Chubby Dudley, Dances with Dudley, and Sign Guy Dudley) by disqualification	Tag team match	—
4	Taz (with Bill Alfonso and Team Taz) defeated Jason Helton via submission	"Shoot fight"	—
5	The Pitbulls (Pitbull #1 and Pitbull #2) (with Francine) and Tommy Dreamer (with Beulah McGillicutty and Kimona Wanalaya) defeated Brian Lee and the Bruise Brothers (Don Bruise and Ron Bruise) by pinfall	Falls count anywhere six-man tag team elimination match	—
6	Raven (c) defeated Pitbull #2 (with Francine) by pinfall	Singles match for the ECW World Heavyweight Championship	10:38
7	The Sandman (with Missy Hyatt) defeated Stevie Richards (with the Blue Meanie) by pinfall	Singles match	2:10
8	Shane Douglas (c) defeated El Puerto Riqueño by pinfall	Singles match for the ECW World Television Championship	—
9	Shane Douglas (c) defeated Don E. Allen by pinfall	Singles match for the ECW World Television Championship	—
10	Shane Douglas (c) defeated Devon Storm by pinfall	Singles match for the ECW World Television Championship	—
11	Shane Douglas (c) defeated Mikey Whipwreck by submission	Singles match for the ECW World Television Championship	—
12	Pitbull #2 (with Francine) defeated Shane Douglas (c) by pinfall	Singles match for the ECW World Television Championship	—
13	The Eliminators (Kronus and Saturn) (c) defeated the Gangstas (Mustafa and New Jack) by pinfall	Tag team match for the ECW World Tag Team Championship	—
(c) / – the champion(s) heading into the match
