= Bad Crew =

Professional wrestling tag team

Tag team
- Members: Bad Crew #1 / Dog / Jake; Bad Crew #2 / Rose / Paul
- Debut: 1990
- Disbanded: 2007

The Bad Crew was an American professional wrestling tag team consisting of Jake Kemmerer (who wrestled as Bad Crew #1, Dog, or Jake) and Paul Olsek Jr. (who wrestled as Bad Crew #2, Rose, or Paul).

The Bad Crew competed in North American regional and independent promotions throughout the 1990s including Extreme Championship Wrestling, Combat Zone Wrestling, and World Xtreme Wrestling. During the late-1990s, they also ran Hardway Wrestling based in Allentown, Pennsylvania until its close in 2006.

== Professional wrestling career ==
=== Early career ===
Debuting in the American Wrestling Association during its last years, promoter Verne Gagne stated the two were "uncontrollable" during their stay in the promotion and were briefly managed by Damien Kane while in the National Wrestling Federation following the close of the AWA although Bad Crew and Kane apparently parted on bad terms.

Primarily competing on the East Coast independent promotions during the early 1990s, Bad Crew would win tag team titles in numerous promotions including becoming the first tag team champions for York-based American Commonwealth Wrestling after defeating The Drifters in a tournament final on September 30, 1993. They also won the MEWF Tag Team Championship from Quinn Nash and Adam Flash on October 5, 1995.

=== Extreme Championship Wrestling ===
In late 1995, Bad Crew made their debut in Extreme Championship Wrestling defeating The Flamingo Kid and Georgie Love at the Bodyslams Arena in Reading, Pennsylvania on November 3, 1995. Defeating George Love and Ranger Seven on November 17, Bad Crew would feud with the Dudley Brothers in late 1995 losing to Dudley Dudley and Dances with Dudley at the supercard December to Dismember on December 4 as well as matches to Dances with Dudley and Buh Buh Ray Dudley later that month. They also lost the MEWF Tag Team titles to Lucifer and Cat Burglar on December 3, 1995.

Feuding with The Headhunters during early 1996, Bad Crew fought to a no-contest against J.T. Smith and Tony Stetson at House Party on January 5. On February 2, teaming with Mr. Hughes in a 6-man tag team match, they also defeated Axl Rotten, Hack Meyers and El Puerto Ricano after Hughes pinned El Puerto Ricano in Reading, Pennsylvania and, the following month, the two would team with Judge Dredd in a 6-man tag team match defeating Dino Sendoff, Don E. Allen and the Dirt Bike Kid at CyberSlam '96 on February 17.

They would also face J. T. Smith in several tag team matches with Joel Hartgood and El Puerto Ricano, including a bout at Just Another Night, before wrestling El Puerto Ricano and Damien Stone to a no-contest at Big Ass Extreme Bash on March 9, 1996.

Continuing to feud with El Puerto Ricano and the Dudley family, Bad Crew defeated El Puerto Ricano and Chubby Dudley on March 15 although they would lose to Buh Buh Ray Dudley and Big Dick Dudley at Glenolden, Pennsylvania the following night.

Returning to Reading, the Bad Crew defeating J.T. Smith and Chad Austin on March 29 and, while defeating The Gangstas by countout, they would lose several matches to The Pitbulls and Axl Rotten and Hack Meyers during the next few weeks. After participating in a 15-man battle royal at the Lulu Temple in Plymouth Meeting, Pennsylvania on May 31, Bad Crew # 1 and Bad Crew #2 faced each other in an impromptu match with Bad Crew # 1 defeating Bad Crew #2.

Reuniting the following month, Bad Crew fought to a no-contest against their former manager Damien Kane and Devon Storm in Reading, Pennsylvania on June 8 and defeated The Dudley Brothers by disqualification at The Flagstaff in Jim Thorpe, Pennsylvania on June 14 before losing to Devon Storm and Damien Kane in a rematch at the Lulu Temple on June 21, 1996.

Defeating Havoc, Inc. (O Dog and Hollywood) on July 12, Bad Crew would lose to Ron and Don Harris at the Lulu Temple on August 2, Buh Buh Ray Dudley and Hack Meyers at the supercard Unlucky Lottery on September 13, 1996 and the following night lost to The Sandman in a handicap match with Devon Storm at the ECW Arena in Philadelphia, Pennsylvania.

In early 1997, the Bad Crew would lose to Stevie Richards and The Blue Meanie, The Gangstas, The Eliminators and later lost a handicap match to Pittbull #2 in Scranton, Pennsylvania on April 4, 1997. They would make their last appearance in the promotion losing to Axl Rotten and Balls Mahoney in Downingtown, Pennsylvania on August 22, 1997.

=== Return to the independent circuit ===
Returning to the Mid-Eastern Wrestling Federation, Bad Crew would soon recapture the tag team titles defeating "Wiseguy" Jimmy Cicero and Julio Sanchez in a championship tournament for the vacant titles on February 1, 1998. After a two-month reign as champions, Bad Crew lost the titles to Jimmy Jannetty and "Ramblin'" Rich Myers on April 17, 1998.

They recapturing the titles defeating Bob Starr and Joe Thunder on September 18, they would hold the titles for over a year before losing the belts to Max Thrasher and Dino Casanova in October 1998.

Forming "The Pack" with "Dirty Deeds" Darren Wyse and The Hungarian Barbarian, the stable would dominate several East Coast independent promotions during the late 1990s including National Championship Wrestling before the stable broke up with Bad Crew fighting Wyse and The Hungarian Barbarian for several years in one of the longest running feuds on the independent circuit.

They would also feud with The Samoans (Headshrinker Samu and L.A. Smooth) in the Xtreme Wrestling Federation eventually losing to The Samoans in a steel cage grudge match at Sportsfest '99. According to the stipulations, Bad Crew were forced to leave the promotion.

=== Combat Zone Wrestling ===
In late 1999, Bad Crew began appearing in Combat Zone Wrestling fighting to a no-contest with Mongoose and Z-Barr at CZW Pain in the Rain October 9, 1999. Although failing to defeating CZW Tag Team Champions brother Russ and Charlie Haas at CZW Xspelled on March 18, 2000, they would however defeat V.D. (Eddie Valentine and John Dahmer) at CZW Showdown in Sewell on November 10, 2001.

== Championships and accomplishments ==
- American Commonwealth Wrestling
  - ACW Tag Team Championship (1 time)
- Eastern Wrestling Federation
  - EWF Tag Team Championship (1 time)
- Hardway Wrestling
  - HW Tag Team Champions (6 times)
- Mid-Eastern Wrestling Federation
  - MEWF Tag Team Championship (3 times)
- National Championship Wrestling
  - NCW Tag Team Championship (3 times)
- Regional Championship Wrestling
  - RCW Tag Team Championship (1 time)
