= Heat Wave (1996) =

1996 Extreme Championship Wrestling supercard event

- The ECW Arena.
- Promotion: Extreme Championship Wrestling
- Date: July 13, 1996 (aired July 16, 23, and 30, 1996)
- City: Philadelphia, Pennsylvania
- Venue: ECW Arena
- Attendance: 1,500

Event chronology
← Previous; Hardcore Heaven	Next → The Doctor Is In

Heat Wave chronology
← Previous; 1995	Next → 1997

Heat Wave (1996) was the third Heat Wave professional wrestling event produced by Extreme Championship Wrestling (ECW). The event took place on July 13, 1996 from the ECW Arena in Philadelphia, Pennsylvania in the United States.

Heat Wave was streamed live as an Internet pay-per-view (iPPV) event. Excerpts from the event also aired on episodes #753, #754, and #755 of the syndicated television programme ECW Hardcore TV later that month.

== Storylines ==
The event featured wrestlers from pre-existing scripted feuds and storylines. Wrestlers portrayed villains, heroes, or less distinguishable characters in the scripted events that built tension and culminated in a wrestling match or series of matches played out on ECW's television program Hardcore TV.

At A Matter of Respect, Raven defeated The Sandman and Pitbull #2 in a three-way dance to retain the World Heavyweight Championship. At Hardcore Heaven, Raven retained the title against Terry Gordy due to interference by Stevie Richards and then a post-match brawl ensued between Raven's Nest and Gordy, Sandman and Tommy Dreamer. Later at the event, Dreamer defeated Brian Lee in a weapons match. After the match, The Bruise Brothers attacked Dreamer and Lee chokeslammed him from the Eagle's Nest onto three stacked tables in the balcony. On the June 25 episode of Hardcore TV, Richards brought back Sandman's wife Peaches to ECW and Raven had her on side due to Sandman and Peaches' issues in 1994. The following week, on July 2 episode of Hardcore TV, it was announced that Sandman, Dreamer and Gordy would take on Raven, Lee and Richards in a triple fight steel cage match, with the World Heavyweight Championship on the line and the title would change hands if Richards would be pinned. On the July 9 Hardcore TV, Raven also turned Sandman's son Tyler against him.

At A Matter of Respect, Shane Douglas defeated 2 Cold Scorpio to win the World Television Championship. Douglas was scheduled to defend the title against Scorpio at Fight the Power but Scorpio was hospitalized due to fever and then he defeated El Puerto Riqueño, Don E. Allen, Devon Storm and Mikey Whipwreck in a quick succession until he insulted Pitbull #2, who along with a bunch of wrestlers was carrying away the defeated wrestlers. Douglas also insulted Pitbull's valet Francine, who slapped Douglas and he retaliated by hitting her with a belly-to-back suplex. Pitbull then defeated Douglas in an impromptu match to win the title. At Hardcore Heaven, Pitbull #2 lost the title to Chris Jericho. On the June 25 episode of Hardcore TV, it was announced that Jericho would defend the title against former champions 2 Cold Scorpio, Shane Douglas and Pitbull #2 in a four-way dance at Heat Wave.

On the July 9 episode of Hardcore TV, Lance Wright announced during the Hype Central segment that Tarzan Goto would make his ECW debut at Heat Wave and Sabu would also wrestle at the event.

At Fight the Power, Samoan Gangstas Party (L.A. Smooth and Sammy the Silk) debuted in ECW during The Eliminators' (Kronus and Saturn) World Tag Team Championship title defense against The Gangstas (New Jack and Mustafa) by attacking Gangstas and costing them the title shot. Gangstas received a last chance at the titles against Eliminators at Hardcore Heaven, where Samoan Gangsta Party attacked them before the match even started. The Bruise Brothers then substituted for Gangstas and competed against Eliminators in the title match which ended in a no contest after Gangstas came back and attacked both teams. Later at the event, Gangstas attacked Samoan Gangsta Party during their match against Axl Rotten and Hack Meyers followed by Eliminators and Bruise Brothers coming out as well and all four teams began brawling with each other. On the July 9 episode of Hardcore TV, it was announced that Gangstas would face Samoan Gangsta Party in a match at Heat Wave.

== Event ==
=== Preliminary matches ===
The opening match was a tag team match in which The Gangstas (New Jack and Mustafa Saed) took on Samoan Gangstas Party (L.A. Smooth and Sammy the Silk). A brawl broke out between the two teams, resulting in the match ending in a no contest. After the match, Gangstas challenged Eliminators to a match for the titles with The Bruise Brothers and Samoan Gangsta Party in the match as well.

This was followed by Damien Kane, who brought out Paul Lauria to compete against Mikey Whipwreck. Whipwreck executed a Franken-Mikey to win the match. After the match, The Eliminators (John Kronus and Perry Saturn) attacked Whipwreck and Lauria and nailed a Total Elimination to Lauria and then challenged Whipwreck to bring out Sabu, who showed up and the two challenged Eliminators for the World Tag Team Championship. After knocking out Sabu through a table, Eliminators executed a Total Elimination on Whipwreck to retain the titles.

Next, The Dudley Brothers (Buh Buh Ray Dudley and Big Dick Dudley) took on The Full Blooded Italians (Little Guido and JT Smith). D-Von Dudley confronted Big Dick and provoked him to fight him, who left to fight Big Dick and Buh Buh was double teamed by FBI. Big Dick came back to the match. D-Von returned with a steel chair and hit everyone with the chair. After repeated interference by Dudleys, FBI, D-Von and Hack Meyers throughout the match, Big Dick nailed Guido with a chair shot to win the match.

Tarzan Goto made his ECW debut as he took on Axl Rotten. Goto hit a brainbuster to Rotten on a steel chair for the win. After the match, Taz cut a promo, in which he proclaimed that he choked out many shootfighters and insulted several wrestlers on the ECW roster and choked down interviewer Joey Styles until 911 made the save, who chokeslammed Joel Gertner and Bill Alfonso and then chokeslammed Taz but he recovered quickly and hit a series of Tazplexes before knocking him out with a Tazmission.

Next, Chris Jericho defended the World Television Championship against Shane Douglas, 2 Cold Scorpio and Pitbull #2 in a four-way dance. Scorpio hit a Tumbleweed on the defending champion Jericho to eliminate him. Douglas and Pitbull teamed with each other to work on Scorpio and Pitbull hit a superbomb to eliminate Scorpio. Douglas hit a belly-to-belly suplex and then Pitbulls' manager Francine showed up at ringside to seemingly distract Douglas until she kissed him and threw powder into Pitbull's eyes, thus turning on the Pitbulls. Pitbull #1 came out and drove Francine through a table with a superbomb. Near the end of the match, Pitbull #2 missed a spin kick against Douglas in the corner and Douglas hit a belly-to-belly suplex to win the title.

In the following match, El Puerto Riqueño took on Louie Spicolli. Spicolli quickly won the match by executing a Spicolli Driver and a chair shot. After the match, Sabu came out to wrestle Spicolli. After a back and forth match, Sabu delivered an Arabian Facebuster to Spicolli for the win.

=== Main event match ===
The team of The Sandman, Terry Gordy and Tommy Dreamer took on Raven's Nest members Raven, Brian Lee and Stevie Richards in a unique triple fight steel cage match for the ECW World Heavyweight Championship, which stipulated that Richards instead of defending champion Raven needed to be pinned for the title change. Sandman and Raven fought inside the cage, Dreamer and Lee brawled throughout the arena and Gordy and Richards fought at the Eagle's Nest. Sandman hit a DDT to Raven inside the cage to win the match. However, the title did not change hands as Richards had not been pinned. After the match, Lee choked out Missy Hyatt, Beulah McGillicutty and Kimona Wanalaya.

== Reception ==
Heat Wave received mixed reviews from critics with most of the critics praising the World Television Championship match. Arnold Furious of Wrestling Recaps wrote "One great match and a bunch of decent stuff. It’s a good show. If you’ve not got Path of Destruction (which has the 4-way match on it) then it’s well worth picking up for the TV title match, a decent Sabu match and some other ECW antics. Minor recommendation based on whether or not you’ve seen the TV title match."

Wrestling 20 Years Ago staff gave a rating score of 6.5 out of 10, the World Television Championship match was named match of the night and Shane Douglas was named the MVP, stating Heat Wave to be "A largely forgettable show, but with a forty-minute title match including Jericho, Douglas and Scorpio; you'd be struggling to put it down any more. There's some good early incarnations of what would soon be household names; the Francine turn shows Heyman's chops for telling a compelling story and it would be a further example of how ECW was easily the most consistent promotion in North America."

Crazy Max staff wrote "the 4-way Elimination match was just awesome, both the action and all the stuff at the end. The tag title match was also pretty decent and the main event was pretty bloody, which is what you should expect in an ECW cage match. None of the other matches were all that good. Mildly recommended show considering the 4-corner match was good and took up a good chunk of the show."

== Aftermath ==
Despite pinning Raven at Heat Wave, The Sandman did not win the World Heavyweight Championship due to the unique match stipulation. He continued his feud with Raven's Nest over the next several months. At Ultimate Jeopardy, Sandman and Tommy Dreamer defeated Stevie Richards and Brian Lee in an Ultimate Jeopardy match, which stipulated that each competitor had placed something on the line were they to be pinned. Had Brian Lee been pinned, his head would have been shaved. Had Tommy Dreamer been pinned, his valet Beulah McGillicutty would have been forced to leave ECW. Had Sandman been pinned, he would have been caned. Had Richards been pinned, he would have lost Raven's World Heavyweight Championship. Sandman pinned Richards to capture the title.

The feud between The Gangstas, Bruise Brothers, The Eliminators and Samoan Gangsta Party continued as Eliminators defended the titles against Gangstas, Bruise Brothers and Samoan Gangsta Party in a four-way dance at The Doctor Is In, where Gangstas captured the World Tag Team Championship.

Shane Douglas and The Pitbulls began a lengthy feud with Douglas and Francine following Francine's betrayal of Pitbulls at Heat Wave. The two sides fought against each other for the next nine months with the rivalry culminating at ECW's first pay-per-view event Barely Legal on April 13, 1997.

At The Doctor Is In, Chris Jericho wrestled his final ECW match, in which he lost to 2 Cold Scorpio. After the farewell match, Jericho departed ECW and jumped to World Championship Wrestling (WCW).

== Results ==
No.	Results	Stipulations	Times
1	The Gangstas (Mustafa and New Jack) vs. Samoan Gangsta Party (L.A. Smooth and Sammy the Silk) ended in a no contest	Tag team match	2:55
2	Mikey Whipwreck defeated Paul Lauria	Singles match	1:32
3	The Eliminators (Kronus and Saturn) (c) defeated Sabu and Mikey Whipwreck	Tag team match for the ECW World Tag Team Championship	12:02
4	The Dudley Brothers (Buh Buh Ray Dudley and Big Dick Dudley) (with Chubby Dudley, Dances with Dudley and Sign Guy Dudley) defeated the Full Blooded Italians (Little Guido and J.T. Smith) (with Salvatore Bellomo and Big Guido)	Tag team match	6:38
5	Tarzan Goto defeated Axl Rotten	Singles match	7:02
6	Shane Douglas defeated Chris Jericho (c), 2 Cold Scorpio and Pitbull #2	Four-way dance for the ECW World Television Championship	40:47
7	Louie Spicolli defeated El Puerto Riqueño	Singles match	1:10
8	Sabu defeated Louie Spicolli	Singles match	11:36
9	The Sandman, Terry Gordy and Tommy Dreamer defeated Raven (c), Brian Lee and Stevie Richards (with Lori and Tyler Fullington)	Steel cage match for the ECW World Heavyweight Championship	16:42
(c) / – the champion(s) heading into the match

=== Four-Way Dance eliminations ===
Elimination no.	Wrestler	Eliminated by	Elimination move	Time
1	Chris Jericho	2 Cold Scorpio	Pinfall	27:00
2	2 Cold Scorpio	Pitbull #2	Pinfall	31:00
3	Pitbull #2	Shane Douglas	Pinfall	40:47
Winner:	Shane Douglas			

== See also ==
- 1996 in professional wrestling
