= Psycho Sam =

Psycho Sam may refer to:

- Mark Vartanian, Sammy Couch, also known as 'Psycho' Sam Cody
- Richard McCroskey, also known as Syko Sam, convicted of the 2009 Farmville murders
