= Harry Boatswain =

American football player (1969–2005)

No. 65, 69, 79
- Positions: Guard, tackle

Personal information
- Born: June 26, 1969; Brooklyn, New York, U.S.
- Died: August 8, 2005 (aged 36); New York, New York, U.S.
- Listed height: 6 ft 4 in (1.93 m)
- Listed weight: 310 lb (141 kg)

Career information
- High school: James Madison (Brooklyn)
- College: New Haven
- NFL draft: 1991: 5th round, 137th overall pick
- Expansion draft: 1995: 2nd round, 4th overall pick

Career history
- San Francisco 49ers (1991–1994); Carolina Panthers (1995)*; Philadelphia Eagles (1995); New York Jets (1996); Philadelphia Eagles (1997)*; Memphis Maniax (2001)
- * Offseason or practice squad member only

Awards and highlights
- Super Bowl champion (XXIX)

Career NFL statistics
- Games played: 74
- Games started: 19
- Fumble recoveries: 2
- Stats at Pro Football Reference

Harry Kwane Boatswain (June 26, 1969 – August 8, 2005) was an American professional football player who played offensive tackle for five seasons for the San Francisco 49ers, Philadelphia Eagles, and New York Jets. He was selected by the 49ers in the fifth round of the 1991 NFL draft. Boatswain graduated from the University of New Haven with degrees in both marketing and business administration. He accompanied former football player Brian Pillman at the professional wrestling event, Big Ass Extreme Bash, in 1996. He died in 2005.
