= Psycho Sam Cody =

American professional wrestler

Personal information
- Born: Sammy Couch; May 16, 1955 (age 71) Lansing, Kansas, U.S.
- Family: Samantha Couch (Daughter) Sophia Philpot (Granddaughter)

Professional wrestling career
- Ring names: Ivan Zatkoff; Psycho Sam; Psycho Sam Cody; Sam Cody; Sam Couch; Sam Dudley
- Billed height: 5 ft 9 in (175 cm)
- Billed weight: 242 lb (110 kg)
- Trained by: Crusher Verdu
- Debut: 1980
- Retired: 2005

Sammy Couch is an American retired professional wrestler, better known by the ring name Psycho Sam Cody.

== Professional wrestling career ==
Couch was trained by Crusher Verdu, debuting in 1980.

Cody mostly wrestled on the independent level, making his career in the Midwest Championship Wrestling (MCW) circuit under the guidance of fellow wrestler and promoter "Big" Jim Lancaster. Cody stayed with the company until the promotion dissolved in 1992. In March and June 2004, the company resurfaced, holding shows in St. Marys, Ohio and Botkins, Ohio. Cody participated in both shows and was also inducted into the Midwest Hall of Fame.

Cody appeared with the World Wrestling Federation (WWF) in March 1987, facing Kamala in a bout that aired on episode #31 of WWF Wrestling Challenge the following month. The match saw Kamala defeat Cody and inflict kayfabe injuries that required Cody to be carried from the ring on a stretcher.

Cody made his first appearance with World Championship Wrestling (WCW) in May 1990, teaming with Ned Brady in a loss to the Southern Boys on an episode of NWA World Wide Wrestling. He returned to the promotion for a series of matches from May to August 1991, including a loss to Sting on an episode of World Championship Wrestling and teaming with Snake Watson in a loss to the WCW Patriots (Firebreaker Chip and Todd Champion) on an episode of WCW WorldWide. He made his final appearance with WCW in March 1993, losing to Ron Simmons on an episode of WCW Saturday Night.

In 2001, Cody (as Psycho Sam Dudley, one of the Dudley Brothers) teamed with Big Dick Dudley to win the USA Pro Wrestling Tag Team Championship.

When he joined the Cincinnati, Ohio promotion Northern Wrestling Federation (NWF), Cody started to gain fame on the independent level, even being ranked as one of the top 500 wrestlers in the world in 1992. His most successful gimmick was as half of the 'Kansas City Outlaws' tag team partnership with "Rough House" Roger Ruffen, a team that was originally started in the MCW territory. Ruffen later interfered in a hair vs. mask match between Cody and Patriot, helping Cody to get the win. Cody quickly became known as the "Hardcore Legend of The NWF," as he competed in many steel cage matches, as well as TLC matches. Not only was Cody one of the premiere stars of the NWF. Cody's last big match occurred in Fairfield, Ohio against NWF talent Dustin Lillard. The match was under 'garbage can' rules, where garbage cans were at the wrestlers disposal to use as weapons throughout the match. Cody, after breaking his wrist during the match, managed to achieve victory over Lillard via pinfall. Cody was forced into retirement following a doctor's exam, when he failed an MRI test, with doctors suggesting that many years of head shots had finally taken their toll. Shortly thereafter, Cody was inducted into the NWF Hall of Fame.

== Championships and accomplishments ==
- Midwest Championship Wrestling
  - MCW Hall of Fame (Class of 2004)
- USA Pro Wrestling
  - USA Pro Wrestling Tag Team Championship (1 time) - with Big Dick Dudley
