= Dudley Dudley (wrestler) =

American professional wrestler

Personal information
- Born: Jeffery Bradley; 1973 (age 52–53) San Antonio, Texas, U.S.

Professional wrestling career
- Ring name(s): Bad Boy Bradley; Bruiser Bradley; Bruiser Kong; Charlie Hunter; Dudley Dudley; Evil Snack; Jeff Bradley; Original Dudley Dudley; The Texas Strangler
- Billed height: 6 ft 4 in (1.93 m)
- Billed weight: 295 lb (134 kg)
- Billed from: "Dudleyville" "The hills of Charleston, Pennsylvania" (ECW)
- Trained by: Boris Malenko; Dean Malenko; Hiro Matsuda
- Debut: 1993
- Retired: 2013

Jeffrey Bradley (born 1973) is an American professional wrestler. He is best known for his appearances with Extreme Championship Wrestling in 1995 as a member of the Dudley Brothers under the ring name Dudley Dudley.

== Early life ==
Bradley was born in San Antonio, Texas and raised in Brandon, Florida. As a child, he attended wrestling shows at the Fort Homer Hesterly Armory along with his family, and thus developed an interest in wrestling.

== Professional wrestling career ==
=== Training and early career ===
Bradley trained as a professional wrestler under Joe Malenko and his brother Dean. Bradley was also one of the last wrestlers to receive training from Hiro Matsuda, who was visiting the Malenko's school in order to train Osamu Nishimura when Bradley began training. His first match took place in Tampa, Florida and saw Bradley wrestle Gary Nice.

=== World Wrestling Federation (1993–1995) ===
Following a 1993 tour of Australia as part of Dean Malenko's Wrestle Riot group, Bradley, upon his return to America, was brought into the World Wrestling Federation by Jimmy Del Ray. Bradley was given the ring name "Charlie Hunter", and worked for the WWF for two years, in the course of which he wrestled both The British Bulldog and Shawn Michaels and appeared on Monday Night Raw.

=== Extreme Championship Wrestling (1995–1996) ===
Renamed "Dudley Dudley", Bradley arrived in ECW on July 1, 1995. He was billed as being part of the Dudley family along with his storyline half-brothers Snot Dudley and Big Dick Dudley. Dudley Dudley was known for his deep voice and strange laugh during interviews, and had the distinction of being "the only pure Dudley" - while all the Dudleys allegedly had (the apocryphal) Big Daddy Dudley as a common father, Dudley Dudley was the only Dudley who had (the equally fictitious) Momma Dudley as a mother. As a result, Dudley Dudley was the unquestioned leader of the stable.

The Dudley Boys feuded with The Pitbulls, and were members of Raven's Nest. In late 1995, the Dudleys were joined by Dances with Dudley and Buh Buh Ray Dudley. Dudley Dudley teamed with Dances With Dudley after his former partner, Snot, was badly injured in a jet ski accident. He left ECW in early 1996 after deciding to take a hiatus from wrestling.

=== World Championship Wrestling (1995, 1997) ===
In October 1997 Bradley appeared with WCW as a jobber. He had previously appeared with WCW as a jobber in 1995, wrestling Brian Pillman at a house show.

=== World tour ===
Bradley worked in Japan for Big Japan Pro Wrestling and the International Wrestling Association of Japan, competing in a variety of deathmatches, and toured the world, appearing in Africa and South America. In late 2004 Bradley toured Austria and Hungary with Chris Raaber's European Wrestling Association. Bradley also toured Puerto Rico on several occasions as part of the International Wrestling Association, wrestling as "Bad Boy Bradley". He also was a member of Carlos Colons company (WWC) P.R.

=== Florida ===
Bradley returned to Florida and began wrestling on the independent circuit as "The original Dudley Dudley", and for IPW Hardcore as "Evil Snack", an evil chef with his proteges Von Tankard and Kubiak, who were known as The Snack Pack. He later began wrestling for NWA Florida, but was sidelined with a serious biceps injury in January 2004.

Bradley trained numerous wrestlers at Dean Malenko's School of professional wrestling in Tampa while Malenko was touring Japan, including Axis, Chad Collyer, Molly Holly, Jet Jaguar, Kane, Jeremy Lopez, Tony Mamaluke, Mike and Todd Shane, Rod Steel, Bruce Steele, and Mikey Tenderfoot. On December 1, 2004, Bradley became a trainer at Steve Keirn's School of Hard Knocks, also located in Tampa.

=== Puerto Rico (2008) ===
Bradley returned to Puerto Rico and began wrestling in World Wrestling Council as Bad Boy Bradley. He made tag with Todd Dean and defeat Juventud Boricua (Chris Joel and Noriega) to win the WWC Tag Team Championship.

Kong made his debut for Birkenhead based All Star Wrestling, worked all over the U.K. and Wales along with Ireland and Scotland. A standout performer Bradley has also worked for Austrian wrestling promotion EWA on several occasions and held the EWA heavy weight belt in 2009 by defeating WWE developmental talent and champion Chris "bambikiller" Rabber in Leoben, Austria. Bradley was also noted for working WWF talent "Just Joe" Joe E. Legend drawing another sold-out house for EWA. Bruiser Bradley also competed in a weekend-long catch-as-catch-can Far East Wrestling tournament in Kuwait City and by far was a top fan favorite. Bradley also appeared live on Kuwait's most popular television sports talk show.

Bradley ended 2009 by once again returning to Carlos Colon's World Wrestling Council (WWC) in Puerto Rico.

== Championships and accomplishments ==
- BJW
  - BJW Heavyweight Championship (1 time)
- Independent Professional Wrestling
  - IPW Hardcore Championship (1 time)
  - IPW Television Champion (1 time)
- International Wrestling Association
  - IWA Hardcore Championship (1 time)
  - IWA World Tag Team Championship (1 time) - with Mr. Big
- World Wrestling Council
  - WWC World Television Championship (1 time)
  - WWC World Tag Team Championship (1 time) - with Todd Dean
