= Dances with Dudley =

American professional wrestler

Personal information
- Born: Adolfo Bermudez Oklahoma, US

Professional wrestling career
- Ring name(s): Chief Dudley; Dances with Dudley; White Wolf; White Cloud; D.W. Dudley; La Raza Adolfo
- Billed height: 5 ft 11 in (1.80 m)
- Billed weight: 290 lb (130 kg)
- Debut: 1992
- Retired: 2004

Adolfo Bermudez is an American professional wrestler. He is best known for his appearances with Extreme Championship Wrestling in 1995 to 1996 as a member of the Dudley family under the ring name Dances with Dudley (sometimes abbreviated to D.W. Dudley).

== Professional wrestling career ==
=== Early career (1992–1995) ===
Bermudez made his professional wrestling debut in 1992 with Angelo Savoldi's Pennsylvania-based International World Class Championship Wrestling promotion. Wrestling as "White Cloud", Bermudez formed a tag team with Dancing Wolf (Al Farat) dubbed The Sioux War Party. In May 1992, The Sioux War Party won a tournament for the vacant IWCCW Tag Team Championship. The duo held the titles for over a year, finally losing to Jimmy Deo and L.A. Gore in June 1993, only to regain the championship that same day. In 1994, The Sioux War Party vacated the titles upon leaving the IWCCW.

After a brief stay in the AWF, he and White Wolf won the AWF tag team titles before Burmudez was brought into Extreme Championship Wrestling to replace Snot Dudley who had been injured at ECW Hardcore Heaven earlier that year.

=== Extreme Championship Wrestling (1995–1996) ===
Bermudez debuted in the Philadelphia, Pennsylvania-based promotion Extreme Championship Wrestling on the September 17, 1995 episode of ECW Hardcore TV. Wearing overalls, a tie-dyed shirt and high-tops, Bermudez wrestled as "Dances with Dudley", parodied from the movie Dances with Wolves, a member of the Dudley family stable. Dances with Dudley was said to be the child of Big Daddy Dudley - the patriarch of the Dudley family - and a Native American woman from Cheyenne, Oklahoma.

Dances with Dudley formed a tag team with his kayfabe half-brother, Dudley Dudley, replacing the injured Snot Dudley. Dances with Dudley and Dudley Dudley lost to the Steiner Brothers and The Public Enemy during August although they later defeated Chad Austin and Don E. Allen at Gangstas Paradise on September 16, 1995, and later faced J.T. Smith and Hack Meyers in singles matches.

After losing to ECW World Tag Team Champions The Pit Bulls on September 23 and The Gangstas on October 6, Dudley Dudley left to pursue a singles career and was replaced by Buh Buh Ray Dudley. They, however, lost to The Pit Bulls, Public Enemy and The Eliminators during November and early December. Reuniting with Dudley Dudley at December to Dismember to defeat The Bad Crew on December 9, he and Buh Buh Ray Dudley also defeated Bad Crew on December 28 although they lost to them in a rematch two days later that month.

In early-1996, Bermudez suffered a leg injury during an ECW event. At Massacre on Queens Boulevard in April 1996, he was wheeled to ringside for the Dudley Brothers' match, during which D-Von Dudley made his debut, expressing disgust at the comedic antics of the other Dudleys. At Fight the Power in June 1996, and again at Heat Wave in July 1996, D-Von Dudley attacked the other Dudleys, giving them chair shots. Following the attacks by D-Von Dudley, Bermudez and the other members of the Dudleys feuded with the renegade D-Von Dudley. He and Chubby Dudley soon left the promotion however, allegedly in a dispute with promoter Paul Heyman.

=== Big Japan Pro Wrestling (1996) ===
In 1996, Dances with Dudley toured Japan with the Big Japan Pro Wrestling promotion. He teamed with other Americans such as Bull Pain and Ian Rotten and faced wrestlers such as Yoshiaki Yatsu and Sabu.

=== Independent circuit (1996–2004) ===
From 1997 to 1999, he wrestled with several tag partners as Laraza as featured in Pro Wrestling Illustrated. He had several matches with such workers as Spanish Angel, Kid USA, Lucifer, Homicide and Low Life Louie. He had great feedback from promoter Bobby Lombardi but left when the Long Island Wrestling Federation did shows further east on Long Island.

In the mid-2000s, Dances with Dudley adopted the ring name "Chief Dudley".

== Championships and accomplishments ==
- Americas Wrestling Federation
  - AWF World Tag Team Championship (1 time) - with Running Wolf
- International World Class Championship Wrestling
  - IWCCW Tag Team Championship (2 times) - with Dancing Wolf
- East Coast Professional Wrestling
  - ECPW Tag Team Championship (1 time) - with Jimmy Thunder
- Pro Wrestling Illustrated
  - PWI ranked him #217 of the top 500 singles wrestlers in the PWI 500 in 1996
