= Chubby Dudley =

American professional wrestler

Personal information
- Born: Bay Ragni; April 25, 1970 (age 56) Upper Darby Township, Pennsylvania, U.S.

Professional wrestling career
- Ring name(s): Bay Ragni; Chubby Dudley; E.Z. Ryder; Hell Rider
- Billed height: 5 ft 10 in (1.78 m)
- Billed weight: 282 lb (128 kg)
- Billed from: "Dudleyville"
- Trained by: Larry Winters
- Debut: 1991
- Retired: 2003

Bay Ragni (born April 25, 1970) is an American retired professional wrestler and promoter. He is best known for his appearances with Extreme Championship Wrestling from 1995 to 1996 under the ring name Chubby Dudley, one of the Dudley Brothers.

== Professional wrestling career ==
=== Early career (1991–1992) ===
Ragni was trained to wrestle by Larry Winters. He debuted on the independent circuit in 1991.

=== Eastern Championship Wrestling (1992–1993) ===
In late 1992, Ragni joined the Philadelphia, Pennsylvania-based promotion Eastern Championship Wrestling, where he adopted the ring name "E.Z. Ryder" and formed a tag team known as "The Hell Riders" with H.D. Ryder. On the inaugural episode of ECW Hardcore TV (airing April 3, 1993 on SportsChannel Philadelphia), The Hell Riders unsuccessfully challenged The Super Destroyers for the ECW Tag Team Championship. Ragni left ECW in late 1993.

=== Independent circuit (1993–1995) ===
After leaving ECW, Ragni briefly toured the Mid-Atlantic states before joining the Newark, Delaware-based East Coast Wrestling Association, where he wrestled as "Hell Rider".

=== Extreme Championship Wrestling (1995–1996) ===
In mid-1995, Ragni returned to Eastern Championship Wrestling, which had been renamed Extreme Championship Wrestling in 1994. He was given the gimmick of "Chubby Dudley", an obese, slobbish member of the Dudley family. Ragni rarely wrestled, but would accompany his storyline half-brothers to ringside, normally while holding a cake, Crunchberries or other snack. If the other members of the Dudley family were incapacitated, Ragni would flee from ringside.

At "Massacre on Queens Boulevard" on April 13, 1996, D-Von Dudley made his debut, angrily proclaiming that the Dudley's comedic antics were not the way "true Dudleys" should conduct themselves. At Heat Wave on July 13, 1996, D-Von attacked Dances with Dudley, Chubby Dudley and Sign Guy Dudley with a chair and delivered a low blow to Buh Buh Ray before being driven off by Hack Meyers.

Ragni left ECW again in mid-1996.

=== Liberty All-Star Wrestling (1994–2002) ===
Ragni began promoting in 1994, opening Liberty All-Star Wrestling (LAW) along with "Lucky" Larry Reed and Frank "Super Cody" Cody. LAW was based in Chester Heights, with a training academy, Liberty All-Star Wrestling Academy, in Lansdowne. Ragni acted as the commissioner of the promotion, occasionally refereed, and wrestled matches. The promotion closed in May 2002.

=== Later career (1996-2003) ===
After ECW, Ragani continued to work in the independents in New Jersey and Pennsylvania. He retired in 2003.

=== Other Media ===
In 2022 Ragni started a YouTube channel called React & Chill with Chubby Dudley. The channel features Ragni reacting to full ECW episodes and interviews with other fellow ECW alumni. The channel currently has over 600 subscribers.
