= Dudley Brothers =

Professional wrestling stable

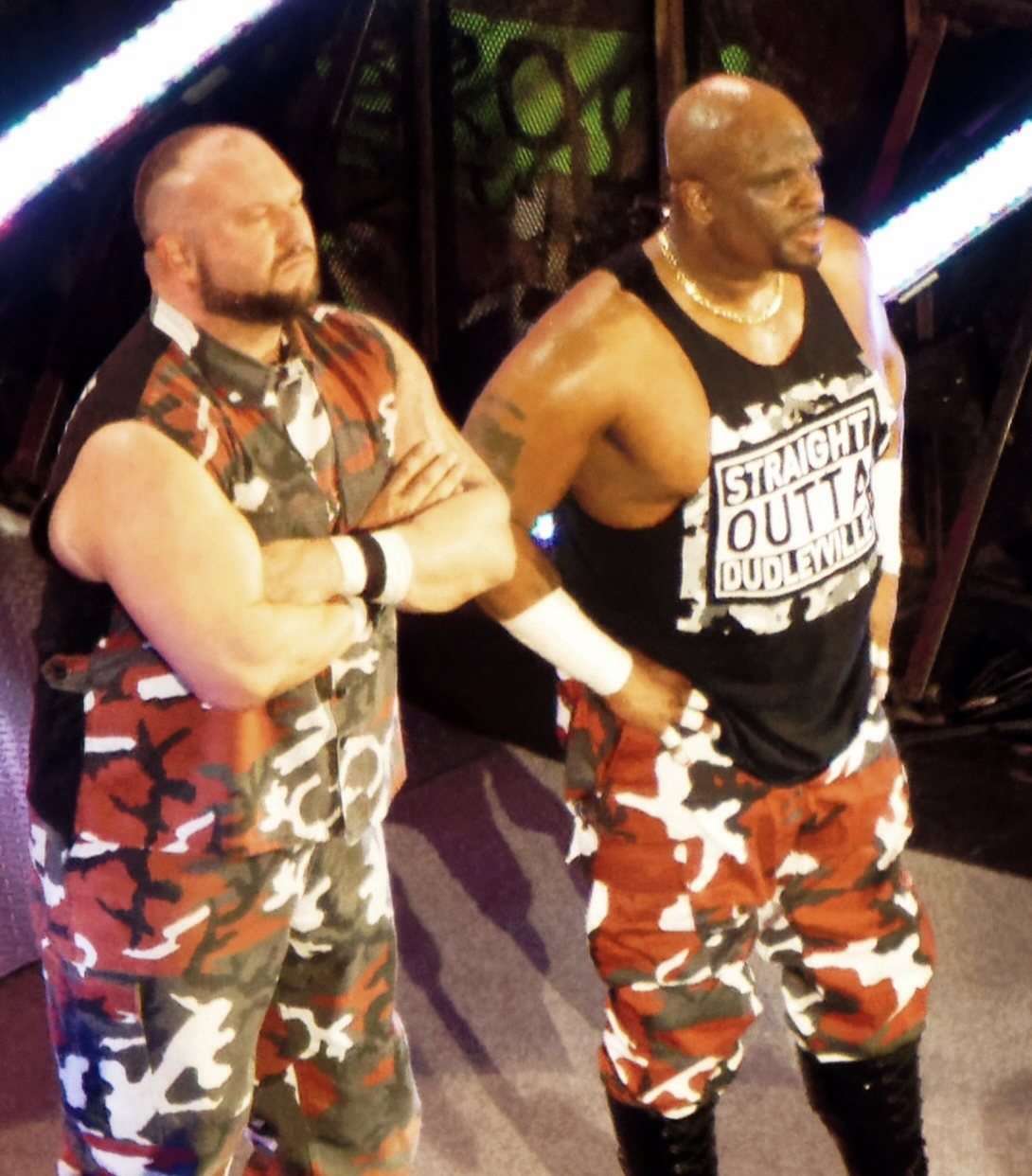
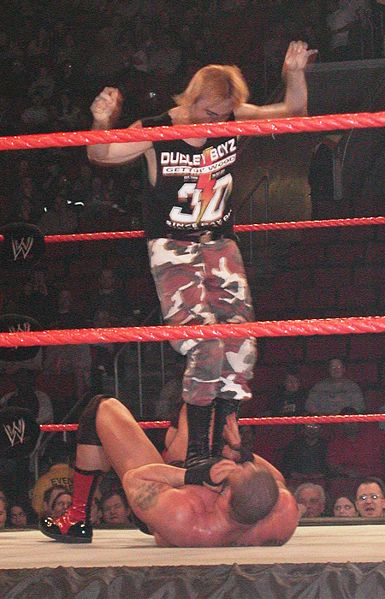
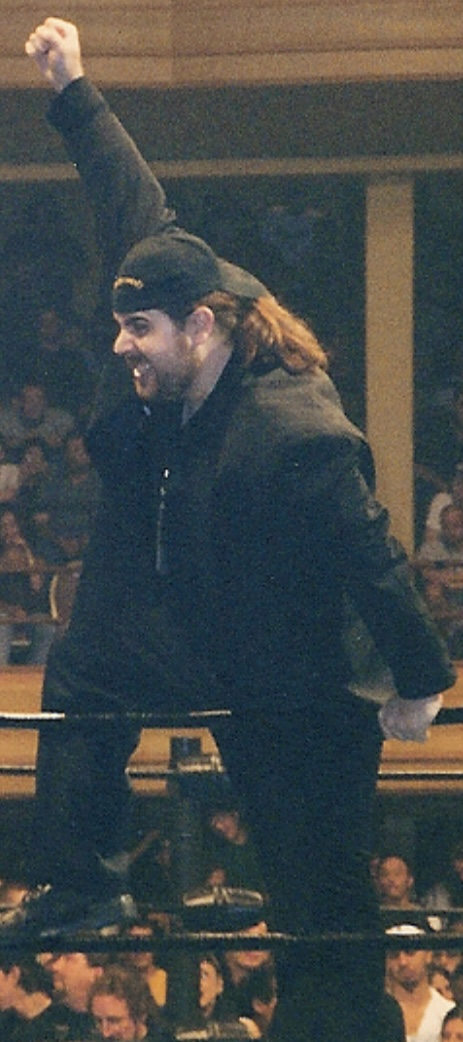
- Buh Buh Ray Dudley and D-Von Dudley Little Spike Dudley Sign Guy Dudley

Stable
- Members: See below
- Name(s): The Dudley Boyz; The Dudley Brothers; The Dudley Clan; The Dudley Family; The Dudleys
- Billed from: "Dudleyville" "The hills of Charleston, Pennsylvania"
- Debut: July 1, 1995
- Disbanded: August 26, 1999
- Years active: 1995–1999

The Dudley Brothers were a professional wrestling stable active in Extreme Championship Wrestling between 1995 and 1999.

The gimmick of the group was that, despite their obvious differences in physical appearance and race, the members were all said to be the sons of the fictional Willy Loman-esque "Big Daddy" Dudley, who had traveled America as a salesman throughout the 1960s and 1970s. Despite the differences in their races and sizes, the Dudleys shared a similar ring attire of taped glasses, unkempt hair, tie-dye shirts, high-tops and overalls. The gimmick was based on the Hanson Brothers from the 1977 movie Slap Shot.

== History ==
=== Extreme Championship Wrestling (1995–1999) ===
==== Origins (1995–1996) ====
I told this boy that I'm the one that's supposed to do all the interviews now, beings that I'm the only legitimate Dudley. Because, the reason why is, both my parents had the same last name...Dudley. Everybody knows why Big Dick got here...it seems Big Daddy Dudley had a little liaison with the Holland Tunnel, and well, this speaks for itself. For that little thing he did, Daddy had to spend a little time in an insane asylum, and well that kinda popped-out Sign Guy Dudley. Y'know, I had told y'all before about the Indian guy, D.W. Dudley. Daddy went over to Oklahoma to the Cheyenne reservation, and well, everybody knows this guy.

— Dudley Dudley, October 1995

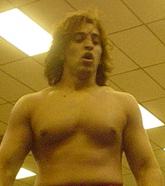
Snot Dudley, one of the original three Dudley Brothers

The original three members of the Dudley family were Dudley Dudley (the only one of the brothers with a Dudley for a mother), Big Dick Dudley (the menacing, animalistic enforcer of the group) and Snot Dudley (the underdog of the group, who would pick his nose during matches). They made their first appearance on July 1, 1995, at Hardcore Heaven, where the tag team of Dudley Dudley and Snot Dudley defeated the Pitbulls. Shortly after their debut, the Dudley Brothers aligned themselves with Raven, joining Raven's Nest. At Heatwave '95: Rage in the Cage! on July 15, 1995, Dudley Dudley and Snot Dudley teamed with Raven in a loss to Tommy Dreamer and the Pitbulls.

After Snot Dudley was injured in a legitimate jet ski accident, he was replaced on the September 17, 1995 episode of ECW Hardcore TV by Dances with Dudley, who was said to be the child of Big Daddy Dudley and a Cheyenne woman. Dudley Dudley and Dances with Dudley teamed with one another through the latter half of 1995, competing against teams such as the Gangstas and the Bad Crew. In September 1995, Dudley Dudley and Dances with Dudley unsuccessfully challenged the Pitbulls for the ECW World Tag Team Championship.

The group was later expanded when the obese, slobbish Chubby Dudley and the mute, placard-wielding Sign Guy Dudley (the result of Big Daddy Dudley's brief incarceration in an asylum) began accompanying Dudley Dudley and Dances with Dudley to ringside.

In October 1995, the Dudley family was joined by Buh Buh Ray Dudley, a stuttering, dancing, overweight hillbilly. After Dudley Dudley left ECW in late 1995, Buh Buh Ray Dudley began teaming with Dances with Dudley, facing tag teams such as the Public Enemy and the Eliminators. At Holiday Hell on December 29, 1995, the Dudley Brothers left Raven's Nest, turning the group face as a result. In January 1996, Dances with Dudley and Buh Buh Ray Dudley unsuccessfully challenged Cactus Jack and Mikey Whipwreck for the ECW World Tag Team Championship.

==== World Tag Team Champions (1996-1999) ====
"Thou shalt not steal!" "Thou shalt not kill!" And thou shalt not fuck with the Dudleys!

— D-Von Dudley, April 1996

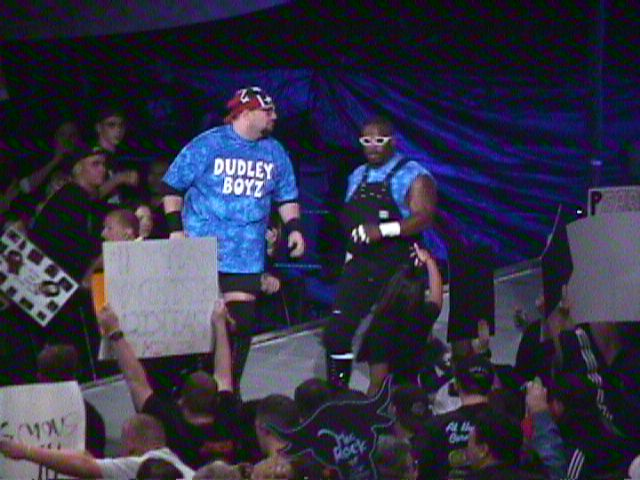
Buh Buh Ray Dudley and D-Von Dudley in 1999, wearing the Dudley Brothers' signature tie-dye shirts, overalls and glasses

At Massacre on Queens Boulevard on April 13, 1996, D-Von Dudley officially made his debut, angrily proclaiming that the Dudley's comedic antics were not the way "true Dudleys" should conduct themselves. At Heatwave on July 13, 1996, D-Von attacked Dances with Dudley, Chubby Dudley and Sign Guy Dudley with a chair and delivered a low blow to Buh Buh Ray before being driven off by Hack Meyers.

Dances With Dudley and Chubby Dudley left ECW in mid-1996. Later that September at When Worlds Collide II, Little Spike Dudley debuted in ECW. The "runt" of the Dudley Brothers, Spike began teaming with Buh Buh Ray Dudley, facing tag teams such as the Eliminators and the Bad Crew. The duo also faced D-Von Dudley in a number of bouts. At November to Remember on November 16, 1996, Buh Buh Ray defeated D-Von in a singles match.

At Crossing the Line Again on February 1, 1997, Buh Buh Ray turned heel by joining forces with D-Von. The duo began teaming together as the Dudley Boyz, along with Big Dick Dudley and Sign Guy Dudley, forming a dominant heel stable. Between March 1997 and August 1999, Buh Buh Ray and D-Von held the ECW World Tag Team Championship on a record eight occasions. The Dudleys feuded with rivals such as the Eliminators, New Jack, Tommy Dreamer and the Sandman, Balls Mahoney, and Little Spike Dudley, the sole remaining face Dudley.

On the April 11, 1998 episode of ECW Hardcore TV, The Bushwhackers made an appearance as the "Bush-Dudleys". Cousins Luke Dudley and Butch Dudley who were supposed to fight The Sandman and Tommy Dreamer only to be ambushed by Buh Buh Ray and D-Von.

At It Ain't Seinfeld on May 14, 1998, Buh Buh Ray Dudley's taunting resulted in a member of the audience attempted to rush the ring before being intercepted by security guards. On the June 3, 1998 episode of ECW Hardcore TV, Buh Buh Ray and D-Von delivered their Dudley Death Drop finishing maneuver to Beulah McGillicutty, supposedly breaking her neck.

Big Dick left ECW in early 1999. The stable finally dissolved in August 1999 at the Last Show at the Madhouse, where Buh Buh Ray and D-Von left ECW to join the World Wrestling Federation as The Dudley Boyz. In October 1999 at Re-enter the Sandman, Sign Guy Dudley renamed himself "Lou E. Dangerously", leaving Spike as the sole remaining Dudley in ECW until the promotion folded in April 2001, when he too joined the WWF, reuniting with Buh Buh Ray and D-Von.

== Legacy ==
Buh Buh Ray (renamed "Bubba Ray") and D-Von Dudley would go on to the World Wrestling Federation, winning the World Tag Team Championship eight times, as well as the WWE Tag Team Championship and WCW Tag Team Championship once each. Spike Dudley joined his "half-brothers" in 2001, winning the WWE European Championship and WWE Cruiserweight Championship, and remained with the Dudleys on and off until their collective release in 2005. For a short time, Stacy Keibler acted as a valet for the Dudleys under the name of "The Duchess of Dudleyville". The Backseat Boyz, Trent Acid and Johnny Kashmere, appeared on an episode of WWF Sunday Night Heat as "The Backseat Dudleys." In early 2007, actor Steve Schirripa appeared alongside Bubba Ray (renamed "Brother Ray") and D-Von (renamed "Brother Devon") in Total Nonstop Action Wrestling, where he was presented as a distant relative of the Dudley family.

Several more Dudleys were created outside of ECW. Big Dick Dudley formed a tag team on the independent circuit with Sammy Couch, using the name "Psycho Sam Dudley", while Snot Dudley formed a tag team with Jeff Roth, using the name "Schmuck Dudley". Beginning in 2015, D-Von Dudley's sons began wrestling as Terrell Dudley and Terrence Dudley.

== Trademark of name ==
After the release of Bubba Ray and D-Von from WWE in 2005, they were informed by the company that they could not use any aspect of the "Dudley" name in any other promotions due to WWE trademarking the names before their release. This decision was controversial due to the fact that Paul Heyman, the former owner of ECW, had "given" the men (including Spike) the rights to the gimmick out of loyalty when ECW folded, but never actually transferred the rights in any official manner.

Although the former Dudleys attempted to fight WWE for ownership, they were unsuccessful. Following their debut in Total Nonstop Action Wrestling (TNA), they took the monikers of "Brother Ray " (Bubba Ray) and "Brother Devon" (D-Von), combining under the new name "Team 3D". As a jab back at WWE, they wore shirts with middle fingers on them with the message "Trademark This!" and constantly tread a fine line of the official trademark by either having others use their common phrase "Get the tables!" or almost saying it before stopping short right before. Originally, however, the two were going to adopt the last name of Deadly. During an interview with Steve Austin on the Broken Skull Podcast, Bubba Ray stated the name got leaked to the media prior to their debut in TNA and he decided, out of stubbornness, to not use the name Deadly. When Spike was released from WWE shortly thereafter, he was forced to work under the name Matt "LSD" Hyson in various independent promotions. Upon joining his brothers in TNA in 2006, he was re-christened as "Brother Runt".

Many people have laid claim to the intellectual property that is the Dudley Boy gimmick. Former ECW wrestler Raven has said multiple times that he is the person who came up with the original Dudley idea. Taz has corroborated his story, but added that it was not just Raven who came up with the idea, but Raven and Taz together.

== Members ==
=== Dudley brothers ===
- Big Dick Dudley (1995–1999)
- Buh Buh Ray Dudley (1995–1999)
- Chubby Dudley (1995–1996)
- Dances with Dudley (1995–1996)
- Dudley Dudley (1995)
- D-Von Dudley (1996–1999)
- Sign Guy Dudley (1995–1999)
- Little Spike Dudley (1996–1999)
- Snot Dudley (1995)

=== Dudleys outside of ECW ===
- The Backseat Boyz ("The Backseat Dudleys") (World Wrestling Federation, April 15, 2001)
- Psycho Sam Dudley (USA Pro Wrestling, 2001–2002)
- Schmuck Dudley (Florida Championship Wrestling, 1998–1999)
- Stacy Keibler ("The Duchess of Dudleyville") (World Wrestling Federation, 2001–2002)
- Steve Schirripa ("Cousin Steve") (Total Nonstop Action Wrestling, February 2007)
- Big Vern Dudley (American Pro Wrestling, 2002)
- Urkel Dudley and Dog Puke Dudley (Coastal Championship Wrestling, 2013)
- Terrell Dudley and Terrence Dudley (independent circuit/All Elite Wrestling, 2015–present)

== Championships ==
- Extreme Championship Wrestling
  - ECW World Tag Team Championship (10 times) – Buh Buh Ray Dudley and D-Von Dudley (8) and Little Spike Dudley and Balls Mahoney (2)

== See also ==
- Dudley Boyz
- TNT
