= Pablo Márquez (wrestler) =

Ecuadorian professional wrestler

Personal information
- Born: June 4, 1973 (age 53) Quito, Ecuador

Professional wrestling career
- Ring name(s): Abu; Babu; PABLO; Pablo Márquez; El Puerto Riqueño; Ubas
- Billed height: 1.73 m (5 ft 8 in)
- Billed weight: 83 kg (183 lb)
- Billed from: Ecuador
- Trained by: Larry Sharpe, Sabu
- Debut: 1992

Pablo Márquez (born June 4, 1973) is an Ecuadorian professional wrestler. He is perhaps best known for his appearances in the United States throughout the 1990s, including stints with Extreme Championship Wrestling under his birth name and under the ring names El Puerto Riqueño and Ubas and with the World Wrestling Federation as Babu.

== Professional wrestling career ==
=== Early career (1992–1995) ===
Márquez was trained to wrestle in the United States by Larry Sharpe. He made his debut on the independent circuit in 1992.

=== Extreme Championship Wrestling (1995–1999) ===
Márquez debuted in Extreme Championship Wrestling (ECW) at South Philly Jam in October 1995, wrestling under the ring name of "El Puerto Riqueño" (some sources list him as "El Puerto Ricano"). He challenged for the ECW Television Championship on several occasions, but he was not able to win the belt. He appeared at several major shows; his first major appearance was a loss to Stevie Richards at November to Remember 1995. The following month, he competed at December to Dismember 1995, losing to Taz, and Holiday Hell 1995, where he lost to Bruiser Mastino. He wrestled at three major ECW shows in 1996, losing to Spiro Greco at CyberSlam 1996, wrestling to a no contest against Super Nova at Hostile City Showdown 1996, and losing to Louie Spicolli at Heat Wave 1996. In 1997, he started to wrestle under his real name. Also during his ECW run, he competed under the name Ubas (Sabu spelled backwards). During his run, he appeared on ECW Hardcore TV, and also appeared on some of ECW's feature shows. He left ECW when he was signed by WWF.

=== World Wrestling Federation (1997, 1998–1999) ===
Márquez was briefly part of the WWF's fledgeling Light Heavyweight division, wrestling two matches against Taka Michinoku in late 1997 and early 1998.

He re-debuted on the August 16, 1998 episode of Sunday Night Heat under the name of Abu (later Babu). His gimmick was that of a manservant to Tiger Ali Singh. He was often seen doing degrading things for Singh and would pay random people in the audience each week to perform humiliating stunts. Although most of his stint in WWF was in a non-wrestling role, he did have a few televised matches: on the November 9, 1998 edition of Monday Night Raw, he was ordered by Tiger Ali Singh to wrestle Al Snow, though Singh reentered and won the match; on the December 6, 1998 edition of Sunday Night Heat, he teamed with Singh to wrestle Kurrgan and Luna Vachon, with the match ending in a no-contest. He also wrestled on a 1998 edition of Shotgun when he was ordered by Singh to compete against Goldust in a losing effort. He teamed with Singh against Kurrgan and Luna Vachon in a No Contest on Sunday Night Heat. Afterwards, he continued to manage Singh until April 1999.

=== Independent circuit (1999–present) ===
After he was released from the WWF, Márquez worked for a number of wrestling promotions.

On February 2, 1997, Márquez defeated Bodacious Pretty Boy in Baltimore, Maryland for Mid-Eastern Wrestling Federation.

He went back to ECW, appearing twice on their TV shows. On the January 2, 1999 edition of ECW's Hardcore TV, Márquez lost to Yoshihiro Tajiri. He also appeared on ECW on TNN on December 17, 1999, wrestling Super Calo and Hidaka in a three-way match. That match ended in a no-contest.

He also worked for Jersey All Pro Wrestling under his real name. He competed there from 1999 to 2000 and was part of a group known as The "New Freebirds" with Don Montoya and Reckless Youth.

In 2003 and 2004, he wrestled for World Wrestling Council in Puerto Rico and won their World Junior Heavyweight Championship three times. From 2005 to 2006, Márquez wrestled in the Puerto Rican wrestling promotion International Wrestling Association.

Márquez wrestled, and taught at the Main Event Training Center in Fort Lauderdale, Florida. His first major storyline in CCW began when he got involved in a kayfabe fight confrontation between Cash Money Alex G, the head trainer of CCW's Bodyslam University, training facility, and several female graduates of the training program. When Alex G attacked the women, Márquez defended them, offering to train them himself. He also challenged Alex G to a match on September 29, 2007, in which he defeated Alex G.

Márquez was the referee for the Ultimate Warrior vs. Orlando Jordan match in Barcelona, Spain for NWE on June 25, 2008. On July 20, the end of the Spanish tour, he revived the "Ubas" gimmick for one night only in Pontevedra, in a loss to Ultimo Dragon.

=== Controversy ===
Márquez was subject to controversy when one of his trainee's, Chelsea Durden accused him of sexual assault while he was a trainer at CCW's Main Event Training Centre. Many other female aspiring pro wrestlers training at the facility under Márquez made similar accusations but as of yet only Durden’s have been brought before a judge in court (which can be found through public records).

== Personal life ==
Márquez stated in a 1998 interview for the World Wrestling Federation's website that he had committed a crime in his home of Ecuador in 1991. In 1999, he was detained for three days in Newark, New Jersey when he was unable to prove his citizenship when entering the United States from Ecuador, but he was released without charges.

Márquez has been involved with training several wrestlers. He helped some new talent in CCW, such as JT Flash, Kaotic Romeo Razel Quevedo, Celeste Bonin, and Dirty White Boy. In addition, he and Super Crazy were the trainers for IWA Puerto Rico wrestler Cruzz.

== Championships and accomplishments ==
- Coastal Championship Wrestling
  - CCW Heavyweight Championship (1 time)
  - Southeastern Heavyweight Championship (1 time)
- Pennsylvania Championship Wrestling
  - PCW Junior Heavyweight Championship (1 time)
- Universal Wrestling Association
  - UWA World Junior Heavyweight Championship (2 times)
- World Wrestling Council
  - WWC World Junior Heavyweight Championship (5 times)
- World Xtreme Wrestling
  - WXW Tag Team Championship (1 time) - with Reggie Rhythm
- Wrestling Alliance Revolution
  - WAR World Championship (1 time)
