= Sign Guy Dudley =

American marketing professional (born 1972)

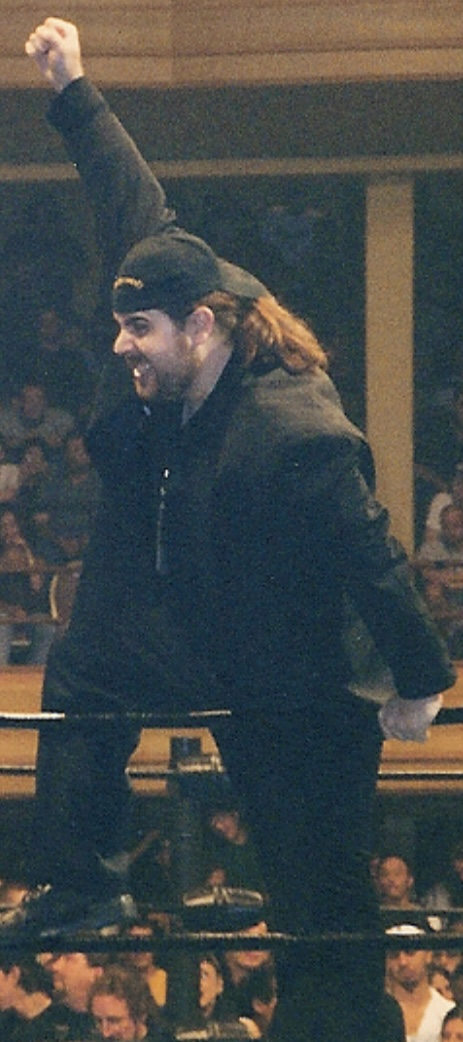
- Lou D'Angeli performing as "Lou E. Dangerously" in Extreme Championship Wrestling in August 2000

Personal information
- Born: Lou D'Angeli; August 19, 1972 (age 54) Philadelphia, Pennsylvania, U.S.
- Education: University of Hartford

Professional wrestling career
- Ring name(s): Lou E. Dangerously; Sign Guy Dudley
- Billed height: 5 ft 7 in (170 cm)
- Billed weight: 200 lb (91 kg)
- Billed from: "Dudleyville"; Scarsdale, New York
- Debut: 1995
- Retired: 2003

Lou D'Angeli (born August 19, 1972) is an American marketing professional and retired professional wrestling manager. He is director of marketing and public relations for Cirque du Soleil in Las Vegas, as well as the vice president of marketing for Anthem Entertainment. He is best known for his time performing as a manager in the Philadelphia, Pennsylvania-based professional wrestling promotion Extreme Championship Wrestling from 1995 to 2001 under the ring names Sign Guy Dudley and Lou E. Dangerously.

== Professional wrestling career ==
=== Extreme Championship Wrestling (1995–2001) ===
==== The Dudley Brothers (1995–1999) ====
Before being publicly hired by ECW, D'Angeli was an ECW "fan" that came dressed like a Dudley family member, holding up signs like "Welcome to Dudley World" and sitting near other very well known ECW fans like Hat Guy and the original ECW Sign Guy. In reality, D'Angeli was already on ECW's payroll and was planted in the crowd to further the Dudley Family angle. D'Angeli would go on to be trained as a manager by Tommy Dreamer and Tazz.

D'Angeli started out in ECW as Sign Guy Dudley, the manager of the Dudley Boyz and member of the Dudley family. He led Buh Buh Ray and D-Von Dudley to 8 ECW World Tag Team Championship reigns before they left for World Wrestling Federation (WWF).

==== The Dangerous Alliance (1999–2001) ====
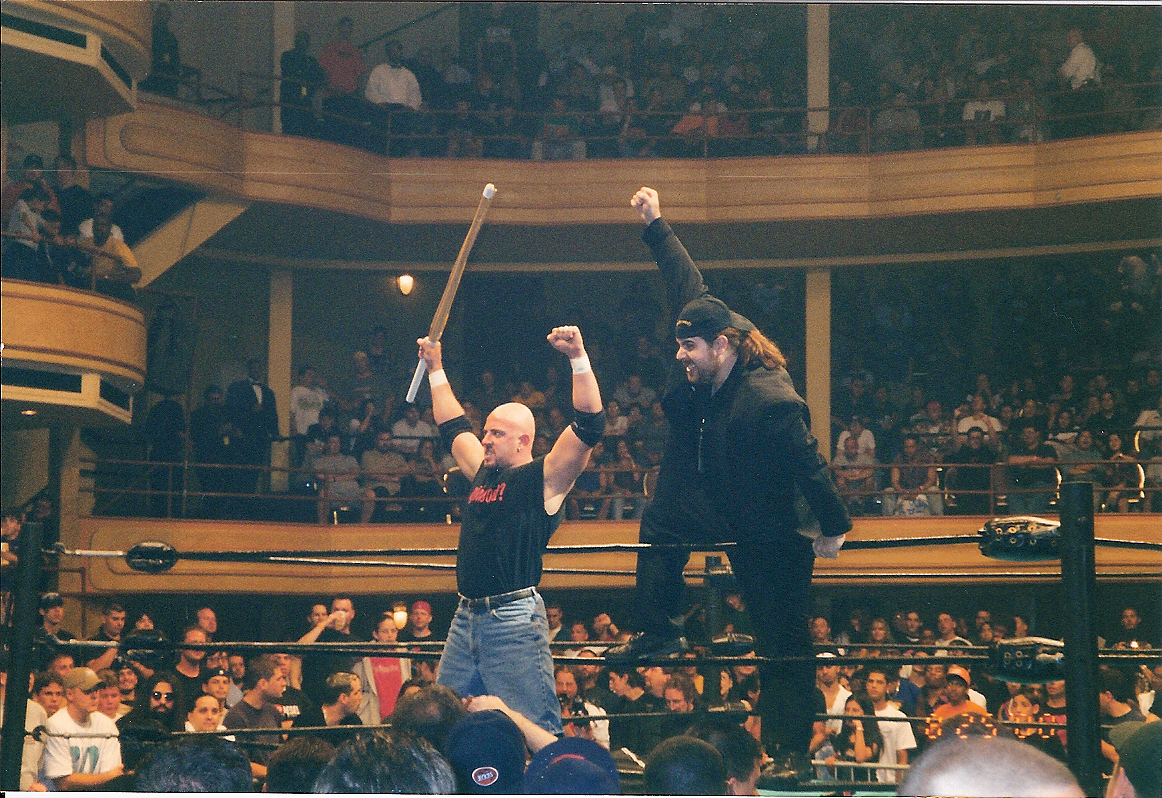
D'Angeli (right) as Lou E. Dangerously with Justin Credible in 2000

In October 1999 at Re-enter the Sandman, D'Angeli became a rip-off character of his boss, Paul Heyman, called "Lou E. Dangerously", with the gimmick of a giant cell phone (Heyman's ring name when a manager in World Championship Wrestling and early ECW was Paul E. Dangerously). As Dangerously, D'Angeli is known for several run-ins with Billy Corgan from The Smashing Pumpkins. On 22 July 2000, Corgan took to the ring at a match in Peoria, Illinois to play the national anthem, but Dangerously interrupted and harangued him, ending in Corgan hitting him over the head with an acoustic guitar. D'Angeli managed the tag team of Julio Dinero and E. Z. Money, which became Hot Commodity with the addition of Chris Hamrick and Elektra. He also managed Chris Chetti for a short stint in late 2000. D'Angeli appeared onstage before a Smashing Pumpkins gig in Philadelphia in October 2007, baiting the crowd.

He also refounded the Dangerous Alliance in December 1999.

=== Independent circuit (2001–2003; 2010; 2012) ===
When ECW went bankrupt, Lou went to work for other pro wrestling companies such as Combat Zone Wrestling, PWF and MECW. At one point D'Angeli was working with Steve Corino on booking the PWF. D'Angeli last appeared in a ring as a manager in February 2003 with Alexis Laree (Mickie James) and Justin Credible. D'Angeli had a cameo at the 2006 WWE ECW One Night Stand PPV when Rob Van Dam defeated John Cena for the WWE Title.

More recently D'Angeli appeared as part of Montel Vontavious Porter's entourage on Saturday Night's Main Event XXXV from Madison Square Garden when Evander Holyfield, in place of MVP, had a boxing match with Matt Hardy.

Lou appeared as Lou E. Dangerously at ACID FEST in honor of Trent Acid on July 10, 2010.

In March 2012 Lou returned to wrestling with Billy Corgan's group Resistance Pro based out of Chicago. He was brought in to specifically write for the shows as well as help talent given his performing and promoting history with ECW and WWE.

== Marketing career ==
D'Angeli works as the director of marketing and public relations for the Cirque Du Soleil shows based out of Las Vegas, Nevada.

D'Angeli worked for World Wrestling Entertainment in marketing until August 15, 2010. He was made Director of Live Events Promotions & Booking in June 2006, before becoming Director of Promotions and Event Marketing in May 2007.

Prior to being recruited to work for WWE and after ECW, D'Angeli worked for Comcast Spectacor/Global Spectrum as director of marketing and assistant general manager in several arenas throughout the United States, including the Wachovia Center, then the Budweiser Events Center in Loveland, Colo from 2003, and finally the Liacouras Center in March 2006.

In addition to his work for Cirque De Soleil, D'Angeli works as the vice president of marketing for Anthem Entertainment and by extension, Impact Wrestling. During his time with Impact he tried to reach big names to work with the promotion, including CM Punk and Mercedes Moné and set the stage for Trinity, who signed with the promotion and became one time Knockouts Champion. He was released in May 2024.
