= The Gangstas =

Professional wrestling tag team

Tag team
- Members: New Jack; Mustafa Saed; D'Lo Brown; Killer Kyle
- Billed heights: 6 ft 0 in (1.83 m) – New Jack; 6 ft 4 in (1.93 m) - Mustafa
- Combined billed weight: 505 lb (229 kg)
- Hometown: Los Angeles, California
- Billed from: South Central, Los Angeles, California
- Debut: June 1994
- Disbanded: July 1997

The Gangstas was a professional wrestling tag team and stable, consisting of New Jack and Mustafa Saed in Extreme Championship Wrestling (ECW). The group originally started as a three-man group with D'Lo Brown in Smoky Mountain Wrestling (SMW), before evolving into a four-man group with Killer Kyle.

== Professional wrestling career ==
=== North Georgia Wrestling Alliance (1994) ===
The Gangstas was formed by New Jack and Mustafa Saed in North Georgia Wrestling Alliance in 1994. They would win their Tag Team Championship, but quickly vacated them upon leaving the promotion that July.

=== Smoky Mountain Wrestling (1994–1995) ===
Upon arriving in Smoky Mountain Wrestling in July 1994 alongside D-Lo Brown, they would cut promos about activist Medgar Evers and O. J. Simpson to infuriate the southern white crowd. Ring announcers would, on more than one occasion, confuse their hometown as being Louisiana (LA) instead of Los Angeles (L.A.) which would entice New Jack to verbally abuse the announcer. Killer Kyle would join the Gangstas in March 1995 during their feud with Jim Cornette and Bob Armstrong. They would primarily feud with the Rock 'n' Roll Express, The Thugs, and PG-13.

The controversy of the gimmick, among other things, led to the end of the friendship between Mark Madden and SMW promoter Jim Cornette and their ongoing feud to this day, as Madden--who at the time was coming off the heels of getting Bill Watts fired from World Championship Wrestling after informing Hank Aaron of Watts' employment within the Turner Broadcasting System following publications of controversial comments made by Watts--had called the Gangstas gimmick racist.

=== Extreme Championship Wrestling (1995–1997) ===
New Jack and Mustafa left SMW in June 1995, in a controversial fashion, which escalated the long-standing dispute between Cornette and Paul Heyman. In ECW, the now two-man team were known for bringing weapons such as guitars, crutches and staple guns to the ring in trash cans and shopping carts, while the song "Natural Born Killaz" would play through their matches. In a distinct difference from SMW, they were embraced as heroes by the northeastern crowd, and the team went on to hold the ECW World Tag Team Championship two times.

==== Split, solo careers and reunion (1997–1999) ====
The team split in 1997 when Mustafa left ECW. New Jack found a new partner in John Kronus of The Eliminators, who like New Jack was left without a partner after the other half of The Eliminators, Perry Saturn, left ECW. Kronus and New Jack became known as the Gangstanators (a portmanteau of Gangstas and Eliminators) and held the ECW World Tag Team Championship once. With Mustafa gone, New Jack went on to greater fame, continuing to use the Gangsta gimmick. New Jack became a surprise attraction at Pay-Per-Views, and was known for answering open challenges by heels and doing run-ins to save babyfaces with his various weapons, to the crowd's delight. In 1999, The two former teammates began a brief feud when Mustafa returned at Crossing the Line '99.

=== Independent circuit (2008) ===
On May 24, 2008, the Gangstas reunited for the first time in over 10 years at Xtreme Pro Wrestling's "Cold Day in Hell" in a match against the Westside NGZ.

=== Total Nonstop Action Wrestling (2010) ===
On August 8, 2010, the team made an appearance at Total Nonstop Action Wrestling's ECW reunion show, Hardcore Justice, assaulting Team 3D and Joel Gertner after a match. After the beatdown, Team 3D, The Gangstas, Balls Mahoney and Axl Rotten celebrated in the ring.

== Championships and accomplishments ==
- Extreme Championship Wrestling
  - ECW World Tag Team Championship (2 times)
- North Georgia Wrestling Alliance
  - NGWA Tag Team Championship (1 time)
- Smoky Mountain Wrestling
  - SMW Tag Team Championship (1 time)

== See also ==
- Gangstanators
