= List of ECW supercards and pay-per-view events =

Eastern Championship Wrestling/Extreme Championship Wrestling (ECW) is a defunct professional wrestling promotion based in Philadelphia, Pennsylvania that operated from 1992 to 2001. Over the course of its existence, ECW staged regular supercards and, beginning in 1997, pay-per-view events. From February 1992 to August 1994, events were promoted under the Eastern Championship Wrestling banner; from August 1994 to January 2001, the Extreme Championship Wrestling name was used.

In 2003, World Wrestling Entertainment (now known as WWE) purchased the assets of ECW, including the video libraries of all previous ECW pay-per-views, and the ownership rights of the names of these events. To date, as of 2026, WWE has only promoted 2 events using the name of a former ECW PPV. The first was Heat Wave, used since 2022 for the NXT brand and has since rotated between a television special and a live-streaming event as WWE ceased airing NXT pay-per-views from 2022 and has aired solely on the WWE Network and Peacock. They have also used the name of Wrestlepalooza, first used in 2025, which was the first WWE PLE to air on the ESPN streaming app.

Beginning in 2014, nearly all of ECW pay-per-view events were made available on the WWE Network and Peacock.

== Events ==
=== 1992 ===
Date	Event	Type	Venue	Location	Final match
Eastern Championship Wrestling
February 25, 1992	Market Street Mayhem	Live event	Original Sports Bar	Philadelphia, Pennsylvania, United States	D. C. Drake and J. T. Smith vs. Johnny Hotbody and Larry Winters

=== 1993 ===
Date	Event	Type	Venue	Location	Final match
Eastern Championship Wrestling
January 23, 1993	Battle of the Belts	Live event	Radisson Hotel Philadelphia Northeast	Philadelphia, Pennsylvania, United States	Eddie Gilbert vs. Terry Funk
June 19, 1993	Super Summer Sizzler Spectacular	Live event	ECW Arena	Philadelphia, Pennsylvania, United States	Eddie Gilbert vs. Terry Funk
September 18, 1993	UltraClash	Live event	ECW Arena	Philadelphia, Pennsylvania, United States	Crash the Terminator and Miguelito Pérez vs. The Headhunters (Headhunter A and Headhunter B)
October 1, 1993	NWA Bloodfest	Live event	ECW Arena	Philadelphia, Pennsylvania, United States	Jimmy Snuka vs. Terry Funk
October 2, 1993	NWA Bloodfest	Live event	ECW Arena	Philadelphia, Pennsylvania, United States	Badd Company (Pat Tanaka and Paul Diamond) vs. The Bad Breed (Axl Rotten and Ian Rotten) vs. The Public Enemy (Johnny Grunge and Rocco Rock)
November 12, 1993	Terror at Tabor	Live event	Tabor Community Center	Philadelphia, Pennsylvania, United States	Johnny Grunge vs. Tommy Dreamer
November 13, 1993	November to Remember	Live event	ECW Arena	Philadelphia, Pennsylvania, United States	King Kong Bundy and Terry Funk vs. Road Warrior Hawk and Sabu
November 14, 1993	ASWA/ECW/MEWF Supershow	Live event	Kenwood High School	Essex, Maryland, United States	Jake Roberts vs. Mr. Hughes
December 26, 1993	Holiday Hell	Live event	ECW Arena	Philadelphia, Pennsylvania, United States	Battle royal

=== 1994 ===
Date	Event	Type	Venue	Location	Final match
Eastern Championship Wrestling
February 5, 1994	The Night the Line Was Crossed	Live event	ECW Arena	Philadelphia, Pennsylvania, United States	Terry Funk vs. Sabu vs. Shane Douglas
March 26, 1994	Ultimate Jeopardy	Live event	Valley Forge Music Fair	Devon, Pennsylvania, United States	Terry Funk, Kevin Sullivan, Road Warrior Hawk and The Tazmaniac vs. Mr. Hughes, The Public Enemy (Johnny Grunge and Rocco Rock) and Shane Douglas
May 14, 1994	When Worlds Collide	Live event	ECW Arena	Philadelphia, Pennsylvania, United States	Arn Anderson and Terry Funk vs. Bobby Eaton and Sabu
June 24, 1994	Hostile City Showdown	Live event	ECW Arena	Philadelphia, Pennsylvania, United States	Cactus Jack vs. Sabu
July 16, 1994	Heatwave '94: the Battle for the Future	Live event	ECW Arena	Philadelphia, Pennsylvania, United States	Dory Funk Jr. and Terry Funk vs. The Public Enemy (Johnny Grunge and Rocco Rock)
August 13, 1994	Hardcore Heaven	Live event	ECW Arena	Philadelphia, Pennsylvania, United States	Cactus Jack vs. Terry Funk
August 27, 1994	NWA World Title Tournament	Live event	ECW Arena	Philadelphia, Pennsylvania, United States	2 Cold Scorpio vs. Shane Douglas
Extreme Championship Wrestling
November 5, 1994	November to Remember	Live event	ECW Arena	Philadelphia, Pennsylvania, United States	2 Cold Scorpio vs. Chris Benoit
December 17, 1994	Holiday Hell	Live event	ECW Arena	Philadelphia, Pennsylvania, United States	The Public Enemy (Johnny Grunge and Rocco Rock) vs. Sabu and The Tazmaniac

=== 1995 ===
Date	Event	Type	Venue	Location	Final match
Extreme Championship Wrestling
February 4, 1995	Double Tables	Live event	ECW Arena	Philadelphia, Pennsylvania, United States	The Public Enemy (Johnny Grunge and Rocco Rock) vs. Sabu and The Tazmaniac
February 25, 1995	Return of the Funker	Live event	ECW Arena	Philadelphia, Pennsylvania, United States	Cactus Jack vs. D. C. Drake
March 18, 1995	Extreme Warfare	Live event	ECW Arena	Philadelphia, Pennsylvania, United States	Cactus Jack and Shane Douglas vs. Terry Funk and The Sandman
April 8, 1995	Three Way Dance	Live event	ECW Arena	Philadelphia, Pennsylvania, United States	The Triple Threat (Chris Benoit and Dean Malenko) vs. The Public Enemy (Johnny Grunge and Rocco Rock) vs. Rick Steiner and The Tazmaniac
April 15, 1995	Hostile City Showdown	Live event	ECW Arena	Philadelphia, Pennsylvania, United States	Cactus Jack vs. Terry Funk
May 13, 1995	Enter Sandman	Live event	ECW Arena	Philadelphia, Pennsylvania, United States	The Public Enemy (Johnny Grunge and Rocco Rock) vs. The Pitbulls (Pitbull #1 and Pitbull #2)
June 17, 1995	Barbed Wire, Hoodies & Chokeslams	Live event	ECW Arena	Philadelphia, Pennsylvania, United States	The Sandman vs. Cactus Jack
June 30, 1995	Mountain Top Madness	Live event	Flagstaff Ballroom	Jim Thorpe, Pennsylvania, United States	The Sandman vs. Tommy Dreamer
July 1, 1995	Hardcore Heaven	Live event	ECW Arena	Philadelphia, Pennsylvania, United States	The Gangstas (Mustafa and New Jack) vs. The Public Enemy (Johnny Grunge and Rocco Rock)
July 15, 1995	Heatwave '95: Rage in the Cage!	Live event	ECW Arena	Philadelphia, Pennsylvania, United States	The Gangstas (Mustafa and New Jack) vs. The Public Enemy (Johnny Grunge and Rocco Rock)
August 5, 1995	Wrestlepalooza	Live event	ECW Arena	Philadelphia, Pennsylvania, United States	The Gangstas (Mustafa and New Jack) vs. The Public Enemy (Johnny Grunge and Rocco Rock)
September 16, 1995	Gangstas Paradise	Live event	ECW Arena	Philadelphia, Pennsylvania, United States	2 Cold Scorpio, New Jack and The Sandman vs. Mikey Whipwreck and The Public Enemy (Johnny Grunge and Rocco Rock)
October 7, 1995	South Philly Jam	Live event	ECW Arena	Philadelphia, Pennsylvania, United States	Raven and Stevie Richards vs. The Public Enemy (Johnny Grunge and Rocco Rock) vs. The Gangstas (Mustafa Saed and New Jack)
November 18, 1995	November to Remember	Live event	ECW Arena	Philadelphia, Pennsylvania, United States	Cactus Jack and Raven vs. Terry Funk and Tommy Dreamer
December 9, 1995	December to Dismember	Live event	ECW Arena	Philadelphia, Pennsylvania, United States	Raven's Nest (Raven, Stevie Richards, The Eliminators (Kronus and Saturn) and The Heavenly Bodies (Jimmy Del Ray and Tom Prichard) vs. The Pitbulls (Pitbull #1 and Pitbull #2), The Public Enemy (Johnny Grunge and Rocco Rock) and Tommy Dreamer
December 29, 1995	Holiday Hell	Live event	Lost Battalion Hall	New York City, New York, United States	Cactus Jack vs. Sabu

=== 1996 ===
Date	Event	Type	Venue	Location	Final match
Extreme Championship Wrestling
January 5, 1996	House Party	Live event	ECW Arena	Philadelphia, Pennsylvania, United States	The Gangstas (Mustafa and New Jack) vs. The Public Enemy (Johnny Grunge and Rocco Rock)
February 3, 1996	Big Apple Blizzard Blast	Live event	Lost Battalion Hall	New York City, New York, United States	2 Cold Scorpio and The Sandman vs. The Gangstas (Mustafa and New Jack)
February 17, 1996	CyberSlam	Live event	ECW Arena	Philadelphia, Pennsylvania, United States	Raven vs. The Sandman
February 23, 1996	Just Another Night	Live event	Briarcliffe Fieldhouse	Glenolden, Pennsylvania, United States	Raven vs. Shane Douglas
March 8, 1996	Big Ass Extreme Bash	Live event	Lost Battalion Hall	New York City, New York, United States	Raven vs. The Sandman
March 9, 1996	Big Ass Extreme Bash	Live event	ECW Arena	Philadelphia, Pennsylvania, United States	2 Cold Scorpio and The Sandman vs. The Gangstas (Mustafa and New Jack) vs. The Headhunters (Headhunter A and Headhunter B)
April 13, 1996	Massacre on Queens Boulevard	Live event	Lost Battalion Hall	New York City, New York, United States	2 Cold Scorpio and The Sandman vs. The Gangstas (Mustafa and New Jack) vs. The Headhunters (Headhunter A and Headhunter B)
April 20, 1996	Hostile City Showdown	Live event	ECW Arena	Philadelphia, Pennsylvania, United States	Raven vs. Shane Douglas
May 11, 1996	A Matter of Respect	Live event	ECW Arena	Philadelphia, Pennsylvania, United States	Brian Lee and The Eliminators (Kronus and Saturn) vs. The Gangstas (Mustafa and New Jack) and Tommy Dreamer
June 1, 1996	Fight the Power	Live event	ECW Arena	Philadelphia, Pennsylvania, United States	The Eliminators (Kronus and Saturn) vs. The Gangstas (Mustafa and New Jack)
June 22, 1996	Hardcore Heaven	Live event	ECW Arena	Philadelphia, Pennsylvania, United States	Rob Van Dam vs. Sabu
July 13, 1996	Heat Wave	Live event	ECW Arena	Philadelphia, Pennsylvania, United States	Raven's Nest (Raven, Brian Lee and Stevie Richards) vs. Terry Gordy, The Sandman and Tommy Dreamer
August 3, 1996	The Doctor Is In	Live event	ECW Arena	Philadelphia, Pennsylvania, United States	Rob Van Dam vs. Sabu
August 10, 1996	ECW vs. IWA vs. True FMW: Total War	Live event	Yokohama Cultural Gymnasium	Yokohama, Japan	Raven and Stevie Richards vs. Terry Gordy and Tommy Dreamer
August 11, 1996	ECW vs. IWA vs. True FMW: Total War	Live event	Korakuen Hall	Tokyo, Japan	Tarzan Goto vs. Buh Buh Ray Dudley
August 23, 1996	Requiem for a Pitbull	Live event	Bodyslams Arena	Reading, Pennsylvania, United States	Rob Van Dam vs. Tommy Dreamer
August 24, 1996	Natural Born Killaz	Live event	ECW Arena	Philadelphia, Pennsylvania, United States	The Gangstas (Mustafa and New Jack) vs. The Eliminators (Kronus and Saturn)
September 13, 1996	Unlucky Lottery	Live event	Flagstaff Ballroom	Jim Thorpe, Pennsylvania, United States	Rob Van Dam vs. Sabu
September 14, 1996	When Worlds Collide	Live event	ECW Arena	Philadelphia, Pennsylvania, United States	Brian Lee and The Eliminators (Kronus and Saturn) vs. Steve Williams, Terry Gordy and Tommy Dreamer
October 5, 1996	Ultimate Jeopardy	Live event	ECW Arena	Philadelphia, Pennsylvania, United States	Brian Lee and Stevie Richards vs. The Sandman and Tommy Dreamer
October 26, 1996	High Incident	Live event	ECW Arena	Philadelphia, Pennsylvania, United States	Brian Lee vs. Tommy Dreamer
November 16, 1996	November to Remember	Live event	ECW Arena	Philadelphia, Pennsylvania, United States	Brian Lee and Shane Douglas vs. Terry Funk and Tommy Dreamer
December 7, 1996	Holiday Hell	Live event	ECW Arena	Philadelphia, Pennsylvania, United States	The Sandman vs. Raven

=== 1997 ===
Date	Event	Type	Venue	Location	Final match
Extreme Championship Wrestling
January 11, 1997	House Party	Live event	ECW Arena	Philadelphia, Pennsylvania, United States	Shane Douglas vs. Pitbull #1
February 1, 1997	Crossing the Line Again	Live event	ECW Arena	Philadelphia, Pennsylvania, United States	The Pitbulls (Pitbull #1 and Pitbull #2) and Tommy Dreamer vs. The Triple Threat (Shane Douglas, Brian Lee and Chris Candido)
February 21, 1997	CyberSlam	Live event	Lost Battalion Hall	New York City, New York, United States	The Eliminators (Kronus and Saturn) vs. Rob Van Dam and Sabu
February 22, 1997	CyberSlam	Live event	ECW Arena	Philadelphia, Pennsylvania, United States	Chris Candido vs. Sabu
February 28, 1997	Mountain Top Madness	Live event	Flagstaff Ballroom	Jim Thorpe, Pennsylvania, United States	Chris Candido vs. Sabu
March 15, 1997	Hostile City Showdown	Live event	ECW Arena	Philadelphia, Pennsylvania, United States	Raven vs. Stevie Richards vs. Tommy Dreamer
April 13, 1997	Barely Legal	Pay-per-view	ECW Arena	Philadelphia, Pennsylvania, United States	Raven vs. Terry Funk
May 10, 1997	Chapter 2	Live event	ECW Arena	Philadelphia, Pennsylvania, United States	Terry Funk vs. Raven vs. Stevie Richards vs. The Sandman
May 17, 1997	The Buffalo Invasion	Live event	Burt Flickinger Center	Buffalo, New York, United States	Terry Funk vs. Raven vs. Stevie Richards vs. The Sandman
June 7, 1997	Wrestlepalooza	Live event	ECW Arena	Philadelphia, Pennsylvania, United States	The Eliminators (Kronus and Saturn) vs. The Dudley Boyz (Buh Buh Ray Dudley and D-Von Dudley)
June 28, 1997	Orgy of Violence	Live event	ECW Arena	Philadelphia, Pennsylvania, United States	Rob Van Dam and Sabu vs. The Sandman and Tommy Dreamer
July 19, 1997	Heat Wave	Live event	ECW Arena	Philadelphia, Pennsylvania, United States	Jerry Lawler, Rob Van Dam and Sabu vs. Rick Rude, The Sandman and Tommy Dreamer
August 9, 1997	Born to be Wired	Live event	ECW Arena	Philadelphia, Pennsylvania, United States	Terry Funk vs. Sabu
August 17, 1997	Hardcore Heaven	Pay-per-view	War Memorial Auditorium	Fort Lauderdale, Florida, United States	Sabu vs. Shane Douglas vs. Terry Funk
September 11, 1997	Terry Funk's WrestleFest	Live event	Maxor Pharmacies Coliseum	Amarillo, Texas, United States	Bret Hart vs. Terry Funk
September 20, 1997	As Good as It Gets	Live event	ECW Arena	Philadelphia, Pennsylvania, United States	The Dudley Boyz (Buh Buh Ray Dudley and D-Von Dudley) vs. The Gangstanators (Kronus and New Jack)
November 8, 1997	Ultimate Jeopardy	Live event	ECW Arena	Philadelphia, Pennsylvania, United States	Rob Van Dam and Sabu vs. Taz and Tommy Dreamer
November 30, 1997	November to Remember	Pay-per-view	Golden Dome	Monaca, Pennsylvania, United States	Bam Bam Bigelow vs. Shane Douglas
December 6, 1997	Better Than Ever	Live event	ECW Arena	Philadelphia, Pennsylvania, United States	Rob Van Dam and Sabu vs. Taz and Tommy Dreamer

=== 1998 ===
Date	Event	Type	Venue	Location	Final match
Extreme Championship Wrestling
January 10, 1998	House Party	Live event	ECW Arena	Philadelphia, Pennsylvania, United States	Sabu vs. The Sandman
January 31, 1998	Hostile City Showdown	Live event	ECW Arena	Philadelphia, Pennsylvania, United States	Rob Van Dam and Sabu vs. The Dudley Boyz (Buh Buh Ray Dudley and D-Von Dudley) vs. The Gangstanators (Kronus and New Jack) vs. The Sandman and Tommy Dreamer
February 21, 1998	CyberSlam	Live event	ECW Arena	Philadelphia, Pennsylvania, United States	Bam Bam Bigelow and Shane Douglas vs. Rob Van Dam and Sabu
March 1, 1998	Living Dangerously	Pay-per-view	Asbury Park Convention Hall	Asbury Park, New Jersey, United States	Al Snow and Lance Storm vs. The Triple Threat (Shane Douglas and Chris Candido)
May 3, 1998	Wrestlepalooza	Pay-per-view	Cobb County Civic Center	Marietta, Georgia, United States	Shane Douglas vs. Al Snow
May 14, 1998	It Ain't Seinfeld	Live event	Elks Lodge 878	New York City, New York, United States	Dudley Boyz (Big Dick Dudley, Buh Buh Ray Dudley and D-Von Dudley) vs. Spike Dudley, The Sandman and Tommy Dreamer
May 16, 1998	A Matter of Respect	Live event	ECW Arena	Philadelphia, Pennsylvania, United States	Dudley Boyz (Big Dick Dudley, Buh Buh Ray Dudley and D-Von Dudley) vs. Spike Dudley, The Sandman and Tommy Dreamer
August 2, 1998	Heat Wave	Pay-per-view	Hara Arena	Dayton, Ohio, United States	Dudley Boyz (Big Dick Dudley, Buh Buh Ray Dudley and D-Von Dudley) vs. Spike Dudley, The Sandman and Tommy Dreamer
September 19, 1998	UltraClash	Live event	ECW Arena	Philadelphia, Pennsylvania, United States	Masato Tanaka, Rob Van Dam and Sabu vs. The Triple Threat (Shane Douglas, Bam Bam Bigelow and Chris Candido)
November 1, 1998	November to Remember	Pay-per-view	Lakefront Arena	New Orleans, Louisiana, United States	Rob Van Dam, Sabu and Taz vs. The Triple Threat (Shane Douglas, Bam Bam Bigelow and Chris Candido)
December 12, 1998	ECW/FMW Supershow	Pay-per-view	Korakuen Hall	Tokyo, Japan	Hayabusa and Tommy Dreamer vs. Rob Van Dam and Sabu
December 13, 1998	ECW/FMW Supershow	Pay-per-view	Korakuen Hall	Tokyo, Japan	Rob Van Dam and Sabu vs. The Dudley Boyz (Buh Buh Ray Dudley and D-Von Dudley)

=== 1999 ===
Date	Event	Type	Venue	Location	Final match
Extreme Championship Wrestling
January 10, 1999	Guilty as Charged	Pay-per-view	Millennium Theatre	Kissimmee, Florida, United States	Shane Douglas vs. Taz
January 16, 1999	House Party	Live event	ECW Arena	Philadelphia, Pennsylvania, United States	Skull Von Krush vs. Sid
February 12, 1999	Crossing the Line	Live event	Elks Lodge 878	New York City, New York, United States	Rob Van Dam vs. Jerry Lynn
March 21, 1999	Living Dangerously	Pay-per-view	Asbury Park Convention Hall	Asbury Park, New Jersey, United States	Taz vs. Sabu
April 3, 1999	CyberSlam	Live event	ECW Arena	Philadelphia, Pennsylvania, United States	Mr. Mustafa and The Dudley Boyz (Buh Buh Ray Dudley and D-Von Dudley) vs. New Jack and The Hardcore Chair Swingin' Freaks (Axl Rotten and Balls Mahoney)
May 15, 1999	Break the Barrier	Live event	ECW Arena	Philadelphia, Pennsylvania, United States	Battle royal
May 16, 1999	Hardcore Heaven	Pay-per-view	Mid-Hudson Civic Center	Poughkeepsie, New York, United States	Taz vs. Buh Buh Ray Dudley
June 26, 1999	Hostile City Showdown	Live event	ECW Arena	Philadelphia, Pennsylvania, United States	Jerry Lynn and Sabu vs. The Impact Players (Justin Credible and Lance Storm)
July 18, 1999	Heat Wave	Pay-per-view	Hara Arena	Dayton, Ohio, United States	Jerry Lynn and Rob Van Dam vs. The Impact Players (Justin Credible and Lance Storm)
August 26, 1999	The Last Show at the Madhouse	Live event	Elks Lodge 878	New York City, New York, United States	The Dudley Boyz (Buh Buh Ray Dudley and D-Von Dudley) vs. Raven and Tommy Dreamer
September 19, 1999	Anarchy Rulz	Pay-per-view	Odeum Expo Center	Villa Park, Illinois, United States	Rob Van Dam vs. Balls Mahoney
October 23, 1999	Re-enter The Sandman	Live event	ECW Arena	Philadelphia, Pennsylvania, United States	Raven and Tommy Dreamer vs. The Impact Players (Justin Credible and Lance Storm)
November 7, 1999	November to Remember	Pay-per-view	Burt Flickinger Center	Buffalo, New York, United States	Raven, The Sandman and Tommy Dreamer vs. Rhino and The Impact Players (Justin Credible and Lance Storm)

=== 2000 ===
Date	Event	Type	Venue	Location	Final match
Extreme Championship Wrestling
January 9, 2000	Guilty as Charged	Pay-per-view	Boutwell Memorial Auditorium	Birmingham, Alabama, United States	Mike Awesome vs. Spike Dudley
March 12, 2000	Living Dangerously	Pay-per-view	O'Neill Center	Danbury, Connecticut, United States	Rhino vs. Super Crazy
April 16, 2000	Wrestlepalooza	Live event	Family Arena	St. Charles, Missouri, United States	Dusty Rhodes, New Jack, The Sandman and Tommy Dreamer vs. The Network (Jack Victory, Rhino, Steve Corino and Yoshihiro Tajiri)
April 22, 2000	CyberSlam	Live event	ECW Arena	Philadelphia, Pennsylvania, United States	Tommy Dreamer vs. Justin Credible
May 14, 2000	Hardcore Heaven	Pay-per-view	The Eagles Ballroom	Milwaukee, Wisconsin, United States	Justin Credible vs. Lance Storm
June 23, 2000	Midwest Massacre	Live event	The Eagles Ballroom	Milwaukee, Wisconsin, United States	Rhino vs. Rob Van Dam
June 24, 2000	Midwest Massacre	Live event	Odeum Expo Center	Villa Park, Illinois, United States	Little Guido vs. Rob Van Dam
July 16, 2000	Heat Wave	Pay-per-view	Grand Olympic Auditorium	Los Angeles, California, United States	Justin Credible vs. Tommy Dreamer
August 19, 2000	A New Era Begins	Live event	ECW Arena	Philadelphia, Pennsylvania, United States	Justin Credible and Rhino vs. Kid Kash and Rob Van Dam
August 25, 2000	Midtown Massacre	Live event	Hammerstein Ballroom	New York City, New York, United States	Jerry Lynn and Tommy Dreamer vs. Simon Diamond and Swinger vs. the Unholy Alliance (Mikey Whipwreck and Yoshihiro Tajiri)
August 26, 2000	Midtown Massacre	Live event	Hammerstein Ballroom	New York City, New York, United States	Rhino vs. Kid Kash
October 1, 2000	Anarchy Rulz	Pay-per-view	Roy Wilkins Auditorium	Saint Paul, Minnesota, United States	Justin Credible vs. Jerry Lynn
October 7, 2000	Beer, Blood, Babes and Barbed Wire	Live event	The Eagles Ballroom	Milwaukee, Wisconsin, United States	E. Z. Money vs. Rob Van Dam
November 5, 2000	November to Remember	Pay-per-view	Odeum Expo Center	Villa Park, Illinois, United States	Jerry Lynn vs. Justin Credible vs. Steve Corino vs. The Sandman
December 3, 2000	Massacre on 34th Street	Pay-per-view	Hammerstein Ballroom	New York City, New York, United States	Steve Corino vs. Jerry Lynn vs. Justin Credible
December 23, 2000	Holiday Hell	Live event	ECW Arena	Philadelphia, Pennsylvania, United States	Steve Corino vs. Justin Credible vs. The Sandman

=== 2001 ===
Date	Event	Type	Venue	Location	Final match
Extreme Championship Wrestling
January 7, 2001	Guilty as Charged	Pay-per-view	Hammerstein Ballroom	New York City, New York, United States	Jerry Lynn vs. Rob Van Dam
January 13, 2001	ECW's Final Show	Live event	Pine Bluff Convention Center	Pine Bluff, Arkansas, United States	Justin Credible vs. The Sandman

== Number of events by year ==
Overall total – 120

Number of ECW supercards and pay-per-view events
