= Hostile City Showdown (1996) =

1996 Extreme Championship Wrestling supercard event

- The ECW Arena.
- Promotion: Extreme Championship Wrestling
- Date: April 20, 1996 (aired April 23, April 30, and May 7, 1996)
- City: Philadelphia, Pennsylvania, US
- Venue: ECW Arena
- Attendance: 1,075

Event chronology
← Previous; Massacre on Queens Boulevard	Next → A Matter of Respect

Hostile City Showdown chronology
← Previous; 1995	Next → 1997

Hostile City Showdown (1996) was the third Hostile City Showdown professional wrestling supercard event produced by Extreme Championship Wrestling (ECW). It that took place on April 20, 1996 in the ECW Arena in Philadelphia, Pennsylvania in the United States.

Excerpts from Hostile City Showdown aired on episodes #157, #158, and #159 of the syndicated television show ECW Hardcore TV on April 23, April 30, and May 7, 1996. The full event was later released on VHS and DVD. In July 2019, the event was made available for streaming on the WWE Network. The bout between Rob Van Dam and Sabu appeared on the 2005 DVD Rob Van Dam – One of a Kind.

== Event ==
The event began with commentator Joey Styles interviewing the Gangstas in the ring. After the Gangstas insulted the Eliminators, the Eliminators came to the ring and brawled with the Gangstas.

The opening bout was a singles match between El Puerto Riqueño and Super Nova. The match ended in a no contest after the Eliminators interfered, performing Total Elimination on both men. After the Eliminators called out the Gangstas, the Gangstas came to the ring and brawled with the Eliminators once more. As the brawl ended, J.T. Smith attempted to sing "Fly Me to the Moon"; when D-Von Dudley attempted to give Smith a chair shot, Smith pulled his tag team partner Little Guido in front of him, with Guido taking the chair shot. Dudley then chased Smith backstage.

The second bout was a singles match between Billy Black and Mikey Whipwreck. Whipwreck won the bout by pinfall, giving Black a FrankenMikey followed by a small package.

The third bout was a tag team match between the Dudley Boyz and the Pitbulls. The match ended in a no contest when the Pitbulls gave Buh Buh Ray Dudley an aided superbomb then attempted to pin him, only for D-Von Dudley to give chair shots to both of the Pitbulls followed by the referee. Following the match, the Pitbulls gave the referee an aided superbomb then left the ring. D-Von Dudley then berated the other Dudley Brothers, eventually chasing Buh Buh Ray Dudley backstage.

The fourth bout was a singles match between Devon Storm and Taz. The match ended when Taz threw Storm out of the ring and through a table at ringside with a belly-to-belly suplex, resulting in Storm being counted out. After the match, Taz applied the Tazmission to Storm to choke him out unconscious.

The fifth bout was a singles match between Axl Rotten and Little Guido. Despite J.T. Smith interfering multiple times on Guido's behalf, Rotten won the match by pinfall following an inverted powerbomb.

The sixth bout was a tag team match pitting the Bruise Brothers against 2 Cold Scorpio and the Sandman. Scorpio and the Sandman won the bout by pinfall after delivering a moonsault press to one of the Bruise Brothers.

The seventh bout was a singles match between Brian Lee and Tommy Dreamer. The match ended when the Bruise Brothers interfered in the match, placing a cinderblock on Dreamer's groin which Lee then hit with a chair, enabling him to pin Dreamer.

The eighth bout was a singles match between Rob Van Dam and Sabu. Sabu won the bout by pinfall after giving Van Dam a chair shot followed by a triple jump moonsault. After the match, Sabu offered a handshake to Van Dam, only for Van Dam to refuse to shake his hand and walked away.

Raven defended the ECW World Heavyweight Championship against Shane Douglas in the main event. Before the match, Douglas revealed to Tommy Dreamer that his girlfriend, Beulah McGillicutty, was not pregnant as she had claimed, but was in fact cheating on him. After Dreamer demanded to know who Beulah was cheating on him with, Douglas' valet, Kimona Wanalaya, revealed it was her and then kissed Beulah. Dreamer then declared, "I'll take 'em both, I'm hardcore!" and kissed both Beulah and Kimona. Near the end of the match, Douglas applied a figure four leglock on Raven until Stevie Richards distracted the referee, allowing Bruise Brothers to attack Douglas and Raven hit Douglas with a loaded boot to retain the title. After the match, Douglas cut a promo on his obsession about the World Heavyweight Championship, leading to 2 Cold Scorpio coming out and objecting to Douglas' obsession about the World Heavyweight Championship but ignoring the ECW World Television Championship and then as Scorpio was leaving, Douglas turned into a villain by attacked Scorpio and nailed a belly-to-belly suplex and a piledriver to Scorpio on the title belt and Sandman tried to make the rescue but Douglas delivered him a second belly-to-belly suplex.

== Reception ==
Hostile City Showdown received mixed reviews from the critics. Shinobi of Wrestling Recaps rated it 8 out of 10, considering it " a really cool ECW show", adding that the show had "historical moments with RVD & Sabu’s first match", the controversial lesbian angle between Beulah McGillicutty and Kimona Wanalaya. He further added "The highlight for sure was the surprisingly good Raven/Douglas title match. The Eliminators vs Gangstas feud got pretty awesome with this show as well." Due to the highly sexual angles on the show, he considered it to be "one of those ECW shows that gives you a good idea of where the Attitude Era came from. A few stinker matches keeps the overall score down, but really the storyline progression, interesting characters, and compelling rivalries made this another really fun, interesting ECW show."

Wrestling 20 Years Ago staff rated it 5 out of 10, appreciating the first match of Rob Van Dam and Sabu and Taz's squash match while considering the rest of the event to be "frustrating".

The kiss between Beulah and Kimona at Hostile City Showdown aired on the April 30 episode of Hardcore TV, which led to numerous networks, including MSG and Sunshine Network, dropping the series on the basis that ECW had violated their content standards.

== Aftermath ==
Several matches at Hostile City Showdown would result in the beginning of new rivalries and continuation of several rivalries heading into the next major event A Matter of Respect. Shane Douglas' assault on 2 Cold Scorpio led to a match between the two for the World Television Championship, where Douglas defeated Scorpio for the title. Rob Van Dam's disrespect to Sabu led to a rematch between the two at A Matter of Respect, where RVD defeated Sabu to even the score and then Sabu walked out after the match refusing to shake hands with RVD. The rivalry between Axl Rotten and Full Blooded Italians continued as Rotten and Hack Meyers took on FBI in a tag team match at A Matter of Respect, which FBI won. The feud between Brian Lee and Tommy Dreamer and The Eliminators and The Gangstas continued as Dreamer and Gangstas defeated Lee and Eliminators in a six-man tag team match.

== Results ==
No.	Results	Stipulations	Times
1	El Puerto Riqueño vs. Super Nova ended in a no contest	Singles match	2:07
2	Mikey Whipwreck defeated Billy Black (with Damien Kane and Lady Alexander)	Singles match	7:09
3	The Dudley Boyz (Buh Buh Ray Dudley and D-Von Dudley) (with Chubby Dudley, Dances with Dudley, and Sign Guy Dudley) vs. the Pitbulls (Pitbull #1 and Pitbull #2) (with Francine) ended in a no contest	Tag team match	9:00
4	Taz (with Bill Alfonso and Team Taz) defeated Devon Storm by count out	Singles match	4:51
5	Axl Rotten defeated Little Guido (with J.T. Smith)	Singles match	6:21
6	2 Cold Scorpio and the Sandman (with Missy Hyatt) defeated the Bruise Brothers (Don Bruise and Ron Bruise)	Tag team match	8:25
7	Brian Lee defeated Tommy Dreamer	Singles match	6:49
8	Sabu defeated Rob Van Dam	Singles match	18:57
9	Raven (c) (with Stevie Richards and the Blue Meanie) defeated Shane Douglas (with Kimona Wanalaya)	Singles match for the ECW World Heavyweight Championship	16:40
(c) / – the champion(s) heading into the match
