= Re-enter the Sandman =

1999 Extreme Championship Wrestling live event

- The ECW Arena
- Promotion: Extreme Championship Wrestling
- Date: October 23, 1999 (aired October 29, November 5, and November 19, 1999)
- City: Philadelphia, Pennsylvania, US
- Venue: ECW Arena
- Attendance: c.1,500

Event chronology
← Previous; The Last Show at the Madhouse	Next → Wrestlepalooza

Re-enter the Sandman was a professional wrestling live event produced by Extreme Championship Wrestling (ECW) on October 23, 1999. The event was held in the ECW Arena in Philadelphia, Pennsylvania in the United States. Excerpts from Re-enter the Sandman aired on episode #11 of the television show ECW on TNN on The Nashville Network on November 5, 1999, as well as on episodes #340, #331, and #343 of the syndicated television show ECW Hardcore TV on October 29, November 5, and November 19, 1999. A "fan cam" recording of the event was later released by the Highspots Network.

Re-enter the Sandman marked the return of the Sandman and Mikey Whipwreck to ECW, as well as the debut of Elektra and the final appearance of Angelica.

== Event ==
The Sandman returned to ECW at Re-enter the Sandman.

The event was attended by approximately 1,500 people. The commentators for the event were Joey Styles and Joel Gertner.

The event began with Joey Styles interviewing Sign Guy Dudley. Dudley gave a promo in which he claimed to be the greatest manager in professional wrestling, then renamed himself "Lou E. Dangerously" (a reference to Paul E. Dangerously). Dangerously then introduced the returning Mikey Whipwreck.

The opening bout saw ECW World Heavyweight Champion Mike Awesome defend his title against Mikey Whipwreck. Awesome defeated Whipwreck by pinfall using a frog splash.

The second bout was a singles match between Chris Candido and Nova. During the match, Chris Chetti came to ringside, kissing Candido's valet Tammy Lynn Sytch before carrying her backstage. Nova went on to defeat Candido by pinfall following a Kryptonite Krunch.

Following the second bout, Danny Doring, Roadkill, and Doring's girlfriend Miss Congeniality were confronted in the ring by Cyrus, who offered to trade the debuting Elektra for Miss Congeniality. After Doring told Miss Congeniality that he had no intention of marrying her and that he had cheated on her, Miss Congeniality slapped him, prompting Doring to give her a double arm DDT and Roadkill to give her a diving splash. Miss Congeniality was then stretchered out of the ring; this marked her final appearance with ECW, with Elektra replacing her as Doring and Roadkill's valet.

The third bout was a three way dance between Little Guido, Spike Dudley, and Super Crazy. Dudley was the first competitor eliminated when Little Guido pinned him following a Sicilian Drop. Super Crazy went on to pin Little Guido to win the match using a sitout powerbomb.

Following the third bout, Simon Diamond gave an innuendo-laden promo in which he introduced the debuting "Dick Hertz" as his new bodyguard. As Diamond spoke, Jazz came to the ring and attacked him, giving him a Jazz Stinger before attempting to pin him. The pinfall attempt was broken by Hertz, who gave Jazz a Michinoku Driver, resulting in her being stretchered from the ring.

The fourth bout was a singles match between Jerry Lynn and Yoshihiro Tajiri. Following interference from Tajiri's allies Jack Victory and Steve Corino, Tajiri blew red mist in Lynn's eyes, then gave him a brainbuster and pinned him.

The fifth bout was a singles match between David Cash and Tom Marquez. The bout ended in a no contest when Da Baldies (Angel, DeVito, and Vito LoGrasso) attacked both men, then called out the Hardcore Chair Swingin' Freaks (Axl Rotten and Balls Mahoney). After the Hardcore Chair Swingin' Freaks beat down Da Baldies, P. N. News came to the ring and attacked both men. P. N. News and Da Baldies then beat down the Hardcore Chair Swingin' Freaks, drawing out New Jack, who was also beaten down, with Angel using a staple gun on his eye.

The sixth bout saw ECW World Television Champion Rob Van Dam defend his title against Sabu, with Bill Alfonso accompanying both men to ringside. The match ended in a time limit draw. Following the match, Sabu refused to shake Van Dam's hand, mirroring Van Dam's refusal to shake Sabu's hand after their bout at Hostile City Showdown in 1996.

The main event saw ECW World Tag Team Champions Raven and Tommy Dreamer defend their titles against the Impact Players. During the match, Dreamer and Raven repeatedly failed to cooperate, eventually brawling with one another. Rhino went on to interfere in the match, attacking Dreamer. The three men attacked Dreamer and Raven until the Sandman made his surprise return to ECW, driving the Impact Players and Rhino away before celebrating with Dreamer and Francine.

== Results ==
No.	Results	Stipulations	Times
1	Mike Awesome (c) (with Jeff Jones) defeated Mikey Whipwreck (with Lou E. Dangerously) by pinfall	Singles match for the ECW World Heavyweight Championship	5:55
2	Nova defeated Chris Candido (with Tammy Lynn Sytch) by pinfall	Singles match	—
3	Super Crazy defeated Little Guido (with Sal E. Graziano) and Spike Dudley by pinfall	Three way dance	10:57
4	Yoshihiro Tajiri (with Jack Victory and Steve Corino) defeated Jerry Lynn by pinfall	Singles match	—
5	David Cash vs. Tom Marquez ended in a no contest	Singles match	—
6	Rob Van Dam (c) (with Bill Alfonso) vs. Sabu (with Bill Alfonso) ended in a no contest	Singles match for the ECW World Television Championship	30:00
7	Raven and Tommy Dreamer (c) (with Francine) vs. The Impact Players (Justin Credible and Lance Storm) (with Dawn Marie and Jason) ended in a no contest	Tag team match for the ECW World Tag Team Championship	4:45
(c) / – the champion(s) heading into the match
