= Hostile City Showdown (1997) =

1997 Extreme Championship Wrestling supercard event

- The ECW Arena.
- Promotion: Extreme Championship Wrestling
- Date: March 15, 1997 (aired March 22 and March 29, 1997)
- City: Philadelphia, Pennsylvania, US
- Venue: ECW Arena
- Attendance: 1,075

Event chronology
| ← Previous; Mountain Top Madness | Next → Chapter 2 |

Hostile City Showdown chronology
| ← Previous; 1996 | Next → 1998 |

Hostile City Showdown, the fourth Hostile City Showdown professional wrestling supercard produced by Extreme Championship Wrestling (ECW), took place on March 15, 1997 in the ECW Arena in Philadelphia, Pennsylvania in the United States. Exceprts from Hostile City Showdown aired on the syndicated television show ECW Hardcore TV on 22 and 29 March 1997.

== Event ==
Hostile City Showdown was attended by 1,075 people.

The opening bout was a tag team match pitting Chris Chetti and Tracy Smothers against the Full Blooded Italians. The Full Blooded Italians won the bout after Smothers turned on Chetti by giving him a spin kick, enabling Little Guido to pin Chetti. Following the match, Smothers joined the Full Blooded Italians.

The second bout was a singles match between Rob Van Dam and Taz. Taz won the match by submission using the Tazmission.

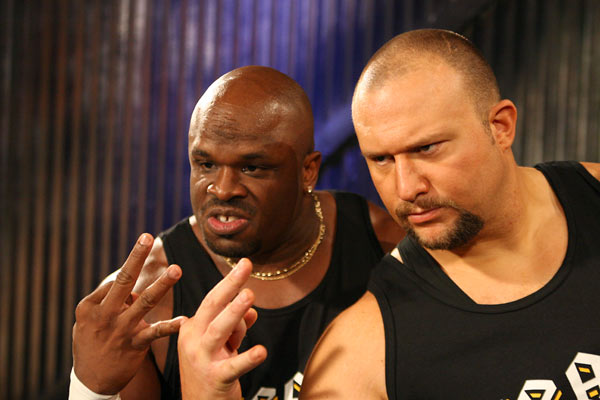
The Dudley Boyz won the ECW World Tag Team Championship for the first time at Hostile City Showdown.

The third bout was a singles match between Sabu and Spike Dudley. Sabu won the match by submission, using the Tazmission to mock his rival Taz. Following the match, Sabu called out Taz, who came to the ring and brawled with him until they were pulled apart.

The fourth bout was a two-out-of-three falls match pitting Chris Candido against Louie Spicolli. Spicolli won the first fall by pinning Candido using a roll-up. Candido won the second fall by hitting Spicolli with the ring bell then pinning him using a Frankensteiner. Candido went on to win the third fall by submission using a figure-four leglock, thereby winning the match.

The fifth bout saw ECW World Television Champion Shane Douglas defend his title against Pitbull #1 in an "I quit" match. During the match, Douglas said "I quit" while Pitbull #1 was applying a full nelson to him, but the referee was distracted by Douglas's valet Francine. Towards the end of the match, Douglas trapped Pitbull #1's neck between the ring ropes. After his tag team partner, Pitbull #2, came to the ring, Douglas and the other members of the Triple Threat gave him repeated chair shots until Pitbull #1 said "I quit" to save his partner. After the match, both of the Pitbulls were removed on stretchers. The masked Rick Rude then traded insults with Douglas, threatening to harm him at the upcoming Barely Legal pay-per-view.

The sixth bout was scheduled to be a singles match between Axl Rotten and Balls Mahoney, but the Sandman came to the ring and hit both men with his Singapore cane, then took Rotten's place in the match. The Sandman went on to win the match, pinning Mahoney following a DDT.

The seventh bout saw ECW World Tag Team Champions the Eliminators defend their titles against the Dudley Boyz. The Dudley Boyz defeated the Eliminators to become the ECW World Tag Team Champions for the first time, pinning John Kronus following a 3D.

The eighth bout was a singles match between Brian Lee and Terry Funk. The bout was won by Funk, who pinned Lee after giving him a DDT onto a trash can.

The main event was scheduled to be a tag team match pitting Stevie Richards and Tommy Dreamer against ECW World Heavyweight Champion Raven and a random partner to be determined via a raffle. After Stevie Richards' name was drawn in the raffle, ECW commissioner Tod Gordon changed the match to a three way dance with Raven's title on the line. Richards was the first competitor eliminated when Raven pinned him. Raven went on to pin Dreamer to win the bout, retaining his title.

== Results ==
| No. | Results | Stipulations |
|---|---|---|
| 1 | The Full Blooded Italians (Little Guido and Tommy Rich) defeated Chris Chetti and Tracy Smothers | Tag team match |
| 2 | Taz defeated Rob Van Dam by submission | Singles match |
| 3 | Sabu defeated Spike Dudley by submission | Singles match |
| 4 | Chris Candido defeated Louie Spicolli by submission | Two-out-of-three falls match |
| 5 | Shane Douglas (c) (with Francine) defeated Pitbull #1 | "I Quit" match for the ECW World Television Championship |
| 6 | The Sandman defeated Balls Mahoney by pinfall | Singles match |
| 7 | The Dudley Boyz (Buh Buh Ray Dudley and D-Von Dudley) (with Sign Guy Dudley) defeated the Eliminators (Kronus and Saturn) (c) by pinfall | Tag team match for the ECW World Tag Team Championship |
| 8 | Terry Funk defeated Brian Lee by pinfall | Singles match |
| 9 | Raven (c) defeated Stevie Richards and Tommy Dreamer by pinfall | Three way dance for the ECW World Heavyweight Championship |
(c) / – the champion(s) heading into the match
