= Hostile City Showdown (1999) =

1999 Extreme Championship Wrestling supercard event

- The ECW Arena.
- Promotion: Extreme Championship Wrestling
- Date: June 26, 1999 (aired July 10, 1999)
- City: Philadelphia, Pennsylvania, US
- Venue: ECW Arena
- Attendance: c. 1,600

Event chronology
← Previous; CyberSlam	Next → The Last Show at the Madhouse

Hostile City Showdown chronology
← Previous; 1998	Next → Final

Hostile City Showdown 1999 was the sixth and final Hostile City Showdown professional wrestling supercard event produced by Extreme Championship Wrestling (ECW). It took place on June 26, 1999 in the ECW Arena in Philadelphia, Pennsylvania in the United States. Excerpts from Hostile City Showdown aired on episode #324 of ECW Hardcore TV on July 10, 1999, while the bout between Christopher Daniels and Rhino aired on episode #336 of ECW Hardcore TV on October 2, 1999. The ECW World Heavyweight Championship bout between Taz and Yoshihiro Tajiri was included on the compilation DVD ECW Unreleased Vol. 3 released by WWE in 2015.

== Event ==
Yoshihiro Tajiri challenged for the ECW World Heavyweight Championship at Hostile City Showdown.

The event was attended by circa 1,600 people.

The opening bout was a singles match between Christopher Daniels and Rhino. Rhino won the bout by pinfall following a Rhino Bomb.

The second bout was a singles match between Rhino and Spike Dudley. Dudley won the bout by pinfall following a tornado DDT.

The third bout was a singles match between Lance Diamond and Skull Von Krush. Von Krush won the match by pinfall following a DDT.

The fourth bout was a tag team match pitting Chris Chetti and Nova against Danny Doring and Roadkill. Doring and Roadkill won by pinfall, with Roadkill pinning Nova following a frog splash.

Following the fourth bout, there was a bikini contest between Dawn Marie Bytch and Francine. After a "catfight" broke out between the two women, Dawn Marie Bytch's allies Justin Credible and Lance Storm came to the ring and attempted to hit Francine with their Singapore canes, but were driven away by Sabu and Jerry Lynn.

The fifth bout was a singles match between David Cash and El Mosco. El Mosco won the bout by pinfall following a diving leg drop.

The sixth bout was a singles match between Little Guido and Super Crazy. Little Guido won by pinfall after Yoshihiro Tajiri interfered, kicking Super Crazy. Following the match, Tajiri attacked both Little Guido and Super Crazy.

Following the sixth bout, ECW World Heavyweight Champion Taz came to the ring and offered Tajiri a title shot. Taz won the bout by submission using the Tazmission.

The eighth bout saw ECW World Television Champion Rob Van Dam defend his title against Balls Mahoney. The Dudley Boyz interfered in the match, powerbombing Mahoney through a burning table. Van Dam then drove the Dudley Boyz away and gave Mahoney a Five Star Frog Splash, then pinned him to retain his title.

The main event was a "non-sanctioned" tag team match pitting the Impact Players against Jerry Lynn and a partner of Lynn's choosing. Lynn chose Sabu - who at the time was banned from ECW - as his partner, arguing that as the match was non-sanctioned, Sabu's ban did not apply. The Impact Players won the bout after Justin Credible hit Lynn with a Singapore cane, enabling Lance Storm to give him a cradle piledriver then pin him.

== Results ==
No.	Results	Stipulations
1	Rhino (with Jack Victory and Steve Corino) defeated Christopher Daniels by pinfall	Singles match
2	Spike Dudley defeated Rhino by pinfall	Singles match
3	Skull Von Krush defeated Lance Diamond by pinfall	Singles match
4	Danny Doring and Roadkill (with Angelica) defeated Chris Chetti and Nova by pinfall	Tag team match
5	El Mosco defeated David Cash by pinfall	Singles match
6	Little Guido (with Sal E. Graziano) defeated Super Crazy by pinfall	Singles match
7	Taz (c) defeated Yoshihiro Tajiri by submission	Singles match for the ECW World Heavyweight Championship
8	Rob Van Dam (c) (with Bill Alfonso) defeated Balls Mahoney by pinfall	Singles match for the ECW World Television Championship
9	The Impact Players (Justin Credible and Lance Storm) (with Dawn Marie and Jason) defeated Jerry Lynn and Sabu (with Bill Alfonso) by pinfall	"Non-sanctioned" tag team match
(c) / – the champion(s) heading into the match
