= Hostile City Showdown (1994) =

1994 Eastern Championship Wrestling supercard event

- The ECW Arena.
- Promotion: Eastern Championship Wrestling
- Date: June 24, 1994
- City: Philadelphia, Pennsylvania, US
- Venue: ECW Arena
- Attendance: 1,000

Event chronology
← Previous; When Worlds Collide	Next → Heat Wave

Hostile City Showdown chronology
← Previous; First	Next → 1995

Hostile City Showdown (1994) was the first Hostile City Showdown professional wrestling event produced by Eastern Championship Wrestling (ECW). It took place on June 24, 1994 in the ECW Arena in Philadelphia, Pennsylvania in the United States.

The main event of Hostile City Showdown was a heavily promoted "dream match" between the hardcore wrestlers Cactus Jack and Sabu. Cactus Jack, an employee of World Championship Wrestling and then-WCW World Tag Team Champion, participated in the event as part of a talent exchange brokered between ECW and WCW by Todd Gordon and Kevin Sullivan. Cactus Jack suffered herniated discs during the match and subsequently developed hives over fifty percent of his body; he was briefly hospitalized.

The bout between Cactus Jack and Sabu appeared on the 2007 WWE DVD release Mick Foley: Greatest Hits & Misses, while the bout between Dory Funk Jr. and Terry Funk and the Public Enemy appeared on the 2007 compilation DVD The Most Powerful Families in Wrestling. In 2019, the event was added to the WWE Network.

== Storylines ==
The event featured wrestlers from pre-existing scripted feuds and storylines. Wrestlers portrayed villains, heroes, or less distinguishable characters in the scripted events that built tension and culminated in a wrestling match or series of matches played out on ECW's television program Hardcore TV.

At When Worlds Collide, Sabu and Bobby Eaton defeated Terry Funk and Arn Anderson after Sabu's manager Paul E. Dangerously paid off The Public Enemy, who interfered in the match and attacked Funk and then Anderson turned on Funk. On the May 17 episode of Hardcore TV, Funk cut a promo, in which he announced that he would call out his brother Dory Funk, Jr. to gain revenge on Public Enemy. Later that night, it was announced that Public Enemy would face the Funk Brothers at Hostile City Showdown.

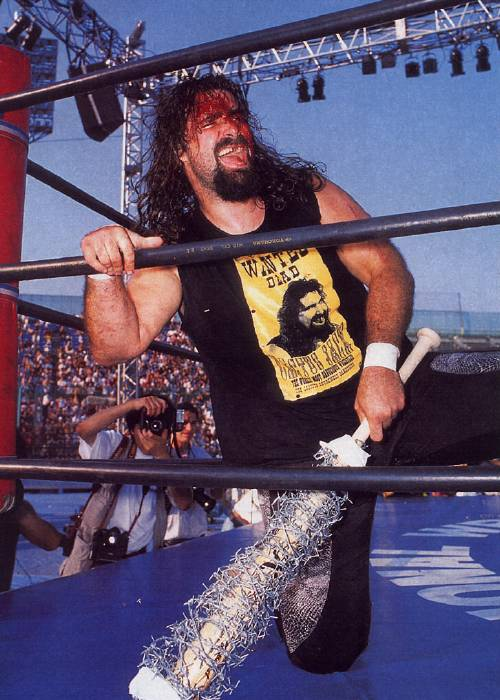
The event featured the ECW debut of then-WCW employee Cactus Jack in the main event.

On the May 31 episode of Hardcore TV, Paul E. Dangerously proclaimed that Sabu would face Atsushi Onita from Frontier Martial-Arts Wrestling in a major main event at Hostile City Showdown until someone informed Dangerously that Sabu's opponent would not be Onita. Later that night, it was revealed that Sabu would face World Championship Wrestling's Cactus Jack at the event.

At When Worlds Collide, The Pitbull defeated The Tazmaniac by using a dog collar chain. On the May 17 episode of Hardcore TV, Tazmaniac cost Pitbull, the ECW Television Championship against Mikey Whipwreck. On the May 31 episode of Hardcore TV, it was announced that Tazmaniac would face Pitbull in a dog collar match at Hostile City Showdown.

On the June 21 episode of Hardcore TV, it was announced that Mikey Whipwreck would defend the Television Championship against Rockin' Rebel, who proclaimed that he would hit just a clothesline to win the title. Rebel interfered in Whipwreck's title defense against The Pitbull and joined Pitbull and Jason in attacking him.

At When Worlds Collide, J.T. Smith and The Bruise Brothers defeated Shane Douglas, Mr. Hughes and The Public Enemy in a handicap elimination match, during which Douglas, Hughes and Bruise Brothers were eliminated by brawling against one another. On the May 24 episode of Hardcore TV, Hughes, Douglas and Public Enemy took on the team of Terry Funk, Tommy Dreamer and Bruise Brothers in an eight-man tag team match, which ended in a no contest after interference by J.T. Smith. The following week, on Hardcore TV, it was announced that Hughes and Douglas would take on Bruise Brothers at Hostile City Showdown.

At When Worlds Collide, Tommy Cairo and Peaches defeated The Sandman and Woman in a Singapore cane match. After the match, Sandman and Woman hit Cairo and Peaches with cane several times. On the May 17 episode of Hardcore TV, Sandman attacked Cairo during a promo with his cane and told him to pay his bills of $100 otherwise he would have to pay with his blood and preferred Woman to be better than Peaches. The following week, Sandman reduced the bill to $75. Later on the show, it was announced that Cairo would face Sandman in a Singapore Cane on a Pole match. On the May 31 Hardcore TV, Sandman attacked Cairo with the cane after Cairo defeated Rockin' Rebel. On the June 14 Hardcore TV, Cairo defeated Sandman in a falls count anywhere match. However, after the match, Sandman hit him with the cane making him bleed.

== Event ==
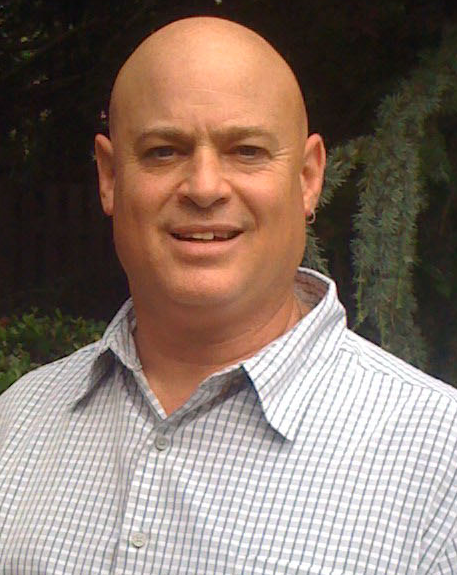
Tommy Cairo engaged in a lengthy feud with The Sandman throughout the year.

The opening bout was a singles match between Tommy Dreamer and Hack Meyers. Dreamer whipped Meyers into the corner and hit a diving splash for the win.

The second bout saw Chad Austin take on Don E. Allen. 911 interfered before the match even began and chokeslammed the referee and then proceeded to chokeslam both wrestlers. Tod Gordon came and shoved Paul E. Dangerously to the mat, leading to 911 hitting two chokeslams to Gordon. Dreamer came to the rescue of Gordon and confronted 911, who hit a chokeslam to Dreamer as well.

Other on-screen personnel
Role:	Name:
Commentator	Joey Styles
Ring announcer	Bob Artese
Referees	Jim Molineaux
Referees	John Finnegan

The third bout saw The Tazmaniac take on The Pitbull in a Dog Collar match. Jason and Pitbull attacked Tazmaniac with the dog collar before the match, which allowed Pitbull to gain advantage over his opponent. Tazmaniac touched the four corners and then hit a half nelson suplex to Pitbull for the win. After the match, Pitbull #2 made his ECW debut by attacking Taz and then both Pitbulls hanged him with the chain.

In the fourth bout, Shane Douglas and Mr. Hughes took on The Bruise Brothers (Don Bruise and Ron Bruise). Hughes hit a side slam but the referee was knocked out, allowing Bruise Brothers to gain advantage and pin Hughes for the win.

In the fifth bout, Tommy Cairo took on The Sandman in a Singapore Cane on a Pole match. A cane was tied over the pole and a wrestler needed to retrieve the cane for the win. Woman handed over a second cane to Sandman, who hit Cairo with it, thus getting disqualified. Sandman continued to hit Cairo with the cane until Peaches made the rescue and covered him and Woman nailed Peaches with cane shots.

The sixth bout was a tag team match pitting Dory Funk, Jr. and Terry Funk against The Public Enemy (Johnny Grunge and Rocco Rock). Public Enemy began using chairs on the Funks and a brawl occurred between the two teams, thus ending the match in a no contest. After the match, 911 hit a chokeslam to the referee and joined Public Enemy in assaulting Funks. The two teams then reached the top of Eagle's Nest, where Terry Funk tied up Rocco Rock's legs and shoved him off the Eagle's Nest.

In the seventh bout, Mikey Whipwreck defended the ECW Television Championship against Rockin' Rebel. Rebel attacked Whipwreck before the match began and continued to use a series of moves. Whipwreck finally gained momentum by being sent from Rebel through the ropes and hitting a flying clothesline to Jason from the apron to outside the ring. Jason handed a chair to Rebel and Rebel attempted to use it, thus getting disqualified. Rebel grabbed Whipwreck and Jason attempted to hit him but Whipwreck sidestepped it and Rebel was hit with it. However, Jason and Rebel double teamed Whipwreck until Tazmaniac made the save and attacked both men and then Pitbulls attacked Tazmaniac.

Sabu faced Cactus Jack in the main event. Paul E. Dangerously whacked Jack with his cellphone and Sabu pinned him for the win. After the match, 911 came to attack Jack but Jack hit him in the head with a steel chair. Mr. Hughes came to attack Jack but was held back by Shane Douglas and Bruise Brothers came to attack the two. Sabu then dived onto all of them and then Jack and Sabu continued to brawl with each other. Sabu placed Jack on a table and landed a moonsault but Jack suplexed him through the table.

== Aftermath ==
Several feuds continued after Hostile City Showdown leading to the next event Heat Wave. On the June 28 episode of Hardcore TV, it was announced that Public Enemy would face Terry Funk and Dory Funk, Jr. in a barbed wire match at Heat Wave.

On June 28 episode of Hardcore TV, it was announced that Tommy Cairo would face The Sandman in a Dueling Canes match at Heat Wave.

The debut of Pitbull #2 and assault on The Tazmaniac at Hostile City Showdown resulted in a feud between Tazmaniac and The Pitbulls. On the July 5 episode of Hardcore TV, it was announced that Tazmaniac and a mystery tag team partner would face Pitbulls at Heat Wave.

== Results ==
No.	Results	Stipulations	Times
1	Tommy Dreamer defeated Hack Myers	Singles match	6:49
2	Chad Austin vs. Don E. Allen ended in a no contest	Singles match	—
3	The Tazmaniac defeated The Pitbull	Dog Collar match	7:37
4	The Bruise Brothers (Don Bruise and Ron Bruise) defeated Mr. Hughes and Shane Douglas by pinfall	Tag team match	18:38
5	Tommy Cairo (with Peaches) defeated The Sandman (with Woman) by disqualification	Singapore Cane on a Pole match	—
6	Dory Funk Jr. and Terry Funk vs. The Public Enemy (Johnny Grunge and Rocco Rock) ended in a no contest	Tag team match	13:24
7	Mikey Whipwreck (c) defeated Rockin' Rebel (with Jason) by disqualification	Singles match for the ECW Television Championship	3:24
8	Sabu (with Paul E. Dangerously and 911) defeated Cactus Jack by pinfall	Singles match	13:00
(c) / – the champion(s) heading into the match
