= Heatwave '94: the Battle for the Future =

1994 Eastern Championship Wrestling supercard event

- The ECW Arena
- Promotion: Eastern Championship Wrestling
- Date: July 16, 1994
- City: Philadelphia, Pennsylvania, United States
- Venue: ECW Arena
- Attendance: 850
- Tagline: The Battle for the Future

Event chronology
← Previous; Hostile City Showdown	Next → Hardcore Heaven

Heat Wave chronology
← Previous; First	Next → 1995

Heatwave '94: the Battle for the Future was the first Heatwave professional wrestling event produced by Eastern Championship Wrestling (ECW). It took place on July 16, 1994 in the ECW Arena in Philadelphia, Pennsylvania in the United States.

== Storylines ==
The event featured wrestlers from pre-existing scripted feuds and storylines. Wrestlers portrayed villains, heroes, or less distinguishable characters in the scripted events that built tension and culminated in a wrestling match or series of matches played out on ECW's television program Hardcore TV.

At Hostile City Showdown, Sabu defeated Cactus Jack in the main event. On the June 28 episode of Hardcore TV, it was announced that Shane Douglas would defend the ECW Heavyweight Championship against Sabu at Heat Wave. Douglas mocked Sabu over the following weeks until the two brawled with each other on the July 12 episode of Hardcore TV.

At Hostile City Showdown, Terry Funk and Dory Funk, Jr. defeated The Public Enemy (Rocco Rock and Johnny Grunge) by disqualification after 911 chokeslammed the referee. Terry hanged Rock by the neck in the eagle's nest. On the June 28 episode of Hardcore TV, it was announced that Public Enemy would compete against the Funks in a barbed wire match at Heat Wave. On the July 12 episode of Hardcore TV, Tommy Dreamer and the Funks defeated Hack Meyers and Public Enemy in a six-man tag team match.

At Hostile City Showdown, The Tazmaniac defeated Pitbull #1 in a dog collar match and then Pitbull #2 made his ECW debut and attacked Tazmaniac. Later that night, Mikey Whipwreck defended the ECW Television Championship against Rockin' Rebel by disqualification after Rebel hit Whipwreck with a chair and then Tazmaniac rescued Whipwreck from an assault by Rebel and Jason until Pitbulls attacked Tazmaniac. On the July 5 episode of Hardcore TV, it was announced that Tazmaniac and a mystery tag team partner would take on the newly formed team The Pitbulls at Heat Wave. Later that night, Whipwreck defended the Television Championship against Pitbull #2, during which Whipwreck retained the title by disqualification after Pitbull #1 and Jason attacked Whipwreck. The trio continued to attack Whipwreck until Tazmaniac attempted to make the save but he was outnumbered. The following week on Hardcore TV, Tazmaniac defeated Jimmy Snuka and then Pitbulls attacked Tazmaniac but Tazmaniac cleared the ring of Pitbulls and Hack Meyers.

Tommy Cairo and The Sandman had been feuding with each other since the February 15 episode of Hardcore TV when Rockin' Rebel blinded Sandman with a liquid and Sandman accidentally struck his wife Peaches and then Cairo saved her and carried her to the backstage. This ignited their rivalry and they fought each other in several matches throughout the year. At Hostile City Showdown, Cairo and Sandman fought each other to a no contest in a Singapore Cane on a Pole match after the Singapore cane fell down from the pole on the mat. Woman handed over the cane to Sandman and then Sandman and Woman assaulted Cairo and Peaches with cane. On the June 28 episode of Hardcore TV, it was announced that Cairo would face Sandman in a Dueling canes match at Heat Wave. The following week on Hardcore TV, Sandman attacked Cairo before Cairo's match against 911, leaving Cairo vulnerable to an easy defeat.

On the July 5 episode of Hardcore TV, it was announced that Mikey Whipwreck would defend the ECW Television Championship against Chad Austin at Heat Wave.

== Event ==
In the opening match, the Bad Breed (Axl Rotten and Ian Rotten) took on Hack Meyers and Rockin' Rebel. Axl hit an atomic drop to Myers followed by Ian executing a diving bulldog to Myers. After the match, Rebel shoved Myers and then hit him with a clothesline.

In the second bout, Mikey Whipwreck defended the ECW Television Championship against Chad Austin. Jason dropped Whipwreck onto the table and then Austin hit a slingshot suplex and a diving leg drop to win the title. After initially winning the title, Austin informed the referee that he had used brass knuckles to win the match, causing the referee to reverse the decision. As a result, Whipwreck retained the title. After the match, Jason and Austin attacked Whipwreck and Jason executed a Piledriver to Whipwreck on the Television Championship title belt.

In the third bout, Tommy Dreamer took on Stevie Richards in the following match. Richards initially provoked Dreamer by shaking hands and then attacked him. Dreamer gained control and applied a sleeper hold on Richards to make him pass out to the hold for the win. After the match, Dreamer demanded a shot at Shane Douglas' ECW Heavyweight Championship and Douglas came out to confront Dreamer until Mr. Hughes held him back.

The fourth bout saw Mr. Hughes face Tommy Dreamer. The match ended when Shane Douglas struck Dreamer with a steel chair and Hughes hit a spinning side slam to win the match.

In the fifth bout, the Tazmaniac was scheduled to team with his mystery partner as he took on the Pitbulls (Pitbull #1 and Pitbull #2). Before the match, Pitbulls attacked Tazmaniac with their dog collar chains repeatedly and then Mr. Hughes, Rockin' Rebel and Chad Austin interrupted until 911 made the rescue by brawling with Hughes, Rebel and Austin until Hughes attacked 911 from behind with a chair. Sabu then hit everyone with a steel chair and then rescued Tazmaniac from Pitbulls and became his mystery partner. Taz hit a half nelson suplex on Pitbull #1 to win the match.

In the sixth bout, Tommy Cairo took on The Sandman in a Dueling Canes match. Both men were knocked out by hitting each other with canes and then Sandman's wife Peaches accidentally knocked out the referee with a cane. Sandman sent her out of the ring and knocked Cairo with the cane in the head for the win.

In the seventh bout, Shane Douglas defended the Heavyweight Championship against Sabu. 911 and Mr. Hughes showed up at ringside to argue with each other. 911 placed a table outside the ring and then Sabu placed Douglas on the table and attempted a springboard moonsault on Douglas but he moved out of the table and then Sabu crashed through the table and got counted out. After the match, 911 chokeslammed everyone including the referee, Hughes and Douglas. Angel then hit 911 with a chair and 911 retaliated by chokeslamming her.

In the main event bout, brothers Dory Funk Jr. and Terry Funk took on the Public Enemy (Johnny Grunge and Rocco Rock) in a barbed wire match. After brawling with each other through the barbed wire, Terry's head was wrapped in the barbed wire and then the Public Enemy placed a trashcan on Funk and pinned him to win the match.

== Reception ==
Crazy Max staff praised the event and considered it a much better show which exceeded expectations, with "All three title matches were good. The Heavyweight being my favorite of the three as well as favorite match of the night. Just about everything else was watchable. 911 and Sabu were over huge. This show is worth checking out."

== Aftermath ==
On the July 19 episode of Hardcore TV, Woman caned Mikey Whipwreck during Whipwreck's ECW Television Championship title defence against The Sandman. Tommy Dreamer ultimately made the save and then Woman tried to hit him with the cane but he ducked it and kissed her, which angered Sandman as he lashed him with the cane fifty-seven times, weakening him enough to lose in his ECW Heavyweight Championship opportunity against Shane Douglas later that night. The following week on Hardcore TV, a match was made between the two at Hardcore Heaven. On the August 9 Hardcore TV, it was announced that their match would be a Singapore Cane match.

Tazmaniac's feud with Pitbulls continued after Heat Wave when Tazmaniac rescued Jimmy Snuka from an attack by Pitbulls on the July 26 episode of Hardcore TV after Snuka's manager Hunter Q. Robbins III berated him for being pinned by Tommy Dreamer in a match against Dreamer, Terry Funk and Dory Funk, Jr. A match was made between the team of Tazmaniac and Snuka against the Pitbulls at Hardcore Heaven.

Rockin' Rebel's attack on Hack Meyers at Heat Wave resulted in a feud between the two which turned Meyers into a face. On the July 26 episode of Hardcore TV, a match was made between the two for Hardcore Heaven.

911's multiple Chokeslams on Mr. Hughes, Shane Douglas and Angel ignited a feud between 911 and Hughes. A match was made between the two for Hardcore Heaven on the July 26 episode of Hardcore TV.

== Results ==
No.	Results	Stipulations	Times
1	The Bad Breed (Axl Rotten and Ian Rotten) defeated Hack Meyers and Rockin' Rebel by pinfall	Tag team match	9:40
2	Mikey Whipwreck (c) defeated Chad Austin (with Jason) by disqualification	Singles match for the ECW Television Championship	9:10
3	Tommy Dreamer defeated Stevie Richards (with Angel) by pinfall	Singles match	7:45
4	Mr. Hughes defeated Tommy Dreamer by pinfall	Singles match	3:00
5	Sabu and the Tazmaniac defeated the Pitbulls (Pitbull #1 and Pitbull #2) (with Jason) by pinfall	Tag team match	5:23
6	The Sandman (with Woman) defeated Tommy Cairo (with Peaches) by pinfall	Dueling canes match	8:48
7	Shane Douglas (c) (with Angel and Mr. Hughes) defeated Sabu (with 911 and Paul E. Dangerously) by count out	Singles match for the ECW Heavyweight Championship	19:38
8	The Public Enemy (Johnny Grunge and Rocco Rock) defeated Dory Funk Jr. and Terry Funk by pinfall	Barbed wire match	11:51
(c) / – the champion(s) heading into the match

== See also ==
- 1994 in professional wrestling
