= The Last Show at the Madhouse =

1999 Extreme Championship Wrestling live event

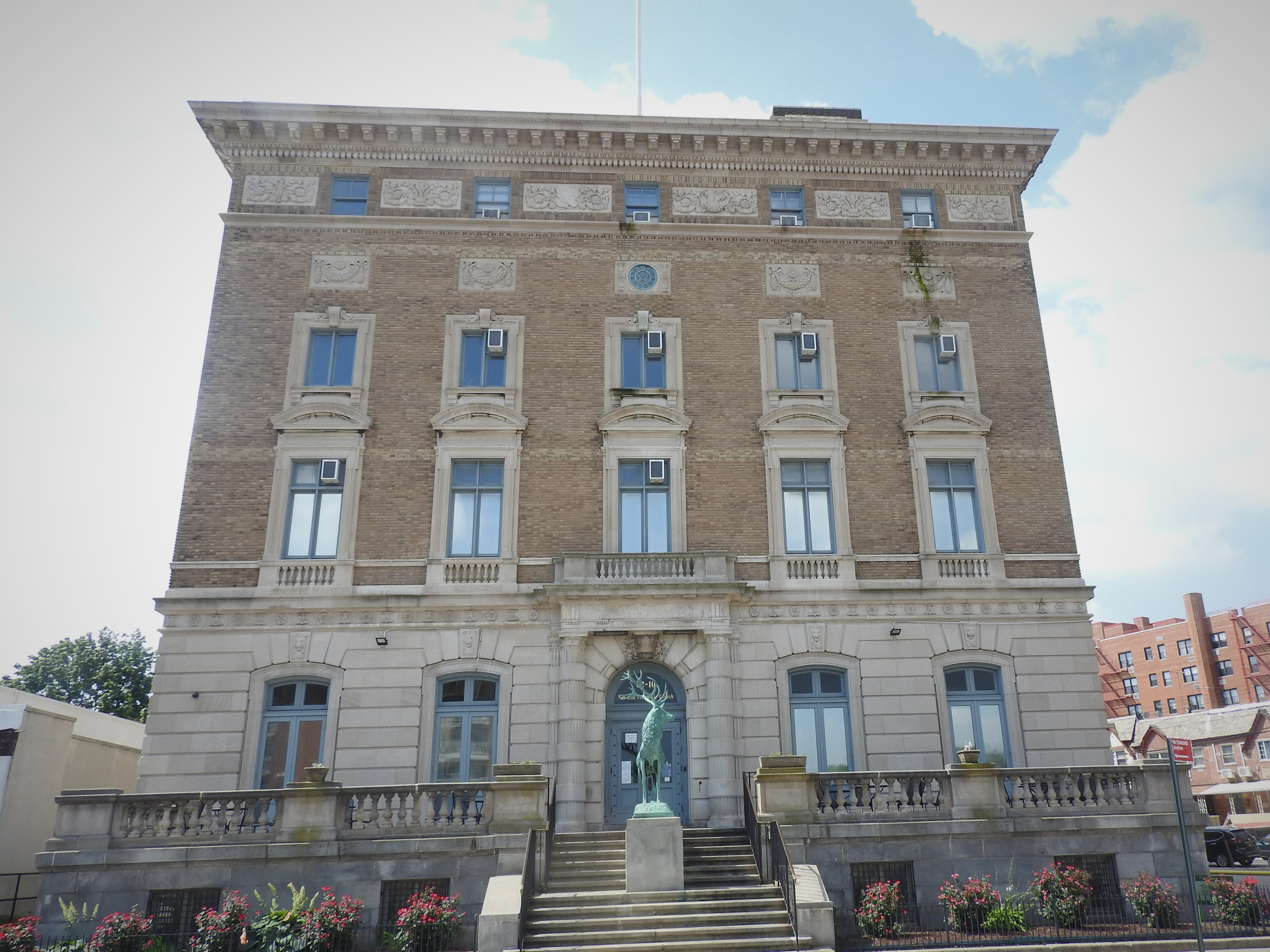
- Elks Lodge #878 in Queens
- Promotion: Extreme Championship Wrestling
- Date: August 26, 1999 (aired September 3 and 10, 1999)
- City: New York City, New York, US
- Venue: Elks Lodge #878
- Attendance: c.1,000

Event chronology
← Previous; Hostile City Showdown	Next → Re-enter the Sandman

The Last Show at the Madhouse was a professional wrestling live event produced by Extreme Championship Wrestling (ECW) on August 26, 1999. The event was held in Elks Lodge #878 in New York City, New York in the United States. Excerpts from the Last Show at the Madhouse aired on the television show ECW on TNN on The Nashville Network on September 3 and 10, 1999. A "fan cam" recording of the event was released on DVD by RF Video.

The Last Show at the Madhouse marked the return of Raven to ECW, as well as the final appearance of the Dudley Boyz with ECW before leaving to join the World Wrestling Federation (which in turned marked the dissolution of the long-running Dudley Brothers stable).

== Event ==
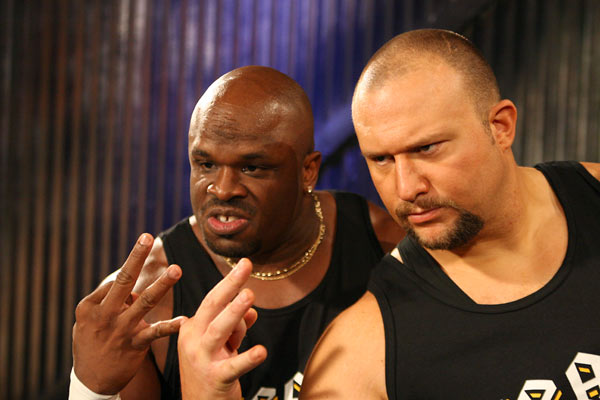
The Dudley Boyz made their final appearance in ECW at the Last Show at the Madhouse.

The event was attended by approximately 1,000 people. The commentators for the event were Joey Styles and Joel Gertner.

The opening bout saw ECW World Heavyweight Champion Taz defend his title against Yoshihiro Tajiri. Taz defeated Tajiri via submission using the Tazmission to retain his title.

The second bout was a singles match between C. W. Anderson and Danny Doring. The match was won by Doring.

The third bout was a singles match between Uganda and Vito LoGrasso. The match was won by Uganda.

The fourth bout was a singles match between Rhino and Super Crazy. The match was won by Super Crazy, who pinned Rhino by reversing a powerbomb into a hurricanrana.

The fifth bout was a three way dance between Chris Chetti and Nova, the Full Blooded Italians, and Simon Diamond and Tony DeVito. The match was won by Chetti and Nova.

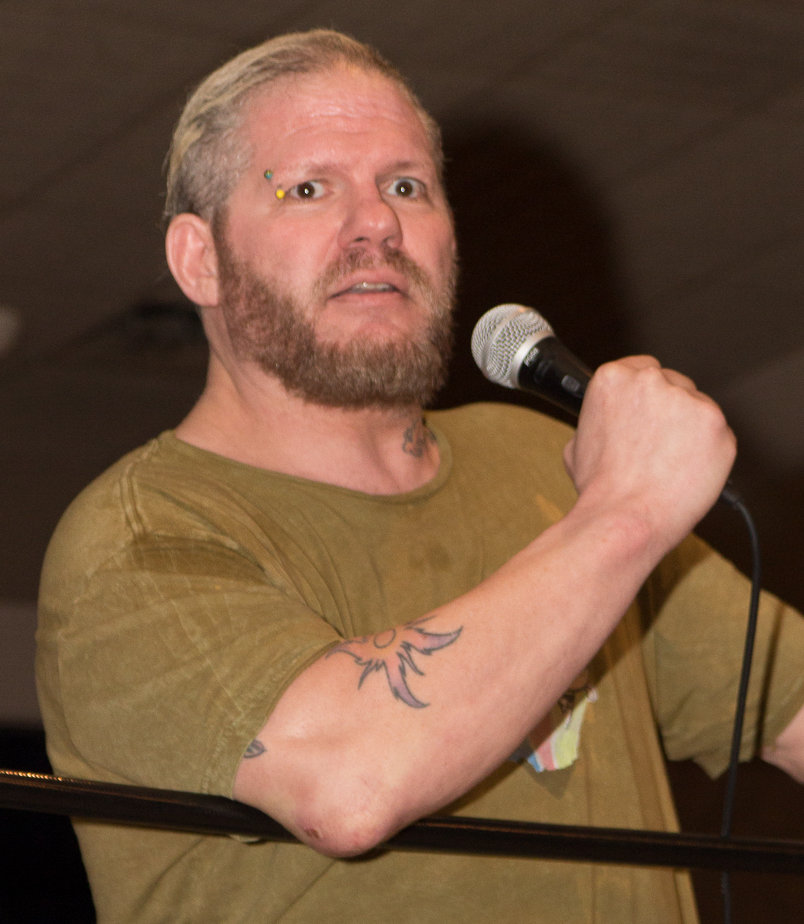
Raven returned to ECW at the Last Show at the Madhouse.

Following the fifth bout, the Dudley Boyz came to the ring and gave a promo in which they stated they were leaving ECW before issuing a challenge to ECW World Tag Team Champions Balls Mahoney and Spike Dudley. The Dudley Boyz went on to defeat Dudley and Mahoney to win the titles, pinning Dudley following a 3D. The Dudley Boyz then left the ring to a standing ovation, with commentator Joey Styles speculating that they would take the titles to the World Wrestling Federation and throw them away on an episode of Raw.

The seventh bout saw ECW World Television Champion Rob Van Dam defend his title against Jerry Lynn. The match ended in a no contest when the Impact Players interfered, attacking both men.

Following the seventh bout, new ECW World Tag Team Champions the Dudley Boyz came to the ring and gave another promo in which they derided ECW and claimed they would hand the titles to WWF chairman Vince McMahon. The Dudley Boyz then called out Tommy Dreamer, insulting him, ECW, and his valets Beulah McGillicutty and Francine. This resulted in an impromptu match pitting Dreamer against the Dudley Boyz. As the Dudley Boyz attempted to give Dreamer a 3D, he reversed the move into a DDT onto D-Von Dudley. As he did, his old nemesis Raven - who had been absent from ECW since losing a loser leaves town match to Dreamer in June 1997 - entered the ring and DDT'd Buh Buh Ray Dudley. Dreamer and Raven then simultaneously pinned both of the Dudley Boyz to become the new ECW World Tag Team Champions. Following the bout, a confused and dazed Dreamer was handed one of the title belts by Raven. Raven left through the crowd and the show ended with Dreamer not knowing what to make of what had just happened.

== Results ==
No.	Results	Stipulations	Times
1	Taz (c) defeated Yoshihiro Tajiri (with Jack Victory and Steve Corino) via submission	Singles match for the ECW World Heavyweight Championship	4:18
2	Danny Doring defeated C. W. Anderson	Singles match	—
3	Uganda defeated Vito LoGrasso by pinfall	Singles match	—
4	Super Crazy defeated Rhino by pinfall	Singles match	4:56
5	Chris Chetti and Nova defeated The Full Blooded Italians (Little Guido and Sal E. Graziano) and Simon Diamond and Tony DeVito	Three way dance	—
6	The Dudley Boyz (Buh Buh Ray Dudley and D-Von Dudley) (with Sign Guy Dudley) defeated Balls Mahoney and Spike Dudley (c) by pinfall	Tag team match for the ECW World Tag Team Championship	5:22
7	Rob Van Dam (with Bill Alfonso) (c) vs. Jerry Lynn ended in a no contest	Singles match for the ECW Television Championship	11:01
8	Raven and Tommy Dreamer (with Francine) defeated the Dudley Boyz (Buh Buh Ray Dudley and D-Von Dudley) (c) (with Sign Guy Dudley) by pinfall	Tag team match for the ECW World Tag Team Championship	—
(c) / – the champion(s) heading into the match
