= Hostile City Showdown (1998) =

1998 Extreme Championship Wrestling supercard event

- The ECW Arena.
- Promotion: Extreme Championship Wrestling
- Date: January 31, 1998 (aired February 4, February 11, and February 18, 1998)
- City: Philadelphia, Pennsylvania, US
- Venue: ECW Arena
- Attendance: 1,250

Event chronology
← Previous; House Party	Next → CyberSlam

Hostile City Showdown chronology
← Previous; 1997	Next → 1999

Hostile City Showdown was the fifth Hostile City Showdown professional wrestling supercard produced by Extreme Championship Wrestling (ECW). It took place on January 31, 1998 in the ECW Arena in Philadelphia, Pennsylvania in the United States. Excerpts from Hostile City Showdown aired on the February 4, February 11, and February 18 episodes of the syndicated television show ECW Hardcore TV.

== Event ==
The event was attended by approximately 1,250 people.

The opening bout was a tag team match pitting Chris Chetti and Jerry Lynn against the Full Blooded Italians. Chetti and Lynn won the bout by pinfall when Tommy Rogers interfered, giving the Tomikaze to both of the Full Blooded Italians and enabling Chetti and Lynn to simultaneously pin them.

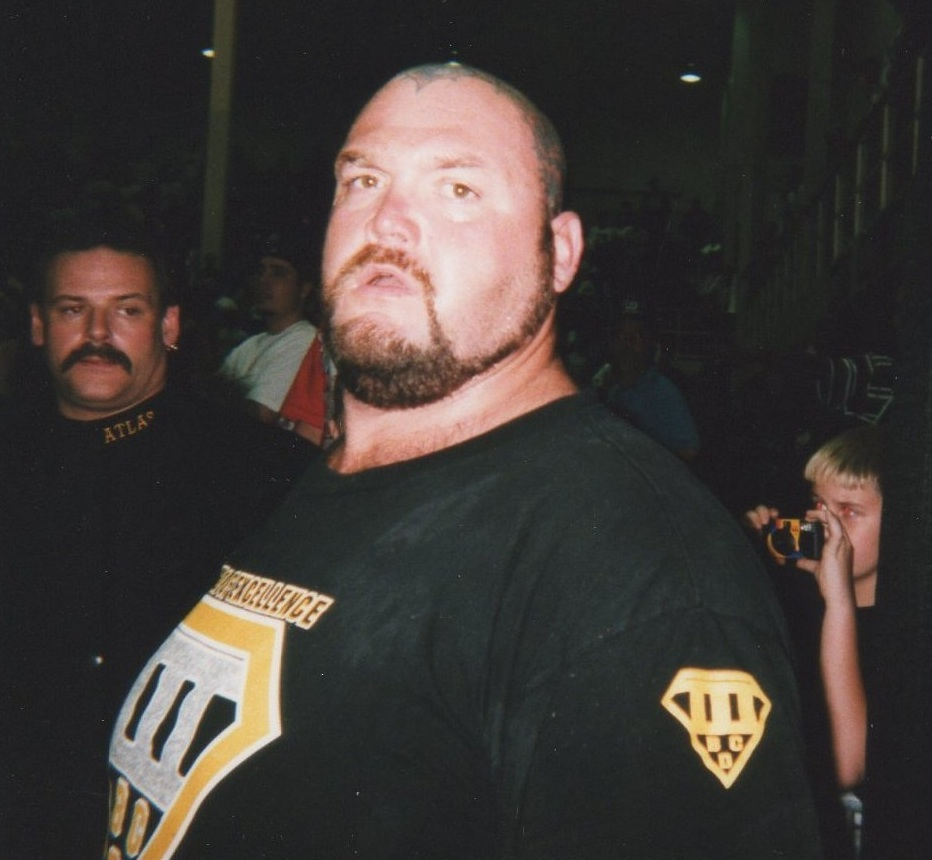
Bam Bam Bigelow turned on his ally Taz at Hostile City Showdown, re-joining the Triple Threat.

The second bout was a tag team match pitting the Hardcore Chair Swingin' Freaks against Rob Van Dam and Sabu. Van Dam and Sabu won the bout by disqualification when John Kronus attacked them after they performed his signature move, Total Elimination, on Balls Mahoney.

The third bout was a singles match between Gran Naniwa and Spike Dudley. Dudley won the bout by pinfall following an Acid Drop.

The fourth bout was a singles match between Gran Hamada and Justin Credible. Credible won the bout by pinfall after giving Hamada That's Incredible!.

The fifth bout was a handicap match pitting Bam Bam Bigelow and Taz against the Triple Threat. At the time of the match, Taz was the ECW World Television Champion, while Shane Douglas was the ECW World Heavyweight Champion and Chris Candido and Lance Storm were the ECW World Tag Team Champions, marking the first time that all ECW titleholders were competing in the same match. The match ended in a no contest after Bigelow turned on Taz and Candido turned on Storm, with Bigelow taking Storm's place in The Triple Threat.

The sixth bout was a singles match between Al Snow and Doug Furnas. Snow won the match by pinfall following a Snow Plow.

The main event was a four way dance between the Dudley Boyz, the Gangstanators, Rob Van Dam and Sabu, and the Sandman and Tommy Dreamer. The Gangstanators were the first team eliminated when D-Von Dudley pinned John Kronus after he was driven through a table by Van Dam and Sabu. The Dudley Boyz were the second team eliminated when Dreamer and The Sandman pinned them simultaneously using roll-ups. Van Dam and Sabu went on to win the match when Sabu pinned the Sandman after leg dropping a chair onto his face.

At the end of the event, the Sandman gave a speech in which he paid tribute to Tommy Dreamer, whose grandfather had recently died. During a moment of silence for Dreamer's grandfather, Justin Credible came to the ring and insulted Dreamer and his grandfather, resulting in a brawl.

== Results ==
No.	Results	Stipulations	Times
1	Chris Chetti and Jerry Lynn defeated the Full Blooded Italians (Little Guido and Tracy Smothers) (with Tommy Rich) by pinfall	Tag team match	12:27
2	Rob Van Dam and Sabu defeated the Hardcore Chair Swingin' Freaks (Axl Rotten and Balls Mahoney) by disqualification	Tag team match	8:06
3	Spike Dudley defeated Gran Naniwa by pinfall	Singles match	9:15
4	Justin Credible (with Jason) defeated Gran Hamada by pinfall	Singles match	4:52
5	Bam Bam Bigelow and Taz vs. the Triple Threat (Chris Candido, Lance Storm, and Shane Douglas) ended in a no contest	Handicap match	—
6	Al Snow defeated Doug Furnas (with Lance Wright) by pinfall	Singles match	—
7	Rob Van Dam and Sabu defeated the Dudley Boyz (Buh Buh Ray Dudley and D-Von Dudley), the Gangstanators (Kronus and New Jack), and the Sandman and Tommy Dreamer by pinfall	Four way dance	—
