= Hostile City Showdown =

Extremely Championship Wrestling event series

- Promotions: Eastern/Extreme Championship Wrestling
- First event: Hostile City Showdown (1994)
- Last event: Hostile City Showdown (1999)

Hostile City Showdown was a professional wrestling supercard event produced by Extreme Championship Wrestling (ECW) annually from 1994 to 1999.

== Dates and venues ==
Event	Date	City	Venue	Main event
Hostile City Showdown (1994)	June 24, 1994	Philadelphia, Pennsylvania	ECW Arena	Sabu vs. Cactus Jack
Hostile City Showdown (1995)	April 15, 1995	Philadelphia, Pennsylvania	ECW Arena	Cactus Jack vs. Terry Funk
Hostile City Showdown (1996)	April 20, 1996	Philadelphia, Pennsylvania	ECW Arena	Raven (c) vs. Shane Douglas for the ECW World Heavyweight Championship
Hostile City Showdown (1997)	March 15, 1997	Philadelphia, Pennsylvania	ECW Arena	Raven (c) vs. Stevie Richards and Tommy Dreamer in a Three-Way Dance for the ECW World Heavyweight Championship
Hostile City Showdown (1998)	January 31, 1998	Philadelphia, Pennsylvania	ECW Arena	The Sandman and Tommy Dreamer vs. The Gangstanators (Kronus and New Jack) vs. The Dudley Boyz (Buh Buh Ray Dudley and D-Von Dudley) vs. Rob Van Dam and Sabu in a Four-Way Dance
Hostile City Showdown (1999)	June 26, 1999	Philadelphia, Pennsylvania	ECW Arena	Sabu and Jerry Lynn vs. The Impact Players (Justin Credible and Lance Storm)
(c) – refers to the champion(s) heading into the match
