= Anthony Durante =

American professional wrestler (1967-2003)

Personal information
- Born: July 26, 1967 Hammonton, New Jersey, U.S.
- Died: September 25, 2003 (aged 36) Westerly, Rhode Island, U.S.
- Cause of death: Fentanyl overdose

Professional wrestling career
- Ring name(s): Pitbull #2; Pitbull Rex; Mad Bull Buster; Skullduggery
- Billed height: 6 ft 4 in (1.93 m)
- Billed weight: 250 lb (110 kg; 18 st)
- Trained by: Larry Sharpe
- Debut: 1988
- Retired: 2002

Anthony Durante (July 26, 1967 – September 25, 2003) was an American professional wrestler best known under the ring name "Pitbull #2" as one half of the tag team The Pitbulls, with "Pitbull #1" Gary Wolfe. The team is best known for their time in Extreme Championship Wrestling (ECW), where the team was the promotion's World Tag Team Championship once. Apart from tag team competition, Durante also achieved success briefly as a singles competitor, challenging for the ECW World Heavyweight Championship on a few occasions while holding the ECW World Television Championship once.

== Early life ==
Durante grew up in Hammonton, New Jersey.

== Professional wrestling career ==
=== Early career ===
Durante got his start in the World Wrestling Federation (WWF), competing as an enhancement talent under his real name. In his first WWF match, Durante formed a tag team with Gary Wolfe on the March 4, 1989, episode of Superstars, losing to The Hart Foundation (Bret Hart and Jim Neidhart). Durante would face several WWF stars such as Rick Rude, The Honky Tonk Man and The Barbarian. Wolfe and Durante formed a tag team, initially called American Bulldogs and would later be renamed The Pitbulls and Mad Bull Busters. The team competed in many promotions including New Japan Pro-Wrestling (NJPW), South Atlantic Pro Wrestling and Tri-State Wrestling Alliance (TWA). Durante would compete under the ring name Pitbull Rex.

=== Eastern Championship Wrestling (1992) ===
The Pitbulls debuted in Eastern Championship Wrestling (ECW) at a live event on April 25, 1992, where Pitbull Rex participated in a battle royal with the winner earning an ECW Heavyweight Championship match. Later that night, Pitbulls defeated Jeff Royal and Johnny Hotbody in the main event of the show. The Pitbulls then engaged in a brief rivalry with The Super Destroyers before departing the company.

=== Catch Wrestling Association (1992–1994) ===
Pitbulls would separate as Durante joined the Austrian promotion Catch Wrestling Association (CWA), where he debuted at the 1992 Euro Catch Festival in Graz under the ring name Mad Bull Buster. In his debut match, Durante teamed with Larry Cameron to defeat the team of Mile Zrno and Steve Regal in a two out of three falls match to win the promotion's World Tag Team Championship. They successfully defended the titles against Zrno and Regal in a rematch on November 17. Durante and Cameron defeated Zrno and Derrick Dukes in their second title defense at December's Euro Catch Festival in Bremen. They retained the title against David Taylor and Mile Zrno in their third title defense at Clash of the Champions on July 3, 1993, before losing the titles to Taylor and Zrno in their fourth title defense on July 18, thus ending their year-long title reign at 372 days.

Cameron and Buster defeated Mile Zrno and David Taylor on October 24 to win their second CWA World Tag Team Championship. They successfully defended the titles against Robert Fasser and Ulf Herman on November 19. The title reign of Cameron and Buster tragically ended on December 13 when Cameron died during a match against Tony St. Clair due to a heart attack. As a result, the titles were vacated. Durante wrestled his last match in CWA on February 19, 1994, competing against Ulf Herman in a street fight, which Durante lost via disqualification.

=== Eastern / Extreme Championship Wrestling (1994–1997, 2000) ===
After quitting CWA, Durante returned to ECW, where he received the biggest exposure of his career. He made his televised debut in ECW as a villain at Hostile City Showdown by attacking The Tazmaniac after Tazmaniac defeated The Pitbull in a dog collar match. As a result, Durante reformed The Pitbulls with Gary Wolfe and began using the ring name "Pitbull #2". Durante made his in-ring debut on the July 5 episode of Hardcore TV, challenging Mikey Whipwreck for the ECW Television Championship. Durante was disqualified after his partner Pitbull #1 interfered in the match. Pitbulls began a rivalry with Tazmaniac as they lost to Tazmaniac and Sabu at Heat Wave. On the July 26 episode of Hardcore TV, Pitbulls attacked their tag team partner Jimmy Snuka after they lost a match to Tommy Dreamer, Terry Funk and Dory Funk, Jr. This led to Tazmaniac making the save, leading to a match between Pitbulls and the team of Snuka and Tazmaniac at Hardcore Heaven, which Pitbulls lost, thus ending the feud. Pitbulls defeated The Bad Breed (Axl Rotten and Ian Rotten) in a match at November to Remember and lost a handicap match to 911 at Holiday Hell.

The Pitbulls defeated Tony Stetson and Johnny Hotbody at Three Way Dance on April 8, 1995, which stipulated that Stetson and Hotbody would be fired by Raven's Nest. As a result of winning, Pitbulls joined Raven's Nest. Pitbulls began pursuing the World Tag Team Championship, challenging The Public Enemy (Johnny Grunge and Rocco Rock) for the titles at Hostile City Showdown but failed to win the titles. They received another title shot in a double dog collar match at Enter the Sandman, where they lost again. Dissension began between Pitbulls and Raven's Nest when Raven cost them matches against Taz and 2 Cold Scorpio and The Dudleys (Snot Dudley and Dudley Dudley) by abandoning them to solve the issue between Stevie Richards, Francine and Beulah McGillicutty. This led to Pitbulls refusing to follow Raven and Richards' orders of superbombing Luna Vachon and attacked their leaders, thus turning fan favorites at Hardcore Heaven. As a result, Pitbulls aligned with Raven's Nest rival Tommy Dreamer and began feuding with Raven and Stevie Richards, defeating them in a two out of three falls dog collar match to win the World Tag Team Championship, thanks to interference by Francine at Gangstas Paradise. They lost the title back to Raven and Richards on October 7 at South Philly Jam. Francine would become the manager of Pitbulls. Pitbulls began feuding with Jason's next tag team The Eliminators (John Kronus and Perry Saturn) after Jason confronted Francine. The two teams traded wins with each other at November to Remember and December to Dismember. At the 1996 CyberSlam event, Francine and the Pitbulls defeated Stevie Richards and Eliminators in a dog collar match. After the match, Eliminators attacked Pitbulls. Pitbulls challenged Eliminators for the World Tag Team Championship at Big Ass Extreme Bash on March 8, but failed to win the titles, thus ending the feud.

On May 11, Durante received his first opportunity for the ECW World Heavyweight Championship at A Matter of Respect, where he faced Raven and The Sandman in a three-way dance, but failed to win the title. At Fight the Power, Durante challenged Shane Douglas to a match for the ECW World Television Championship after Douglas provoked Durante into a match by insulting him and Francine, leading to Durante defeating Douglas for the title. At Hardcore Heaven, Durante lost the title to Chris Jericho after a distraction by Shane Douglas. At Heat Wave, Durante faced Jericho, Douglas and 2 Cold Scorpio in a four-way dance for the title, which Douglas won after Francine turned on Pitbulls. Douglas broke Wolfe's neck resulting in Wolfe being sidelined and Pitbull #2 feuded with Douglas throughout the rest of the year attempting to regain the World Television Championship and avenging his tag team partner's injury. Pitbull #2 unsuccessfully challenged Douglas for the title at The Doctor Is In. At Natural Born Killaz, Durante and The Sandman defeated Douglas and Raven in a double dog collar match when Durante pinned Raven. As a result of pinning Raven, Durante earned a title shot against Raven for the World Heavyweight Championship at When Worlds Collide, which he failed to win. In early 1997, Pitbull #1 recovered from injury and the two resumed their tag team to feud with The Triple Threat (Shane Douglas, Chris Candido and Brian Lee). On April 13, Durante wrestled Shane Douglas for the World Television Championship at ECW's first pay-per-view event, Barely Legal, where he failed to win the title. Pitbulls would lose the feud against The Triple Threat at Chapter 2 and then took a hiatus in July.

Pitbulls returned to ECW at As Good as it Gets, where they turned villains by aligning themselves with Lance Wright and confronting Taz, who attacked Pitbulls. As a result, Pitbull #2 began feuding with Taz and faced for the World Television Championship in a losing effort at November to Remember. Pitbulls made their last televised appearance in ECW on the December 20 episode of Hardcore TV, after which they left ECW.

On March 4, 2000, they would return to ECW as they lost to Amish Roadkill and Danny Doring.

=== Independent circuit (1997–2002) ===
After leaving ECW, Pitbulls competed in various promotions on the independent circuit. At Jersey All Pro Wrestling's (JAPW) Halloween Hell event on October 31, 1997, Durante participated in a battle royal for the inaugural JAPW Heavyweight Championship. He was eliminated by Joe Rules. Immediately after the match, Durante defeated Rules to win the title. His reign would last until December 5, 1997, when he would be stripped due to injury. Pitbulls' next notable stint was with National Wrestling Alliance (NWA) territory NWA New Jersey, where they captured the NWA United States Tag Team Championship by defeating Lance Diamond and Steve Corino on August 22, 1998. During this time, they also made an appearance in World Wrestling Federation on the August 29 episode of Shotgun Saturday Night, losing to The Headbangers. They appeared at the NWA 50th Anniversary Show, where they teamed with defending champion Stevie Richards and Dead Man Walking against Steve Corino, Lance Diamond, Doug Gilbert and Rik Ratchett in a steel cage match for the NWA National Heavyweight Championship, in which Richards lost the title to Gilbert. Pitbulls lost the United States Tag Team Championship to The Misfits (Derek Domino and Harley Lewis) on November 13. They toured many promotions including Xtreme Pro Wrestling (XPW), Frontier Martial-Arts Wrestling (FMW) and World Wrestling Council (WWC). They disbanded for a brief period of time in 2000, and reunited for only one night on May 12, 2002, at International Wrestling Association event in Puerto Rico defeating Bryan Madness and Maniac. This would be the last time the Pitbulls would be together. It was also the last match for Durante.

== Death ==
Durante died on September 25, 2003, along with his girlfriend, 29-year-old Dianna Hulsey, both from a fentanyl-induced overdose. He and his girlfriend were found after lying in their home dead for days, with needle marks on their bodies, all while their two small children, a 21-month-old boy and 8-month-old girl, were apparently alone in the house among the bodies for 24 to 48 hours. The 21-month-old boy left a trail of food from room to room, with a spilled quart of milk, chicken nuggets and bits of bread he had pulled from the refrigerator, and the eight-month-old girl was found in her crib. Both children were unharmed and custody was granted to their grandparents.

== Championships and accomplishments ==
- Allied Powers Wrestling Federation
  - APWF Tag Team Championship (1 time) - with Pitbull #1
- Catch Wrestling Association
  - CWA World Tag Team Championship (2 times) – with Larry Cameron
- Consejo Mundial de Lucha Libre
  - Occidental Tag Team Championship (1 time)
- Extreme Championship Wrestling
  - ECW World Tag Team Championship (1 time) – with Pitbull #1
  - ECW World Television Championship (1 time)
  - Hardcore Hall of Fame (2014)
- Grande Wrestling Alliance
  - GWA Tag Team Championship (1 time) – with Pitbull #1
- High Risk Championship Wrestling
  - HRCW Tag Team Championship (1 time) – with Pitbull #1
- Jersey All Pro Wrestling
  - JAPW Heavyweight Championship (1 time)
- Mid-Eastern Wrestling Federation
  - MEWF Heavyweight Championship (1 time)
- National Wrestling Alliance
  - NWA United States Tag Team Championship (New Jersey version) (2 times) – with Pitbull #1
- Pro Wrestling Illustrated
  - PWI ranked him # 76 of the 500 best singles wrestlers in the PWI 500 in 1997

== Mixed martial arts record ==
Professional record breakdown
2 matches	0 wins	2 losses
By knockout	0	0
By submission	0	2
By decision	0	0

Res.	Record	Opponent	Method	Event	Date	Round	Time	Location	Notes
Loss	0–2	Todd Broadway	Submission (armbar)	IFC: Battleground 2000	January 22, 2000	1	1:15	Kahnawake, Quebec, Canada	
Loss	0–1	Kristof Midoux	Submission (armbar)	IFC: Montreal Cage Combat	October 9, 1999	1	0:40	Montreal, Quebec, Canada	

== See also ==
- List of premature professional wrestling deaths
