= Mike Bucci =

American professional wrestler (born 1972)

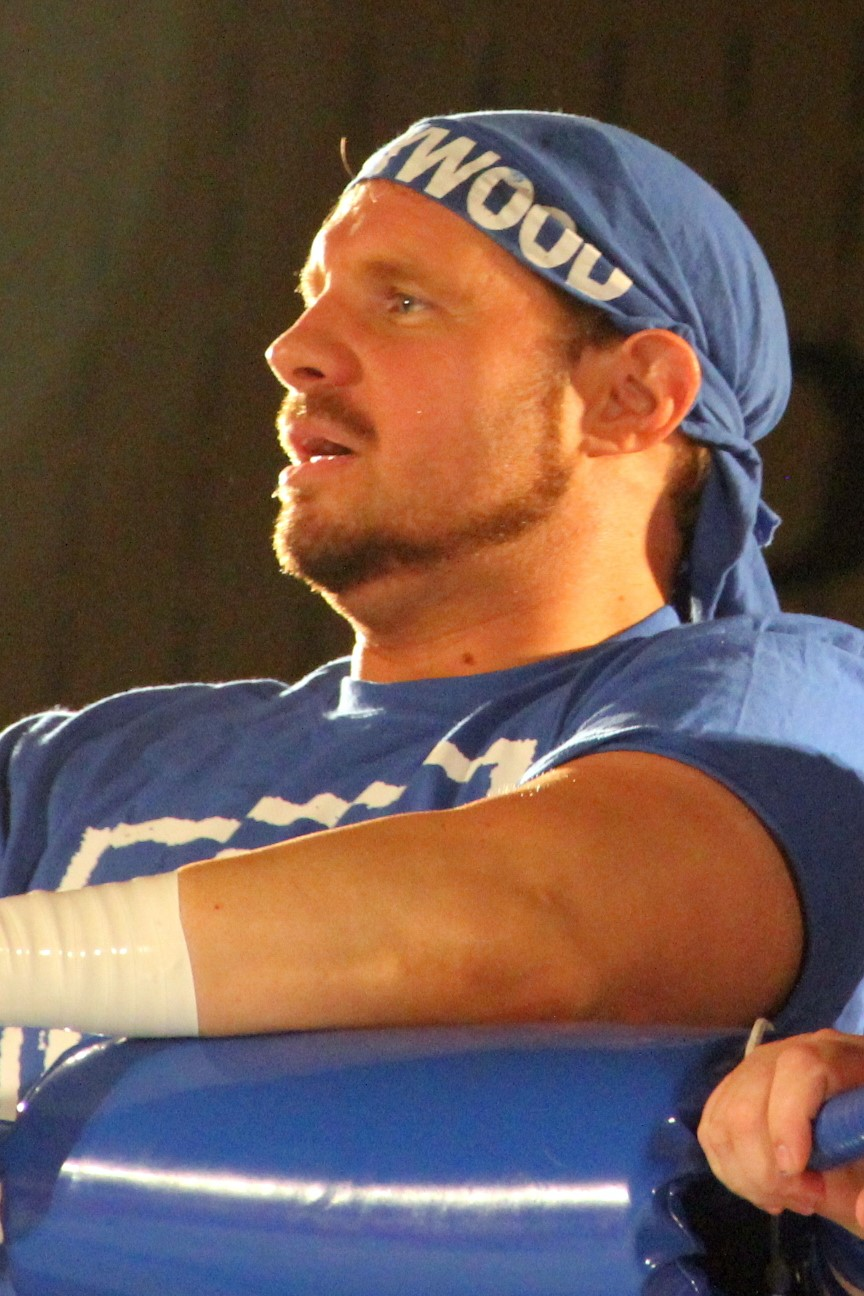
- Bucci in 2015

Personal information
- Born: Michael Bucci; June 5, 1972 (age 54) Toms River, New Jersey, U.S.
- Education: Ocean County College

Professional wrestling career
- Ring name(s): Hollywood Nova; Nova; Super Nova; Mike Moraldo; Mike Bucci; Simon Dean
- Billed height: 5 ft 10 in (178 cm)
- Billed weight: 210 lb (95 kg)
- Billed from: Clearwater, Florida (as Simon Dean); Silicon Valley (as Nova)
- Trained by: Mike Sharpe
- Debut: 1992
- Retired: 2022

Michael Bucci (born June 5, 1972) is an American retired professional wrestler. He is best known for his tenures in Extreme Championship Wrestling (ECW) as Nova, Super Nova, and "Hollywood" Nova and World Wrestling Entertainment (WWE) as Simon Dean.

== Professional wrestling career ==
=== Early career (1992–1995) ===
Bucci was trained in professional wrestling by Mike Sharpe, and debuted in 1992, wrestling on the independent circuit. In late 1993, Bucci made several appearances in the World Wrestling Federation, wrestling in tag team matches against the Steiner Brothers and the Headshrinkers on Monday Night Raw.

=== Extreme Championship Wrestling ===
==== Blue World Order (1996–1998) ====
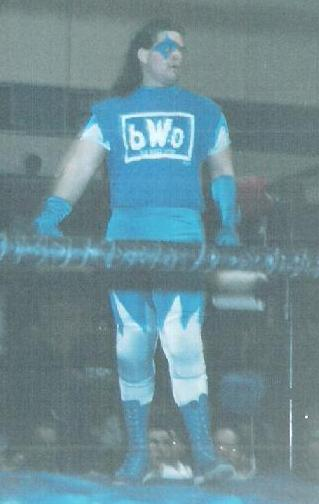
Bucci as "Hollywood" Nova

In 1996, Bucci debuted in Extreme Championship Wrestling (ECW) as Super Nova (later shortened to Nova), utilizing a superhero character. He made his ECW debut at Hostile City Showdown against El Puerto Riqueño, with the match ending in a no contest due to outside interference by The Eliminators. He was later paired with Raven, Stevie Richards, and The Blue Meanie as part of the Raven's Nest faction. Nova would often pair with Richards and Meanie to imitate rock bands such as KISS and The Jackson 5.

Bucci, along with Richards, asked permission from both Raven and Paul Heyman to parody the New World Order (nWo); it was granted, and Bucci was given credit with the creation of The Blue World Order (bWo) logo. Bucci parodied Hollywood Hogan as Hollywood Nova, Richards became "Big Stevie Cool" (a takeoff on Kevin Nash's nickname of "Big Daddy Cool"), and Meanie was "Da Blue Guy", a takeoff on Scott Hall, "The Bad Guy". bWo debuted at November to Remember where they helped Richards in defeating David Tyler Morton Jericho. Many other members were added and removed between 1996 and 1998 before the team split in the latter. bWo would become popular with the fans turning into fan favorites and leaving Raven's Nest in the process.

Richards left the bWo to return to Raven's Nest, and Nova and Meanie continued to team together as a tag team. On the July 17, 1997, episode of Hardcore TV, Nova unsuccessfully challenged Taz for the World Television Championship. bWo feuded with the much larger stable Full Blooded Italians throughout 1998, defeating them at Wrestlepalooza. In the fall of the year, bWo entered a rivalry with Danny Doring and Roadkill, defeating them at November to Remember.

==== Teaming and feuding with Chris Chetti (1999–2001) ====
After Meanie left the company, Bucci changed his gimmick, becoming Super Nova, and adopting a more serious personality. He would start wearing wrestling attires based in the suits of comic book characters like The Flash, Green Lantern and Venom. He formed a tag team with Chris Chetti as the two challenged Dudley Boyz for the World Tag Team Championship on numerous occasions but failed to win the titles. At Living Dangerously, Nova teamed with Spike Dudley to defeat the Dudley Boyz. Nova defeated Rod Price at Cyberslam. Chetti and Nova also simultaneously feuded with Danny Doring and Roadkill, trading wins at Hostile City Showdown and Heat Wave. At Anarchy Rulz, Nova and Chetti fought Simon Diamond and Tony DeVito to a no contest. At November to Remember, Nova lost to Little Guido.

The rivalry with Doring and Roadkill continued into 2000 as the team of Nova, Jazz and Kid Kash lost to Doring, Roadkill and Diamond in a six-person tag team match. At Living Dangerously, Chetti and Nova defeated Jado and Gedo in a tag team match. At Cyberslam, Nova and Jazz lost to Dawn Marie and Lance Storm at Cyberslam. At Hardcore Heaven, Chetti and Nova defeated Doring and Roadkill and Da Baldies (Angel and Tony DeVito) in a three-way dance. At Heat Wave, Chetti and Nova defeated Da Baldies. At the night one of Midtown Massacre, Chetti and Nova participated in a tournament for the vacant World Tag Team Championship, losing to Tap Out (Simon Diamond and Johnny Swinger) in the opening round. At the night two of the event, Chetti and Nova competed against Danny Doring and Roadkill and Tap Out in a three-way dance, where Chetti turned on Nova by hitting him with a chair causing them to get eliminated and breaking up the team. It marked the beginning of a heated rivalry between the two men, with Nova beating his former partner in a match where the loser was fired at November to Remember.

After Chetti's departure, Nova feuded with Hot Commodity (Julio Dinero, E. Z. Money and Chris Hamrick), wrestling Hot Commodity members Julio Dinero at Massacre on 34th Street, E. Z. Money at Holiday Hell and Chris Hamrick at ECW's final pay-per-view event Guilty as Charged on January 7, 2001. At the second to last ECW event in Poplar Bluff, Missouri, he was named as Danny Doring's substitute tag team partner (filling in for Amish Roadkill) to help defend the World Tag Team Championship against Hot Commodity; Doring and Nova successfully defended the titles. His final match for ECW took place on January 13 where he defeated Tom Marquez.

=== Independent circuit and overseas (2001–2002) ===
When ECW went out of business, Bucci, as Nova, became more active on the independent scene until 2003. Nova wrestled in various promotions such as California's Ultimate Pro Wrestling, and New Jersey's Phoenix Championship Wrestling, the latter of which was founded by his brother Don Bucci. During this time, he formed a successful tag team with Frankie Kazarian known as Evolution (not to be confused with the World Wrestling Entertainment stable of the same name). In most of the promotions they competed for, they were successful in becoming tag team champions. He also briefly wrestled in the short-lived Australia-based World Wrestling All-Stars, where he feuded with A.J. Styles amongst other cruiserweights for the promotion's International Cruiserweight Championship, which he was unable to win before the company folded. In late 2001, he also worked a number of shows in England.

=== World Wrestling Entertainment (2002–2007) ===
In April 2002, Bucci signed a developmental contract with World Wrestling Entertainment (WWE) and was assigned to Ohio Valley Wrestling (OVW). In his first OVW match, he defeated The Prototype to win the OVW Heavyweight Championship. He held the championship for several months, successfully defending it against The Prototype, Christian, Lance Cade, and Chris Kanyon, before losing it to The Damaja in October. The following year, he partnered with Aaron Stevens, and the two defeated Tank Toland and Chris Cage to win the OVW Tag Team Championship. In June 2004, Bucci became OVW's assistant booker, helping plan matches and storylines. Around the same time, he began appearing in non-televised SmackDown! dark matches and on the television program Velocity.

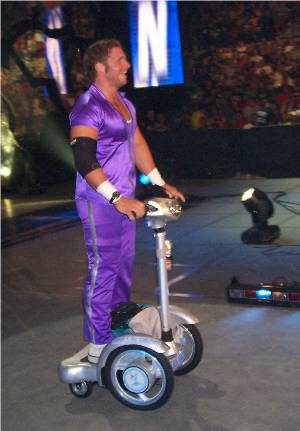
Simon Dean in 2005

Bucci subsequently adopted the ring name Simon Dean, portraying an arrogant fitness expert as his character. The name was inspired by Dean Malenko's real name, Dean Simon. Beginning in August 2004, WWE aired a series of introductory promotional segments advertising the fictional "Simon System", a fitness program involving diet, exercise, and nutritional supplements. The segments parodied television fitness infomercials, with Dean frequently insulting his supposed customers. As part of the character, he appeared as a sponsor of Raw and regularly mocked the physical fitness of audiences before his matches. He later formed a team with Maven, who was portrayed as a user of the Simon System. After receiving limited attention on the Raw brand, Bucci was transferred to the SmackDown! brand on June 30, 2005.

At ECW One Night Stand, a WWE-produced event featuring former Extreme Championship Wrestling performers, Bucci briefly revived his Hollywood Nova character alongside Da Blue Guy and Big Stevie Cool as the bWo. During the event, commentator Joey Styles referenced Bucci's Simon Dean character. After Bucci was struck with two chairs, Styles remarked, "That's more painful than having to be Simon Dean on national TV".

Following his transfer to SmackDown! in the draft lottery, Bucci initially appeared on the program as "Hollywood" Nova alongside the other members of the bWo. He subsequently resumed portraying Simon Dean on the related program Velocity. Although the bWo reunion was initially expected to be a one-time appearance, the group was later scheduled to face The Mexicools (Juventud, Psicosis, and Super Crazy) in a six-man team match at The Great American Bash. The match was announced on the same episode of SmackDown! in which Bucci appeared as Simon Dean against Booker T. At The Great American Bash, the bWo lost to the Mexicools. The reunion ended shortly afterward, as The Blue Meanie did not remain with WWE and Richards returned to his previous villainous character. Bucci continued appearing as Simon Dean.

In late August, Dean began arriving at matches aboard the "Dean Machine", a motorized vehicle resembling a Segway PT. His character also began force-feeding Simon System products to opponents who had refused to try them, usually after defeating them in brief, one-sided matches. On the September 1 episode of SmackDown!, he faced Batista, whom he claimed was a user of his fitness products. Dean made his first major WWE pay-per-view appearance at No Mercy, where he lost to Bobby Lashley. Following the match, Lashley forced Dean to eat 20 double cheeseburgers, causing him to vomit backstage. Dean later became known as the "Head of SmackDown!'s welcoming committee", a role in which he frequently lost matches to newly introduced wrestlers.

On the January 6, 2006, episode of SmackDown!, Dean challenged any tag team to a match. Paul London and Brian Kendrick accepted, but were attacked by Gymini (Jake and Jesse), two wrestlers introduced as followers of the Simon System. Dean also participated in the 2006 Royal Rumble, entering third before being eliminated by Triple H and Rey Mysterio. He subsequently served as Gymini's manager, although the team stopped appearing regularly on television after Jesse suffered an injury in May 2006. Dean then returned to primarily losing matches.

In August 2006, Bucci replaced Tommy Dreamer as a talent development manager in OVW, taking on responsibilities involving the training and development of wrestlers. He left WWE on August 31, 2007.

=== Return to the independent circuit (2009–2022) ===
On April 18, 2009, Bucci, as Hollywood Nova, along with many other ECW alumni appeared at One Pro Wrestling's "To The Extreme" weekend event, where he teamed with the Blue Meanie for his first in-ring performances in nearly 3 years. They unsuccessfully challenged Project Ego (Kris Travis and Martin Kirby) for the 1PW Tag Team Championship. Bucci has since wrestled for both 1PW and International Wrestling Cartel.

On June 27, 2009, Bucci, again as Hollywood Nova appeared with many other former ECW talent at the Francine Fournier-run benefit show entitled Legends of The Arena at the original ECW Arena in South Philadelphia. He accompanied the Blue Meanie to the ring where they as the Blue World Order defeated the team of Little Guido and Big Sal the Full Blooded Italians. On August 8, 2010, Bucci took part in Total Nonstop Action Wrestling's ECW reunion show, Hardcore Justice, where he, as Hollywood Nova, accompanied Stevie Richards to the ring and later attacked Tommy Dreamer during his match with Raven.

Bucci appeared in the "On the Spot Title Shot" Battle Royal for Pro Wrestling Syndicate in March 2015 where he reunited with BWO stablemates Stevie Richards and the Blue Meanie. The three also appeared at Pro Wrestling Syndicate's Supercard show on June 6, 2015, as part of Mick Foley's 50th Birthday Celebration. On September 4, 2015, Hollywood Nova, Big Stevie Cool, and Da Blue Guy reunited as the Blue World Order for Chikara's 2015 King of Trios tournament. They were eliminated from the tournament in their first round match by the Devastation Corporation (Blaster McMassive, Flex Rumblecrunch and Max Smashmaster). During the third night of the tournament, Bucci worked a tag team match under his Simon Dean gimmick.

His last match was on the December 3, 2022 teaming with Aron Stevens and Frankie Kazarian defeating Brian Myers, Matt Cardona and Pat Buck at SAW Contest of Champions: Where Heroes Gather in Toms River, New Jersey

== Personal life ==
He is the twin brother of Phoenix Championship Wrestling promoter and founder Don "Donnie B." Bucci. After retiring in 2007, Bucci began working as a licensed Mortgage broker throughout the United States.

== Championships and accomplishments ==
- American Wrestling Council
  - AWC Heavyweight Championship (1 time)
- Border City Wrestling
  - BCW Can-Am Tag Team Championship (1 time) – with Tommy Dreamer
- Carolina Wrestling Syndicate
  - CWS Tag Team Championship (1 time) – with The Blue Meanie
- East Coast Wrestling Alliance
  - ECWA Tag Team Championship (1 time) – with Frankie Kazarian
- Garden State Wrestling Alliance
  - GSWA Heavyweight Championship (1 time)
- Great Lakes Wrestling
  - GLW World Heavyweight Championship (1 time)
- NWA Northeast Wrestling
  - NWA Northeast Light Heavyweight Championship (1 time)
- Northeast Wrestling
  - NEW Light Heavyweight Championship (1 time)
- New Jack City Wrestling
  - NJCW Heavyweight Championship (1 time)
  - NJCW Tag Team Championship (1 time) – with Rico Casanova
- Ohio Valley Wrestling
  - OVW Heavyweight Championship (1 time)
  - OVW Southern Tag Team Championship (1 time) – with Aaron Stevens
- Phoenix Championship Wrestling
  - PCW Tag Team Championship (1 time) – with Frankie Kazarian
  - Russ Haas Memorial Tag Team Tournament (2002) – with R.C. Haas
- Premier Wrestling Federation / Pennsylvania Wrestling Federation
  - PWF Universal Heavyweight Championship (1 time)
- Pro Wrestling Illustrated
  - PWI ranked him #88 of the 500 best singles wrestlers in the PWI 500 in 2005
- Steel City Wrestling
  - SCW Tag Team Championship (1 time) – with The Blue Meanie
- Ultimate Pro Wrestling
  - UPW Tag Team Championship (1 time) – with Frankie Kazarian
  - UPW Tag Team Championship Tournament (2001) – with Frankie Kazarian
- World Wide Wrestling Alliance
  - WWWA Light Heavyweight Championship (1 time)
- XCW Wrestling Mid-West
  - XCW Mid-West Heavyweight Championship (1 time)
