= Gary Wolfe (wrestler) =

American professional wrestler (born 1967)

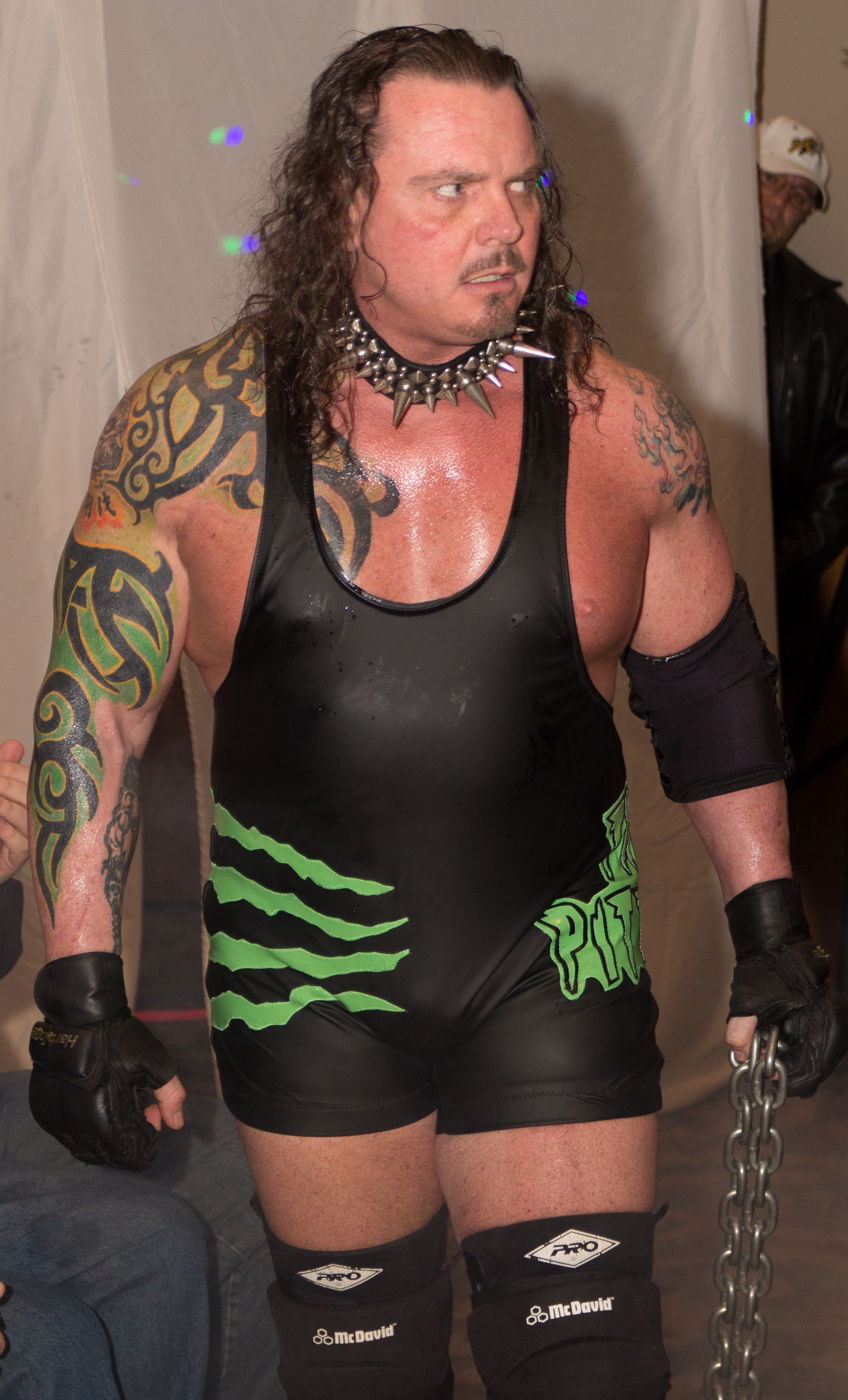
- Wolfe making his entrance at a show in March 2013

Personal information
- Born: March 11, 1967 (age 59) Hammonton, New Jersey, U.S.

Professional wrestling career
- Ring name(s): Gary Wolf; Gary Wolfe; The Pitbull; Pitbull #1; Pitbull Spike; Wolfe Job; Brute Force
- Billed height: 5 ft 9 in (175 cm)
- Billed weight: 235 lb (107 kg)
- Trained by: Larry Sharpe
- Debut: January 2, 1988

Gary Wolfe (born March 11, 1967) is an American professional wrestler best known for his time in Extreme Championship Wrestling (ECW) under the ring name Pitbull #1 as one half of the tag team called The Pitbulls, with Anthony Durante as Pitbull #2. He was a one-time Television Champion and a one-time World Tag Team Champion in ECW. He is also a former two-time 3PW World Heavyweight Champion.

== Professional wrestling career ==
=== Early career (1988–1992) ===
Wolfe made his professional wrestling debut on January 2, 1988 by teaming with Johnny Hotbody to form a tag team called The Gladiators, who lost their first match to Brad Armstrong and Tim Horner. Wolfe formed a tag team with Anthony Durante, who competed in World Wrestling Federation (WWF) as enhancement talents in 1989. Wolfe and Durante formed a tag team called American Bulldogs, which would later be renamed The Pitbulls and Mad Bull Busters. The team competed in many promotions including New Japan Pro-Wrestling (NJPW), South Atlantic Pro Wrestling and Tri-State Wrestling Alliance (TWA). Wolfe would compete under the ring name Pitbull Spike.

=== Eastern / Extreme Championship Wrestling (1992-1997) ===
==== The Pitbulls and Television Champion (1992–1994) ====
The Pitbulls debuted in Eastern Championship Wrestling (ECW) at a live event on April 25, 1992, where Pitbull Spike participated in a battle royal with the winner earning an ECW Heavyweight Championship match. Later that night, Pitbulls defeated Jeff Royal and Johnny Hotbody in the main event of the show. The Pitbulls then engaged in a brief rivalry with The Super Destroyers before departing the company.

Gary Wolf returned to ECW, making his debut as a singles competitor at Holiday Hell on December 26, 1993 under the ring name The Pitbull, where he lost to Chad Austin in his debut match. However, Pitbull attacked Austin and The Sandman, with the assistance of Jason, thus forming an alliance with Jason and established himself as a villain in the process. He aligned himself with Rockin' Rebel and the two faced Sandman and Tommy Cairo in a dog collar match in a losing effort at The Night the Line Was Crossed on February 5, 1994. On the April 19 episode of Hardcore TV, Pitbull defeated J.T. Smith to capture the ECW Television Championship when Smith was attacked by The Public Enemy before the match. Pitbull began a rivalry with The Tazmaniac after Tazmaniac was named the number one contender to his newly won Television Championship. On the May 17 episode of Hardcore TV, Pitbull lost the title to Mikey Whipwreck after a distraction by Tazmaniac. This led to a lengthy rivalry between Pitbull and Tazmaniac, beginning at When Worlds Collide, where Pitbull defeated Tazmaniac in their first match.

==== The Pitbulls reunion (1994–1997) ====
On the June 7 episode of Hardcore TV, it was announced that Pitbull would face Tazmaniac in a dog collar match at Hostile City Showdown, which Tazmaniac won. After the match, Pitbull #2 made his ECW debut and joined Pitbull in attacking Tazmaniac and thus formed The Pitbulls for the first time on ECW television. Pitbulls competed as a team for the first time in ECW at Heat Wave, where they lost to Tazmaniac and Sabu. On the July 26 episode of Hardcore TV, Pitbulls attacked their tag team partner Jimmy Snuka after they lost a match to Tommy Dreamer, Terry Funk and Dory Funk, Jr. This led to Tazmaniac making the save, leading to a match between Pitbulls and the team of Snuka and Tazmaniac at Hardcore Heaven, which Pitbulls lost, thus ending the feud. Pitbulls defeated The Bad Breed (Axl Rotten and Ian Rotten) in a match at November to Remember and lost a handicap match to 911 at Holiday Hell.

Pitbulls defeated Tony Stetson and Johnny Hotbody at Three Way Dance on April 8, 1995, which stipulated that Stetson and Hotbody would be fired by Raven's Nest. As a result of winning, Pitbulls joined Raven's Nest. Pitbulls began pursuing the World Tag Team Championship, challenging The Public Enemy (Johnny Grunge and Rocco Rock) for the titles at Hostile City Showdown but failed to win the titles. They received another title shot in a double dog collar match at Enter the Sandman, where they lost again. Dissension began between Pitbulls and Raven's Nest when Raven cost them matches against Taz and 2 Cold Scorpio and The Dudleys (Snot Dudley and Dudley Dudley) by abandoning them to solve the issue between Stevie Richards, Francine and Beulah McGillicutty. This led to Pitbulls refusing to follow Raven and Richards' orders of superbombing Luna Vachon and attacked their leaders, thus turning fan favorites at Hardcore Heaven. As a result, Pitbulls aligned with Raven's Nest rival Tommy Dreamer and began feuding with Raven and Stevie Richards, defeating them in a two out of three falls dog collar match to win the World Tag Team Championship, thanks to interference by Francine at Gangstas Paradise. They lost the title back to Raven and Richards on October 7 at South Philly Jam.

Francine would become the manager of Pitbulls. Pitbulls began feuding with Jason's next tag team The Eliminators (John Kronus and Perry Saturn) after Jason confronted Francine. The two teams traded wins with each other at November to Remember and December to Dismember. At the 1996 CyberSlam event, Francine and the Pitbulls defeated Stevie Richards and Eliminators in a dog collar match. After the match, Eliminators attacked Pitbulls. Pitbulls challenged Eliminators for the World Tag Team Championship at Big Ass Extreme Bash on March 8, but failed to win the titles, thus ending the feud.

At Heat Wave, Shane Douglas broke Wolfe's neck by hitting him with a DDT on the ECW World Television Championship. Later in the match, Francine turned on Pitbulls and helped Douglas in winning the ECW World Television Championship. This resulted in a lengthy feud between Douglas and Gary Wolfe's partner, Anthony Durante, while Wolfe recovered from his injury. Gary Wolfe can be seen on Forever Hardcore, where he talked about how he broke his neck. Wolfe was sidelined for the rest of the year, recovering from his injuries. A tribute show in support of Wolfe, Requiem for a Pitbull, was held in August 1996. Pitbull #1 returned to in-ring competition at the House Party in January 1997, where he challenged Douglas for the World Television Championship but Douglas retained the title via count-out. He received another title shot against Douglas in an "I Quit" match at Hostile City Showdown on March 15, where Douglas retained, thanks to interference by Francine. Pitbulls would lose the feud against The Triple Threat (Shane Douglas, Bam Bam Bigelow and Chris Candido) and then took a hiatus in July.

Pitbulls returned to ECW at As Good as it Gets, where they turned villains by aligning themselves with Lance Wright and confronting Taz, who attacked Pitbulls. Pitbull #1 would take a managerial role for Pitbull #2, who feuded with Taz over the World Television Championship but failed to win the title at November to Remember. Pitbulls made their last televised appearance in ECW on the December 20 episode of Hardcore TV, after which they left ECW.

=== Independent circuit (1997–2000) ===
Pitbulls competed in various independent promotions after leaving ECW. Their most notable stint was with National Wrestling Alliance (NWA) territory NWA New Jersey, where they captured the NWA United States Tag Team Championship by defeating Lance Diamond and Steve Corino on August 22, 1998. During this time, they also made an appearance in World Wrestling Federation on the August 29 episode of Shotgun Saturday Night, losing to The Headbangers. They appeared at the NWA 50th Anniversary Show, where they teamed with defending champion Stevie Richards and Dead Man Walking against Steve Corino, Lance Diamond, Doug Gilbert and Rik Ratchett in a steel cage match for the NWA National Heavyweight Championship, in which Richards lost the title to Gilbert. Pitbulls lost the United States Tag Team Championship to The Misfits (Derek Domino and Harley Lewis) on November 13. They toured many promotions including Xtreme Pro Wrestling (XPW), Frontier Martial-Arts Wrestling (FMW) and World Wrestling Council (WWC).

=== Return to ECW (2000) ===
Gary Wolfe returned to ECW at a live event on February 11, 2000, where he teamed with The Sandman and Tommy Dreamer against Jack Victory, Rhino and Steve Corino in a losing effort. Pitbull #1 made his televised return to ECW as a fan favorite on the June 25, 2000 episode of Hardcore TV, where he lost to Scotty Anton. On the July 7 episode of ECW on TNN, Pitbull #1 rescued Spike Dudley from an assault by Rhino, leading to Pitbull receiving a title shot against Rhino for the World Television Championship, which he quickly lost.

=== Return to independent circuit (2000–present) ===
Wolfe appeared regularly for Tod Gordon's Pro Wrestling Unplugged promotion as 'The Pitbull' Gary Wolfe. He also made many appearances in Pro-Pain Pro Wrestling (3PW), during his time there winning both their World Heavyweight Championship (being first to do so), and their Tag Team Championship, with Mike Kruel. Wolfe appeared at WWE's ECW One Night Stand 2005 to introduce the "ECW Remembers" video honoring "extreme" wrestlers who had died. His own partner Anthony Durante, died on September 25, 2003, from a homemade OxyContin overdose.

He has appeared in Pro Wrestling Unplugged, leading a group called Team PIT featuring wrestlers, Aramis and former Women's Champion, Annie Social. after PWU was sold to Atomic Championship Wrestling (ACW) Wolfe became one of the head trainers for the CZW Wrestling Academy replacing the late John Kronus. As a wrestling trainer Wolfe has helped trained many wrestlers. Notable graduates include The Wifebeater, Annie Social, and Johnny Kashmere.

Gary Wolfe previously co-hosted a wrestling radio show on the internet called False Count Radio.

== Championships and accomplishments ==
- Allied Powers Wrestling Federation
  - APWF Tag Team Championship (1 time) - with Pitbull #2
- Consejo Mundial de Lucha Libre
  - Occidental Tag Team Championship (1 time)
- Eastern Championship Wrestling/Extreme Championship Wrestling
  - ECW World Television Championship (1 time)
  - ECW World Tag Team Championship (1 time) - with Pitbull #2
  - Hardcore Hall of Fame (2014)
- Grande Wrestling Alliance
  - GWA Tag Team Championship (1 time) - with Pitbull #2
- High Risk Championship Wrestling
  - HRCW Tag Team Championship (1 time) - with Pitbull #2
- Independent Pro Wrestling
  - IPW Tag Team Championship (1 time) - with Pitbull #2
- National Wrestling Alliance
  - NWA United States Tag Team Championship (New Jersey version) (2 times) - with Pitbull #2
  - NWA Midwest Tag Team Championship - The Sandman
- Pro-Pain Pro Wrestling
  - 3PW World Heavyweight Championship (2 times, first champion)
  - 3PW Tag Team Championship (1 time) - with Mike Kruel
  - 3PW World Heavyweight Championship Tournament (2002)
- Pro Wrestling Illustrated
  - Ranked No. 80 of the 500 top wrestlers in the PWI 500 in 1996
