= ECW Hardcore TV =

American professional wrestling television program

- WWE Network logo
- Created by: Tod Gordon; Eddie Gilbert
- Starring: See Extreme Championship Wrestling alumni
- Narrated by: Joey Styles
- Opening theme: "Closer"/"Thunderkiss '65" mix by Nine Inch Nails & White Zombie (1994–1997) "This Is Extreme!" by Harry Slash & The Slashtones (1997–2000)
- Country of origin: United States
- No. of episodes: 401

Production
- Executive producer: Paul Heyman (September 1993–2000)
- Production locations: ECW Arena, Philadelphia, Pennsylvania; Various arenas
- Camera setup: Multicamera setup
- Running time: 58 minutes (with commercials)

Original release
- Network: Syndication
- Release: April 6, 1993 – December 31, 2000

Related
- ECW on TNN

ECW Hardcore TV is an American professional wrestling television program that was produced by the Philadelphia based promotion Extreme Championship Wrestling (ECW) composed of footage from live shows and recorded interviews. It ran in syndication from April 6, 1993 to December 31, 2000.

Even after ECW gained a nationally-available television program on The Nashville Network (TNN), Hardcore TV was considered ECW's flagship program. The rights to the show now belong to the WWE. The show was voted as Best Weekly Television Show in the 1994, 1995 and 1996 Wrestling Observer Newsletter Awards.

While primarily being taped in the United States, Hardcore TV was taped in Japan on August 11, 1996, December 22, 1997, and December 13, 1998 at Korakuen Hall in Tokyo and on September 9, 2000 at the Hershey Centre in Mississauga, Ontario, Canada.

== Format ==
Hardcore TV was edited from footage of ECW's live events from the ECW Arena and other house shows. It also included backstage promos and vignettes, which were not shown to the live crowd or included on home video releases of the events. A segment called Hype Central advertised upcoming events and ECW merchandise in a tongue in cheek manner.

Music videos from major musical acts were sometimes shown, interspersed with footage detailing the history of current feuds, as well as spectacular spots. Frequently, the ending of the show would feature a montage of several different promos, with Dick Dale's cover version of "Misirlou" as background music. These became known as "Pulp Fiction promos". The purpose of these promos was to maximize the show's limited airtime in order to keep the fans up to date with current wrestling storylines.

In keeping with ECW's unconventional approach, episodes were not structured with a build toward a main event as with typical professional wrestling programming. Any given week's program could feature any number of matches or match type. Owner/producer Paul Heyman's intent was to keep things fresh by providing variety for the viewers.

=== Censorship and content ===
Hardcore TV showed graphic violence (including blood), sexual frankness, and harsh language, all of which were key elements of the ECW product itself. Due to the late night time slots, expletives and violence were not edited from early broadcasts, and this helped to get ECW noticed. After the ECW on TNN program became available, this was a major difference between the syndicated Hardcore TV and the more mainstream program on TNN.

Hardcore TV was also notable for its unlicensed broadcast of copyrighted audio recordings, in many cases by very prominent musical acts such as Metallica and AC/DC, for use as wrestlers' entrance music. This was a sharp contrast with the practice of WWF and WCW, both of which employed their own in-house composers to create original themes for each wrestler. In a retrospective interview with media personality Chris Van Vliet, Heyman explained the shrewd way in which he handled the resultant legal disputes: after ducking record companies' cease-and-desist letters for as long as possible, he would finally agree to meet with their attorneys, only to show them copies of ECW's recent financial statements as a demonstration that the company was on the verge of bankruptcy and a lawsuit for copyright infringement would therefore be pointless. As a counterproposal, Heyman would then suggest that the record companies could instead partner with ECW to advertise their new releases on Hardcore TV and during its associated commercial time. The promotional fees generated in this manner gradually became an important revenue stream for the company. Needless to say, this unconventional arrangement did not carry over to ECW on TNN nor to ECW: Extreme Music, the compilation album of wrestler entrance themes that ECW released in 1998 through record label CMC International. In both of those cases, the original recordings were replaced with soundalike covers.

== Broadcast history ==
=== Philadelphia ===
Hardcore TV aired in permanent time slots in ECW's home territory of Philadelphia, and was also syndicated. Shows were broadcast to cable subscribers on SportsChannel Philadelphia, initially on Tuesday evenings at 6 PM, then beginning in January 1997 on Thursdays at 11 PM. After SportsChannel Philadelphia went off the air later that year, the show was broadcast variously on WPPX (channel 61) on Wednesdays at 9 PM, and WGTW (channel 48) in late-night timeslots on Fridays or Saturdays.

=== Elsewhere in Pennsylvania ===
SportsChannel Philadelphia's broadcasts of Hardcore TV were available to cable viewers in several additional locales across Central and Eastern Pennsylvania, such as the Wyoming and Lehigh Valleys, Lancaster, Reading, York, and Harrisburg. Similar to the situation in Philadelphia proper, after SportsChannel's demise in September 1997, viewers in these areas had to make do with hit-or-miss coverage on a patchwork of independent over-the-air stations. Principal among these was WYLN (channel 35 in Scranton/Wilkes-Barre), where it was initially broadcast on Saturday nights at 7 PM, then moved to the 10 PM timeslot in January 1998. Additionally, WGTW — the aforementioned Philadelphia station that added Hardcore TV to its Saturday night lineup in July 1998 — was offered on most cable systems in the Lehigh Valley.

In Pittsburgh, the show bounced around various different stations on the television dial. From August 1997 until March 1998, it could be seen on WPTT-TV (channel 22) on Saturday nights at 11 PM. Subsequently, it moved to Sunday nights on WNPA (channel 19) and WBOA (channel 29). Sadly, Hardcore TV's tenure on Pittsburgh-area television ended abruptly in August 1999, coinciding with the debut of ECW on TNN.

Lastly, Adelphia Cable's Empire Sports Network — complete with its scattershot broadcasts of Hardcore TV (see "Upstate New York" section below) — was available in some areas of the state's rural Northern Tier.

=== New York City ===
New York City was a close second behind Philadelphia on the rankings of ECW's most crucial television markets, and similarly to its counterpart, Hardcore TV enjoyed a continuous presence on the city's airwaves for nearly the entire length of its existence — principally on the MSG Network, where it debuted in January 1995 and ran in the Saturday night 1 AM timeslot for the next six years. From 1997 to 1998, the show also aired in various Saturday late-night slots on WPXN (channel 31). The sole exception was a three-week period in the fall of 1998 when Hardcore TV was left without a broadcast television outlet in the New York area, which resulted in Tommy Dreamer and Paul Heyman appearing in person outside area venues to hand out videotapes of past episodes.

=== Upstate New York ===
MSG's aforementioned broadcast of Hardcore TV was initially carried statewide. However, for viewers in the Buffalo, Rochester, Syracuse, Corning/Elmira, St. Lawrence Valley, and Adirondack regions, cable distribution rights were transferred in January 1998 to Adelphia, who went on to air the program on its Empire Sports Network in various late-night and early-morning timeslots over the next three years. Meanwhile, in Binghamton, the Capital District, and the Mohawk Valley, it remained on MSG as before.

Terrestrial television outlets carrying Hardcore TV included WBGT (channel 40 in Rochester), WNCE (channel 8 in Albany), and WNYO (channel 49 in Buffalo), which broadcast it on Saturday nights at 1 AM, Saturday nights at 7 PM, and Sunday nights at 1 AM respectively.

An exception to the above rule was the Champlain Valley media market in the far northeast corner of the state, which for cable customers was considered part of NESN's regional purview, rather than MSG or Empire. Consequently, until the debut of the TNN series in August 1999, local-area ECW fans were relegated to the Saturday night broadcasts of Hardcore TV on WBVT, a low-power WB/UPN affiliate that broadcast on channel 39 out of nearby Burlington, Vermont. WBVT was carried on most cable systems in the New York half of the market, and was also available over-the-air in the immediate Plattsburgh area via translator station W49BI.

=== New Jersey ===
In addition to MSG and SportsChannel Philadelphia, which were viewable in the outlying parts of their respective television markets, ECW Hardcore TV was also a longtime Friday-night staple on the Cable Television Network, a cooperatively-operated public-access television service that was offered on cable systems statewide.

=== Chicago and Northwest Indiana ===
In the Chicago and Northwest Indiana market, the show traded back and forth among WCIU 26 on Saturdays, and UPN station WPWR 50, broadcast in both Chicago and Gary, on Friday nights, a week behind. Meanwhile, KBS Chicago (a Korean station that also carried Big Japan shows at midnight) broadcast Hardcore TV on Friday nights.

=== Orlando ===
WRBW in Orlando aired Hardcore TV in a very late night timeslot on Saturdays. Also, WNFM (then known as WSWF), a cable only WB affiliate in Fort Myers, aired Hardcore TV in a primetime slot on Saturday Nights. The rest of Florida got Hardcore TV on regional sports network the Sunshine Network very late on Friday nights. WRBW invoked syndex, meaning ECW was blacked out in the Orlando market on Sunshine.

=== Other markets in the United States ===
Hardcore TV was aired on KJLA in Los Angeles on Saturday nights, WUNI in Worcester-Boston very late on Friday nights, WBVC TV-61 in Traverse City, Michigan and WADL-TV in Detroit, Michigan late Friday Nights, WUCT TV-52 in Dayton, Ohio, The Cat in Cleveland and Akron, Ohio late Friday nights, and WGMB Fox 44 in Baton Rouge, Louisiana on Saturday afternoons and late night. In the Hampton Roads region of Virginia, it was broadcast on WPEN channel 68, initially as part of a Saturday-night indie wrestling-themed programming block that also included USWA Championship Wrestling out of Memphis as well as Jim Cornette's Smoky Mountain Wrestling. Hardcore TV also aired very late on Friday nights on KTSF TV-26 in San Francisco, California, on Fridays at 11 on KGMC 43 in Fresno, California, KCNG-TV and UPN25 in Las Vegas, Nevada at 1pm on Saturdays, and on SportSouth in Georgia, Alabama, Mississippi, Tennessee, Kentucky, North Carolina, and South Carolina.

=== Additional networks ===
- America One Network
- Bravo (British TV channel)

=== Online Streaming ===
Episodes were at one time available for download on the websites of some affiliate stations.

All episodes were available for streaming on Peacock in the United States and the WWE Network internationally.

In January 2025, the WWE, now part of TKO Group Holdings, signed a 10-year media rights deal with Netflix for their flagship show Monday Night RAW in the United States, and all WWE weekly shows and PLEs internationally. As a result, the WWE Network ended and Peacock stopped showing WWE’s on-demand video library and archives on December 31, 2025.

== See also ==
- ECW on TNN
- List of professional wrestling television series
