= ECW World Television Championship =

Former championship by Extreme Championship Wrestling

- The final ECW World Television Championship title belt design

Details
- Promotion: Extreme Championship Wrestling
- Date established: August 12, 1992
- Date retired: April 11, 2001

Other names
- NWA-ECW Television Championship; ECW Television Championship
Statistics
- First champion: Johnny Hotbody
- Final champions: Rhyno; Matt Cardona (unrecognized)
- Most reigns: 2 Cold Scorpio (4)
- Longest reign: Rob Van Dam (700 days)
- Shortest reign: Taz and 2 Cold Scorpio (<1 day)
- Oldest champion: Jimmy Snuka (49 years)
- Youngest champion: Mikey Whipwreck (20 years)
- Heaviest champion: Bam Bam Bigelow (360 lb (160 kg))
- Lightest champion: Jason (180 lb (82 kg))

The ECW World Television Championship was a professional wrestling television championship in Extreme Championship Wrestling (ECW). It was introduced in 1992 as part of National Wrestling Alliance (NWA) affiliate and ECW precursor, Eastern Championship Wrestling, but was established under ECW in 1994. It served as the secondary championship in the ECW.

== History ==
The title was introduced on August 12, 1992, to Eastern Championship Wrestling, as the promotion was then known, as the Eastern Championship Wrestling Television Championship. ECW was a member of the NWA until seceding from that organization, in January 1993 and officially in September 1994 and becoming Extreme Championship Wrestling. The title then became known as the Extreme Championship Wrestling World Television Championship. The title's final defense took place on December 15, 2000, when the title belt was stolen out of the locker room and was retired in April 2001, when ECW closed down. ECW's assets were subsequently purchased by World Wrestling Entertainment (WWE). In 2006, WWE relaunched the ECW franchise as a WWE brand that remained active until 2010, but did not bring back the title, choosing only to revive the ECW World Heavyweight Championship.

In January 2022, 21 years after ECW's closure, at Game Changer Wrestling's event "Most Notorious", the last ECW Television Champion Rhino, appeared with the physical title belt and "defended" it against Matt Cardona. Cardona won the match and was declared the "new" ECW World Television Champion. This title change is not recognized by WWE, the promotion that has the rights of the title. The next day, Cardona threw the title into a garbage can.
