= WWE TLC: Tables, Ladders & Chairs =

WWE pay-per-view and livestreaming event series

- WWE TLC: Tables, Ladders & Chairs logo
- Promotions: WWE
- Brands: Raw (2009–2010, 2017–2020); SmackDown (2009–2010, 2016, 2018–2020); 205 Live (2018); ECW (2009); NXT (2026)
- Other names: TLC: Tables, Ladders, Chairs...and Stairs (2014)
- First event: 2009
- Signature matches: Tables, Ladders, and Chairs match

WWE TLC: Tables, Ladders & Chairs is a professionaltling premium live event produced by WWE, a Connecticut-based promotion. The event was established in 2009, replacing Armageddon in the December slot of WWE's calendar, and it was originally held for WWE's main roster. In 2017, the event was moved to October, but returned to December in 2018. An event was scheduled for 2021, but it was canceled in favor of a New Year's Day event called Day 1. After six years, it was reinstated for December 2026 for WWE's developmental brand, NXT. The concept of the event is based on the primary matches of the card each containing a stipulation using tables, ladders, and/or chairs as legal weapons, with the main event generally contested as a Tables, Ladders, and Chairs match.

The event was established during the first WWE brand extension, and the inaugural event featured wrestlers from the Raw, SmackDown, and ECW brands. Following ECW's disbandment in 2010, the 2010 TLC event only featured Raw and SmackDown before the first brand extension ended in August 2011. The brand split was reinstated in 2016 and TLC that year was held exclusively for SmackDown, while in 2017, it was held exclusively for Raw. Following WrestleMania 34 in 2018, brand-exclusive pay-per-views were discontinued, thus the 2018 event featured the Raw, SmackDown, and 205 Live brands, while the 2019 and 2020 events only featured Raw and SmackDown. The 2026 event will be held exclusively for NXT.

The 2013 TLC event was notable as it saw the unification of the WWE Championship and World Heavyweight Championship (2002–2013 version), where Randy Orton defeated John Cena in a TLC match to unify the titles as the WWE World Heavyweight Championship; the lineage of the World Heavyweight Championship was retired as the unified title continued the lineage of the WWE Championship, and following the 2016 event, the title reverted to the shortened name. The 2018 event saw the first-ever women's three-way TLC match, which was also the first time that the SmackDown Women's Championship (renamed Women's World Championship in 2023) was defended in the main event match of a PPV, while the 2019 event saw the first women's tag team TLC match, which was also the first time that the WWE Women's Tag Team Championship was defended in the main event match of a PPV.

== History ==
From 1999 to 2008 (except in 2001), World Wrestling Entertainment (WWE, which became an orphaned initialism in 2011) ran a pay-per-view (PPV) event titled Armageddon, and it was held in December. In 2009, the company decided to replace Armageddon with a new PPV. In August that year, WWE ran a poll on their website to allow fans to vote on the concept of this PPV, with the choices being an event themed around street fight main events, an event featuring a single-elimination tournament, and an event featuring matches that contained stipulations using tables, ladders, and/or chairs as legal weapons with the main event being a Tables, Ladders, and Chairs (TLC) match. The concept of a TLC-themed event was chosen and the event was aptly named TLC: Tables, Ladders & Chairs. The first event was then held on December 13, 2009, in San Antonio, Texas at the AT&T Center. A second event was held the following year, thus establishing TLC as an annual event for the promotion.

In 2014, WWE launched their online streaming service, the WWE Network, and in addition to traditional PPV, these events also began to air on the streaming service. The 2014 event was in turn the first TLC to air on the WWE Network. The 2014 event also had an alternative title of "Tables, Ladders, Chairs... and Stairs" as the event contained a Steel Stairs match in addition to the event's themed matches. In 2017, the event was moved to the October slot of WWE's PPV calendar, however, it returned to December in 2018 due to the cancellation of that year's Clash of Champions event. As a result of the COVID-19 pandemic that began affecting the industry in March 2020, WWE had to hold its events behind closed doors. The 2020 event was in turn held in WWE's bio-secure bubble called the WWE ThunderDome, hosted at Tropicana Field in St. Petersburg, Florida. Subsequently, it was the first WWE pay-per-view and WWE Network event presented from the ThunderDome at Tropicana Field, as the ThunderDome was previously hosted at the Amway Center in Orlando, Florida.

The 2021 TLC was canceled due to the scheduling of an event titled Day 1 that took place on January 1, 2022. Wrestling journalist Dave Meltzer reported that TLC, which was scheduled for December 19, 2021, was canceled to allow WWE to focus on Day 1 after November's Survivor Series. There would have also only been two weeks between TLC and Day 1, followed by the Royal Rumble in late January. In October 2021, WWE revealed their PPV calendar for 2022 and TLC was not included, thus TLC was discontinued.

During NXT Halloween Havoc on October 31, 2026, it was announced that after six years, TLC would return as a premium live event (PLE) for WWE's developmental brand, NXT. This event is the first TLC to be branded as a PLE, and will take place on December 12, 2026, at the brand's home venue, the WWE Performance Center in Orlando, Florida.

To coincide with the WWE brand extension, in which the company divided its roster into brands where wrestlers exclusively performed, the inaugural event featured wrestlers from the Raw, SmackDown, and ECW brands. It would be the only TLC event to feature the ECW brand as that brand was disbanded in February 2010. The 2010 event would be the last held under the first brand extension, as in August 2011, the first brand extension was dissolved. In mid-2016, the brand split was reintroduced, and the 2016 event was held exclusively for wrestlers from the SmackDown brand, while the 2017 event was in turn held exclusively for Raw. Following WrestleMania 34 in 2018, brand-exclusive PPVs were discontinued, thus the 2018 event featured Raw, SmackDown, and 205 Live, while the final two events featured only Raw and SmackDown after 205 Live merged under NXT in September 2019.

== Concept ==
The concept of this pay-per-view was that the main event matches were generally contested as a Tables, Ladders, and Chairs match, while the undercard matches would typically feature tables matches, ladder matches, and chairs matches. At the 2010 event, every match except one involved tables, ladders, or chairs. The 2014 event also included a steel stairs match, where the steel stairs could be used as a legal weapon.

In a tables match, the only way to win is for a wrestler to put their opponent through a table. In a ladder match, the only way to win is to climb a ladder and retrieve an item hanging above the center of the ring (for example, a championship belt). In a chairs match, only chairs can be used as legal weapons, but the only way to win is by pinfall or submission in the ring. In a Tables, Ladders, and Chairs match, all three are allowed to be used as legal weapons and there are no count-outs, but it has a couple of ways to win depending on if it is a championship match or not. In a non-title TLC match, the only way of winning is by pinfall or submission, while in a championship TLC match, the only way to win is the same as a regular ladder match.

=== Notable TLC matches ===
With the event's TLC theme, some of the TLC matches over the event's history were notable for the company as a whole. Following the dissolution of the first brand extension in August 2011, the company no longer had a need for two world championships. After two years, this matter would be settled at the 2013 TLC event. In the main event, reigning WWE Champion, Randy Orton, faced reigning World Heavyweight Champion (2002–2013 version), John Cena, in a title unification match that was contested as a TLC match. Orton would defeat Cena to unify the titles as the WWE World Heavyweight Championship, which continued the lineage of the WWE Championship while the World Heavyweight Championship was retired; immediately after the 2016 TLC event, the title reverted to being called WWE Championship.

In the midst of WWE's "Women's Evolution", which began in 2016 and saw female performers begin to be treated on an equal level as the men, the 2018 event saw the first-ever women's three-way TLC match, which was the first time that the SmackDown Women's Championship (renamed Women's World Championship in 2023) was defended in the main event of a PPV. This was followed up at the 2019 event, which saw the first women's tag team TLC match, which was also the first time that the WWE Women's Tag Team Championship was defended in the main event match of a PPV.

== Events ==
Raw-branded event	SmackDown-branded event	NXT-branded event

#	Event	Date	City	Venue	Main event	Ref.
1	TLC: Tables, Ladders & Chairs (2009)	December 13, 2009	San Antonio, Texas	AT&T Center	Jeri-Show (Big Show and Chris Jericho) (c) vs. D-Generation X (Shawn Michaels and Triple H) in a Tables, Ladders, and Chairs match for the Unified WWE Tag Team Championship	
2	TLC: Tables, Ladders & Chairs (2010)	December 19, 2010	Houston, Texas	Toyota Center	John Cena vs. Wade Barrett in a Chairs match	
3	TLC: Tables, Ladders & Chairs (2011)	December 18, 2011	Baltimore, Maryland	1st Mariner Arena	CM Punk (c) vs. Alberto Del Rio vs. The Miz in a Triple Threat Tables, Ladders, and Chairs match for the WWE Championship	
4	TLC: Tables, Ladders & Chairs (2012)	December 16, 2012	Brooklyn, New York	Barclays Center	Dolph Ziggler (contract holder) vs. John Cena in a Ladder match for Ziggler's World Heavyweight Championship Money in the Bank contract	
5	TLC: Tables, Ladders & Chairs (2013)	December 15, 2013	Houston, Texas	Toyota Center	Randy Orton (WWE Champion) vs. John Cena (World Heavyweight Champion) in a Tables, Ladders, and Chairs match to unify the WWE Championship and the World Heavyweight Championship as the WWE World Heavyweight Championship	
6	TLC: Tables, Ladders, Chairs... and Stairs (2014)	December 14, 2014	Cleveland, Ohio	Quicken Loans Arena	Bray Wyatt vs. Dean Ambrose in a Tables, Ladders, and Chairs match	
7	TLC: Tables, Ladders & Chairs (2015)	December 13, 2015	Boston, Massachusetts	TD Garden	Sheamus (c) vs. Roman Reigns in a Tables, Ladders, and Chairs match for the WWE World Heavyweight Championship	
8	TLC: Tables, Ladders & Chairs (2016)	December 4, 2016	Dallas, Texas	American Airlines Center	AJ Styles (c) vs. Dean Ambrose in a Tables, Ladders, and Chairs match for the WWE World Championship	
9	TLC: Tables, Ladders & Chairs (2017)	October 22, 2017	Minneapolis, Minnesota	Target Center	Dean Ambrose, Kurt Angle, and Seth Rollins vs. Braun Strowman, Cesaro, Kane, Sheamus, and The Miz in a 5-on-3 handicap Tables, Ladders, and Chairs match	
10	TLC: Tables, Ladders & Chairs (2018)	December 16, 2018	San Jose, California	SAP Center	Becky Lynch (c) vs. Asuka vs. Charlotte Flair in a Triple Threat Tables, Ladders, and Chairs match for the WWE SmackDown Women's Championship	
11	TLC: Tables, Ladders & Chairs (2019)	December 15, 2019	Minneapolis, Minnesota	Target Center	The Kabuki Warriors (Asuka and Kairi Sane) (c) vs. Becky Lynch and Charlotte Flair in a Tables, Ladders, and Chairs match for the WWE Women's Tag Team Championship	
12	TLC: Tables, Ladders & Chairs (2020)	December 20, 2020	St. Petersburg, Florida	WWE ThunderDome at Tropicana Field	"The Fiend" Bray Wyatt vs. Randy Orton in a Firefly Inferno match	
13	NXT TLC: Tables, Ladders & Chairs (2026)	December 12, 2026	Orlando, Florida	WWE Performance Center		
(c) – refers to the champion(s) heading into the match

== See also ==
- Tables, Ladders, and Chairs match
