= WWE in Australia =

Series of professional wrestling events in Australia by American promotion WWE

- Created by: Vince McMahon
- Promotions: WWE
- Brands: Raw; SmackDown; NXT
- First event: 1985 tour

WWE, an American professional wrestling promotion based in Stamford, Connecticut, in the United States owned by TKO Group Holdings, has been promoting events in Australia since 1985 when they were the World Wrestling Federation.

== History ==
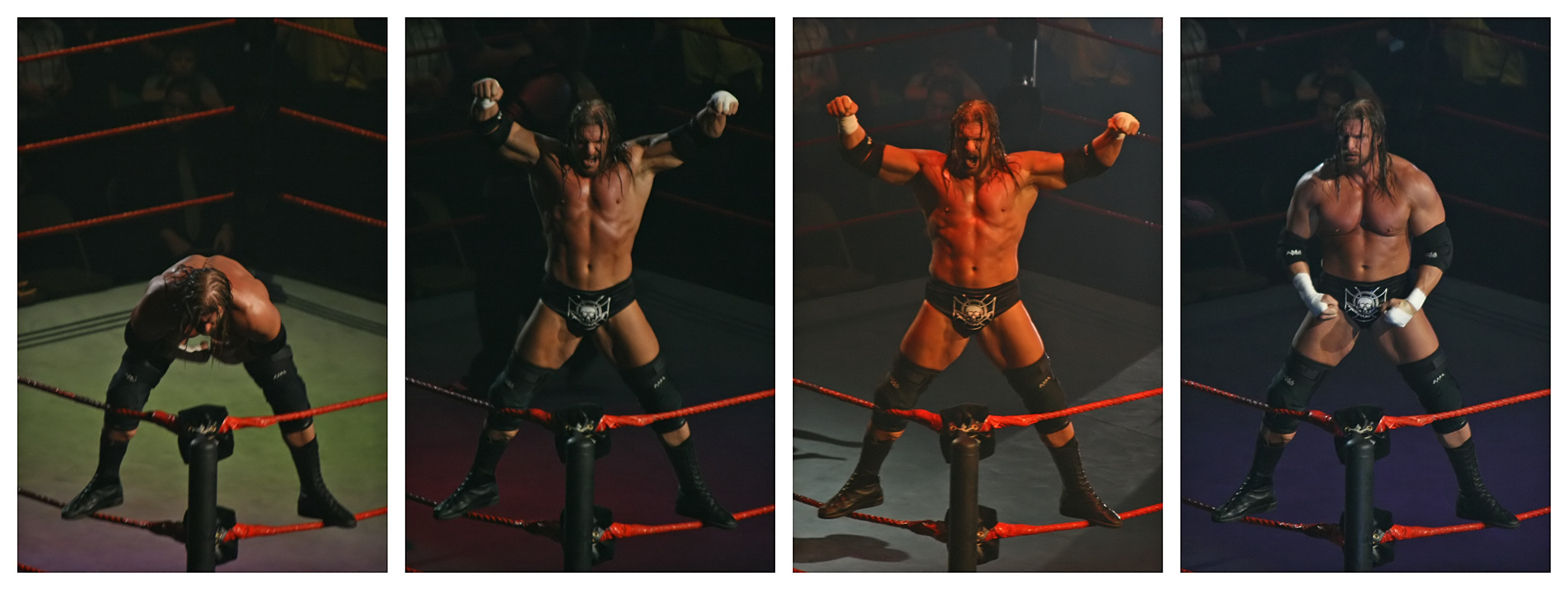
Sequence showing Triple H performing his ring entrance pose at the Rod Laver Arena in Melbourne during the November 2007 WWE tour

WWF first toured the country in 1985, visiting Melbourne, Perth, Newcastle and through Brisbane and Melbourne again in 1986. The next time WWE came to Australia was for the WWE Global Warning Tour in 2002 for what was the first WWE event in Australia in 16 years. WWE has visited Australia regularly since then by touring at least once a year from 2003 to 2019, with the 2020 and 2021 tours postponed due to the COVID-19 pandemic.. WWE's NXT brand made its first tour in December 2016.

In 2018, WWE announced Super Show-Down at the Melbourne Cricket Ground – the first ever WWE pay-per-view (PPV) to be held in Australia. In 2023, WWE announced the 2024 edition of Elimination Chamber to be held in Perth Stadium in February 2024.

In May 2025, WWE announced the 2025 edition of Crown Jewel to be held alongside Monday Night Raw and Friday Night SmackDown at the Perth Arena between October 10 and October 13.

== WWE Global Warning Tour: Melbourne ==
WWE Global Warning Tour: Melbourne
- Promotion: World Wrestling Entertainment
- Brand: SmackDown!
- Date: August 10, 2002
- City: Melbourne, Victoria, Australia
- Venue: Docklands Stadium
- Attendance: 56,734

WWE Global Warning Tour: Melbourne was a professional wrestling event produced by World Wrestling Entertainment that took place on August 10, 2002, at Docklands Stadium in Melbourne. This event marked the return of WWE to Australia for the first time since 1986. Michael Cole and Tazz recorded the commentary from WWE headquarters in Stamford, Connecticut. The event featured nine matches (including 3 dark matches), where in the main event The Rock defeated Triple H and Brock Lesnar in a Triple Threat match to retain the WWE Undisputed Championship. Global Warning did not air on pay-per-view (PPV), but was released on home video. The event aired in November 2002 as part of the WWE Fanatic Series and in January 2003 on Sky 1 in New Zealand. In October 2018, Global Warning was added to the on demand list on the WWE Network. It was re-released on DVD in December 2018, as part of a double pack with WWE Super Show-Down.

Other on-screen personnel
Role:	Name:
Commentator	Michael Cole
Commentator	Tazz
Ring Announcer	Tony Chimel
General Manager	Stephanie McMahon

No.	Results	Stipulations	Times
1	Rikishi defeated Rico	Kiss My Ass match	2:32
2^{D}	Mark Henry and Randy Orton defeated Reverend D-Von and Batista	Tag team match	7:00
3	Jamie Noble (c) (with Nidia) defeated The Hurricane	Singles match for the WWE Cruiserweight Championship	8:45
4^{D}	Hardcore Holly and Chavo Guerrero (with Maven) defeated Billy and Chuck	Tag team match	15:00
5^{D}	Kurt Angle defeated Test	Singles match	11:00
6	The Un-Americans (Lance Storm and Christian) (c) defeated Billy Kidman and Rey Mysterio	Tag Team match for the World Tag Team Championship	9:10
7	Edge defeated Chris Jericho	Singles match	12:49
8	Torrie Wilson defeated Stacy Keibler	Bra and panties match	4:45
9	The Rock (c) defeated Triple H and Brock Lesnar (with Paul Heyman)	Triple Threat match for the WWE Undisputed Championship	14:35
(c) / – the champion(s) heading into the match; D / – this was a dark match

== NXT television taping ==
The first tour to Australia of the NXT brand in December 2016 included a show at Melbourne's Margaret Court Arena which served as a television taping for NXT's January 4, 2017, edition on the WWE Network. Five matches from the show were shown, with Shinsuke Nakamura retaining the NXT Championship against Samoa Joe as the main event. Of the other matches shown three featured Australian wrestlers. Buddy Murphy teamed with Tye Dillinger to defeat the team of Bobby Roode and Elias, TM-61 were defeated by the NXT Tag Team champions DIY (Tommaso Ciampa and Johnny Gargano), and Billie Kay along with Liv Morgan were defeated by Ember Moon. The other televised match saw The Revival defeat the team of Riddick Moss and Tino Sabbatelli. In matches not televised, Peyton Royce could not defeat NXT Women's champion Asuka, Andrade Almas defeated Wesley Blake and Oney Lorcan defeated Patrick Clark.

== Super Show-Down (2018) ==
WWE Super Show-Down was a professional wrestling pay-per-view (PPV) event and WWE Network event, produced by WWE for their Raw, SmackDown, and 205 Live brands. It took place on October 6, 2018, at the Melbourne Cricket Ground in Melbourne, Australia and featured ten matches including two involving Australian wrestlers, Buddy Murphy and The IIconics. Murphy defeated Cedric Alexander to win the WWE Cruiserweight Championship, while Billie Kay and Peyton Royce defeated the team of Asuka and Naomi. Elias in a microphone spot also referenced Australian sport, claiming he was friends with Mick Malthouse and accused Collingwood of choking in the previous weekend's match. The event drew 70,309 people.

== Elimination Chamber: Perth ==
On 21 September 2023, WWE announced that Elimination Chamber would take place on 24 February 2024 at Perth Stadium. The event featured five matches, including one on the pre-show, featuring two Australian wrestlers, Indi Hartwell and Rhea Ripley. Hartwell and Candice LeRae failed to win the WWE Women's Tag Team Championship from The Kabuki Warriors (Asuka and Kairi Sane) on the pre-show while Ripley defeated Australia-born Nia Jax in the main event to retain the Women's World Championship. Australia native Grayson Waller hosted his talk show, The Grayson Waller Effect featuring Cody Rhodes and World Heavyweight Champion Seth "Freakin" Rollins.

== Crown Jewel: Perth ==
The 2025 Crown Jewel, also promoted as Crown Jewel: Perth, was a professional wrestling event produced by the American company WWE. It was the seventh Crown Jewel and took place on Saturday, October 11, 2025, at the Perth Arena in Perth. The event featured the crowning of the second men's and women's Crown Jewel Champions. Crown Jewel featured five matches including two Australian wrestlers, Bronson Reed and Rhea Ripley. Reed defeated Roman Reigns in an Australian Street Fight while Ripley teamed with Iyo Sky to defeat The Kabuki Warriors (Asuka and Kairi Sane).

== Wrestlepalooza: Perth ==
The 2026 Wrestlepalooza, also promoted as Wrestlepalooza: Perth, is an upcoming professional wrestling pay-per-view (PPV) and livestreaming event produced by WWE. It will be the sixth overall Wrestlepalooza event and the second under the WWE banner, as well as the first Wrestlepalooza to be held outside of North America. The event will take place on Saturday, December 12, 2026, at RAC Arena in Perth, Western Australia, Australia. This will be WWE's first main roster PPV and livestreaming event in December since 2020.

== Tours ==
Raw-branded event	SmackDown-branded event	NXT-branded event

Year	Tour	Notes
1985	WWF Australian tour	Melbourne, Sydney, Newcastle & Perth house shows
1986	WWF Australian tour	Melbourne, Sydney, Brisbane, Perth & Adelaide house shows
2002	WWE Global Warning Tour: Melbourne	Taped event later released on DVD, VHS and WWE Network
2003	WWE Raw Ruthless Aggression	Sydney, & Melbourne house shows
2003	WWE Passport to SmackDown	Perth House show
2004	WWE SmackDown Superstars Return of the Deadman Tour	Sydney, Brisbane & Melbourne house shows
2005	WWE Raw WrestleMania Revenge Tour	Brisbane, Newcastle & Sydney house shows
2005	WWE SmackDown WrestleMania Revenge Tour	Melbourne, Perth, & Adelaide house shows
2005	WWE Raw Survivor Series Tour	Sydney, Adelaide & Melbourne house shows
2006	WWE SmackDown Road to Wrestlemania 22 Tour	Sydney & Brisbane house shows.
2006	WWE Raw SummerSlam Tour	Melbourne, Newcastle, Sydney & Brisbane house shows
2007	WWE Raw Survivor Series Tour	Melbourne, Sydney & Brisbane house shows.
2008	WWE SmackDown ECW Tour	Melbourne, Sydney, Newcastle, Adelaide & Brisbane house shows
2009	WWE Raw Live Tour	Melbourne, Sydney, Perth, Adelaide & Brisbane house shows
2010	WWE SmackDown Live 2010	Melbourne, Sydney, Perth, Adelaide & Brisbane house shows
2011	WWE World Tour	Melbourne, Sydney, Perth, Adelaide & Brisbane house shows
2012	WWE Raw World Tour	Melbourne, Sydney & Brisbane house shows
2013	WWE Raw World Tour	Melbourne, Sydney, Perth, Adelaide & Brisbane house shows
2014	WWE Live	Melbourne, Sydney & Perth house shows
2015	WWE Live	Brisbane, Melbourne & Sydney house shows
2016	WWE Live: Australia	Melbourne, Adelaide & Sydney house shows
2016	WWE NXT Live	Perth, Canberra, Melbourne, Newcastle, Gold Coast & Sydney shows
2017	WWE Live: Australia	Melbourne, Sydney & Brisbane house shows
2018	WWE Super Show-Down	Pay-per-view event at the Melbourne Cricket Ground
2019	WWE Live: Australia	Melbourne, Sydney & Brisbane house shows
2024	WWE Elimination Chamber	Pay-per-view event at Perth Stadium
2025	WWE Takeover Perth	Friday Night Smackdown, WWE Crown Jewel Premium live event, and Monday Night Raw at Perth Arena
2026	WWE Takeover Perth	Friday Night Smackdown, Wrestlepalooza: Perth Premium live event, and Monday Night Raw at Perth Arena

== Brisbane Cup ==
Between 2006 and 2011, the Brisbane Cup was awarded to the winner of a Battle Royal held on RAW and SmackDown House Shows in Brisbane. The winner would also receive a World Championship match that same evening.

Winner	Date Won	Event	Location	Notes
Mark Henry	5 March 2006	SmackDown House Show	Brisbane	Earned the right to challenge Kurt Angle for the World Heavyweight Championship
Jeff Hardy	8 November 2007	RAW House Show	Brisbane	Earned the right to challenge Randy Orton for the WWE Championship
John Cena	5 July 2009	RAW House Show	Brisbane	Earned the right to challenge Randy Orton for the WWE Championship
The Big Show	2 August 2010	SmackDown House Show	Brisbane	Earned the right to challenge Kane for the World Heavyweight Championship
CM Punk	5 July 2011	RAW House Show	Brisbane	Earned the right to challenge John Cena for the WWE Championship
