= Survivor Series (2012) =

WWE pay-per-view event

- Promotional poster featuring The Miz
- Promotion: WWE
- Date: November 18, 2012
- City: Indianapolis, Indiana (Note: The event was originally scheduled to be held at the Consol Energy Center in Pittsburgh, Pennsylvania.)
- Venue: Bankers Life Fieldhouse
- Attendance: 8,500
- Buy rate: 212,000

Pay-per-view chronology
← Previous; Hell in a Cell	Next → TLC: Tables, Ladders & Chairs

Survivor Series chronology
← Previous; 2011	Next → 2013

The 2012 Survivor Series was a professional wrestling pay-per-view (PPV) event produced by WWE. It was the 26th annual Survivor Series and took place on November 18, 2012, at Bankers Life Fieldhouse in Indianapolis, Indiana, which was the first Survivor Series held in the U.S. state of Indiana. The event was highlighted by the titular Survivor Series match, a tag team elimination match that pits teams of multiple wrestlers against each other.

The event was originally planned to be held at the Consol Energy Center in Pittsburgh, Pennsylvania, but WWE relocated the event to Indianapolis as it would have conflicted with the Sunday Night Football game that pitted the Pittsburgh Steelers against the Baltimore Ravens during the 2012 National Football League season. WWE would later give Pittsburgh its infamous and controversial Royal Rumble event that was held in 2014.

Seven matches took place at the event, including one on the pre-show, as well as two Survivor Series matches on the main card. In the main event, CM Punk defeated John Cena and Ryback to retain the WWE Championship. In other prominent matches, Eve Torres retained the WWE Divas Championship against Kaitlyn, and Antonio Cesaro retained the WWE United States Championship against R-Truth.

The event received 212,000 pay-per-view buys, down from 281,000 buys the previous year. The event is best known for the onscreen main roster debut of Dean Ambrose, Roman Reigns, and Seth Rollins, who would collectively be known as The Shield. All three men would go on to serve as prolific figures in WWE and in the wider professional wrestling industry over the following decade.

== Production ==
=== Background ===
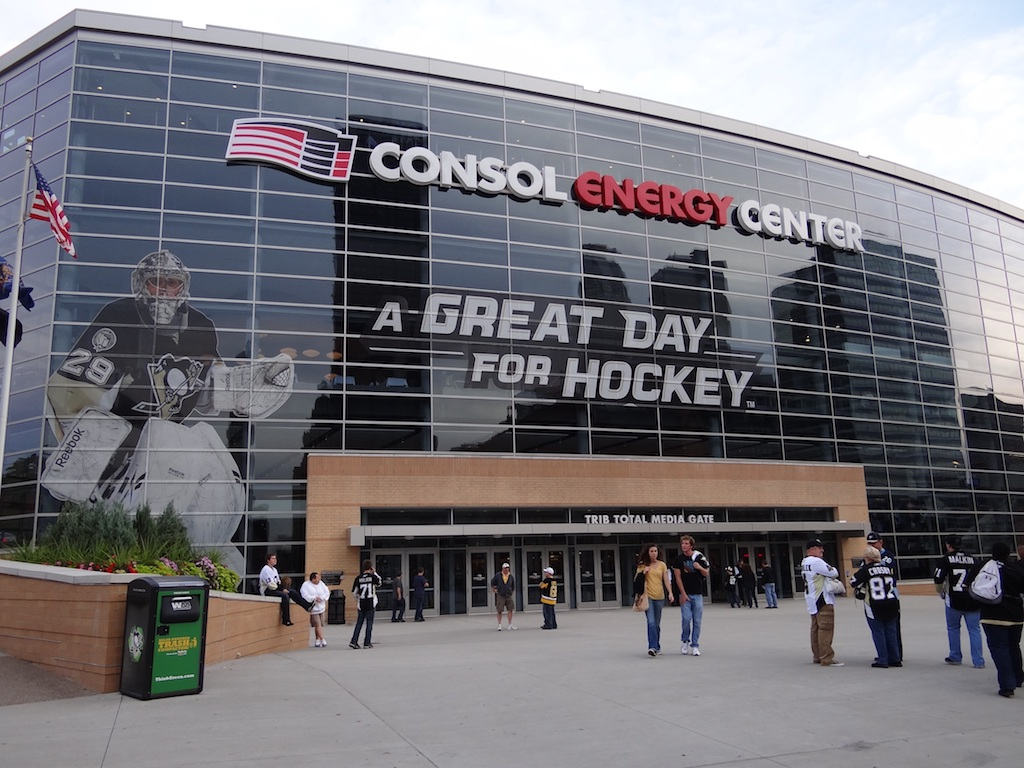
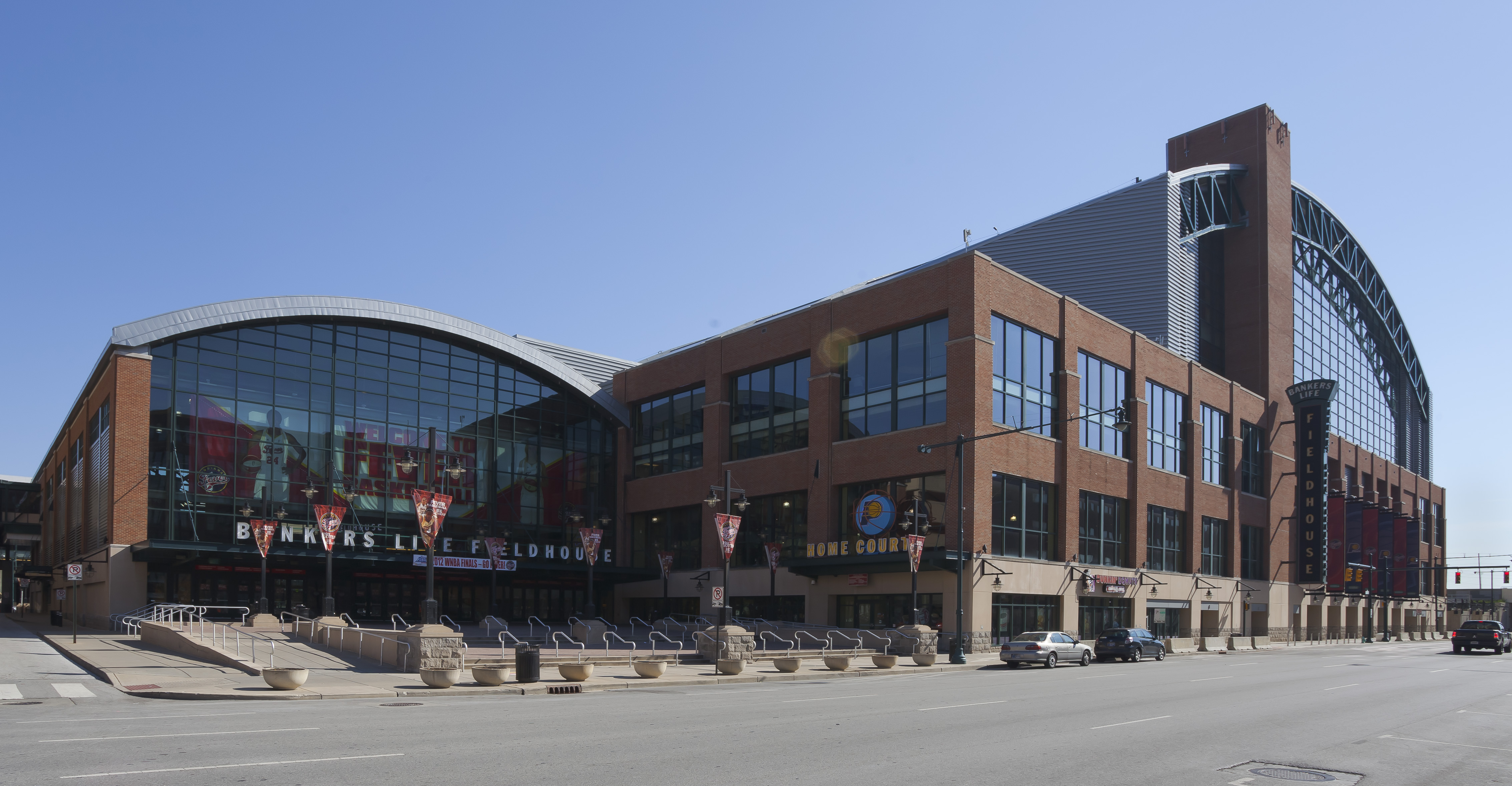
The 26th annual Survivor Series event was originally planned to be held at the Consol Energy Center in Pittsburgh, Pennsylvania, before being relocated to the Bankers Life Fieldhouse in Indianapolis, Indiana.

Survivor Series is an annual professional wrestling pay-per-view (PPV) event, produced every November by WWE since 1987, generally held around Thanksgiving in the United States. In what has become the second longest-running pay-per-view event in history (behind WWE's WrestleMania), it is one of the promotion's original four pay-per-views, along with WrestleMania, SummerSlam, and Royal Rumble, referred to as the "Big Four". The event is traditionally characterized by having Survivor Series matches, which are tag team elimination matches that typically pits teams of four or five wrestlers against each other. The 26th Survivor Series event was scheduled to be held on November 18, 2012.

The 2012 event was originally scheduled to be held at the Consol Energy Center in Pittsburgh, Pennsylvania. However, this booking inadvertently conflicted with the National Football League's schedule for the 2012 season, which pitted the Pittsburgh Steelers against the Baltimore Ravens in a home game that same night. Despite Pittsburgh being a strong WWE market dating from the territorial days of professional wrestling, WWE decided to make no attempts to locally compete against the fanbase of the Steelers (especially since the game was against the team's archrival) and moved Survivor Series to the Bankers Life Fieldhouse in Indianapolis, Indiana, marking the first Survivor Series held in the U.S. state of Indiana. WWE compensated Pittsburgh by having a double Raw and SmackDown taping in December, before giving the city a "Big Four" event with the now-infamous 2014 Royal Rumble.

=== Storylines ===
The event comprised seven matches, including one on the pre-show, that resulted from scripted storylines. Results were predetermined by WWE's writers, while storylines were produced on WWE's weekly television shows, Raw and SmackDown.

On the October 29 episode of Raw, a Survivor Series elimination match between a team managed by Mick Foley, and a team led by CM Punk was scheduled. Originally Punk captained the team which also included The Miz, Cody Rhodes, Damien Sandow, and Alberto Del Rio, whereas Foley's team was to consist of Ryback, Kofi Kingston, Kane, Daniel Bryan, and Randy Orton. The team members were involved in many feuds: Hell in a Cell, Team Rhodes Scholars (Rhodes and Sandow) had unsuccessfully challenged Team Hell No (Kane and Daniel Bryan) for the Tag Team Championship and The Miz had failed to win the Intercontinental Championship from Kingston. Del Rio had also lost to Orton at the event. However, the main feud was between the WWE Champion CM Punk and Ryback. Ryback had lost a title match at Hell in a Cell after the referee Brad Maddox low-blowed him, before a fast count to give Punk the pinfall victory. Ryback then took out his frustration on Punk and Maddox, first press-slamming Maddox out of the ring into the side of the cell, then chasing Punk to the top of the cell, where Ryback caught him and performed his finishing move, Shell Shocked. There were many changes: on the November 5 episode of Raw, The Miz quit the team due to Punk abandoning his team in an attack by Team Foley and was replaced by Wade Barrett, who Paul Heyman had recruited. Furthermore, WWE Chairman Vince McMahon questioned Vickie Guerrero's decision to place Punk in an elimination match instead of letting him defend his title, and forced Vickie Guerrero to remove Punk and Ryback from the elimination match. Dolph Ziggler replaced Punk as captain of the team, which was now renamed Team Ziggler. Ryback's replacement was to be chosen by a Raw active poll, with the choices The Miz, Santino Marella, and Zack Ryder being candidates. Rhodes was replaced by David Otunga at the event due to an injury sustained in the lead-up to the event.

Instead of competing in the Survivor Series elimination match, CM Punk was scheduled to defend his WWE Championship in a triple threat match against Ryback and John Cena, whom Punk had wrestled to a draw at Night of Champions.

Survivor Series also included a rematch from Hell in a Cell between Sheamus and Big Show for the World Heavyweight Championship.

At Night of Champions, Kaitlyn was attacked by an unknown woman moments before she was set to face off against Layla for the WWE Divas Championship, which led to Eve Torres replacing Kaitlyn and winning the title. In the weeks that followed, the evil Aksana was eventually revealed as Kaitlyn's attacker, doing so under Eve's orders. As a result, a Triple Threat Match took place at Hell In A Cell, with Eve defeating Layla and Kaitlyn to retain the title. On the November 12 episode of Raw, Kaitlyn defeated Layla to earn a Divas Championship match at Survivor Series.

Justin Gabriel and Tyson Kidd were initially scheduled to face 3MB (Heath Slater and Jinder Mahal, with Drew McIntyre) in the pre-show available free on YouTube, but were replaced with Team Co-Bro (Santino Marella and Zack Ryder) due to being placed in a different match at the event.

== Event ==
Other on-screen personnel
Role:	Name:
English commentators	Michael Cole
English commentators	Jerry Lawler
English commentators	John Bradshaw Layfield
Pre-show commentators	Scott Stanford
Pre-show commentators	Matt Striker
Spanish commentators	Marcelo Rodríguez
Spanish commentators	Carlos Cabrera
Interviewers	Josh Mathews
Ring announcers	Tony Chimel
Ring announcers	Justin Roberts
Referees	Mike Chioda
Referees	John Cone
Referees	Charles Robinson
Referees	Rod Zapata
Referees	Scott Armstrong
Referees	Darrick Moore
Referees	Chad Patton

=== Pre-show ===
On the pre-show, 3MB (Heath Slater and Jinder Mahal, with Drew McIntyre) faced Team CoBro (Santino Marella and Zack Ryder). Though Ryder was able to execute the Broski Boot and Rough Ryder on Slater, he missed the tag made by Mahal who pinned Ryder resulting in a victory for 3MB.

=== Preliminary matches ===
The main show opened with an unannounced Survivor Series elimination match between the team of Brodus Clay, Tyson Kidd, Justin Gabriel, Rey Mysterio, and Sin Cara and the team of Tensai, Primo & Epico, and The Prime Time Players (Darren Young and Titus O'Neil). Clay was eliminated by Tensai after a Gomennasai. Tensai was eliminated by Gabriel with a Crucifix Pin. O'Neil was eliminated by Kidd with a Roll Up. Epico was eliminated by Kidd after submitting to the Sharpshooter. Primo was eliminated by Mysterio with La Magistral. Young was eliminated by Mysterio after a 619 followed by a Diving Splash, leaving Kidd, Gabriel, Mysterio and Sin Cara as the survivors.

Next, Eve defended the Divas Championship against Kaitlyn. Eve pinned Kaitlyn after the Heart Breaker to win the match.

In the third match, Antonio Cesaro defended the United States Championship against R-Truth. Cesaro pinned R-Truth after a Neutralizer to win the match.

=== Main event matches ===
In the next match, World Heavyweight Champion Big Show was challenged by former champion, Sheamus. The match ended when Big Show intentionally used the referee as a shield, causing Sheamus to inadvertently performed a Brogue Kick on the referee. With Sheamus distracted and attending to the official, Big Show performed the Knockout Punch on Sheamus, after which another referee counted the fall and awarded Big Show the victory. The referee reversed the decision and disqualified Big Show, who nevertheless retained the title. After the match, Big Show argued with the referee John Cone, before Sheamus assaulted Big Show with a chair, and setting up a rematch at next month's TLC pay-per-view.

The fifth match was a Survivor Series match between Team Foley (Randy Orton, The Miz, Kane, Daniel Bryan, and Kofi Kingston, with Mick Foley at ringside) and Team Ziggler (Dolph Ziggler, Wade Barrett, Alberto Del Rio, Damien Sandow, and David Otunga). Sandow was eliminated by Kane after a Chokeslam. Kane was eliminated by Ziggler after a Zig Zag. Otunga was eliminated by Bryan after submitting to the No Lock. Kingston was eliminated by Barrett after a Bull Hammer. Bryan was eliminated by Del Rio after submitting to the Cross Armbreaker. Barrett was eliminated by The Miz after a Skull Crushing Finale. The Miz was eliminated by Del Rio after a Step Up Enziguri on the Top Rope. Del Rio was eliminated by Orton after an RKO. After Orton kicked out of a Zig Zag, Orton attempted to perform a Punt Kick on Ziggler but Ziggler performed a Superkick on Orton to eliminate him, leaving Ziggler as the sole survivor.

The main event of the night was a triple threat match for the WWE Championship between reigning champion CM Punk and challengers Ryback and John Cena. The match came to an end when the debuting trio of Seth Rollins, Dean Ambrose, and Roman Reigns - later known as The Shield - approached the ring from the crowd and triple-powerbombed Ryback through the broadcast table, allowing Punk to retain the title by pinning Cena, who had received a Shell Shock from Ryback. As a result, Punk became only the seventh wrestler in history to hold the WWE Championship consecutively for one full year.

== Results ==
No.	Results	Stipulations	Times
1^{P}	3MB (Heath Slater and Jinder Mahal) (with Drew McIntyre) defeated Team Co-Bro (Santino Marella and Zack Ryder) by pinfall	Tag team match	06:11
2	Brodus Clay, Justin Gabriel, Rey Mysterio, Sin Cara, and Tyson Kidd (with Cameron and Naomi) defeated The Prime Time Players (Darren Young and Titus O'Neil), Primo and Epico, and Tensai (with Rosa Mendes)^{1}	5-on-5 Survivor Series match	18:27
3	Eve Torres (c) defeated Kaitlyn by pinfall	Singles match for the WWE Divas Championship	07:01
4	Antonio Cesaro (c) defeated R-Truth by pinfall	Singles match for the WWE United States Championship	06:57
5	Sheamus defeated Big Show (c) by disqualification	Singles match for the World Heavyweight Championship	14:44
6	Team Ziggler (Alberto Del Rio, Damien Sandow, David Otunga, Dolph Ziggler, and Wade Barrett) (with Ricardo Rodriguez) defeated Team Foley (Daniel Bryan, Kane, Kofi Kingston, The Miz, and Randy Orton) (with Mick Foley)^{2}	5-on-5 Survivor Series match	23:43
7	CM Punk (c) (with Paul Heyman) defeated John Cena and Ryback by pinfall	Triple threat match for the WWE Championship	17:58
(c) / – the champion(s) heading into the match; P / – the match was broadcast on the pre-show

=== Survivor Series matches ===
^1

Eliminated	Wrestler	Eliminated by	Method	Times
1	Brodus Clay	Tensai	Pinfall	8:25
2	Tensai	Justin Gabriel	Pinfall	10:23
3	Titus O'Neil	Tyson Kidd	Pinfall	13:51
4	Epico	Tyson Kidd	Submission	15:02
5	Primo	Rey Mysterio	Pinfall	17:32
6	Darren Young	Rey Mysterio	Pinfall	18:27
Survivor(s):	Rey Mysterio, Sin Cara, Justin Gabriel, and Tyson Kidd			18:27

^2

Eliminated	Wrestler	Eliminated by	Method	Time
1	Damien Sandow	Kane	Pinfall	03:08
2	Kane	Dolph Ziggler	Pinfall	03:47
3	David Otunga	Daniel Bryan	Submission	07:11
4	Kofi Kingston	Wade Barrett	Pinfall	09:43
5	Daniel Bryan	Alberto Del Rio	Submission	12:40
6	Wade Barrett	The Miz	Pinfall	16:05
7	The Miz	Alberto Del Rio	Pinfall	17:14
8	Alberto Del Rio	Randy Orton	Pinfall	21:00
9	Randy Orton	Dolph Ziggler	Pinfall	23:43
Sole Survivor:	Dolph Ziggler (Team Ziggler)			23:43
