= TLC: Tables, Ladders & Chairs (2012) =

WWE pay-per-view event

- Promotional poster featuring Ryback
- Promotion: WWE
- Date: December 16, 2012
- City: Brooklyn, New York
- Venue: Barclays Center
- Attendance: 15,748
- Buy rate: 175,000

Pay-per-view chronology
← Previous; Survivor Series	Next → Royal Rumble

TLC: Tables, Ladders & Chairs chronology
← Previous; 2011	Next → 2013

The 2012 TLC: Tables, Ladders & Chairs was a professional wrestling pay-per-view (PPV) event produced by WWE. It was the fourth annual TLC: Tables, Ladders & Chairs and took place on December 16, 2012, at the Barclays Center in Brooklyn, New York. It was the first professional wrestling event to be held at the Barclays Center and WWE's first event held in Brooklyn. The concept of the show was based around the primary matches of the card each utilizing tables, ladders, and chairs as legal weapons.

Ten matches were contested at the event, with two matches contested on the pre-show. In the main event, Dolph Ziggler defeated John Cena in a Ladder match to retain his Money in the Bank contract for a World Heavyweight Championship match. In other prominent matches, The Shield (Dean Ambrose, Roman Reigns, and Seth Rollins) defeated Ryback and WWE Tag Team Champions Team Hell No (Kane and Daniel Bryan) in a six-man tag team Tables, Ladders, and Chairs match, which was also The Shield's debut match as a stable, and Big Show defeated Sheamus in a Chairs match to retain the World Heavyweight Championship.

The event received 175,000 pay-per-view buys, down from 179,000 buys the previous year.

== Production ==
=== Background ===
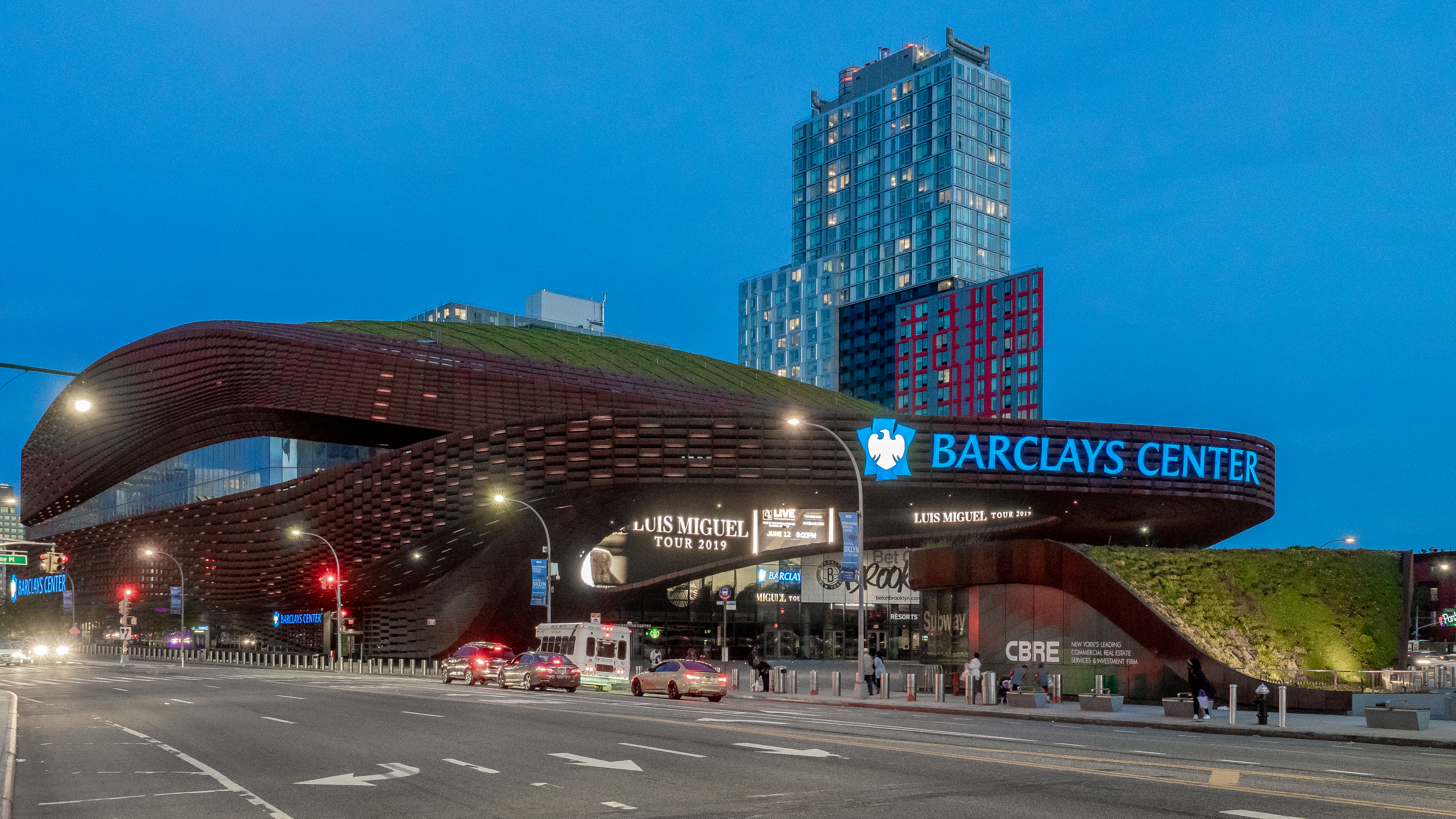
The fourth annual TLC: Tables, Ladders & Chairs was held at the Barclays Center in Brooklyn, New York.

TLC: Tables, Ladders & Chairs was an annual professional wrestling pay-per-view (PPV) event produced every December by WWE since 2009. The concept of the event was based on the primary matches of the card each containing a stipulation using tables, ladders, and chairs as legal weapons, with the main event generally being a Tables, Ladders, and Chairs match. The fourth TLC event was scheduled to take place on December 16, 2012, at Barclays Center in Brooklyn, New York. It would in turn be the first professional wrestling event held at the Barclays Center and subsequently WWE's first event held in Brooklyn. In addition to the event, winners of several categories of the WWE Slammy Awards were announced on the pre-show.

=== Storylines ===
The professional wrestling matches at TLC: Tables, Ladders & Chairs featured professional wrestlers performing as characters in scripted events pre-determined by the hosting promotion, WWE. Storylines were produced on WWE's weekly television shows, Raw and SmackDown.

The major rivalry going into TLC was between the reigning WWE Champion CM Punk and Ryback. Having been denied the title at Hell in a Cell by 'rogue official' Brad Maddox, Ryback along with John Cena competed in a triple threat match for Punk's title at Survivor Series. However, Punk was able to retain the title again when the debuting trio of Dean Ambrose, Seth Rollins, and Roman Reigns interfered and powerbombed Ryback through a table as he was closing in on victory. The trio followed this up by putting Ryback through a table once again the next night on Raw, and, calling themselves The Shield, continued to attack a myriad of superstars over the following weeks including repeated assaults on the WWE Tag Team Champions Team Hell No (Daniel Bryan and Kane), who vowed to put aside the personal differences which had marred their title reign and become united as a result. Having been denied the chance to win the WWE Championship at Survivor Series, Ryback was granted another opportunity at the title in a Tables, Ladders, and Chairs match against Punk. However, the following week during a brawl involving The Shield, Team Hell No and The Miz, Ryback assaulted Punk with a chair and a ladder before powerbombing him through a table. The next day, Punk underwent surgery for a (legit) knee injury, and so was removed from the card. Instead, Ryback would team with Team Hell No against Ambrose, Rollins and Reigns in a six-man tag team TLC match. This match (which was announced via a press release by WWE chairman Vince McMahon) differed from standard TLC matches as it would be decided via pinfall or submission. However, the original TLC match between CM Punk and Ryback was rescheduled for the first Raw of 2013.

On October 28, 2012, at Hell in a Cell, Big Show won the World Heavyweight Championship after defeating Sheamus. The conflict between both men intensified after the match, leading to Big Show's attack on Sheamus and William Regal while the two were visiting an English pub during WWE's European tour. Another fight broke out between the two of them in a parking lot during the November 16 episode of SmackDown. The conflict reached its worst during their rematch at Survivor Series: the Big Show used a referee to shield himself from the Brogue Kick and managed to deliver a knockout punch (WMD) while Sheamus was checking on the downed referee. This foul play ultimately caused the Big Show to be disqualified from the match, thus retaining his title. Shortly after failing to regain the title, Sheamus attacked Big Show with a steel chair while the Big Show pleaded for a cessation of the attacks. Sheamus relented, but followed up the beating by performing his finishing move, the Brogue Kick, on the Big Show. Therefore, a chairs match between Big Show and Sheamus was first announced on the November 23 episode of SmackDown by General Manager Booker T. TLC: Tables, Ladders and Chairs events have been an emotional point for Big Show as he both gained and then lost his title during the last event held in 2011 in a record of 45 seconds, as a result of Bryan Danielson cashing in his Money in the Bank briefcase after Mark Henry knocked out Show post-match.

Leading up to Survivor Series, Wade Barrett replaced The Miz as the final entrant of Team Ziggler, matching up with Kofi Kingston. During the Survivor Series tag team match between Team Foley and Team Ziggler, Barrett managed to pin Kingston and eliminate him. On the November 19 episode of Raw, Barrett defeated Kingston in a non-title match. During the November 26 episode, Barrett was granted a match to vie for Kingston's Intercontinental Championship at the TLC event.

Since October 2012, John Cena was accused of having an inappropriate romantic relationship with AJ Lee during the latter's time as Raw general manager, which newly appointed Raw managing supervisor Vickie Guerrero and Dolph Ziggler were trying to prove, beginning a feud between Cena and Ziggler. During the December 3 episode of Raw, Guerrero (after being coaxed by WWE Chairman Vince McMahon) made a ladder match between Cena and Ziggler for Ziggler's Money in the Bank World Heavyweight Championship match contract at the TLC PPV. It marked the second time Ziggler would defend his contract.

Antonio Cesaro was feuding with R-Truth heading into the pay-per-view after R-Truth unsuccessfully challenged him for the United States Championship at Survivor Series. The weeks building up included them facing off in a six-man tag team match and with Cesaro mocking America on the episode of SmackDown before the show. R-Truth suffered a small knee injury but competed anyway.

== Event ==
Other on-screen personnel
Role:	Name:
English commentators	Michael Cole
English commentators	Jerry Lawler
English commentators	John Bradshaw Layfield
Pre-show commentators	Scott Stanford
Pre-show commentators	Matt Striker
Spanish commentators	Carlos Cabrera
Spanish commentators	Marcelo Rodriguez
Interviewers	The Miz (Miz TV)
Ring announcers	Lilian Garcia
Ring announcers	Justin Roberts
Ring announcers	Tony Chimel (Pre-Show)
Referees	Mike Chioda
Referees	Charles Robinson
Referees	John Cone
Referees	Jack Doan
Referees	Scott Armstrong
Referees	Ryan Tran

In an untelevised match, JTG beat David Otunga by pinfall.

The next match aired on the pre-show. It was a "Santa's Little Helpers" battle royal for the #1 contendership to the Divas Championship between Alicia Fox, Aksana, Naomi, Cameron, Tamina Snuka, Kaitlyn, Layla, Natalya, and Rosa Mendes. Naomi won the match after last eliminating Kaitlyn.

WWE also offered a tribute to the victims of the Sandy Hook Elementary School shooting at the start of the pay-per-view. The audience was prompted to rise as the bell was tolled 26 times in a gesture of respect to the 26 victims of the tragedy, their families, and everyone affected by the events.

=== Preliminary matches ===
The first match was a tables match to determine the #1 contenders for the WWE Tag Team Championship between Team Rhodes Scholars (Damien Sandow and Cody Rhodes) and Rey Mysterio and Sin Cara. In the end, Sin Cara attempted a springboard maneuver, but Rhodes pushed Sin Cara off the ropes, knocking him through a table on the floor, meaning that Rhodes and Sandow won the match.

Next was the United States Championship match between Antonio Cesaro and R-Truth. Cesaro performed a Neutralizer on R-Truth to retain the title.

The Miz came to the ring to host an unannounced episode of "MizTV". 3MB (Heath Slater, Drew McIntyre, and Jinder Mahal) were the guests. They announced that they were going to perform "live" for the first time during the 2012 WWE Slammy Awards. 3MB began mocking Miz and the crowd before mocking the Spanish announce team. Ricardo Rodriguez came to the aid of the Spanish announce team, but was attacked by 3MB. Alberto Del Rio came to Ricardo's aid and attacked 3MB with The Miz. Slater then challenged Miz, Del Rio, and a partner of their choosing to fight 3MB later in the night, which Miz and Del Rio accepted.

The third match was for the Intercontinental Championship between Kofi Kingston and Wade Barrett. In the end, Barrett attempted a Bull Hammer on Kingston, but Kingston ducked and performed Trouble in Paradise on Barrett to retain the title.

In the fourth match, The Shield (Dean Ambrose, Roman Reigns, and Seth Rollins) faced Team Hell No (Kane and Daniel Bryan) and Ryback in a six-man Tables, Ladders and Chairs match. The Shield dominated the early part of the match, isolating one member of the other team and performing a triple powerbomb through an announce table on Ryback. Ambrose and Rollins performed a double superplex off a table, which was positioned on the top rope, on Bryan and attempted the same move on Kane, who countered and performed a flying clothesline on Ambrose. Reigns performed a spear through the barricade on Kane and The Shield buried Kane underneath rubble from the broadcast table and barricade, taking him out of the match. Bryan applied the Yes Lock on each member of The Shield, but each member broke the hold. Ryback recovered, dominated The Shield and executed Shell Shocked on Ambrose, but Rollins and Reigns broke up the pin. As The Shield fought with Ryback on the entrance ramp, Ryback threw Rollins off a ladder through two tables. Back in the ring, Reigns and Ambrose performed an aided powerbomb on Bryan off the top rope and through a table and Reigns pinned Bryan to win the match.

The next match was the WWE Divas Championship match between Eve Torres and Naomi. Eve executed a Heart Breaker on Naomi to win the match.

The chairs match for the World Heavyweight Championship between Big Show and Sheamus followed. Sheamus performed a diving shoulder block with a chair on Big Show and dove off the top rope, but Big Show countered with a spear. Show attacked Sheamus with a chair and performed a chokeslam on Sheamus for a near-fall. Show attempted another chokeslam through two chairs on Sheamus, but Sheamus countered with White Noise through the chairs for a near-fall. Sheamus attempted the Brogue Kick but missed and Big Show executed the Knockout Punch for a near-fall. Big Show hit Sheamus with a large chair to retain the title.

Next was a six-man tag team match between the team of The Miz, Alberto Del Rio, and their surprise partner The Brooklyn Brawler against the 3MB. The Miz performed the Skull-Crushing Finale on Jinder Mahal and tagged in The Brooklyn Brawler. The Brooklyn Brawler forced Mahal to submit to the Boston crab for the win.

=== Main event match ===
In the last match of the night, Dolph Ziggler defended his World Heavyweight Championship Money in the Bank contract against John Cena in a ladder match. Ziggler applied a sleeper hold atop a ladder on Cena, causing Cena and Ziggler to fall off the ladder through a table. Cena applied the STF, causing Ziggler to pass out. Cena attempted an Attitude Adjustment on Ziggler, but Ziggler countered into a Zig Zag. Cena performed a hurricanrana on Ziggler, sending Ziggler through a table. Cena executed an Attitude Adjustment on Ziggler, causing Ziggler to roll out of the ring. Vickie Guerrero then came out and tried to interfere, but AJ stopped her and performed the Five Knuckle Shuffle on Guerrero. Cena climbed the ladder, but suddenly AJ pushed it over, allowing Ziggler to superkick Cena. Ziggler climbed the ladder and retrieved the briefcase to win the match.

== Reception ==
The event received high reviews overall. The six-man tag team TLC match between The Shield against Team Hell No and Ryback received the highest rating of the event by Dave Meltzer, with 4.5 stars out of 5.

== Aftermath ==
The big stories out of this show were the face turn by Alberto Del Rio and the heel turn by AJ Lee. On the New Year's Eve episode of Raw, the champions were allowed to pick their opponents to defend their titles against. Big Show challenged Del Rio's ring announcer, Ricardo Rodriguez, and brutally assaulted him until Del Rio came to Rodriguez's rescue. This resulted in Del Rio challenging for Big Show's World Heavyweight Championship in a Last Man Standing match on the January 11 showing of SmackDown, which Del Rio won. AJ said that she felt that Cena had betrayed her when he told her not to attend his matches, and she turned heel and became the in-story girlfriend of Ziggler.

Ryback ended up getting his title rematch against Punk on the first Raw episode of 2013 in a TLC match, but again failed to capture it due to interference by The Shield. The Rock went on to defeat Punk and end his reign at 434 days at the Royal Rumble.

Kaitlyn received two more opportunities at the Divas Championship, defeating Eve via DQ and countout each time. Kaitlyn finally defeated Eve to capture the Divas Championship on the 20th Anniversary episode of Raw on January 14, 2013, in Kaitlyn's hometown of Houston. Eve quit WWE in an exclusive segment after losing the title.

== Results ==
No.	Results	Stipulations	Times
1^{D}	JTG defeated David Otunga by pinfall	Singles match	3:21
2^{P}	Naomi won by last eliminating Kaitlyn	"Santa's Little Helpers" battle royal for a WWE Divas Championship match later in the night	05:25
3	Team Rhodes Scholars (Cody Rhodes and Damien Sandow) defeated Rey Mysterio and Sin Cara	Tables match to determine #1 contenders to the WWE Tag Team Championship	09:29
4	Antonio Cesaro (c) defeated R-Truth by pinfall	Singles match for the WWE United States Championship	06:40
5	Kofi Kingston (c) defeated Wade Barrett by pinfall	Singles match for the WWE Intercontinental Championship	08:13
6	The Shield (Dean Ambrose, Roman Reigns, and Seth Rollins) defeated Ryback and Team Hell No (Kane and Daniel Bryan) by pinfall	Six-man tag team Tables, Ladders and Chairs match	22:44
7	Eve Torres (c) defeated Naomi by pinfall	Singles match for the WWE Divas Championship	02:58
8	Big Show (c) defeated Sheamus by pinfall	Chairs match for the World Heavyweight Championship	14:17
9	The Brooklyn Brawler, The Miz, and Alberto Del Rio (with Ricardo Rodriguez) defeated 3MB (Drew McIntyre, Heath Slater, and Jinder Mahal) by pinfall	Six-man tag team match	03:23
10	Dolph Ziggler defeated John Cena	Ladder match for Ziggler's World Heavyweight Championship Money in the Bank contract	23:16
(c) / – the champion(s) heading into the match; D / – this was a dark match; P / – the match was broadcast on the pre-show

=== Battle Royal ===
Elimination	Wrestler	Eliminated by	Time
1	Rosa Mendes	Natalya	00:27
2	Cameron	Snuka	01:22
3	Alicia Fox	Aksana	01:30
4	Aksana	Layla	02:02
5	Layla	Snuka	03:32
6	Natalya	Kaitlyn and Naomi	03:46
7	Tamina Snuka	Naomi	04:40
8	Kaitlyn	Naomi	05:47
Winner:	Naomi		
