= TLC: Tables, Ladders & Chairs (2019) =

WWE pay-per-view and livestreaming event

- Promotional poster featuring Bray Wyatt and The Miz
- Promotion: WWE
- Brand(s): Raw; SmackDown
- Date: December 15, 2019
- City: Minneapolis, Minnesota
- Venue: Target Center

WWE event chronology
← Previous; Starrcade	Next → NXT UK TakeOver: Blackpool II

TLC: Tables, Ladders & Chairs chronology
← Previous; 2018	Next → 2020

The 2019 TLC: Tables, Ladders & Chairs was a professional wrestling pay-per-view (PPV) and livestreaming event produced by WWE, held for wrestlers from the promotion's main roster brands, Raw and SmackDown. It was the 11th annual TLC: Tables, Ladders & Chairs and took place on December 15, 2019, at Target Center in Minneapolis, Minnesota. This was the second TLC event held at this venue after the 2017 event. The concept of the show was based around the primary matches of the card each utilizing tables, ladders, and chairs as legal weapons.

Eight matches were contested at the event, including one on the Kickoff pre-show. In the main event, The Kabuki Warriors (Asuka and Kairi Sane) defeated Becky Lynch and Charlotte Flair in a tag team Tables, Ladders, and Chairs (TLC) match to retain the WWE Women's Tag Team Championship, which was also the first time the championship was contested in the main event match of a PPV and livestreaming event, as well as the first women's tag team TLC match. In other prominent matches, Bray Wyatt defeated The Miz, Bobby Lashley defeated Rusev in a tables match, King Corbin defeated Roman Reigns in a TLC match, and in the opening bout, The New Day (Big E and Kofi Kingston) defeated The Revival (Scott Dawson and Dash Wilder) in a ladder match to retain the SmackDown Tag Team Championship.

== Production ==
=== Background ===
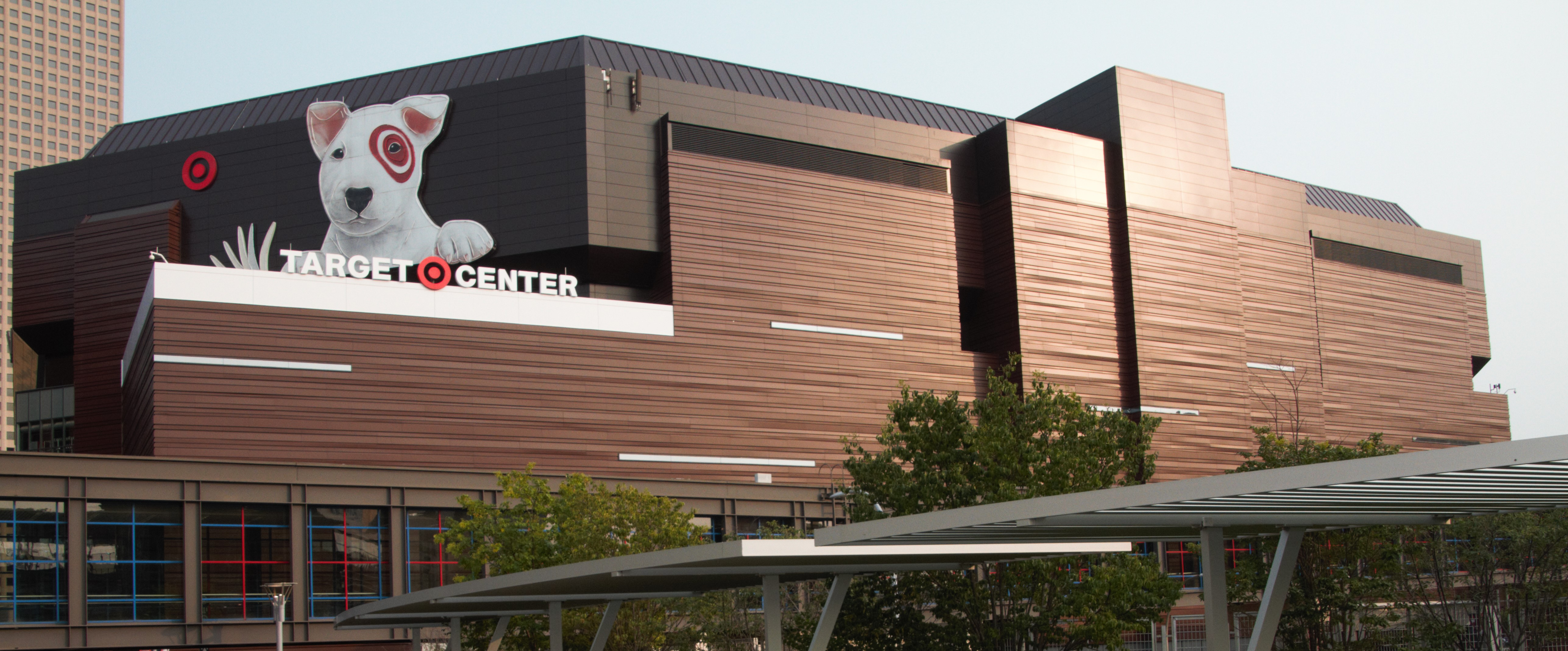
The 11th annual TLC: Tables, Ladders & Chairs was the second time for the event to be held at the Target Center in Minneapolis, Minnesota, after 2017.

TLC: Tables, Ladders & Chairs was an annual professional wrestling event generally produced every December by WWE since 2009. It was originally broadcast exclusively via pay-per-view (PPV) before it began simultaneously livestreaming on the WWE Network in 2014. The concept of the event was based on the primary matches of the card each containing a stipulation using tables, ladders, and chairs as legal weapons, with the main event generally being a Tables, Ladders, and Chairs match. Announced on September 30, 2019, the 11th TLC event was scheduled to be held on December 15 at the Target Center in Minneapolis, Minnesota, marking the second TLC held at this venue, after the 2017 event. It featured wrestlers from the Raw and SmackDown brand divisions. Tickets went on sale on October 11.

=== Storylines ===
The event comprised eight matches, including one on the Kickoff pre-show, that resulted from scripted storylines. Results were predetermined by WWE's writers on the Raw and SmackDown brands, while storylines were produced on WWE's weekly television shows, Monday Night Raw and Friday Night SmackDown.

==== Raw ====
During the women's Survivor Series match, Team Raw captain Charlotte Flair and partner Asuka had an altercation, resulting in Asuka spitting green mist in Flair's face; Asuka walked out of the match while Flair was eliminated. A match between the two occurred on the following night's Raw where Asuka, with some assistance from her tag team partner Kairi Sane, defeated Flair after again spitting green mist in Flair's face. The following week, Flair lost to The Kabuki Warriors (Asuka and Sane) in a handicap match. On the December 9 episode, Flair approached former rival and Raw Women's Champion Becky Lynch and stated that although she did not like Lynch, she disliked The Kabuki Warriors more. Lynch initially rejected Flair and then won a handicap match against The Kabuki Warriors by disqualification, after which, they put Lynch through a table. Later, they attacked Flair backstage and issued a challenge to Lynch and Flair with their WWE Women's Tag Team Championship on the line at TLC. Lynch and Flair accepted the challenge as a Tables, Ladders, and Chairs match, marking the first women's tag team match contested under the stipulation.

On the November 18 episode of Raw, Buddy Murphy went to Aleister Black's locker room to challenge him, but Black was absent and Murphy claimed that Black was all talk and no fight. The following week, Black appeared and attacked Murphy after the latter's match. On the December 2 episode, after watching Black's match from backstage, Murphy was interviewed where he challenged Black once more. The following week, a match between Black and Murphy was scheduled for TLC.

Prior to the 2019 WWE Draft, Rusev, his wife Lana, and Bobby Lashley returned from their hiatus; during the September 30 episode of Raw, Rusev's Universal Championship match ended in a no-contest when Lashley appeared, called out Lana, and proceeded to make out with her. All three were drafted to Raw, and Lashley and Lana continued to torment Rusev with their love affair over the next several weeks. Lana explained that she cheated on Rusev because he had cheated on her first and that he was a sex addict. Divorce papers and a restraining order were eventually issued against Rusev. On the November 25 episode, Rusev violated the restraining order and brutally attacked Lashley, after which, security escorted Rusev out of the building. The following week, Rusev once again violated the restraining order and attacked Lashley, though the security did not attempt to stop him. The security, in turn, arrested Lashley and Lana after Lashley shoved a cop and Lana slapped another. On the December 9 episode, Rusev and Lana signed their divorce papers under the agreement that Rusev received a match against Lashley at TLC, which was made a tables match.

On the December 9 episode of Raw, The Viking Raiders (Erik and Ivar) issued an open challenge for their Raw Tag Team Championship that was answered by The Street Profits (Angelo Dawkins and Montez Ford), who were defeated. The following day on WWE Backstage, it was revealed that The Viking Raiders would have another open challenge at TLC.

On the December 9 episode of Raw, Humberto Carrillo was interviewed backstage when he was interrupted by Andrade. This led to a match later that night where Carrillo was victorious after Andrade argued with his manager Zelina Vega. The day of the event, another rematch was scheduled for the Kickoff pre-show.

==== SmackDown ====
Prior to Survivor Series, a feud began between Roman Reigns and King Corbin. During the men's Survivor Series match, after Corbin had essentially caused the elimination of their Team SmackDown partner Mustafa Ali, team captain Reigns performed a spear on Corbin, which resulted in Corbin's elimination, while Reigns went on to win the match for his team. On the following SmackDown, Reigns called out Corbin, who claimed Team SmackDown won because of him, and stated that Reigns had betrayed his team by attacking him. Reigns challenged Corbin to a match, however, Corbin instead introduced Dolph Ziggler and Robert Roode and Roode challenged Reigns instead, in which Reigns won. Following the match, a brawl ensued. The following week, a Tables, Ladders, and Chairs match between Reigns and Corbin was scheduled for TLC.

On the November 8 episode of SmackDown, The New Day (Big E and Kofi Kingston) defeated The Revival (Scott Dawson and Dash Wilder) to win the SmackDown Tag Team Championship. A rematch occurred the following week, but NXT's The Undisputed Era (Adam Cole, Bobby Fish, Kyle O'Reilly, and Roderick Strong) interfered, causing a no-contest ruling. On the December 6 episode, The Revival won a fatal four-way elimination match to earn a championship rematch at TLC, which was made a ladder match.

At Survivor Series, "The Fiend" Bray Wyatt defeated Daniel Bryan to retain the Universal Championship. On the following SmackDown, Wyatt (as his Firefly Fun House character) challenged Bryan, who was now embracing the "Yes Movement" again, to another match for the title, which Bryan accepted. The Fiend then appeared and attacked Bryan, ripping out his hair. The following week, The Miz, who had been intertwined in the feud, said that Bryan had not been seen since The Fiend's attack and stated that although he and Bryan did not like each other, they were both part of the WWE family, and he would find Bryan. Wyatt interrupted and wanted to "play" with Miz since Bryan had disappeared and wanted to become a part of Miz's family, which enticed Miz to search for Wyatt. Later backstage, Miz found a photo-shopped picture of Miz's family with Wyatt in place of Miz, after which, Wyatt attacked Miz. A non-title match between Miz and Wyatt was then scheduled for TLC, marking Wyatt's first match since his return in April to wrestle as his Firefly Fun House character instead of as The Fiend.

== Event ==
Other on-screen personnel
Role:	Name:
Commentators	Michael Cole (SmackDown)
Commentators	Corey Graves (SmackDown)
Commentators	Vic Joseph (Raw)
Commentators	Jerry Lawler (Raw)
Commentators	Samoa Joe (Raw)
Spanish commentators	Carlos Cabrera
Spanish commentators	Marcelo Rodríguez
German commentators	Carsten Schaefer
German commentators	Tim Haber
German commentators	Calvin Knie
Ring announcers	Greg Hamilton (SmackDown)
Ring announcers	Mike Rome (Raw)
Referees	Danilo Anfibio
Referees	Jason Ayers
Referees	Dan Engler
Referees	Eddie Orengo
Referees	Chad Patton
Referees	Ryan Tran
Referees	Rod Zapata
Interviewers	Charly Caruso
Interviewers	Kayla Braxton
Pre-show panel	Jonathan Coachman
Pre-show panel	Charly Caruso
Pre-show panel	David Otunga
Pre-show panel	Booker T

=== Pre-show ===
During the TLC: Tables, Ladders & Chairs Kickoff pre-show, Humberto Carrillo faced Andrade (accompanied by Zelina Vega). During the match, tensions were mounting between Andrade and Vega due to Andrade's loss to Carrillo on the previous episode of Raw. In the end, Carrillo performed a hurricanrana on Andrade outside the ring and a moonsault on Andrade inside the ring to win the match. Vega tried helping Andrade after the match, but he blew her off.

=== Preliminary matches ===
The actual pay-per-view opened with The New Day (Big E and Kofi Kingston) defending the SmackDown Tag Team Championship against The Revival (Scott Dawson and Dash Wilder) in a tag team ladder match. In the closing moments, Big E performed the Big Ending on Wilder off a ladder. As Dawson ascended the ladder, Kingston intercepted him and attacked Dawson, who fell onto a ladder wedged between the ring ropes. Kingston then unhooked the belts to retain the titles.

Next, Aleister Black faced Buddy Murphy. During the match, Black fell onto the ring steps, after which, Black's nose began to bleed profusely. The end came when Black performed the Black Mass on Murphy to win the match.

After that, Raw Tag Team Champions The Viking Raiders (Erik and Ivar) came out for their open challenge which was answered by The O.C. (Luke Gallows and Karl Anderson). In the end, after Gallows and Anderson sent Erik into the crowd, Ivar performed a suicide dive on them, however, both teams were unable to make it back to the ring, resulting in a double countout, thus The Viking Raiders retained the titles. Following the match, The O.C. attempted to perform The Magic Killer on Erik through a table, only for Ivar to intercept and perform a powerbomb on Anderson through a table.

Backstage, The Miz was interviewed where he mentioned that Bray Wyatt violated the sanctity of his home, that he was fighting as a husband and as a father, and he vowed to destroy Wyatt.

In the fourth match, King Corbin faced Roman Reigns in a Tables, Ladders, and Chairs match. Midway through the match, as Reigns attempted to spear Corbin through a table, Dolph Ziggler appeared and intercepted Reigns with a superkick. Reigns attacked Ziggler, Corbin, and his guards with a kendo stick. The Revival (Scott Dawson and Dash Wilder) then came out and dominated Reigns. Reigns fought back and performed a suicide dive on Corbin, Ziggler, and The Revival. In the end, as Reigns attempted to perform a spear on Corbin, Ziggler threw a chair at Reigns head and performed a Zig-Zag on Reigns followed by The Revival performing a Shatter Machine on Reigns. Corbin then performed The End of Days on Reigns onto a chair to win the match. This marked the last time Reigns lost by pinfall until three and a half years later in July 2023, and by pinfall in singles competition until over four years later in April 2024.

Next, Universal Champion Bray Wyatt faced The Miz in a non-title match. At the start of the match, Wyatt attempted to calm Miz, who instead proceeded to attack Wyatt and dominate him. Throughout the match, Wyatt experienced mood swings and laughed manically, taking pleasure in pain. Outside the ring, Wyatt performed a Sister Abigail on Miz, his first of only two offensive attacks. As Miz narrowly made it back in the ring before the 10 counts, Wyatt performed another Sister Abigail to win the match. Following the match, The Fiend appeared on the TitanTron, prompting Wyatt to obtain his Fiend-themed hammer from under the ring to use on Miz. As Wyatt attempted to attack Miz with the hammer, the lights went out, signaling The Fiend's appearance much to Wyatt's delight, however, a hooded person appeared and performed a running knee on Wyatt. The person was revealed as a returning Daniel Bryan, now with a buzz cut and a shorter beard. Bryan attacked Wyatt and attempted to strike him with the hammer, however, the lights went completely out. When they illuminated, Wyatt was gone.

In the penultimate match, Rusev faced Bobby Lashley (accompanied by Lana) in a tables match. In the end, as Rusev was about to put Lashley through a table, Lana jumped on Rusev's back and Lashley put Rusev through a table to win the match.

Backstage, as The Street Profits (Angelo Dawkins and Montez Ford) were cutting a promo, a brawl broke out involving Roman Reigns, King Corbin, The New Day, The Revival (Scott Dawson and Dash Wilder), and Dolph Ziggler.

=== Main event ===
In the main event, The Kabuki Warriors (Asuka and Kairi Sane) defended the WWE Women's Tag Team Championship against Raw Women's Champion Becky Lynch and Charlotte Flair in a tag team Tables, Ladders, and Chairs match. Sometime during the match, commentator Jerry Lawler noted that the backstage brawl was still occurring. Midway through the main event, The Kabuki Warriors tied Lynch with a rope to a ladder, momentarily keeping her out of the match while they fought Flair, who managed to fight them off and helped loosen the rope around Lynch. As The Kabuki Warriors attacked Flair, Lynch freed herself and attacked them. Outside the ring, Flair put Sane through a table. Soon after, Asuka put Flair through a table with a powerbomb from the ring apron. As Lynch climbed the ladder to retrieve the belts, Asuka tipped the ladder over by pulling the rope that was still tied to the ladder sending Lynch to the outside. Asuka then ascended the ladder and retrieved the belts to retain the titles.

Immediately following the match, the backstage brawl spilled out into the arena and into the crowd, which ended with Roman Reigns performing a spear on King Corbin from an elevated platform on top of the other wrestlers.

== Reception ==
Speaking on his Wrestling Observer Radio show, Dave Meltzer simply said of the show, "It sucked. It was really bad, in a lot of ways." However, he and co-host Bryan Alvarez agreed that the first two matches were "good" before, "It all fell down hill". Alvarez was especially critical of the amount of heel victories on the show, and in particular, The Miz's character work and subsequent lackadaisical offense during his match with Bray Wyatt and that the main event women's tag team TLC match continued for about 10 minutes after it was apparent that Kairi Sane had suffered a head injury, saying the match would not have lost anything had they gone straight to the finish. Both heavily criticized the double countout finish in the Viking Raiders/O.C. match, and called the Reigns/Corbin TLC match "boring".

== Aftermath ==
=== Raw ===
On the following Raw, Raw Women's Champion Becky Lynch was interviewed backstage about her loss. She stated that she had not been herself the past few months and felt that management had been putting her into tag team matches to protect her from facing Asuka in a singles match and likely losing to her. She also stated that she had never defeated Asuka and needed to change that. The following week, Lynch challenged Asuka to a match with her Raw Women's Championship on the line, and Asuka accepted. The match was scheduled for the 2020 Royal Rumble as essentially a rematch from 2019 event.

Lana celebrated Bobby Lashley's win. Lashley then proposed to Lana with Lana stating that her wedding would happen on "Lana Day", mocking Rusev's "Rusev Day" gimmick. During their wedding, Liv Morgan returned, professing her love for Lana, after which, Rusev appeared and attacked Lashley. A rematch between Rusev and Lashley on the January 13, 2020, episode of Raw was again won by Lashley, while an altercation occurred between Lana and Morgan outside the ring. An intergender tag team match pitting Rusev and Morgan and Lashley and Lana was scheduled for the following week, which Lashley and Lana won.

The O.C. (Karl Anderson and Luke Gallows) had a non-title rematch against Raw Tag Team Champions The Viking Raiders (Erik and Ivar) where they were victorious over the champions. The Street Profits (Angelo Dawkins and Montez Ford) then defeated Gallows and Anderson on the December 30 episode, setting up a triple threat tag team championship match on the January 6, 2020, episode where The Viking Raiders retained.

Andrade and Humberto Carrillo were both scheduled to participate in a gauntlet match to determine the number one contender against Rey Mysterio for the United States Championship. Carrillo advanced to the final to face Andrade, who did not appear during his entrance. Andrade instead attacked Carrillo from behind and the gauntlet match ended in a no-contest. Andrade and Zelina Vega were also seemingly on good terms. Andrade then won the US title from Mysterio at a WWE Live event in Madison Square Garden on December 26. After Andrade retained the title against Mysterio in a ladder match on the January 20 episode of Raw, Andrade attempted to perform the Hammerlock DDT on Mysterio on the exposed concrete floor, only for Carrillo to appear to aid Mysterio and fought off Andrade, who retreated along with Vega. Afterwards, a title rematch between Carrillo and Andrade was scheduled for the Royal Rumble.

Aleister Black and Buddy Murphy had two further matches, on the December 30 and January 13 episodes, respectively, where Black was again victorious in each.

=== SmackDown ===
On the following SmackDown, both Daniel Bryan and The Miz stated their desire to take the Universal Championship from "The Fiend" Bray Wyatt due to their respective personal issues with Wyatt. Bryan and Miz were then interrupted by King Corbin, who felt that he deserved an opportunity for the title due to his victory over Roman Reigns at TLC. Later that night, Miz and Bryan defeated Corbin and Dolph Ziggler in the main event. Following the match, it was confirmed that Miz, Bryan, and Corbin would face each other in a triple threat match on the December 27 episode, with the winner receiving a Universal Championship match against The Fiend at the Royal Rumble. Bryan won the match to earn the title match. The match was stipulated as a strap match.

After further feuding on subsequent episodes of SmackDown, including the return of The Usos (Jey Uso and Jimmy Uso), Roman Reigns was scheduled to have a rematch with King Corbin at the Royal Rumble, with both also participating in the Royal Rumble match. The following week, Reigns defeated the returning Robert Roode in a tables match, allowing him to choose the stipulation for his match with Corbin, and he chose a Falls Count Anywhere match.

== Results ==
No.	Results	Stipulations	Times
1^{P}	Humberto Carrillo defeated Andrade (with Zelina Vega) by pinfall	Singles match	12:45
2	The New Day (Big E and Kofi Kingston) (c) defeated The Revival (Scott Dawson and Dash Wilder) by retrieving the championship belts	Ladder match for the WWE SmackDown Tag Team Championship	19:20
3	Aleister Black defeated Buddy Murphy by pinfall	Singles match	13:45
4	The Viking Raiders (Erik and Ivar) (c) vs. The O.C. (Luke Gallows and Karl Anderson) ended in a double countout	Tag team match for the WWE Raw Tag Team Championship	8:30
5	King Corbin defeated Roman Reigns by pinfall	Tables, Ladders, and Chairs match	22:20
6	Bray Wyatt defeated The Miz by pinfall	Singles match	6:40
7	Bobby Lashley (with Lana) defeated Rusev by putting him through a table	Tables match	13:30
8	The Kabuki Warriors (Asuka and Kairi Sane) (c) defeated Becky Lynch and Charlotte Flair by retrieving the championship belts	Tables, Ladders, and Chairs match for the WWE Women's Tag Team Championship	26:00
(c) / – the champion(s) heading into the match; P / – the match was broadcast on the pre-show
