= TLC: Tables, Ladders & Chairs (2014) =

WWE pay-per-view and livestreaming event

- Promotional poster featuring Dolph Ziggler
- Promotion: WWE
- Date: December 14, 2014
- City: Cleveland, Ohio
- Venue: Quicken Loans Arena
- Attendance: 14,000
- Buy rate: 39,000 (excluding WWE Network views)
- Tagline: The Demolition Derby of the WWE

WWE event chronology
← Previous; NXT TakeOver: R Evolution	Next → Royal Rumble

TLC: Tables, Ladders & Chairs chronology
← Previous; 2013	Next → 2015

The 2014 TLC: Tables, Ladders & Chairs, also promoted as TLC: Tables, Ladders, Chairs... and Stairs, was a professional wrestling pay-per-view (PPV) and livestreaming event produced by WWE. It was the sixth annual TLC: Tables, Ladders & Chairs and took place on December 14, 2014, at the Quicken Loans Arena in Cleveland, Ohio. The concept of the show was based around the primary matches of the card each utilizing tables, ladders, and chairs as legal weapons, with this year's event also adding steel stairs.

Eight matches took place at the event, including one on the Kickoff pre-show. The main event saw Bray Wyatt defeat Dean Ambrose in a Tables, Ladders, and Chairs match. In other prominent matches, John Cena defeated Seth Rollins in a tables match to retain his #1 contendership for the WWE World Heavyweight Championship, Ryback defeated Kane in a chairs match, Big Show defeated Erick Rowan in the first-ever steel stairs match, and in the opening bout, Dolph Ziggler defeated Luke Harper in a ladder match to win the WWE Intercontinental Championship. The event also saw the return of Roman Reigns.

This was the first TLC event to livestream on the WWE Network, which launched in February. It was the only TLC event to have the "stairs" annotation added to the title, and it was the first TLC event not to feature a WWE World Heavyweight Championship match. It received 39,000 pay-per-view buys (not including WWE Network viewers), which is the lowest since the introduction of the WWE Network, dramatically down from the previous year's 181,000 buys.

== Production ==
=== Background ===
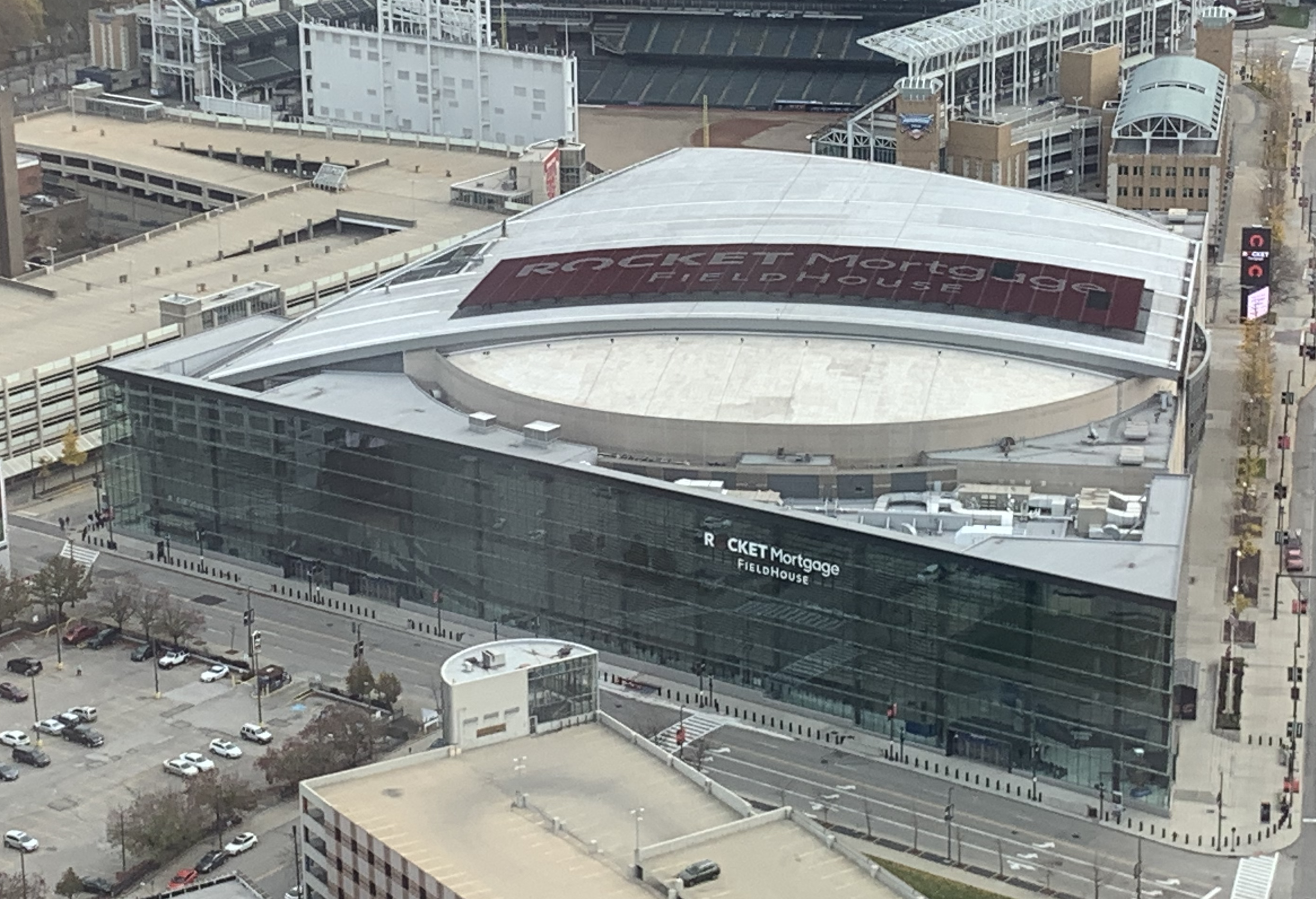
The sixth annual TLC: Tables, Ladders & Chairs was held at the Quicken Loans Arena in Cleveland, Ohio.

TLC: Tables, Ladders & Chairs was an annual professional wrestling pay-per-view (PPV) event produced every December by WWE since 2009. The concept of the event was based on the primary matches of the card each containing a stipulation using tables, ladders, and chairs as legal weapons, with the main event generally being a Tables, Ladders, and Chairs match. The sixth TLC event was also advertised as "TLC: Tables, Ladders, Chairs... and Stairs" due to the event additionally featuring a Steel Stairs match. The event was scheduled to take place on December 14, 2014, at the Quicken Loans Arena in Cleveland, Ohio. In addition to traditional PPV, this was the first TLC event to livestream on the WWE Network, which launched earlier in February that year.

=== Storylines ===
The event comprised nine matches, including one on the Kickoff pre-show, that resulted from scripted storylines. Results were predetermined by WWE's writers, while storylines were produced on WWE's weekly television shows, Raw and SmackDown.

At Survivor Series, Bray Wyatt defeated Dean Ambrose by disqualification when Ambrose hit Wyatt with a chair. After the match, Ambrose drove Wyatt through a table, threw chairs on him and stood on top of a ladder. Shortly afterwards, it was announced that Ambrose would face Wyatt in a Tables, Ladders and Chairs match at TLC.

At Survivor Series, Nikki Bella defeated AJ Lee for the WWE Divas Championship. On the December 8 episode of Raw, it was announced that AJ would invoke her rematch clause to face Nikki for the title at TLC.

On the November 24 episode of Raw, Daniel Bryan returned as a special guest manager and put former Director of Operations Kane in charge of food concessions. Ryback attacked Kane after Kane threw a hot dog at Ryback. On the November 28 episode of SmackDown, Kane attacked Ryback during his match with Seth Rollins and attacked Ryback with a chair after the match. Later in the night, Bryan (who was also the guest manager that night) announced that Ryback would face Kane in a chairs match at TLC.

On the December 1 episode of Raw, Seth Rollins attempted to persuade John Cena to bring The Authority back into power, but they were interrupted by the Anonymous Raw General Manager, who announced that Cena and Rollins would face off in a tables match at TLC and added that if Cena loses, he would no longer be the #1 contender for the WWE World Heavyweight Championship.

On the December 1 episode of Raw, The Usos (Jey Uso and Jimmy Uso) won a tag team turmoil match to face The Miz and Damien Mizdow for the WWE Tag Team Championship at TLC.

At Survivor Series, Big Show turned on Team Cena by knocking out John Cena during their match, prompting Seth Rollins to pin and eliminate Cena. On the following episode of Raw, Team Cena member Erick Rowan confronted Big Show and attacked him. On the December 1 episode of Raw, Rowan defeated Big Show by disqualification after Big Show attacked Rowan with steel steps, but later in the show, Rowan would knock out Big Show with steel steps with the help of Cena, Dolph Ziggler, and Ryback. On the December 2 episode of Main Event, it was announced that Rowan would face Big Show in a Steel Stairs match at TLC. Additionally, the PPV was renamed "TLC: Tables, Ladders, Chairs...and Stairs" in recognition of the stairs match.

On the November 17 episode of Raw, Luke Harper defeated Dolph Ziggler to win the Intercontinental Championship with the help of Seth Rollins, Jamie Noble and Joey Mercury. After Survivor Series, Harper would be forced to defend the title against Ziggler on the November 28 and December 5 episodes of SmackDown, but Harper would lose via countout and disqualification respectively to retain the title. After Harper retained the title for the second time against Ziggler, Harper attempted to attack Ziggler with a ladder, but Ziggler countered and attacked Harper, prompting Santino Marella to announce a ladder match between the two for the title at TLC.

On the November 28 episode of SmackDown, The New Day (Big E, Kofi Kingston, and Xavier Woods) made their debut. On the December 1 episode of Raw, Big E and Kingston eliminated Gold and Stardust from the Tag Team Turmoil match, but Gold and Stardust later distracted The New Day and caused them to be eliminated from the bout. On the December 8 episode of Raw, it was announced that Big E and Kingston would face Gold and Stardust on the TLC Kickoff Show.

On the December 1 episode of Raw, Jack Swagger found his mentor, Zeb Colter, beaten up in a corridor. United States Champion Rusev admitted to have attacked Colter, which resulted in Swagger attacking Rusev. On the December 8 episode of Raw, it was announced that Rusev would defend the championship against Swagger at TLC.

== Event ==
Other on-screen personnel
Role:	Name:
English commentators	Michael Cole
English commentators	Jerry Lawler
English commentators	John "Bradshaw" Layfield
Spanish commentators	Carlos Cabrera
Spanish commentators	Marcelo Rodriguez
Interviewer	Byron Saxton
Ring announcers	Lillian Garcia
Ring announcers	Eden Stiles
Referees	Mike Chioda
Referees	Rod Zapata
Referees	Dan Engler
Referees	Jason Ayers
Referees	Ryan Tran
Referees	Chad Patton
Pre-show Panel	Renee Young
Pre-show Panel	Booker T
Pre-show Panel	Alex Riley
Pre-show Panel	Paul Heyman

=== Pre show ===
The TLC: Tables, Ladders, Chairs... and Stairs Kickoff pre-show included the Kickoff panel of Renee Young, Booker T, Paul Heyman, and Alex Riley previewing the matches. Also on the Kickoff show, The New Day (Big E and Kofi Kingston) (accompanied by Xavier Woods) took on Gold and Stardust in a tag team match. In the end, Big E and Kingston performed the Midnight Hour on Stardust to win the match.

=== Preliminary matches ===
The actual pay-per-view opened with Luke Harper defending the Intercontinental Championship against Dolph Ziggler in a ladder match. During the match, Harper performed a Catapult Hangman into a Ladder on Ziggler, causing Ziggler to bleed. Harper pulled Ziggler off a ladder but Ziggler performed a DDT on Harper. Ziggler attacked Harper with a ladder, causing Harper to fall onto a ladder bridged between the ring apron and a broadcast table. In the end, Harper climbed a ladder but Ziggler performed a Superkick on Harper, causing Harper to fall off the ladder. Ziggler retrieved the belt to win the title.

Next, The Miz and Damien Mizdow defended the WWE Tag Team Championship against The Usos. The match ended when The Miz hit Jimmy with a Slammy Award, resulting in The Usos winning due to disqualification.

After that, Erick Rowan faced Big Show in a steel stairs match. The end came when Big Show performed a Chokeslam onto the steel stairs on Rowan, followed by a KO Punch. Big Show used the steel stairs to pin Rowan for the victory.

In the fourth match, John Cena faced Seth Rollins in a tables match. During the match, Jamie Noble and Joey Mercury repeatedly interfered in the match. Cena attacked Rollins, Noble and Mercury with a metal barrier, performing a Suplex onto the metal barrier on Noble. Rollins and Mercury ran towards Cena with a table but Cena moved, causing the table to break against the ring post, and performed an Attitude Adjustment on Mercury into the timekeeper's area. Whilst Cena fought with Rollins, the referee was knocked down. Cena performed a Super Attitude Adjustment through a table on Rollins, but as the referee was down, Noble and Mercury were able to remove the broken table. Cena took out Noble and Mercury with a double Attitude Adjustment through a table. After Rollins and Cena both fell through tables, the match was restarted. Cena performed an Attitude Adjustment onto a broadcast table on Rollins but the table did not break. Big Show came down to the ring, attacking Cena until Roman Reigns made his return and came down to the ring, attacking Big Show. Reigns executed a Spear through a table on Big Show and a Superman Punch on Rollins. Cena performed an Attitude Adjustment on Rollins through the table to win the match.

Next, Nikki Bella (accompanied by her sister, Brie Bella) defended the WWE Divas Championship against AJ Lee. In the end, Nikki sprayed Lee with an unknown substance whilst Brie distracted the referee. Nikki executed a Rack Attack on Lee to retain the title.

After that, Ryback faced Kane in a chairs match. The match ended when Ryback executed Shell Shocked on Kane for the victory.

In the penultimate match, Rusev defended the United States Championship against Jack Swagger. Rusev forced Swagger to submit to The Accolade to retain the title.

=== Main event ===
In the main event, Dean Ambrose faced Bray Wyatt in a Tables, Ladders, and Chairs match. At the start of the match, Ambrose used kendo sticks and chairs to attack Wyatt. Ambrose climbed to the top rope but Wyatt attacked Ambrose, causing him to fall through a table. Wyatt hit Ambrose with a piece of the table and pinned Ambrose for a near-fall. Wyatt performed a running senton on Ambrose while he was lying on a ladder for a near-fall. Ambrose executed a guillotine leg drop onto a chair on Wyatt for a near-fall. Ambrose and Wyatt fought up the entrance ramp, where Ambrose put Wyatt through two tables in succession with diving elbow drops off a ladder. Wyatt performed a Sister Abigail on Ambrose for a near-fall. Ambrose performed a Dirty Deeds on Wyatt for a near-fall. Ambrose put Wyatt through a broadcast table with a diving elbow drop off a ladder. In the end, Ambrose retrieved a TV monitor, but it exploded, blinding Ambrose. Wyatt took advantage of this and executed another Sister Abigail on Ambrose to win the match.

== Aftermath ==
The following night on Raw, guest general manager Chris Jericho made a rematch between John Cena and Seth Rollins in a Steel Cage Match. Near the end of the match, Brock Lesnar returned and attacked Cena, resulting in Rollins winning the match by walking out of the cage. On SmackDown, Rollins revealed that he orchestrated the attack. The next episode of Raw, another rematch of the two took place, with Cena winning. On the December 29 episode of Raw, hosted by Edge and Christian, Rollins threatened Edge's neck (which was at a high risk of fracture that could lead to potential paralysis) unless Cena gave in and brought The Authority back, which Cena did in order to protect Edge. Big Show and Rollins attacked Cena, after which The Authority came out to celebrate. Also on December 29, Daniel Bryan returned to talk about his future in WWE. Although he teased the idea that his career may be over, he instead announced he was medically cleared to compete again, and declared he would participate in the Royal Rumble.

On the January 5 episode of Raw, The Authority booked a two out of three falls match for the Intercontinental Championship, which saw Dolph Ziggler lose the championship to Bad News Barrett. Also, Erick Rowan lost his match against Luke Harper and Ryback was defeated by Rollins and Kane in a handicap match. By the end of the episode, Ziggler, Ryback, and Rowan were all fired due to their involvement in Team Cena at Survivor Series. On the January 19 episode of Raw, John Cena, with the help of Sting, defeated Big Show, Kane and Seth Rollins to get the jobs of Ziggler, Ryback, and Rowan back.

== Results ==
No.	Results	Stipulations	Times
1^{P}	The New Day (Big E and Kofi Kingston) (with Xavier Woods) defeated Goldust and Stardust by pinfall	Tag team match	11:40
2	Dolph Ziggler defeated Luke Harper (c)	Ladder match for the WWE Intercontinental Championship	16:40
3	The Usos (Jey Uso and Jimmy Uso) defeated The Miz and Damien Mizdow (c) by disqualification	Tag team match for the WWE Tag Team Championship	7:17
4	Big Show defeated Erick Rowan by pinfall	Steel Stairs match	11:14
5	John Cena defeated Seth Rollins (with Jamie Noble and Joey Mercury)	Tables match for Cena's #1 contendership for the WWE World Heavyweight Championship	21:35
6	Nikki Bella (c) (with Brie Bella) defeated AJ Lee by pinfall	Singles match for the WWE Divas Championship	7:38
7	Ryback defeated Kane by pinfall	Chairs match	9:50
8	Rusev (c) (with Lana) defeated Jack Swagger by submission	Singles match for the WWE United States Championship	4:50
9	Bray Wyatt defeated Dean Ambrose by pinfall	Tables, Ladders, and Chairs match	26:58
(c) / – the champion(s) heading into the match; P / – the match was broadcast on the pre-show
