= NXT TLC: Tables, Ladders & Chairs (2026) =

WWE professional wrestling event

- Promotion: WWE
- Brand: NXT
- Date: December 12, 2026
- City: Orlando, Florida
- Venue: WWE Performance Center

WWE event chronology
← Previous; Wrestlepalooza	Next → Worlds Collide: Doomsday

TLC: Tables, Ladders & Chairs chronology
← Previous; 2020	Next → —

NXT major events chronology
← Previous; Halloween Havoc	Next → Stand & Deliver

The 2026 NXT TLC: Tables, Ladders & Chairs, also promoted as NXT TLC: Tables, Ladders & Chairs Orlando, is an upcoming professional wrestling premium live event (PLE) and television special produced by WWE, to be held for wrestlers from the promotion's developmental brand, NXT. It will be NXT's first TLC: Tables, Ladders & Chairs, and WWE's 13th overall, and is scheduled to take place on Saturday, December 12, 2026, at NXT's home venue, the WWE Performance Center in Orlando, Florida. The concept of the show is based around the primary matches of the card each utilizing tables, ladders, and chairs as legal weapons.

TLC was previously held as an annual event for WWE's main roster from 2009 to 2020, making this the first TLC event since 2020, subsequently being the first to be branded as a "premium live event", a term the company introduced at the start of 2022 to refer to its events airing on traditional pay-per-view (PPV) and via WWE's livestreaming platforms. The event will be simulcast on The CW's linear channel and ESPN Unlimited in the United States, as well as Netflix in most international markets, marking the first TLC event to broadcast on these services. The event will be held on the same day as the main roster's PLE, Wrestlepalooza, which will air earlier in the day from Australia in Perth, Western Australia.

== Production ==
=== Background ===
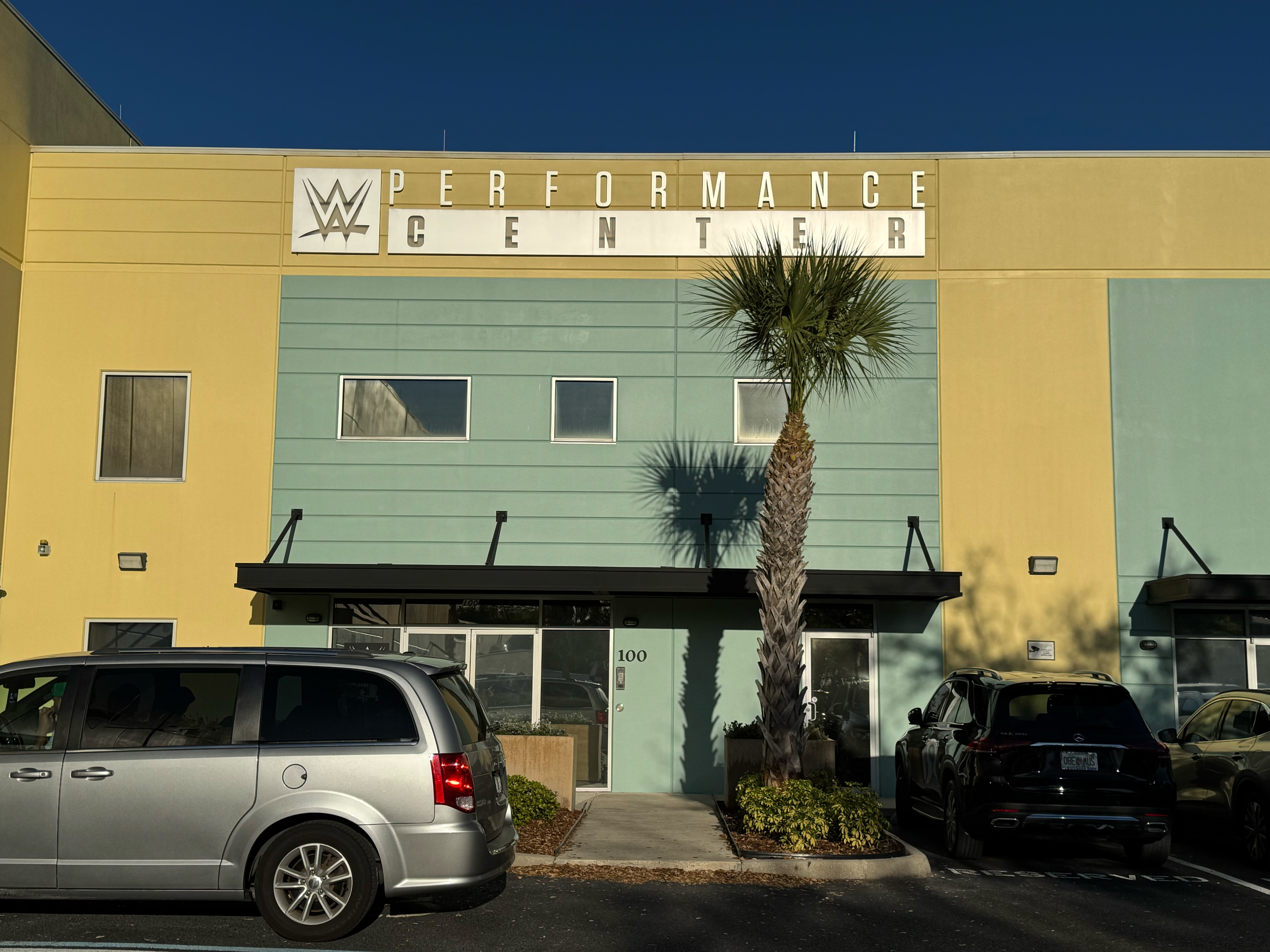
NXT's first TLC: Tables, Ladders & Chairs, and WWE's 13th overall, will be held at the brand's home venue, the WWE Performance Center in Orlando, Florida.

TLC: Tables, Ladders & Chairs was previously an annual professional wrestling event established by WWE, held for its main roster from 2009 to 2020, generally in December. It was originally broadcast exclusively via pay-per-view (PPV) before it began simultaneously livestreaming on WWE's former platform, the WWE Network, in 2014. The concept of the event was based on the primary matches of the card each containing a stipulation using tables, ladders, and chairs as legal weapons, with the main event generally being a Tables, Ladders, and Chairs match. It was discontinued after the 2020 event as although a 2021 event was planned, it was canceled in favor of Day 1 that took place on New Year's Day 2022.

On October 31, 2026, at Halloween Havoc, it was announced that after six years, TLC: Tables, Ladders & Chairs would be reinstated as a premium live event (PLE) for WWE's developmental brand, NXT. The brand's first TLC event, and WWE's 13th overall, was scheduled to take place on Saturday, December 12, 2026, at NXT's home venue, the WWE Performance Center in Orlando, Florida. The event was in turn promoted as NXT TLC: Tables, Ladders & Chairs Orlando and it will take place the same day as the main roster's PLE, Wrestlepalooza, which will air earlier in the day from Australia in Perth, Western Australia. This also replaces NXT's previously annual December PLE, Deadline. This will subsequently be the first TLC to be branded as a PLE, a term the company introduced on January 1, 2022, to refer to its events that are available on PPV and via WWE's livestreaming platforms.

=== Broadcast outlets ===
In the United States, the event will be broadcast as a television special on The CW's linear channel, marking the first TLC event on The CW as NXT's PLEs began broadcasting on the channel in June after WWE's contract with Peacock for NXT's events expired in March. Additionally, ESPN announced a deal with The CW in which CW Sports, including all of NXT's programming, would be simulcast on both The CW and ESPN Unlimited beginning in August—ESPN Unlimited had already been broadcasting WWE's main roster PLEs since September 2025. As a result, this will also be the first TLC event on ESPN Unlimited.

Outside of the United States, the event will air on SuperSport in Sub-Saharan Africa and Netflix everywhere else. This subsequently marks the first TLC event to air on Netflix after the WWE Network in international locations, as well as countries that were on different platforms, merged under Netflix, a process that began in January 2025 with all but Sub-Saharan Africa on Netflix by October 2026.

=== Storylines ===
The event will include matches that results from scripted storylines. Results will be predetermined by WWE's writers on the NXT brand, while storylines are produced on WWE's weekly television program, NXT.

== Matches ==
No.	Matches*	Stipulations
1	Grayson Waller (c) vs. Mason Rook or Shiloh Hill	Singles match for the NXT Championship
(c) / – the champion(s) heading into the match; *Card subject to change
