= Wrestlepalooza (2026) =

WWE premium live event

- Promotion: WWE
- Brands: Raw; SmackDown
- Date: December 12, 2026
- City: Perth, Western Australia, Australia
- Venue: RAC Arena

WWE event chronology
← Previous; Survivor Series: WarGames	Next → NXT TLC: Tables, Ladders & Chairs

Wrestlepalooza chronology
← Previous; 2025	Next → —

WWE in Australia chronology
← Previous; Crown Jewel	Next → —

The 2026 Wrestlepalooza, also promoted as Wrestlepalooza: Perth, is an upcoming professional wrestling premium live event (PLE) produced by WWE, to be held for wrestlers from the promotion's main roster brands, Raw and SmackDown. It will be WWE's second annual Wrestlepalooza, and the sixth Wrestlepalooza overall, and is scheduled to take place on Saturday, December 12, 2026, at RAC Arena in Perth, Western Australia, Australia. The event will be held the same day as WWE's NXT TLC: Tables, Ladders & Chairs, airing later in the day from the United States in Orlando, Florida.

== Production ==
=== Background ===
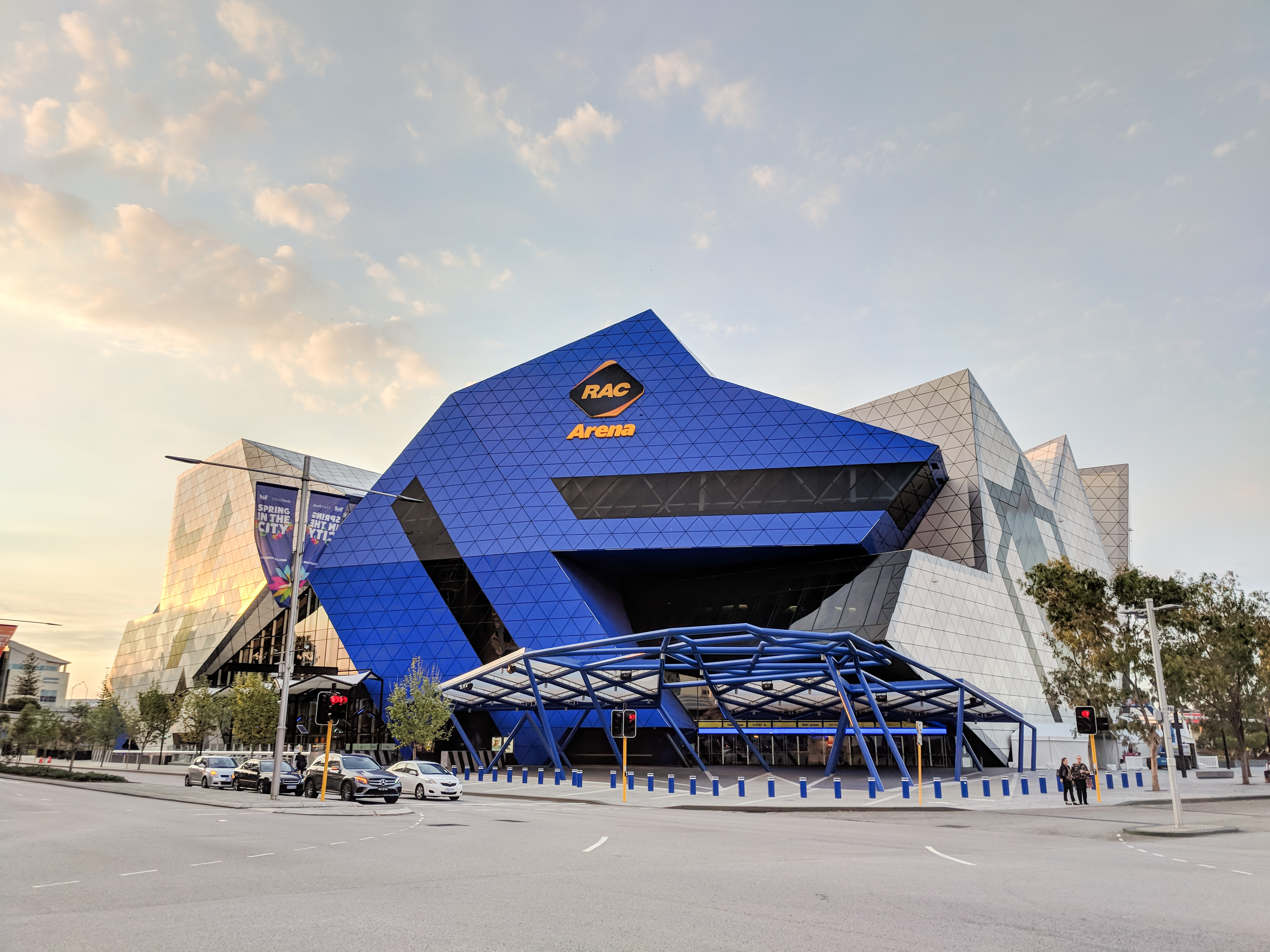
WWE's second annual Wrestlepalooza, and the sixth overall, will be held at RAC Arena in Perth, Western Australia, Australia.

Wrestlepalooza was the name of a professional wrestling event produced by the former Extreme Championship Wrestling (ECW) that was held in 1995, 1997, 1998, and 2000—the 1998 iteration aired on pay-per-view (PPV) while the others were live events partially syndicated across television. In 2003, WWE acquired the assets of ECW from bankruptcy, and over 20 years later, WWE reinstated Wrestlepalooza as its own premium live event (PLE) in 2025.

On August 27, 2026, WWE announced that it had entered a three-year partnership with Tourism Western Australia to have Perth, the capital of Western Australia, host annual "WWE Weekend Takeovers" that include a main roster PLE for Raw and SmackDown and tapings of the brands' respective weekly shows, Monday Night Raw and Friday Night SmackDown, from 2026 to 2028, as well as various other events in the city, such as merchandise stores and meet-and-greets. The first weekend takeover was announced for December 2026, which would include WWE's second annual Wrestlepalooza, and the sixth overall, at the RAC Arena on Saturday, December 12, with the December 11 and 14 episodes of SmackDown and Raw, respectively, held at the same venue. The event was in turn promoted as Wrestlepalooza: Perth, and will take place on the same day as WWE's NXT TLC: Tables, Ladders & Chairs, airing later in the day from the United States in Orlando, Florida. Ticket combo-packs for all three events went on sale on September 10, while individual tickets went on sale on September 30.

=== Broadcast outlets ===
The PLE will be broadcast on traditional PPV outlets worldwide. It will also be available to livestream on ESPN Unlimited in the United States, SuperSport in Sub-Saharan Africa, and Netflix everywhere else.

=== Storylines ===
The event will include matches that result from scripted storylines. Results are predetermined by WWE's writers on the Raw and SmackDown brands, while storylines are produced on WWE's weekly television programs, Monday Night Raw and Friday Night SmackDown.

== See also ==
- WWE in Australia
- Professional wrestling in Australia
