= Wrestlepalooza (1995) =

1995 Extreme Championship Wrestling supercard event

- The ECW Arena.
- Promotion: Extreme Championship Wrestling
- Date: August 5, 1995 (aired August 15 and 22, 1995)
- City: Philadelphia, Pennsylvania, United States
- Venue: ECW Arena
- Attendance: 1,150

Event chronology
← Previous; Heat Wave	Next → Gangstas Paradise

Wrestlepalooza chronology
← Previous; First	Next → 1997

Wrestlepalooza, the first Wrestlepalooza professional wrestling event produced by Extreme Championship Wrestling (ECW), took place on August 5, 1995 at the ECW Arena in Philadelphia, Pennsylvania in the United States.

Eight professional wrestling matches were contested at the event. The main event was a stretcher match, in which The Gangstas (New Jack and Mustafa) defeated The Public Enemy (Rocco Rock and Johnny Grunge). On the undercard, Mikey Whipwreck defeated The Sandman in a Singapore cane match, 2 Cold Scorpio, Dean Malenko and Cactus Jack defeated Eddie Guerrero and The Steiner Brothers (Rick Steiner and Scott Steiner) in a six-man tag team match and Raven, Stevie Richards and The Dudley Brothers (Big Dick Dudley and Dudley Dudley) defeated Tommy Dreamer, Cactus Jack and The Pitbulls (Pitbull #1 and Pitbull #2) in an eight-man tag team match.

Four matches from Wrestlepalooza were aired in syndication on the August 15 and August 22, 1995 episodes of ECW Hardcore TV. The six-man tag team match was included on the 2013 compilation DVD ECW Unreleased Vol. 2.

== Background ==
The event featured wrestlers from pre-existing scripted feuds and storylines. Wrestlers portrayed villains, heroes, or less distinguishable characters in the scripted events that built tension and culminated in a wrestling match or series of matches played out on ECW's television program Hardcore TV.

The Gangstas (New Jack and Mustafa) debuted in ECW at Barbed Wire, Hoodies & Chokeslams, where they attacked The Public Enemy (Rocco Rock and Johnny Grunge). This led to a feud between Public Enemy and Gangstas as both teams exchanged wins at the Hardcore Heaven and Heat Wave events.

On the August 1 episode of Hardcore TV, Mikey Whipwreck won a battle royal to earn a title shot at The Sandman's ECW World Heavyweight Championship, which he received later in the main event. Sandman defeated Whipwreck to retain the title and then caned him seven times to injure him despite the referee's constant warnings, leading to a Singapore cane match between Whipwreck and Sandman at Wrestlepalooza.

At Hardcore Heaven, The Pitbulls (Pitbull #1 and Pitbull #2) left Raven's Nest by refusing to follow Raven's orders of superbombing Luna Vachon and they attacked their leader Raven instead. Pitbulls formed an alliance with Raven's rival Tommy Dreamer as the two teams defeated Raven and The Dudley Brothers (Snot Dudley and Dudley Dudley) at Heat Wave. On the July 25 episode of Hardcore TV, Raven's Nest attacked Pitbulls after their match until Luna Vachon and Dreamer made the save.

At Heat Wave, 2 Cold Scorpio and Dean Malenko defeated Eddie Guerrero and Taz in a tag team match. The two teams faced in a rematch on the July 25 episode of Hardcore TV, which Guerrero and Taz won. However, Taz broke his neck in the process and was put out of action. On the August 1 episode of Hardcore TV, The Steiner Brothers (Rick Steiner and Scott Steiner) made their ECW debut alongside Taz and it was announced that Taz and Steiner Brothers would compete against Scorpio, Malenko and Chris Benoit in a six-man tag team match at Wrestlepalooza.

== Event ==
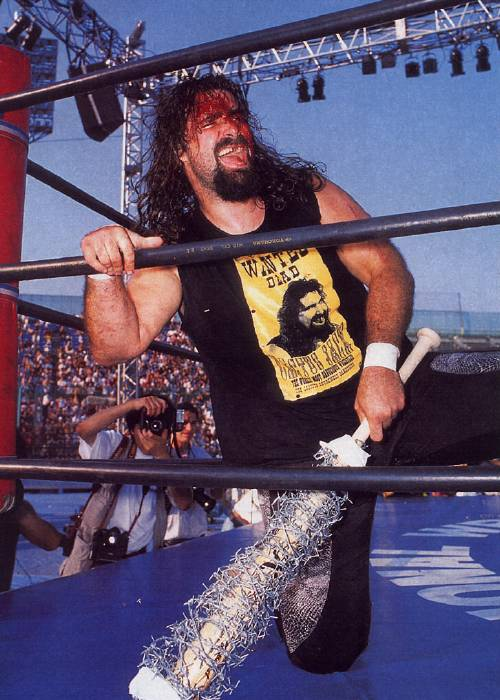
Cactus Jack turned heel at Wrestlepalooza.

The opening bout was a singles match between Hack Meyers and J.T. Smith. During the match, Smith attempted to perform a suicide dive out of the ring onto Meyers on the arena floor below, only for his knee pads to catch on the ring ropes, causing him to botch the move and fall head-first to the ground, drawing chants of "you fucked up" from the characteristically unsympathetic ECW audience. Smith suffered a concussion, with a large swelling on his head. Smith went on to defeat Meyers by pinfall following interference by Val Puccio.

The second bout was a singles match between Val Puccio and Tony Stetson. Puccio won by disqualification after Hack Meyers interfered in the match.

The third bout saw Raven's Nest (Raven, Stevie Richards, Dudley Dudley, and Big Dick Dudley (substituting for Snot Dudley, who was injured) face Tommy Dreamer, The Pitbulls, and Cactus Jack (substituting for Luna Vachon, who had been unable to travel to the event) in an eight-man tag team match. At the beginning of the match, Raven gave a promo in which he professed to understand Cactus Jack's "pain". Towards the end of the match, Dreamer seemed to be on the brink of defeating Raven for the first time after giving him a piledriver onto a steel chair, only for Cactus Jack to turn on Dreamer by giving him a double arm DDT, and pulling Raven on top of him for a pinfall victory.

The fourth bout was a six-man tag team match pitting 2 Cold Scorpio and Dean Malenko, and Cactus Jack (substituting for Chris Benoit, who had left ECW due to visa issues) against The Steiner Brothers and Eddie Guerrero (substituting for Taz, who was injured). After a back-and-forth match, Guerrero attempted to perform a brainbuster on Malenko but Malenko countered with a roll-up, pinning Guerrero.

The fifth bout was a Singapore cane match between Mikey Whipwreck and The Sandman (the then-ECW World Heavyweight Champion). Whipwreck performed a diving crossbody on Sandman to win the match. After the match, The Sandman refused to take the lashes with the cane until the referee threatened to strip him of his Championship if he did not cooperate. After The Sandman's valet Woman tried to convince him to take the lashes, he took several lashes from Whipwreck before attacking him and caning him until The Public Enemy came to the ring and chased off The Sandman.

The main event was a stretcher match between The Public Enemy and The Gangstas. The Sandman interfered in the match and attacked Rocco Rock, leading to The Gangstas winning the match. After the match, Mikey Whipwreck came to the ring and caned The Sandman.

== Aftermath ==
The involvement of The Sandman in Public Enemy's match against The Gangstas resulted in Mikey Whipwreck forming an alliance with Public Enemy to feud with Sandman and The Gangstas. The two teams competed in the titular Gangstas Paradise steel cage match at Gangstas Paradise.

The Pitbulls and Raven's Nest continued their rivalry as Raven and Stevie Richards defended the ECW World Tag Team Championship against Pitbulls in a two-out-of-three falls dog collar match at Gangstas Paradise.

Cactus Jack's betrayal of Tommy Dreamer led to the two men entering a rivalry against each other which carried on for the next few months, culminating in a tag team match where Dreamer teamed with Terry Funk to take on Jack and Raven at November to Remember.

Eddie Guerrero and Dean Malenko continued their feud after the event. On the August 8 episode of Hardcore TV, Guerrero defeated Malenko to capture the ECW World Television Championship. He would lose the title to 2 Cold Scorpio at a live event on August 25. On the August 29 episode of Hardcore TV, Guerrero and Malenko competed in a two out of three falls match, which ended in a draw. This was their farewell match as they left ECW to jump ship to World Championship Wrestling (WCW).

J.T. Smith was legitimately injured and was absent for several weeks. Upon his return, Smith adopted a comic persona in which he had sustained mild brain damage from the concussion, causing him to believe he was an Old World Italian and speak with an Italian accent (ultimately leading to the formation of The Full Blooded Italians). Smith also began intentionally botching moves for the amusement of the ECW audience. At Gangstas Paradise, Smith faced Meyers in a rematch, with Smith losing after he fell through a table at ringside while attempting a moonsault and was subsequently counted out.

== Results ==
No.	Results	Stipulations	Times
1	J.T. Smith defeated Hack Meyers by pinfall	Singles match	6:33
2	Val Puccio defeated Tony Stetson via disqualification	Singles match	1:23
3	Raven's Nest (Raven, Stevie Richards and The Dudley Brothers (Big Dick Dudley and Dudley Dudley)) (with Beulah McGillicutty) defeated Tommy Dreamer, Cactus Jack and The Pitbulls (Pitbull #1 and Pitbull #2) by pinfall	Eight-man tag team match	—
4	2 Cold Scorpio, Cactus Jack, and Dean Malenko defeated Eddie Guerrero and The Steiner Brothers (Rick Steiner and Scott Steiner) by pinfall	Six-man tag team match	21:59
5	Mikey Whipwreck defeated The Sandman by pinfall	Singapore cane match	5:51
6	The Gangstas (Mustafa and New Jack) defeated The Public Enemy (Johnny Grunge and Rocco Rock)	Stretcher match	17:51
