= Wrestlepalooza =

- Created by: Paul Heyman (ECW iteration); Triple H and Nick Khan (WWE iteration)
- Promotions: Extreme Championship Wrestling (1995–2000); WWE (2025–present)
- Brands: Raw (2025–present); SmackDown (2025–present)
- First event: Wrestlepalooza (1995)
- Event gimmick: Wrestling fan convention

Wrestlepalooza is a professional wrestling event produced by WWE. It was originally produced by Extreme Championship Wrestling (ECW) in 1995, 1997, 1998, and 2000. Most of the events' matches were filmed for broadcast during ECW's television programs (including ECW Hardcore TV and ECW on TNN), although the 1998 edition would be televised as a pay-per-view event.

In August 2025, WWE — which acquired ECW's assets and library after its 2001 closure — announced it would hold a new event under the Wrestlepalooza name in Indianapolis in September.

== Dates, venues, and main events ==
#	Event	Date	City	Venue	Main event
Extreme Championship Wrestling
1	Wrestlepalooza (1995)	August 5, 1995	Philadelphia, Pennsylvania	ECW Arena	The Public Enemy (Rocco Rock and Johnny Grunge) vs. The Gangstas (New Jack and Mustafa) in a Stretcher match
2	Wrestlepalooza (1997)	June 7, 1997	Philadelphia, Pennsylvania	ECW Arena	The Eliminators (Kronus and Saturn) (c) vs. The Dudley Boyz (Buh Buh Ray Dudley and D-Von Dudley) for the ECW World Tag Team Championship
3	Wrestlepalooza (1998)	May 3, 1998	Marietta, Georgia	Cobb County Civic Center	Shane Douglas (c) vs. Al Snow for the ECW World Heavyweight Championship
4	Wrestlepalooza (2000)	April 16, 2000	St. Charles, Missouri	Family Arena	Tommy Dreamer, Dusty Rhodes, The Sandman and New Jack vs. The Network (Steve Corino, Jack Victory, Rhino and Yoshihiro Tajiri) in a Street Fight
WWE
5	Wrestlepalooza (2025)	September 20, 2025	Indianapolis, Indiana	Gainbridge Fieldhouse	Cody Rhodes (c) vs. Drew McIntyre for the Undisputed WWE Championship
6	Wrestlepalooza (2026)	December 12, 2026	Perth, Western Australia, Australia	RAC Arena	
(c) – refers to the champion(s) heading into the match
