= NXT Halloween Havoc (2026) =

WWE premium live event and television special

- Promotional poster featuring the event's host Danhausen in the center circled clockwise by Zaria, Cruz Montana, Zilla Fatu, Grayson Waller, and Kelani Jordan
- Promotion: WWE
- Brand: NXT
- Date: October 31, 2026
- City: Orlando, Florida
- Venue: WWE Performance Center

WWE event chronology
← Previous; Money in the Bank	Next → Crown Jewel

Halloween Havoc chronology
← Previous; 2025	Next → —

NXT major events chronology
← Previous; Heatwave	Next → TLC: Tables, Ladders & Chairs

The 2026 NXT Halloween Havoc, also promoted as NXT Halloween Havoc: Orlando, was a professional wrestling premium live event (PLE) and television special produced by WWE, held for wrestlers from the promotion's developmental brand, NXT. It was WWE's seventh annual NXT Halloween Havoc and the 19th Halloween Havoc overall. It took place on Halloween on Saturday, October 31, 2026, at NXT's home venue, the WWE Performance Center in Orlando, Florida. This was only the second Halloween Havoc to take place on Halloween, after night two of the 2023 event. WWE main roster wrestler, Danhausen, served as the event's host.

Six matches were contested at the event. In the main event, Grayson Waller defeated Tony D'Angelo to retain the NXT Championship. In another prominent match, Kelani Jordan defeated Wren Sinclair to retain the NXT Women's Championship. The PLE was simulcast on The CW's linear channel and ESPN Unlimited in the United States, marking the first Halloween Havoc to broadcast on both services.

== Production ==
=== Background ===
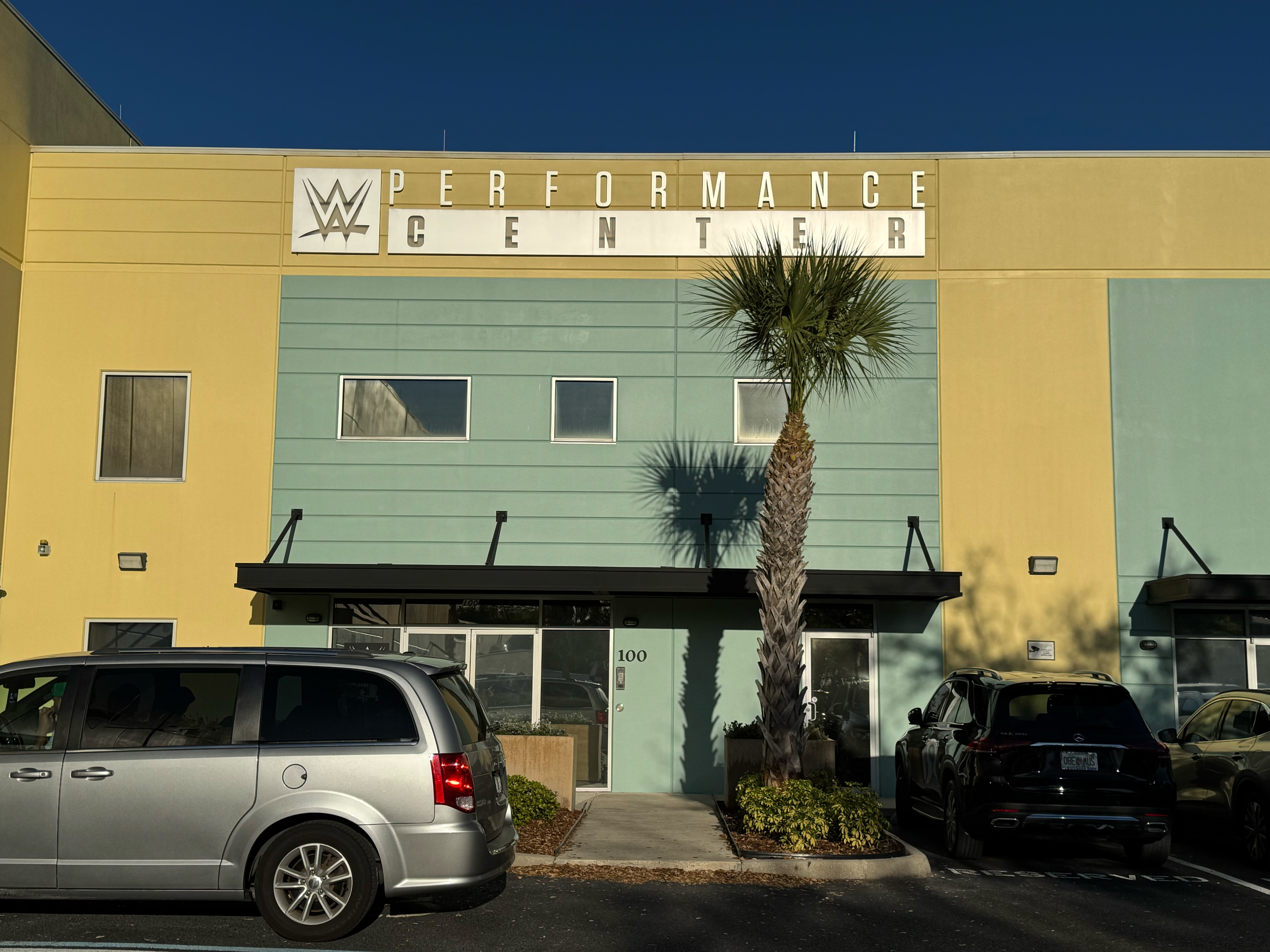
NXT's seventh annual Halloween Havoc, and the 19th Halloween Havoc overall, was held at the brand's home venue, the WWE Performance Center in Orlando, Florida.

Halloween Havoc is a professional wrestling event established in 1989, held in October as part of the month's Halloween festivities. It was originally produced as an annual pay-per-view (PPV) event by the former World Championship Wrestling (WCW) from 1989 until 2000. Following WWE's acquisition of WCW in March 2001, WWE reinstated Halloween Havoc as an annual event for its developmental brand, NXT, in 2020. The 2020, 2021, and 2023 events were held as television specials of the NXT program on the USA Network, but for 2022, it was a premium live event (PLE). The 2023 edition was also two nights, but it returned as a one-night PLE in 2024.

On August 30, 2026, at Heatwave, NXT General Manager Robert Stone announced that WWE's seventh NXT Halloween Havoc, and the 19th Halloween Havoc overall, would take place on Halloween on Saturday, October 31, 2026, at NXT's home venue, the WWE Performance Center in Orlando, Florida. The event was in turn promoted as NXT Halloween Havoc: Orlando and was only the second Halloween Havoc to take place on Halloween, after night two of the 2023 event. On the October 13 episode of NXT, WWE main roster wrestler Danhausen was announced to be the host of Halloween Havoc.

=== Broadcast outlets ===
In the United States, the event was broadcast as a television special on The CW's linear channel, marking the first Halloween Havoc on The CW as NXT's PLEs began broadcasting on the channel in June after WWE's contract with Peacock for NXT's events expired in March. Additionally, ESPN announced a deal with The CW in which CW Sports, including all of NXT's programming, would be simulcast on both The CW and ESPN Unlimited beginning in August—ESPN Unlimited had already been broadcasting WWE's main roster PLEs since September 2025. As a result, this was also the first Halloween Havoc on ESPN Unlimited. Outside of the U.S., it aired on SuperSport in Sub-Saharan Africa and Netflix everywhere else.

=== Storylines ===
The event included six matches that resulted from scripted storylines. Results were predetermined by WWE's writers on the NXT brand, while storylines were produced on WWE's weekly television program, NXT.

On the October 6 episode of NXT, a battle royal was held to determine Kelani Jordan's challenger for the NXT Women's Championship at Halloween Havoc. The battle royal featured wrestlers from all four WWE brands—Raw, SmackDown, NXT, and Evolve—as well as sister promotion Lucha Libre AAA Worldwide (AAA) and partner promotion Total Nonstop Action Wrestling (TNA). The match was won by the suspended Wren Sinclair, who disguised herself as AAA's Lady Shani; Sinclair had been suspended by NXT General Manager Robert Stone on the September 8 episode after attacking Jordan and hitting a referee; however, as a result of her victory, her suspension was lifted the following week.

On the October 6 episode of NXT, Tony D'Angelo won a #1 contender match against Myles Borne to earn an NXT Championship match against Grayson Waller at Halloween Havoc.

== Event ==
Other on-screen personnel
Role	Name
Host	Danhausen
Commentators	Vic Joseph
Commentators	Booker T
Ring announcer	Mike Rome
Panelists	Blake Howard
Panelists	Dave LaGreca
Panelists	Tatum Paxley
Pre-show panelists	Megan Morant
Pre-show panelists	Sam Roberts

=== Preliminary matches ===
The PLE began with Danhausen appearing with the Minihausens and stating that he turned rooms in the Performance Center into "scare rooms".

In the first match, Myles Borne took on Tavion Heights in a Weapons Wild match. Various weapons were used throughout the match, including a kendo stick, chairs, tables, exposed turnbuckles, a fire extinguisher, and a toolbox. As Borne attempted Borne Again, Heights performed a back bodydrop on Borne onto the nuts and bolts. Borne recovered and performed a draping DDT on Heights. Borne performed a powerslam on Heights onto the chairs, nuts, and bolts for a nearfall. Heights fired back with some chair shots and placed Borne in a trash can, where Pilminaized Borne's ankle. In the climax, as Heights applied the ankle lock on Borne, Borne was able to escape by rolling Heights into the exposed turnbuckles. Afterwards, Borne used a camera to strike Heights with it, sending him into the Slim Jim table at ringside, and performed Borne Again on a trash can to win the match.

Next, NXT Women's North American Champion Zaria took on Izzi Dame in a non-title match. The ending came when the referee took the title belt from Dame. Zaria took advantage, taking out Dame with a lariat. As Zaria argued with the referee over the title belt, Dame performed a Knee Plus to send it into Zaria's face to win the match.

After that, Danhausen appeared with the Minihausens and spun the wheel, which landed on "Very Nice, Very Evil". Danhausen subsequently chose a No Rules Falls Count Anywhere match as the stipulation for Zilla Fatu vs. Charlie Dempsey. After the two used a pumpkin, steps, and a chain as weapons, Fatu escaped a sleeper hold attempt by Dempsey and took out Lexis King, Channing "Stacks" Lorenzo, and Uriah Connors. Afterwards, Fatu performed a Samoan Spike on Dempsey and followed up with a Frog Splash to win the match.

In the fourth match, Kelani Jordan defended the NXT Women's Championship against Wren Sinclair. During the match, Jordan performed a slingshot stomp on Sinclair's elbow. Sinclair was able to reverse a Jackknife pin into a Final Wren-ch, which Jordan was able to escape. Jordan performed a 450 splash on Sinclair for a nearfall. Sinclair blocked a moonsault attempt from Jordan by getting her knees up. As Sinclair applied the Final Wren-ch again, Jordan used the turnbuckle to turn it into a pin attempt and placed her foot on the bottom rope, pinning Sinclair for the three count and retaining the title.

In the penultimate match, Shiloh Hill took on Naraku. In the end, after Naraku and Hill spat mist at each other, Hill countered by using "fog" and performed a lift-up neckbreaker on Hill to win the match.

Before the main event, NXT General Manager Robert Stone berated NXT Women's Champion Kelani Jordan for her recent appearance on Raw and that on the following episode of NXT, she would defend her title against a mystery opponent. Afterwards, Kam Hendrix met up with Danhausen, where Danhausen planned to clone Hendrix so he could make a profit. As Danhausen left, Hendrix was surrounded by lab hands, with one of them being EK Prosper, who beat Hendrix down and mocked him.

=== Main event ===
In the main event, Grayson Waller defended the NXT Championship against Tony D'Angelo. During the match, after Waller grabbed a crowbar, he performed a discus forearm on D'Angelo. As D'Angelo performed a spear on Waller, the latter rolled out of the ring. Waller performed his rolling cutter on D'Angelo through the announce table. In the ring, D'Angelo recovered and performed a uranage on Waller, who placed his hand on the rope to void the pin. As the referee tried to take the crowbar away from D'Angelo, Waller tackled D'Angelo into the referee. After D'Angelo performed a spear on Waller, the latter struck D'Angelo with the crowbar and followed up with the Rolling Stunner to retain the title. After the match, Danhausen appeared and announced that his "personal friend" had a message for Waller. CM Punk appeared on the Titantron, challenging Waller for the title on the following episode of NXT.

== Results ==
No.	Results	Stipulations	Times
1	Myles Borne defeated Tavion Heights by pinfall	Spin the Wheel, Make the Deal: Weapons Wild match	14:44
2	Izzi Dame defeated Zaria by pinfall	Singles match	12:56
3	Zilla Fatu defeated Charlie Dempsey (with Arianna Grace, Channing "Stacks" Lorenzo, Lexis King, and Uriah Connors) by pinfall	Spin the Wheel, Make the Deal: Very Nice, Very Evil match The event's host Danhausen chose the stipulation, which was a No Rules, Falls Count Anywhere match.	13:15
4	Kelani Jordan (c) defeated Wren Sinclair by pinfall	Singles match for the NXT Women's Championship	18:40
5	Shiloh Hill defeated Naraku by pinfall	Singles match	2:28
6	Grayson Waller (c) defeated Tony D'Angelo by pinfall	Singles match for the NXT Championship	22:37
(c) / – the champion(s) heading into the match
