= Wrestlepalooza (1997) =

1997 Extreme Championship Wrestling supercard event

- The ECW Arena.
- Promotion: Extreme Championship Wrestling
- Date: June 6, 1997
- City: Philadelphia, Pennsylvania
- Venue: ECW Arena
- Attendance: 1,250

Event chronology
← Previous; The Buffalo Invasion	Next → Orgy of Violence

Wrestlepalooza chronology
← Previous; 1995	Next → 1998

Wrestlepalooza (1997) was the second Wrestlepalooza professional wrestling event produced by Extreme Championship Wrestling (ECW). The event took place on June 6, 1997 in the ECW Arena in Philadelphia, Pennsylvania.

Eight professional wrestling matches were contested at the event. In the main event, The Eliminators defeated The Dudley Boyz to retain the World Tag Team Championship. Other matches on the card featured Sabu versus Taz, Terry Funk versus Chris Candido for the World Heavyweight Championship and Tommy Dreamer pinning Raven for the first time in a Loser Leaves Town match, marking the end of a feud that first began upon Raven's debut in January 1995. Raven subsequently left ECW and joined World Championship Wrestling. Taz defeated Shane Douglas in an impromptu match to win the World Television Championship, ending Douglas' nearly year-long reign.

== Storylines ==
The event featured wrestlers from pre-existing scripted feuds and storylines. Wrestlers portrayed villains, heroes, or less distinguishable characters in the scripted events that built tension and culminated in a wrestling match or series of matches played out on ECW's television program Hardcore TV.

Tommy Dreamer and Raven were involved in a lengthy feud which began after Raven made his ECW debut on the January 10, 1995 episode of Hardcore TV and continued on-and-off for the next two years. At Barely Legal, Dreamer interfered in Raven's title defense of the World Heavyweight Championship against the #1 contender Terry Funk to counter the interference of Raven's Nest and hit a DDT to Raven, which cost him the title against Funk. On the April 26 episode of Hardcore TV, Raven convinced his former lackey Stevie Richards to reunite for one last time to avenge the loss of the title from Terry Funk and Tommy Dreamer. Dreamer cost Raven, the opportunities to regain the title at Chapter 2 and The Buffalo Invasion. On the May 29 episode of Hardcore TV, it was announced that Dreamer and Raven would compete in a Loser Leaves Town match between the two to end their feud at Wrestlepalooza.

At The Buffalo Invasion, Stevie Richards and Raven defeated Terry Funk and Tommy Dreamer in a tag team match when Richards pinned Funk. As a result of pinning the champion Funk, on the May 29 episode of Hardcore TV, it was announced that Richards would receive a title shot against Funk for the World Heavyweight Championship at Wrestlepalooza. However, a week later on Hardcore TV, Joey Styles announced that Richards injured his neck at Buffalo Invasion would be unable to wrestle at the event and would be replaced by Chris Candido as Funk's challenger for the title at Wrestlepalooza.

At Barely Legal, The Eliminators defeated The Dudley Boyz to win the World Tag Team Championship. The two teams feuded with each other and competed in several matches for the next few months over the title. On the May 29 episode of Hardcore TV, it was announced that Dudleys would face The Sandman and Balls Mahoney at Wrestlepalooza, with the winning team earning a title shot against Eliminators later at the event. Later that night, Dudleys interfered in a match between Sandman and Mahoney by attacking both men. On May 31, Perry Saturn tore his ACL during a title defense against Dudley Boyz and PG-13 and Saturn was examined to be out of action for a year.

At Barely Legal, Taz defeated Sabu in a match and then offered a handshake to Sabu until Rob Van Dam attacked Taz from behind and Sabu joined him in the assault. Taz's manager Bill Alfonso turned on him and sided with Sabu and RVD in the assault, leading to a double turn as Taz turned face and Sabu and RVD turned heels. Sabu and RVD turned on ECW and joined World Wrestling Federation (WWF). At Chapter 2, Taz and Chris Candido defeated RVD and Sabu in a tag team match. On the May 29 episode of Hardcore TV, it was announced that Sabu would be returning to ECW at Wrestlepalooza. The following week on Hardcore TV, it was announced that Sabu would face Taz in their rematch from Barely Legal at the event.

At The Buffalo Invasion, Shane Douglas defeated Chris Chetti to retain the World Television Championship This led to a rematch between the two for the title at Wrestlepalooza.

== Event ==
=== Preliminary matches ===
In the opening match, Shane Douglas defended the World Television Championship against Chris Chetti. Douglas nailed a belly-to-belly suplex to Chetti to retain the title.

Next, The Pitbulls (Pitbull #1 and Pitbull #2) took on The F.B.I. (Little Guido and Tracy Smothers). Pitbulls superbombed Guido to win the match.

Next, the makeshift team of The Sandman and Balls Mahoney competed against The Dudley Boyz (Buh Buh Ray Dudley and D-Von Dudley) to earn a title shot for the World Tag Team Championship later in the show. After a big brawl in the ring, Dudleys nailed a Dudley Death Drop to Mahoney on a steel chair for the win. After the match, Sandman scared the Dudleys away with his Singapore cane.

Later, Terry Funk defended the World Heavyweight Championship against Chris Candido. Candido managed a great deal of offence by driving Funk with tables and chairs to work on his neck. He nailed four piledrivers on Funk but Funk still managed to compete. Funk ultimately pinned Candido with a roll-up to retain the title.

The following contest was a loser leaves town match between Tommy Dreamer and Raven. Lupus advised Raven not to compete and he left until Dreamer chased him away. Both men brawled at ringside and then the action returned to the ring. Dreamer hit a DDT on Raven for the victory, thus marking the first time in his ECW career and their feud that Dreamer pinned Raven and also marked Dreamer's first win over Raven in their rivalry. As a result of the pre-match stipulation, Raven was forced to leave ECW.

After the match, the lights went out and as the lights came back, Rob Van Dam and Sabu attacked Dreamer and then the lights went out and came back only to reveal Jerry Lawler present in the ring, who insulted ECW and challenged various ECW wrestlers to come and beat RVD and Sabu. The Sandman, The Gangstas, Axl Rotten and Nova were all beaten up until Taz made the save and challenged Sabu to a match, which took place then away. Taz applied a Tazmission on Sabu but Sabu turned it into a roll-up to win the match. Taz refused to release the hold until several referees stormed to the ring to try to break it up but he attacked them and applied Tazmissions on referees and Bill Alfonso.

This would lead to Shane Douglas coming out and confront Taz. Douglas ordered him to leave the ring but Taz refused and Taz challenged Douglas for the World Television Championship and agreed to leave ECW for thirty days if he did not win the match in under five minutes and then Taz further suggested that he would leave ECW for sixty days if he did not win in under three minutes. Taz applied a Tazmission on Douglas, making him submit to the move to quickly win the World Television Championship.

=== Main event match ===
In the main event, The Eliminators (Kronus and Saturn) defended the World Tag Team Championship against Dudley Boyz. Saturn was unable to compete due to his torn ACL, forcing Kronus to compete against Dudleys on his own. Saturn eventually got involved and hit a diving elbow drop on D-Von to retain the titles.

== Reception ==
Wrestling 20 Years Ago staff praised the event, giving it a rating of 7 out of 10 and considering it "the best show ECW put together in the year 1997 so far" with "Every match told a story, featured interesting spots, and, generally, the booking made sense. The only real negative on the card was the layout of the Funk/Candido match, even if the match itself wasn’t so bad."

However, The Wrestling Revolution staff stated Wrestlepalooza to be "Overall, a complete and total stinker from ECW! Just an atrocious show."

== Aftermath ==
The feud between The Eliminators and The Dudley Boyz continued for the title after the event. On the June 26 episode of Hardcore TV, John Kronus lost the World Tag Team Championship to Dudleys in a handicap match due to his tag team partner Perry Saturn being injured and unable to compete.

Raven legitimately left ECW after losing to Tommy Dreamer and jumped ship to World Championship Wrestling (WCW). After a mid-card stint in WCW, Raven returned to ECW two years later on the September 3, 1999 episode of ECW on TNN.

Shane Douglas and Taz began a lengthy feud with each other which continued after Douglas entered the World Heavyweight Championship picture and eventually won the title. Their rivalry culminated at the Guilty as Charged event in 1999.

Rob Van Dam and Sabu's allegiance with WWF's Jerry Lawler at Wrestlepalooza led to Tommy Dreamer joining forces with The Sandman to represent ECW against the traitors and they engaged in a lengthy feud with RVD, Sabu and Lawler that would continue throughout the rest of the year, with their first major encounter taking place at Orgy of Violence where Dreamer and Sandman took on Sabu and RVD in a tag team match. At Heat Wave, Dreamer and Sandman teamed with color commentator Rick Rude to take on RVD, Sabu and Lawler in a steel cage match which ended in a no contest after Rude turned on Dreamer and Sandman.

== Results ==
No.	Results	Stipulations	Times
1	Shane Douglas (c) (with Francine) defeated Chris Chetti	Singles match for the ECW World Television Championship	06:52
2	The Pitbulls (Pitbull #1 and Pitbull #2) defeated The F.B.I. (Little Guido and Tracy Smothers) (with Tommy Rich)	Tag team match	07:33
3	The Dudley Boyz (Buh Buh Ray Dudley and D-Von Dudley) (with Joel Gertner, Sign Guy Dudley and Big Dick Dudley) defeated The Sandman and Balls Mahoney	Tag team match to determine the #1 contenders for the ECW World Tag Team Championship	08:30
4	Terry Funk (c) defeated Chris Candido	Singles match for the ECW World Heavyweight Championship	12:57
5	Tommy Dreamer (with Beulah McGillicutty) defeated Raven (with Chastity and Lupus)	Loser Leaves Town match	16:06
6	Sabu (with Bill Alfonso) defeated Taz	Singles match	08:12
7	Taz defeated Shane Douglas (c) (with Francine) via submission	Singles match for the ECW World Television Championship	02:50
8	The Eliminators (Kronus and Saturn) (c) defeated The Dudley Boyz (Buh Buh Ray Dudley and D-Von Dudley) (with Joel Gertner, Sign Guy Dudley and Big Dick Dudley)	Tag team match for the ECW World Tag Team Championship	07:31
(c) / – the champion(s) heading into the match

== See also ==
- 1997 in professional wrestling
