= Born to Be Wired =

1997 Extreme Championship Wrestling live event

- The ECW Arena
- Promotion: Extreme Championship Wrestling
- Date: August 9, 1997 (aired August 15 and 22, 1997)
- City: Philadelphia, Pennsylvania, US
- Venue: ECW Arena
- Attendance: c.1,300

Event chronology
← Previous; Heat Wave	Next → Terry Funk's WrestleFest

Born to Be Wired was a professional wrestling live event produced by Extreme Championship Wrestling (ECW) on August 9, 1997. The event was held in the ECW Arena in Philadelphia, Pennsylvania in the United States. Excerpts from Born to Be Wired aired on episodes #225 and #226 of the syndicated television program ECW Hardcore TV on August 12 and August 19, 1997, while the full event was released on VHS in 1997 and on DVD in 2002. The main event was also included in the 2005 compilation DVD BloodSport - The Most Violent Matches of ECW.

Born to Be Wired is best known for its main event: a barbed wire match for the ECW World Heavyweight Championship between Sabu and Terry Funk.

== Event ==
"Terry Funk and Sabu wrestled in real barbed wire. If you look at the end of the match, there really isn't a pinfall, because Terry Funk's shoulders really aren't on the mat, because the two had become so intertwined in the barbed wire that they were just entangled in this giant ball that was just piercing both of them. Terry Funk was very lucky, because there was one piece of barbed wire that was sticking out that was very close to his eyeball. We had to cut them free from one another with wire cutters and get them both to the emergency room. That was the most atrocious thing I've ever seen in my life. Everyone who did a barbed wire match before that realized that they had been topped."
- Joey Styles

The commentator for Born to Be Wired was Joey Styles. The ring announcer was Bob Artese.

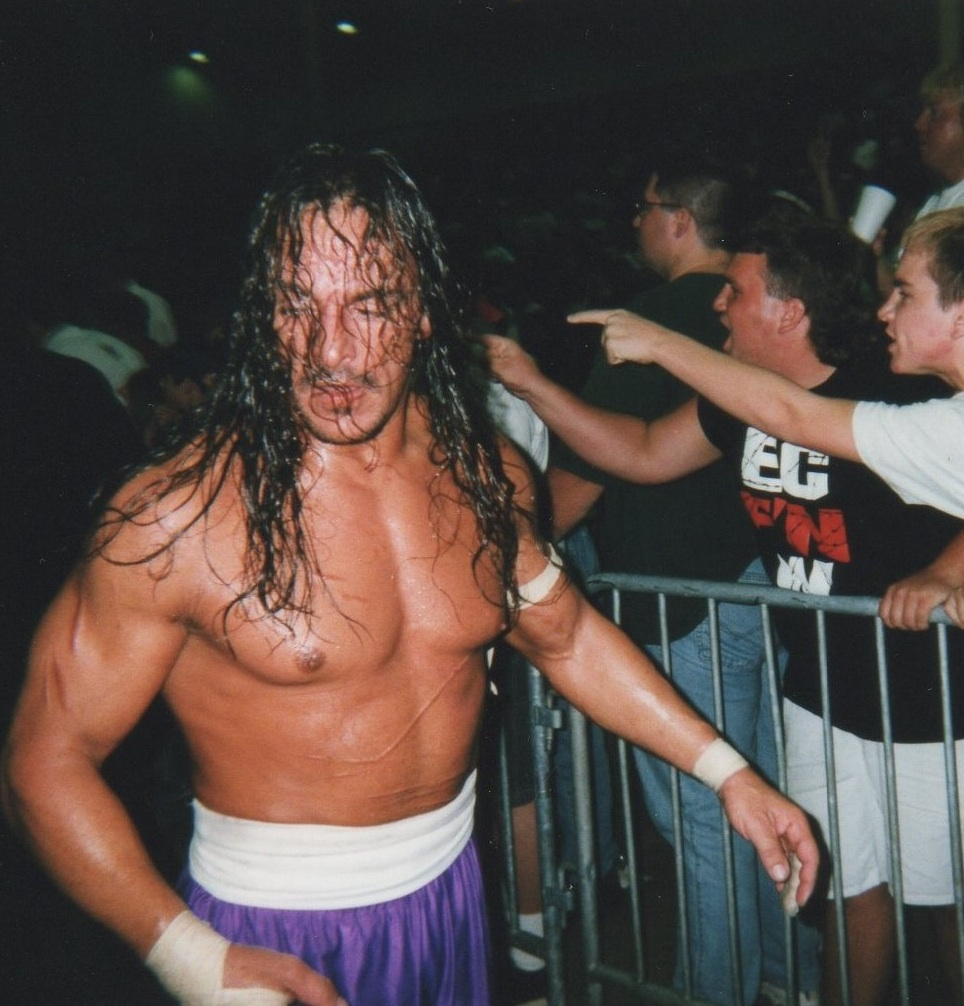
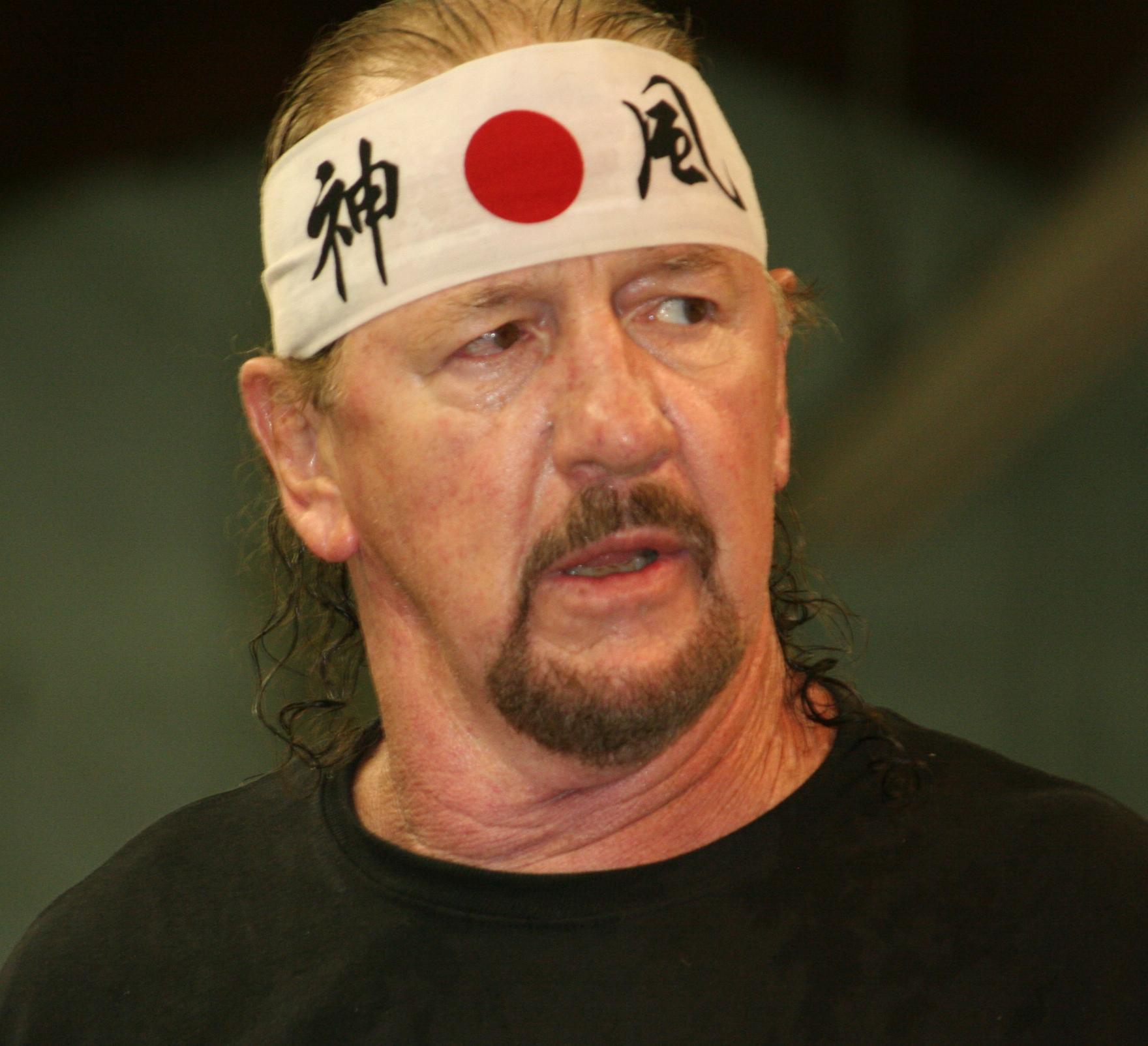
The main event of Born to Be Wired was a barbed wire match between Sabu (top) and ECW World Heavyweight Champion Terry Funk (bottom).

The opening bout was a singles match between Little Guido and Pablo Márquez. Little Guido won the match by pinfall after hitting Márquez with the Italian flag.

The second bout was a singles match between Louie Spicolli and Mikey Whipwreck, with Whipwreck winning by pinfall using a FrankenMikey.

The third bout was a singles match between Bam Bam Bigelow and Spike Dudley. The much larger Bigelow dominated the match with power moves until Dudley accidentally gave Bigelow a low blow, then delivered a victory roll for an upset pinfall victory. Following his victory, Dudley was dubbed "the Giant Killer".

The fourth bout was a singles match between Chris Candido and Chris Chetti. Candido won the bout by pinfall following a super double underhook suplex.

The fifth bout was a singles match between Lance Storm and Shane Douglas. Douglas won the bout by pinfall following a belly-to-belly suplex.

The sixth bout saw ECW World Television Champion Taz defend the title against Al Snow. Taz won the bout by submission after applying the Tazmission.

The seventh bout was a six-man tag team match pitting the Dudley Brothers against Axl Rotten, Balls Mahoney, and Hack Meyers. The bout began as a tag team match between the Dudley Boyz and Rotten and Mahoney, but following repeated interference by Big Dick Dudley, Rotten and Mahoney brought Meyers to the ring to even the numbers, eventually resulting in the match being declared a six-man tag team match. The match ended when the Dudley Boyz delivered the 3D to Meyers and then pinned him.

The penultimate match was a singles bout between Rob Van Dam and Tommy Dreamer, with Van Dam representing the faction of World Wrestling Federation-aligned wrestlers who were "invading" ECW. Following interference from Van Dam's tag team partner Sabu, Van Dam defeated Dreamer by pinfall after giving him a corkscrew leg drop onto a trash can. Following the match, a large brawl broke out featuring many members of the roster.

The main event saw ECW World Heavyweight Champion Terry Funk defend his championship against Sabu in a barbed wire match. Early in the match, both men repeatedly collided with the barbed wire, causing them to bleed. After Sabu severely tore his bicep open on the barbed wire, he temporarily closed the wound using surgical tape and continue to wrestle. Towards the end of the match, Rob Van Dam interfered on Sabu's behalf until being driven away by Tommy Dreamer. The match ended with both men badly tangled in barbed wire, after which Sabu wrapped barbed wire around his leg and then delivered a leg drop to Funk before pinning him to win the ECW World Heavyweight Championship. Following the match, the two men were so entangled in wire that Sabu's manager Bill Alfonso and the ring crew had to use wire cutters to free them. Sabu's arm required over 100 stitches to close the wound.

== Reaction ==
"The last time Sabu was placed in this situation, he was the challenger against Terry Funk in August, 1997. Sabu had a barbed wire match against Terry Funk, and it was the last barbed wire match in the history of ECW because I could not in good conscience subject anybody else to that level of brutality. Sabu ripped his arm in the barbed wire and ended up receiving more than 100 stitches, but didn't stop the match; he continued to wrestle after taping his own arm together so that he could continue."
- Paul Heyman

The main event of Born to Be Wired was recognized for its brutality. In 2012, World Wrestling Entertainment named the main event one of ECW's "25 most must-see matches". Due to the intensity of the match, ECW promoter Paul Heyman opted never to book another barbed wire match.

== Results ==
No.	Results	Stipulations	Times
1	Little Guido (with Tommy Rich and Tracy Smothers) defeated Pablo Márquez by pinfall	Singles match	6:05
2	Mikey Whipwreck defeated Louie Spicolli by pinfall	Singles match	6:56
3	Spike Dudley defeated Bam Bam Bigelow by pinfall	Singles match	6:37
4	Chris Candido defeated Chris Chetti by pinfall	Singles match	10:43
5	Shane Douglas (with Francine) defeated Lance Storm by pinfall	Singles match	9:02
6	Taz (c) defeated Al Snow by submission	Singles match for the ECW World Television Championship	10:15
7	The Dudley Brothers (Big Dick Dudley, Buh Buh Ray Dudley, and D-Von Dudley) (with Joel Gertner and Sign Guy Dudley) defeated the Hardcore Chair Swingin' Freaks (Axl Rotten and Balls Mahoney) and Hack Meyers by pinfall	Six-man tag team match	12:00
8	Rob Van Dam (with Bill Alfonso) defeated Tommy Dreamer (with Beulah McGillicutty) by pinfall	Singles match	9:49
9	Sabu (with Bill Alfonso) defeated Terry Funk (c) by pinfall	Barbed wire match for the ECW World Heavyweight Championship	20:38
(c) / – the champion(s) heading into the match
