= Orgy of Violence =

1997 Extreme Championship Wrestling supercard event

- The ECW Arena.
- Promotion: Extreme Championship Wrestling
- Date: June 28, 1997 (aired July 5 and July 12, 1997)
- City: Philadelphia, Pennsylvania, US
- Venue: ECW Arena
- Attendance: c. 1,200

Event chronology
← Previous; Wrestlepalooza	Next → Heat Wave

Orgy of Violence was a professional wrestling live event produced by Extreme Championship Wrestling (ECW) on June 28, 1997. The event was held in the ECW Arena in Philadelphia, Pennsylvania in the United States. Excerpts from Orgy of Violence aired on episodes #219 and #220 of ECW Hardcore TV on July 5, 1997 and July 12, 1997.

== Background ==
At the time of Orgy of Violence, an ongoing angle saw a rivalry between professional wrestling promotion the World Wrestling Federation. ECW had "invaded" the WWF's Raw broadcast on February 24, 1997, while WWF personality Jerry Lawler made a surprise appearance at ECW's Wrestlepalooza event on June 7, 1997. Jim Cornette, who at the time was working for the World Wrestling Federation, was approached by Chris Candido about making a surprise appearance at Orgy of Violence in a continuation of the angle. Cornette agreed to appear if ECW promoter Paul Heyman agreed to apologize to NWA New Jersey promoter Dennis Coralluzzo - from whom he had been estranged since the events of the August 1994 NWA World Title Tournament - and resume cooperation with him.

== Event ==
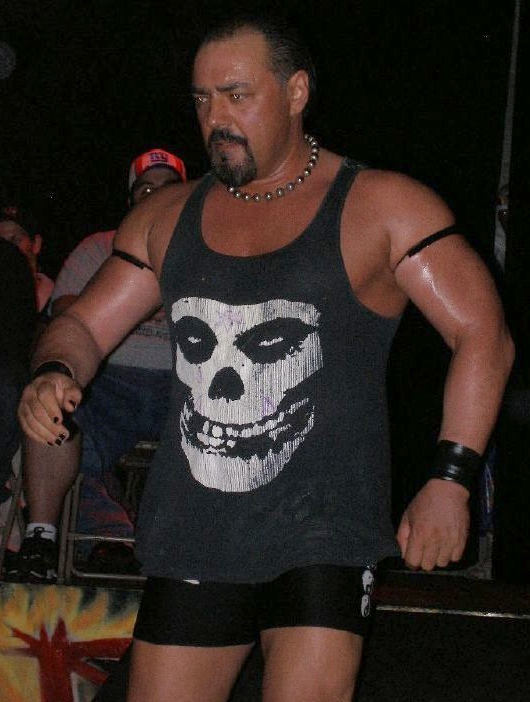
Jason made his return to ECW at Orgy of Violence.

Orgy of Violence was attended by approximately 1,200 people. The announcers for the event were Joey Styles and Rick Rude.

The opening bout was a singles match between Lance Storm and Tracy Smothers. Storm won the bout by pinfall following a springboard back elbow.

The second bout was a tag team match pitting Mikey Whipwreck and Spike Dudley against PG-13. During the match, Jason (who had been absent from ECW since 1995) made his return to ECW, hiding under the ring and distracting Whipwreck by grabbing his leg. PG-13 went on to win the match, with Wolfie D giving J. C. Ice a til-a-whirl slam onto Dudley for a pinfall victory. After the match, Whipwreck gave Jason a chair shot, then Dudley and Whipwreck gave him a double dropkick off the ring apron.

The third bout saw ECW World Television Champion Taz defend his title against Kronus. Taz defeated Kronus to retain his title, forcing him to submit using the Tazmission.

The fourth bout was a singles match between Chris Candido and Tom Prichard, who had previously teamed together in the World Wrestling Federation as the Bodydonnas. Candido won the match by pinfall following the Blonde Bombshell. Following the match, Candido praised Prichard and shook his hand.

The fifth bout was a singles match between Bam Bam Bigelow and Pitbull #2. At the start of the match, Bigelow hit Pitbull #2 with his chain, causing him to bleed. After Bigelow's Triple Threat stablemate Shane Douglas attacked Pitbull #2 (with Douglas's valet Francine distracting the referee), Pitbull #2's tag team partner Pitbull #1 entered the ring and attacked Douglas. As Douglas and Pitbull #1 brawled outside of the ring, Bigelow's other stablemate Chris Candido grabbed Pitbull #2's leg, enabling Bigelow to give Pitbull #2 a bulldog then pin him.

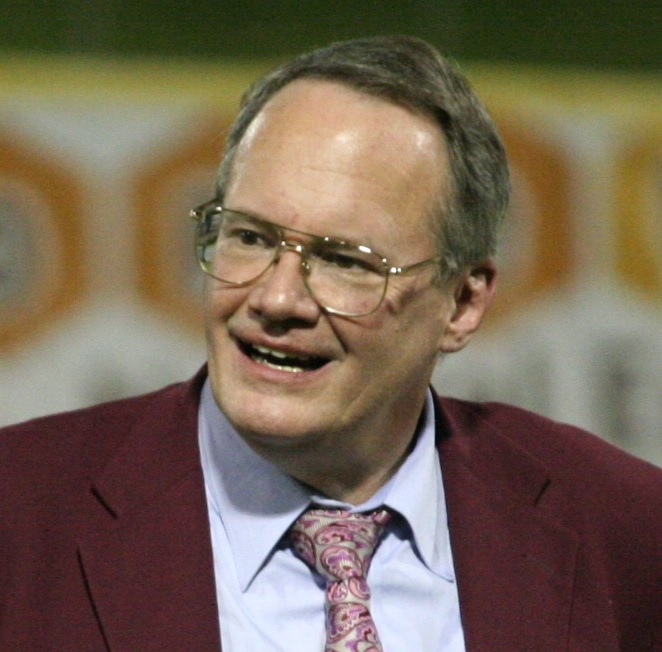
Jim Cornette made a surprise appearance at Orgy of Violence.

The sixth bout saw ECW World Tag Team Champions the Dudley Boyz defend their titles against the Gangstas. The Dudley Boyz defeated the Gangstas to retain their titles, pinning New Jack following a 3D.

The seventh bout was a singles match between Balls Mahoney and Louie Spicolli. Mahoney defeated Spicolli by pinfall following a chair shot.

The main event was a tag team match pitting Rob Van Dam and Sabu against the Sandman and Tommy Dreamer. The match was a continuation of the World Wrestling Federation's "invasion" of ECW, with Sabu and Van Dam representing the invading force and Dreamer and the Sandman representing ECW. Towards the end of the match, Dreamer and The Sandman attempted to simultaneously piledrive Sabu and Van Dam, but the arena lights went off. When the lights came back on, Jerry Lawler of the World Wrestling Federation was in the ring. Lawler, Sabu, and Van Dam beat down Dreamer and the Sandman, but, as Lawler taunted the audience, Dreamer and the Sandman regrouped. As Dreamer and the Sandman prepared to attack Lawler, the arena lights went off once more. When the lights came back on, Jim Cornette was in the ring. Cornette hit Dreamer with his signature tennis racket, enabling Lawler to DDT him. Sabu and Van Dam then gave Dreamer and the Sandman simultaneous leg drops before pinning them. Following the match, the four men continued to beat down Dreamer and the Sandman, with Lawler giving Dreamer a stiff shot to the groin with a Singapore cane that legitimately injured him, with Dreamer having to attend a hospital to have one of his testicles drained of fluid.

Following the main event, Taz came to the ring, causing Lawler and his allies to retreat. Taz then demanded that a member of the audience who was wearing a World Wrestling Federation t-shirt give him the t-shirt, then burned it in the middle of the ring.

== Aftermath ==
The events of Orgy of Violence led to several matches at the next ECW supercard, Heat Wave, on July 19, 1997. Mikey Whipwreck and Spike Dudley defeated Jason and PG-13 in a three-on-two handicap match. The Gangstas challenged the Dudley Boyz for the ECW World Tag Team Championship in a cage match, this time defeating them. In the main event, Rick Rude, the Sandman, and Tommy Dreamer faced Lawler, Rob Van Dam, and Sabu in another cage match, with the match ending in a no contest after Rude turned on his partners.

While Paul Heyman apologized to Dennis Coralluzzo, he did not keep his promise to resume cooperating with him.

== Results ==
No.	Results	Stipulations	Times
1	Lance Storm defeated Tracy Smothers (with Little Guido and Tommy Rich) by pinfall	Singles match	—
2	PG-13 (J. C. Ice and Wolfie D) defeated Mikey Whipwreck and Spike Dudley by pinfall	Tag team match	—
3	Taz (c) defeated Kronus by submission	Singles match for the ECW World Television Championship	—
4	Chris Candido defeated Tom Prichard by pinfall	Singles match	5:29
5	Bam Bam Bigelow (with Francine and Shane Douglas) defeated Pitbull #2 by pinfall	Singles match	8:44
6	The Dudley Boyz (Buh Buh Ray Dudley and D-Von Dudley) defeated the Gangstas (Musfata and New Jack) by pinfall	Tag team match for the ECW World Tag Team Championship	—
7	Balls Mahoney defeated Louie Spicolli by pinfall	Singles match	—
8	Rob Van Dam and Sabu (with Bill Alfonso) defeated the Sandman and Tommy Dreamer (with Beulah McGillicutty) by pinfall	Tag team match	13:09
(c) / – the champion(s) heading into the match
