= Heat Wave (1997) =

1997 Extreme Championship Wrestling supercard event

- The ECW Arena.
- Promotion: Extreme Championship Wrestling
- Date: July 19, 1997 (aired July 24, 1997)
- City: Philadelphia, Pennsylvania, US
- Venue: ECW Arena
- Attendance: 1,600

Event chronology
← Previous; Orgy of Violence	Next → Born to Be Wired

Heat Wave chronology
← Previous; 1996	Next → 1998

Heat Wave (1997) was the fourth Heat Wave professional wrestling live event produced by Extreme Championship Wrestling (ECW). The event took place on July 19, 1997 in the ECW Arena in Philadelphia, Pennsylvania in the United States.

Excerpts from Heat Wave appeared on episode #222 of ECW Hardcore TV, which was broadcast on July 22, 1997.

== Background ==
The event featured wrestlers from pre-existing scripted feuds and storylines. Wrestlers portrayed villains, heroes, or less distinguishable characters in the scripted events that built tension and culminated in a wrestling match or series of matches played out on ECW's television program Hardcore TV.

Rob Van Dam and Sabu shockingly turned heels at Barely Legal by attacking Taz after Taz had beaten Sabu in a match and Taz's manager Bill Alfonso also turned on him and sided with RVD and Sabu. RVD would betray ECW for World Wrestling Federation (WWF), where he formed an alliance with WWF's color commentator Jerry Lawler, who had been at odds against ECW since the February 24, 1997 episode of Monday Night Raw, where ECW wrestlers got involved and competed in several matches and Lawler berated and insulted ECW and got into an argument with Paul Heyman. At Wrestlepalooza, Tommy Dreamer defeated Raven in a Loser Leaves Town match and then RVD, Sabu and Lawler attacked Dreamer and several ECW wrestlers after the match. Lawler then made appearances on Hardcore TV, where he berated ECW in his derogatory promos and Sabu and RVD became traitors who betrayed ECW by siding with WWF. Dreamer formed an alliance with The Sandman, leading to the two facing RVD and Sabu in a losing effort at Orgy of Violence. ECW color commentator Rick Rude also got involved by speaking against Lawler's actions and insulting him in his promos. This led to a match between both sides at Heat Wave.

At Wrestlepalooza, The Eliminators (Saturn and Kronus) managed to retain the World Tag Team Championship against The Dudley Boyz (Buh Buh Ray Dudley and D-Von Dudley), despite Saturn's injury. Kronus would then defend the title in handicap matches as he ultimately lost the title to Dudley Boyz in a handicap match on the June 26 episode of Hardcore TV. The Gangstas (New Jack and Mustafa) would then become the contenders for the World Tag Team Championship as they received a title shot against Dudley Boyz at Orgy of Violence, where they failed to win the titles. On the July 17 episode of Hardcore TV, it was announced that Gangstas would receive another rematch against Dudleys at Heat Wave.

== Event ==
=== Preliminary matches ===
The opening match of the event was a 3-on-2 handicap match, in which the team of Mikey Whipwreck and Spike Dudley defeated PG-13 (J. C. Ice and Wolfie D) and Jason.

In the next match, Axl Rotten defeated Tracey Smothers.

Next, John Kronus took on Pablo Marquez. Kronus executed a 450° splash from the top rope to win the match.

Later, Chris Chetti and Balls Mahoney competed against The Triple Threat members Chris Candido and Bam Bam Bigelow in a tag team match. Candido pinned Chetti for the victory.

Next, Taz defended the World Television Championship against Lance Storm. Taz made Storm submit to a Tazmission to retain the title.

In the following match, Terry Funk defended the World Heavyweight Championship against Shane Douglas. Chris Candido and Francine interfered in the match as Francine bit Funk's ears. The referees checked onto Funk but he attacked them and Francine continued to bite it, forcing the referee to disqualify Douglas. As a result, Funk retained the title.

The Dudley Boyz (Buh Buh Ray Dudley and D-Von Dudley) defended the World Tag Team Championship against The Gangstas (New Jack and Mustafa) in a steel cage match. Buh Buh injured his legs by hitting a Bubba Cutter to New Jack from the top rope and Saed pinned him to win the title. After the match, Big Dick Dudley hit both members of Gangstas with a steel chair.

=== Main event match ===
The ECW representative team of Tommy Dreamer and The Sandman took on Rob Van Dam, Sabu and Jerry Lawler in a steel cage match. Rick Rude came out to compete as Dreamer and Sandman's third partner but he quickly turned on his team by hitting a clothesline to Dreamer which led to Beulah McGillicutty slapping him and Rude tossed her into the cage wall. Rude threw chairs into the cage and then locked the cage with RVD, Sabu and Lawler attacking Dreamer and Sandman inside the cage with the chairs until Taz made the save. RVD and Sabu escaped the cage but Lawler was trapped inside the cage and Taz knocked him out with a Tazmission until Rick Rude and The Triple Threat attacked him and knocked him out and Chris Candido applied Taz's own Tazmission on him.

== Aftermath ==
Four matches of the event aired with syndication on the July 24, 1997 episode of Hardcore TV.

Terry Funk and Shane Douglas continued their feud after Heat Wave over the World Heavyweight Championship. A match had been made between the two for the title at Hardcore Heaven. However, before the event, Funk lost the title to Sabu in a barbed wire match at Born to be Wired. As a result, Sabu defended the title against Funk and Douglas in a three-way dance at Hardcore Heaven.

This marked Mustafa's final appearance in ECW until 1999 as he quietly left the promotion after winning the World Tag Team Championship at Heat Wave. At the Hardcore Heaven pay-per-view event in August, the former champions Dudley Boyz were awarded the titles by default.

Tommy Dreamer continued his feud with Jerry Lawler, resulting in Dreamer wrestling Lawler in a match to settle the score at Hardcore Heaven.

Chris Candido's application of Tazmission on Taz at Heat Wave evolved into a rivalry between the two, leading to Candido receiving a shot against Taz for the World Television Championship at Hardcore Heaven.

== Results ==
No.	Results	Stipulations	Times
1	Mikey Whipwreck and Spike Dudley defeated PG-13 (J. C. Ice and Wolfie D) and Jason	Handicap match	10:13
2	Axl Rotten defeated Tracy Smothers	Singles match	9:08
3	John Kronus (with Perry Saturn) defeated Pablo Márquez	Singles match	11:34
4	Chris Candido and Bam Bam Bigelow defeated Chris Chetti and Balls Mahoney	Tag team match	13:51
5	Taz (c) defeated Lance Storm	Singles match for the ECW World Television Championship	12:23
6	Terry Funk (c) defeated Shane Douglas by disqualification	Singles match for the ECW World Heavyweight Championship	15:00
7	The Gangstas (Mustafa and New Jack) defeated The Dudley Boyz (Buh Buh Ray and D-Von) (c)	Steel Cage match for the ECW World Tag Team Championship	17:44
8	Jerry Lawler, Rob Van Dam, and Sabu vs. Rick Rude, The Sandman, and Tommy Dreamer ended in a no contest	Steel Cage match	32:24
(c) / – the champion(s) heading into the match
