= House Party (1999) =

1999 Extreme Championship Wrestling supercard event

- The ECW Arena.
- Promotion: Extreme Championship Wrestling
- Date: January 16, 1999 (aired January 22 and 29, 1999)
- City: Philadelphia, Pennsylvania, US
- Venue: ECW Arena
- Attendance: 1,700

Event chronology
← Previous; UltraClash	Next → Crossing the Line '99

House Party chronology
← Previous; 1998	Next → Final

House Party (1999) was the fourth and final House Party professional wrestling supercard event produced by Extreme Championship Wrestling (ECW). The event took place on January 16, 1999 in the ECW Arena in Philadelphia, Pennsylvania.

The event marked the return of tag team The Public Enemy to ECW after a three-year absence, having departed the company at the 1996 event.

Excerpts from House Party aired on episodes #300 and #301 of the syndicated television show ECW Hardcore TV on January 22 and 29, 1999.

== Event ==
=== Preliminary matches ===
The event kicked off with a two-on-one handicap match, pitting Spike Dudley against Danny Doring and Roadkill. Doring executed a Wham, Bam, Thank You Ma'am on Dudley and Roadkill followed with an Amish Splash but Dudley avoided it and then he nailed an Acid Drop to Doring onto Roadkill and pinned both men for the win.

Next, Chris Chetti took on Steve Corino. Chetti hit a springboard double jump moonsault on Corino for the win.

Next, Antifaz del Norte took on The Full Blooded Italians member Little Guido. FBI interfered in the match to attack Antifaz which brought out Nova to counter their interference. Nova knocked them out with a plancha and Antifaz hit a reverse suplex slam on Guido for the win.

In the following match, Super Crazy took on Yoshihiro Tajiri. Tajiri hit a brainbuster and attempted a missile dropkick but missed, allowing Crazy to hit a sitout powerbomb and a tornado DDT for the win.

Later, Tommy Dreamer took on Justin Credible and Lance Storm in a three-way dance. Storm and Credible double teamed Dreamer until Storm hit Credible with the cane and Dreamer pinned him with a roll-up for the first elimination. Dreamer nailed a Russian legsweep to Storm on the cane for the win.

Next, Rob Van Dam and Sabu defended the ECW World Tag Team Championship against The Hardcore Chair Swingin' Freaks (Axl Rotten and Balls Mahoney). RVD and Sabu drove Mahoney through a table with diving leg drops from opposite turnbuckles to retain the titles.

Taz was scheduled to defend the ECW World Heavyweight Championship against Chris Candido in the penultimate match but Shane Douglas took him out and demanded a title shot which Taz accepted. Taz applied a Tazmission on Douglas but he managed to fight out of it and then Taz hit a Hardway Taz-plex to retain the title.

=== Main event match ===
Sid defeated Skull Von Krush in the main event by chokeslamming him over the ropes through a table outside the ring and nailing a powerbomb in the ring. Sid proceeded to hit another powerbomb on Krush after the match.

This was followed by a segment in which The Dudleys and Joel Gertner mocked The Public Enemy by dressing up in the attire of Public Enemy until Public Enemy made their return to ECW to confront Dudleys but were triple teamed. New Jack came out apparently to fight Public Enemy due to his past grudge against them but he instead attacked Dudleys allowing Public Enemy to clear the ring of Dudleys.

== Reception ==
Arnold Furious of Wrestling Recaps appreciated the match of Super Crazy and Yoshihiro Tajiri as the best match of the show, while the World Heavyweight Championship match and the match between Chris Chetti and Steve Corino were considered the second and third best matches of the show respectively. He criticized the event, giving it a C rating.

== Results ==
No.	Results	Stipulations	Times
1	Spike Dudley defeated Danny Doring and Roadkill	Handicap match	3:17
2	Chris Chetti defeated Steve Corino	Singles match	9:24
3	Antifaz del Norte defeated Little Guido (with Sal E. Graziano, Tommy Rich, Tracey Smothers and Ulf Herman)	Singles match	7:52
4	Super Crazy defeated Yoshihiro Tajiri	Singles match	7:46
5	Tommy Dreamer defeated Justin Credible (with Dawn Marie, Jason, Jazz and Nicole Bass) and Lance Storm	Three-Way Dance	12:27
6	Rob Van Dam and Sabu (c) defeated The Hardcore Chair Swingin' Freaks (Axl Rotten and Balls Mahoney)	Tag team match for the ECW World Tag Team Championship	8:52
7	John Kronus defeated Ulf Herman	Singles match	—
8	Taz (c) vs. Chris Candido (with Tammy Lynn Sytch) ended in a no contest	Singles match for the ECW World Heavyweight Championship	—
9	Taz (c) defeated Shane Douglas (with Francine)	Singles match for the ECW World Heavyweight Championship	15:14
10	Sid defeated Skull Von Krush	Singles match	2:19
(c) / – the champion(s) heading into the match
