= House Party (1997) =

1997 Extreme Championship Wrestling supercard event

- The ECW Arena.
- Promotion: Extreme Championship Wrestling
- Date: January 11, 1997 (aired January 16 and 23, 1997)
- City: Philadelphia, Pennsylvania, United States
- Venue: ECW Arena
- Attendance: 1,400

Event chronology
← Previous; Holiday Hell	Next → Crossing the Line Again

House Party chronology
← Previous; 1996	Next → 1998

House Party, the second House Party professional wrestling supercard event produced by Extreme Championship Wrestling (ECW), took place on January 11, 1997 in the ECW Arena in Philadelphia, Pennsylvania in the United States. Excerpts from House Party aired on episodes #195 and #196 of the syndicated television show ECW Hardcore TV on January 16, 1997 and January 23, 1997.

House Party saw the official reformation of The Triple Threat by Shane Douglas, Brian Lee, and Chris Candido, as well as the debut of Rick Rude and the return of Pitbull #1 and Mike Awesome.

== Event ==
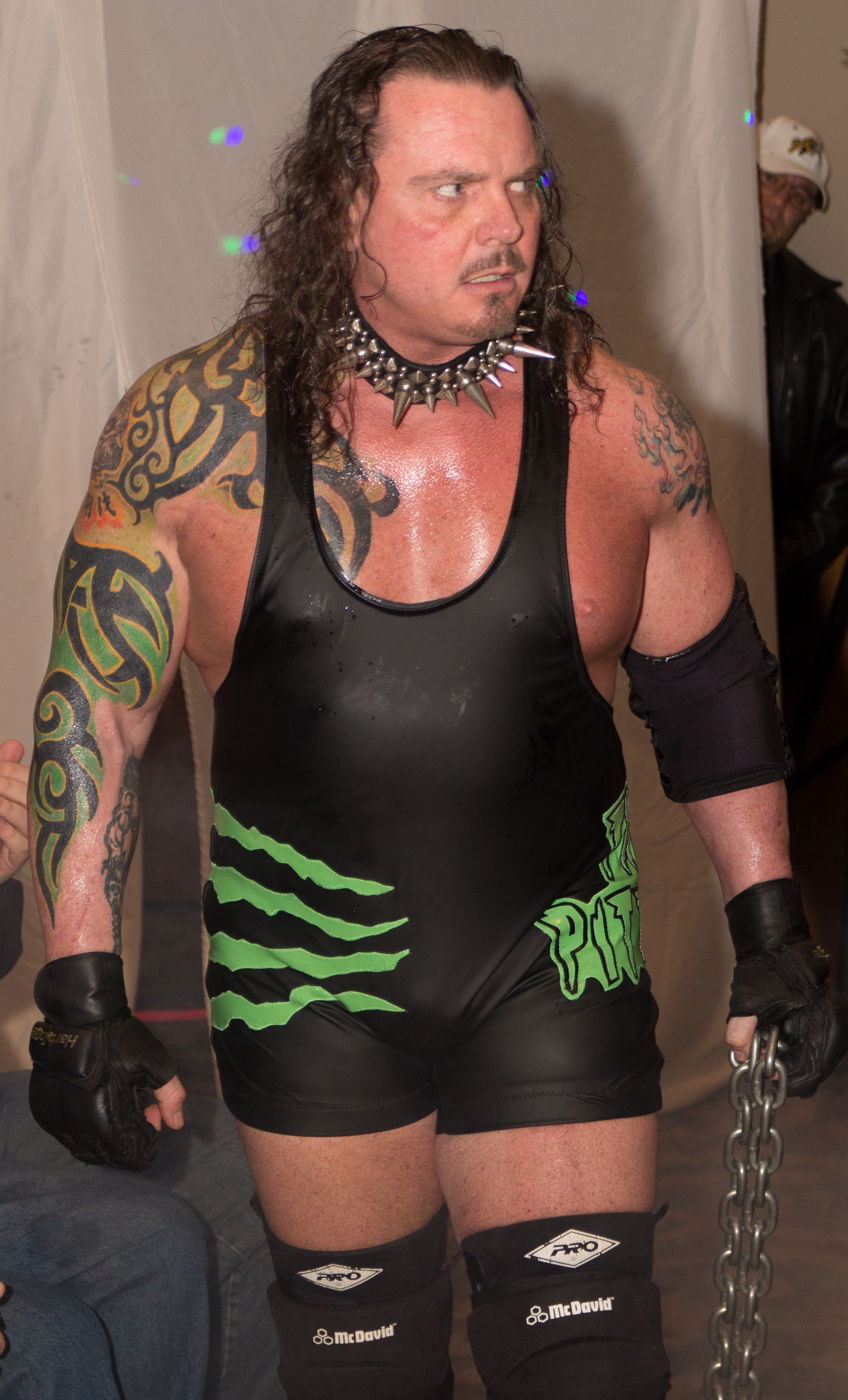
Pitbull #1 returned to ECW at House Party.

House Party was attended by approximately 1,400 people.

The event began with ECW World Heavyweight Champion Raven coming to the ring and demanding that The Sandman return his title belt, which he had stolen from Raven on the January 4, 1997 episode of ECW Hardcore TV. The Sandman responded by coming to the ring and brawling with Raven. This drew out the Blue World Order: Stevie Richards (Raven's long-term henchman, whose had turned on Raven in December 1996), The Blue Meanie, and Super Nova. After The Sandman blinded Raven by spitting beer in his eyes, Raven accidentally punched The Blue Meanie and Super Nova, provoking Richards to give him a Stevie Kick. Richards then handed The Sandman his Blue World Order t-shirt before leaving the ring. The Sandman continued to beat down Raven - including using the t-shirt to choke him - before leaving the ring still in possession of Raven's title belt.

In the opening bout of the show, Chris Candido defeated Louie Spicolli by sitting down on a sunset flip by Spicolli. After the match, Candido's allies Shane Douglas and Brian Lee attacked Spicolli until Pitbull #2 came to his assistance. Pitbull #2 no-sold Lee's Prime Time Slam and made Candido, Douglas, and Lee retreat from the ring.

In the second bout, Mikey Whipwreck defeated Spike Dudley by pinfall.

The third bout was a singles match between Balls Mahoney and the returning Mike Awesome, who had last appeared in ECW in March 1994. Awesome won the bout by pinfall.

The fourth bout saw ECW World Tag Team Champions The Eliminators defend their titles against Axl Rotten and D-Von Dudley. The Eliminators won the bout when they performed Total Elimination on Rotten, enabling Kronus to pin him.

The fifth bout was a tag team match pitting The Gangstas against Hell Bent and Whiskey Bound (Ricky Morton and Tommy Rich). During the match, Rich accidentally punched Morton. The Gangstas went on to win the match after New Jack gave Rich a 187 then pinned him.

Following the fifth bout, an impromptu match between Morton and Rich broke out after they argued about the miscommunication in the prior match. Rich won the match by pinning Morton with a roll-up.

Following the bout between Morton and Rich, commentator Joey Styles came to the ring to conduct interviews. As Tommy Dreamer - who was scheduled to face Shane Douglas later that night - watched from the stage of the ECW Arena, he was attacked by Shane Douglas, Chris Candido, and Brian Lee, who hit him with a trash can and threw him off the stage. This drew out Terry Funk to defend Dreamer. As Dreamer was removed from the ECW Arena on a stretcher, he was attacked by Tommy Rich.

Joey Styles subsequently interviewed Taz, who cut a promo on his rival Sabu, who was wrestling in Japan.

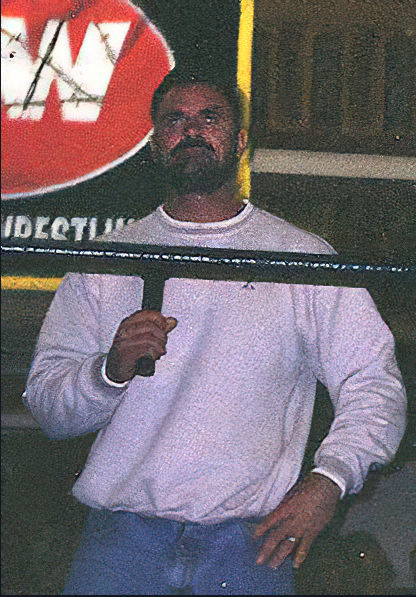
Rick Rude debuted in ECW at House Party.

The seventh bout was scheduled to be a singles match between Buh Buh Ray Dudley and Pitbull #2. Before the match began, Shane Douglas announced that he was putting a bounty on Pitbull #2. This prompted The Bad Crew, Axl Rotten, and D-Von Dudley to attempt to attack Pitbull #2, only to be driven off by Pitbull #2 and Dudley. Douglas himself then distracted Pitbull #2 and Dudley, allowing Brian Lee and Chris Candido to beat them down. Lee gave Pitbull #2 a Prime Time Slam from the ring through a table at ringside, then Douglas gave him a single arm DDT, resulting in Pitbull #2 being removed from the ring on a stretcher. Following the attack, Douglas, Candido, and Lee formally dubbed themselves "The Triple Threat".

The eighth bout was a singles match between Brian Lee and Terry Funk stemming from The Triple Threat's attack on Tommy Dreamer earlier in the show. The match was a wild brawl that saw the other members of The Triple Threat interfere to assist Lee. The match ended when Lee gave Funk a Prime Time Slam through a table at ringside, then pinned him in the ring. Following the match, Lee taunted Funk, claiming Funk's late father Dory was "turning over in his grave" and dubbing himself "the legend killer". After Funk attacked Lee, Douglas and Candido once again beat him down.

The main event was scheduled to be ECW World Television Champion Shane Douglas defending his title against Tommy Dreamer, but as Dreamer had been hospitalized following the attack by The Triple Threat earlier in the event, Douglas instead issued an open challenge. This drew out a masked wrestler whose voice was recognizable as Rick Rude. The masked man stated that his New Year's resolution was to "fuck with the Franchise" and announced a challenger for Douglas: his old rival, Pitbull #1, who had been inactive due to being injured by Douglas at Heat Wave in June 1996. After Pitbull #1 stormed the ring, Douglas retreated and was counted out (the title therefore did not change hands). Following the match, several members of the roster came to the ring to celebrate the return of Pitbull #1.

== Results ==
No.	Results	Stipulations	Times
1	Chris Candido defeated Louie Spicolli by pinfall	Singles match	—
2	Mikey Whipwreck defeated Spike Dudley by pinfall	Singles match	—
3	Mike Awesome defeated Balls Mahoney by pinfall	Singles match	—
4	The Eliminators (Kronus and Saturn) (c) defeated Axl Rotten and D-Von Dudley by pinfall	Tag team match for the ECW World Tag Team Championship	05:25
5	The Gangstas (Mustafa and New Jack) defeated Hell Bent and Whiskey Bound (Ricky Morton and Tommy Rich) by pinfall	Tag team match	—
6	Tommy Rich defeated Ricky Morton by pinfall	Singles match	—
7	Buh Buh Ray Dudley vs. Pitbull #2 ended in a no contest	Singles match	—
8	Brian Lee defeated Terry Funk by pinfall	Singles match	15:29
9	Pitbull #1 defeated Shane Douglas (c) (with Francine) by count out	Singles match for the ECW World Television Championship	—
(c) / – the champion(s) heading into the match
