= House Party (1996) =

1996 Extreme Championship Wrestling supercard event

- The ECW Arena.
- Promotion: Extreme Championship Wrestling
- Date: January 5, 1996 (aired January 23, 1996)
- City: Philadelphia, Pennsylvania, United States
- Venue: ECW Arena
- Attendance: 1,150

Event chronology
← Previous; Holiday Hell	Next → Big Apple Blizzard Blast

House Party chronology
← Previous; First	Next → 1997

House Party was the first House Party professional wrestling supercard event produced by Extreme Championship Wrestling (ECW). The event took place on January 5, 1996 in the ECW Arena in Philadelphia, Pennsylvania in the United States.

House Party featured the final appearance of tag team the Public Enemy, who had signed contracts with World Championship Wrestling, until their return in January 1999, as well as the final appearance of Tony Stetson. The event also saw the debut of future ECW mainstay Rob Van Dam, along with the surprise return of Shane Douglas from the World Wrestling Federation (WWF).

Several matches from the event aired on the January 23, 1996 episode of ECW Hardcore TV. In 2019, the event was added to the WWE Network. The bout between the Public Enemy and the Gangstas appeared on the compilation DVDs Blood Sport – ECW's Most Violent Matches (2006) and ECW Unreleased Vol. 2 (2013), while the bout between Van Dam and Axl Rotten was included in the 2005 DVD Rob Van Dam – One of a Kind.

== Event ==
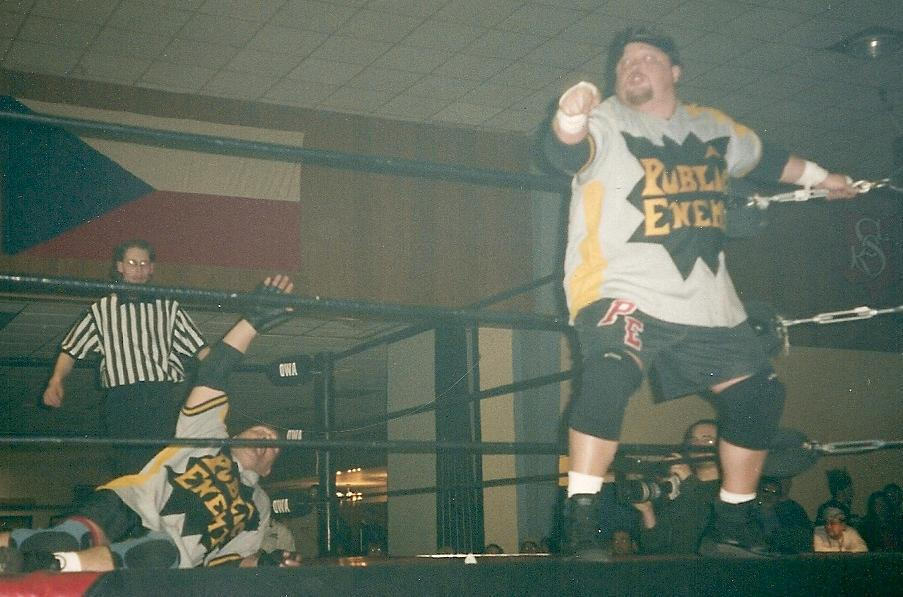
The Public Enemy competed in their last ECW match in the main event of House Party.

The event kicked off with an introduction by Joey Styles, which was interrupted by Bill Alfonso, who praised his client Taz. Taz came to the ring but soon Tod Gordon and 911 also showed up. 911 and Taz were about to get involved in a confrontation until several wrestlers separated the two, during which Taz hit a Hardway Taz-Plex on Pablo Márquez. 911 chased after Taz until the Eliminators (John Kronus and Perry Saturn) attacked 911 and executed a Total Elimination and then Rey Misterio Jr. made the rescue for 911 to begin the opening match of the show.

Taz interfered in the match twice by choking out 911 with a towel. As the match continued, 911 recovered and Misterio delivered a diving hurricanrana on Saturn by leaping off 911's shoulders for the win. After the match, Eliminators attacked their opponents and nailed a Total Elimination to Misterio while 911 brawled with Taz in the aisle. The Pitbulls and Francine tried to make the save but Francine sustained a Total Elimination and Pitbulls tossed Jason onto the Eliminators outside the ring.

In the second bout, Rob Van Dam made his ECW debut against Axl Rotten. RVD delivered a split-legged moonsault to Rotten and then pinned him for the win.

In the third bout, Mikey Whipwreck defended the ECW World Television Championship against 2 Cold Scorpio. The referee was knocked out after Scorpio executed a superplex on Whipwreck. Raven interfered in the match and hit a DDT on Whipwreck. Scorpio took advantage by executing a powerbomb and a Drop the Bomb on Whipwreck, then pinned him to win the title.

In the fourth bout, Hack Meyers took on Taz. Taz dominated Meyers with a series of Tazplexes before applying a Tazmission for a submission victory.

In the fifth bout, Buh Buh Ray Dudley took on Jimmy Del Ray. Mr. Hughes distracted Dudley as he was about to perform a Buh Buh Bomb and Del Ray tried to backdrop him but Buh Buh countered with a DDT then pinned Del Ray for the win.

After the match, Hughes brought out Shane Douglas back to ECW, who confronted Dudley. This was followed by a segment which featured a key development in the feud between Raven and Tommy Dreamer, which had begun upon Raven's debut in ECW one year prior. During the segment, Raven's girlfriend and valet, Beulah McGillicutty, unexpectedly announced that she was pregnant, and that the father of the baby was not Raven, but his arch-rival, Dreamer. After Raven began throttling her, Dreamer stormed to the ring and decisively beat down Raven and his henchmen, Stevie Richards and the Blue Meanie, before embracing McGillicutty.

In the seventh bout, the Sandman defended the ECW World Heavyweight Championship against Konnan. Both men caned each other repeatedly and fell down and the referee began counting to ten until Woman revived Sandman while Konnan failed to answer the referee's ten count. As a result, Sandman retained the title.

The eighth bout was a singles match between Sabu and Stevie Richards. Sabu executed an Arabian Facebuster on Richards and then pinned him for the win.

The main event was a street fight between the departing Public Enemy (Johnny Grunge and Rocco Rock) and The Gangstas (Mustafa and New Jack). The Public Enemy delivered a Drive-By to Mustafa and then pinned him for the win.

== Reception ==
The Inside Pulse staff wrote "While this show isn’t exactly out of the ordinary Great, it has a lot of solid bouts and good angles. This would be the start of, in my opinion, the greatest year in ECW history. It offered a little bit of everything for the fans." The World Television Championship match was named the match of the night, due to having "good heat, told a great story and gelled very well together in a good back & forth match", while the main event match and the penultimate match were tied at second place.

Wrestling 20 Years Ago staff rated the event 7 out of 10, saying "An entertaining enough, busy enough show that you'll get your times worth. I'd say seek out the opening 20 minutes, the Raven/Dreamer angle and the Sabu/Richards match if you're looking for specific stuff, but this is a decent show throughout."

== Results ==
No.	Results	Stipulations	Times
1	911 and Rey Misterio Jr. defeated the Eliminators (Kronus and Saturn) (with Jason) by pinfall	Tag team match	6:49
2	Rob Van Dam defeated Axl Rotten by pinfall	Singles match	6:11
3	2 Cold Scorpio (with Woman) defeated Mikey Whipwreck (c) by pinfall	Singles match for the ECW World Television Championship	16:47
4	Taz (with Bill Alfonso) defeated Hack Myers by submission	Singles match	3:41
5	Buh Buh Ray Dudley (with Big Dick Dudley, Chubby Dudley, Dances with Dudley and Sign Guy Dudley) defeated Jimmy Del Ray (with Mr. Hughes) by pinfall	Singles match	—
6	The Bad Crew (Bad Crew #1 and Bad Crew #2) vs. J. T. Smith and Tony Stetson ended in a no contest	Tag team match	—
7	The Sandman (c) (with Woman) defeated Konnan by pinfall	Singles match for the ECW World Heavyweight Championship	14:01
8	Sabu (with Paul E. Dangerously) defeated Stevie Richards (with the Blue Meanie) by pinfall	Singles match	14:31
9	The Public Enemy (Johnny Grunge and Rocco Rock) defeated the Gangstas (Mustafa and New Jack) by pinfall	Tag team street fight	13:41
(c) / – the champion(s) heading into the match
