= House Party (1998) =

1998 Extreme Championship Wrestling supercard event

- The ECW Arena.
- Promotion: Extreme Championship Wrestling
- Date: January 10, 1998 (aired January 14 and 21, 1998)
- City: Philadelphia, Pennsylvania, United States
- Venue: ECW Arena
- Attendance: 1,650

Event chronology
← Previous; Better Than Ever	Next → Hostile City Showdown

House Party chronology
← Previous; 1997	Next → 1999

House Party - the third House Party professional wrestling supercard event produced by Extreme Championship Wrestling (ECW) - took place on January 10, 1998 in the ECW Arena in Philadelphia, Pennsylvania in the United States. Excerpts from House Party aired on episodes #247 and #248 of the syndicated television show ECW Hardcore TV on January 14 and 21, 1998, while the full event was later released on VHS and DVD.

The main event of House Party, a Stairway to Hell match between Sabu and The Sandman, gained a degree of notoriety after Sabu sustained a broken jaw upon executing a plancha and inadvertently striking the guard rail with his chin. Sabu continue to wrestle for several minutes, at one point wrapping his heavily bleeding jaw in duct tape. The event also featured the return of 2 Cold Scorpio to ECW for one night only.

== Event ==
In the opening bout, the team of The Hardcore Chair Swingin' Freaks (Axl Rotten and Balls Mahoney) and Tommy Dreamer faced The Full Blooded Italians (Little Guido, Tommy Rich and Tracy Smothers) in a six-man tag team match. Towards the end of the match, an argument occurred between referees Jeff Jones and Jim Molineaux, culminating in Molineaux performing a DDT on Jones and pinning him, with Mahoney, Rotten, Dreamer, and Dreamer's valet Beulah McGillicutty counting the pin.

The second bout was a singles match between Chris Candido and Jerry Lynn. Lynn blocked a superplex attempt by Candido and fell down on Candido's injured arm, then applied a cross armbar, forcing Candido to submit.

The third bout was a singles match between the Michinoku Pro Wrestling wrestlers Gran Hamada and Gran Naniwa (substituting for Terry Boy). Hamada delivered a tornado DDT to Naniwa for the win. The match continued as Hamada hit a diving hurricanrana to gain a second pin for the real win.

The fourth bout was a singles match between Al Snow and Amish Roadkill (substituting for Paul Diamond, who was feigning an injury). Before the match, the ECW ring crew handed out a large number of styrofoam mannequin heads in reference to Snow's gimmick, which saw him talk to a mannequin head. After Paul Diamond and Chastity attempted to interfere in the match, Snow gave both of them Snow Plows. Snow then gave Amish Roadkill a diving headbutt and pinned him.

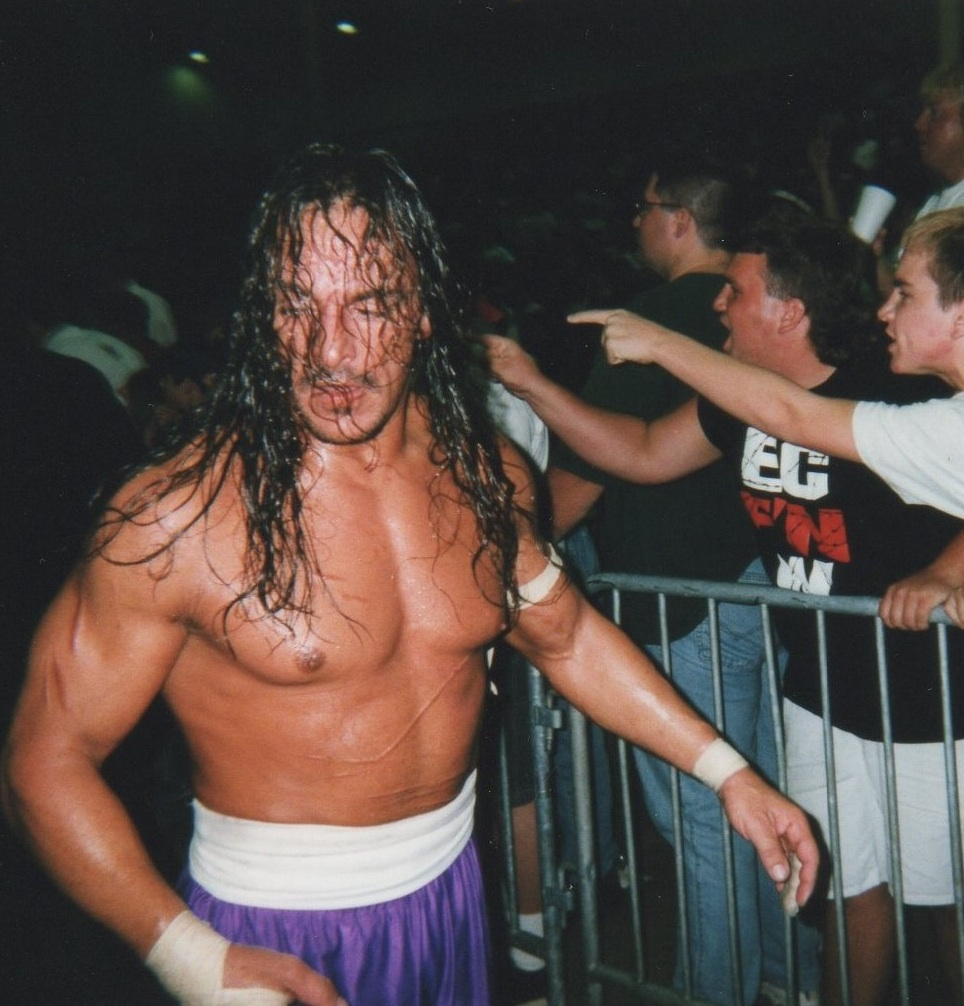
Sabu suffered a broken jaw in the main event of House Party.

The fifth bout was a singles match between The Great Sasuke and Justin Credible. After Sasuke injured his knee by missing a plancha due to Jason tripping him, Credible began targeting his knee. Credible went on to win the match after giving Sasuke That's Incredible then pinning him.

The sixth bout was a singles match between Bam Bam Bigelow and Rob Van Dam. Interference by Tammy Lynn Sytch, Francine, Chris Candido and Shane Douglas distracted Bigelow enough for Van Dam to give him a missile dropkick followed by a Five Star Frog Splash and then pin him.

After the match, ECW World Television Champion Taz was interviewed in the ring by Joey Styles until Lance Wright interrupted him and introduced the World Wrestling Federation wrestler (and ECW alumnus) Flash Funk as an impromptu challenger to Taz. Funk turned on Wright, telling Styles to introduce him using his former ring name, 2 Cold Scorpio. 2 Cold Scorpio gave Taz a 450° splash but failed to cover Taz, giving Taz time to rally and apply a Tazmission to 2 Cold Scorpio for a submission victory.

In the penultimate match, The Gangstanators and Spike Dudley took on The Dudley Brothers in a rematch from Better Than Ever. The match ended when John Kronus was distracted by Sign Guy Dudley and Joel Gertner, allowing Buh Buh Ray Dudley and D-Von Dudley to hit a 3D on Kronus and then pin him.

The main event was a Stairway to Hell match between Sabu and The Sandman. During the match, The Sandman retrieved a reel of barbed wire that was suspended from the ceiling of the arena. Towards the end of the match Sabu suffered a legitimate broken jaw after accidentally striking his chin on the guard rail while performing a plancha. After Sabu's jaw began bleeding heavily, his manager Bill Alfonso attempted to close the wound using duct tape. The Sandman went on to win the match by pinfall after hitting Sabu with a Singapore cane.

== Reception ==
Scott Keith, writing for 411Mania.com, praised the Stairway to Hell match but overall recommended to avoid the show.

== Results ==
No.	Results	Stipulations	Times
1	The Hardcore Chair Swingin' Freaks (Axl Rotten and Balls Mahoney) and Tommy Dreamer (with Beulah McGillicutty) defeated The Full Blooded Italians (Little Guido, Tommy Rich and Tracy Smothers) by pinfall Referee Jim Molineaux pinned referee Jeff Jones	Six-man tag team match	13:49
2	Jerry Lynn defeated Chris Candido via submission	Singles match	10:47
3	Gran Hamada defeated Gran Naniwa by pinfall	Singles match	10:41
4	Al Snow defeated Amish Roadkill (with Chastity and Paul Diamond) by pinfall	Singles match	4:07
5	Justin Credible (with Jason and Nicole Bass) defeated The Great Sasuke by pinfall	Singles match	12:58
6	Rob Van Dam (with Bill Alfonso) defeated Bam Bam Bigelow by pinfall	Singles match	16:35
7	Taz (c) defeated 2 Cold Scorpio by submission	Singles match for the ECW World Television Championship	11:19
8	The Dudley Brothers (Big Dick Dudley, Buh Buh Ray Dudley and D-Von Dudley), with Joel Gertner and Sign Guy Dudley) defeated The Gangstanators (John Kronus and New Jack) and Spike Dudley by pinfall	Six-man tag team match	8:56
9	The Sandman defeated Sabu (with Bill Alfonso) by pinfall	Stairway to Hell match	17:48
(c) / – the champion(s) heading into the match
