= ECW House Party =

House Party
- Promotions: Extreme Championship Wrestling
- First event: House Party (1996)
- Last event: House Party (1999)

House Party was a professional wrestling supercard event produced by Extreme Championship Wrestling (ECW). It was held annually in January from 1996 to 1999. The name of the event was a reference to the tag team The Public Enemy, who departed ECW after wrestling in the main event of the inaugural event.

== Dates and venues ==
Event	Date	City	Venue	Main Event
House Party (1996)	January 5, 1996	ECW Arena	Philadelphia, Pennsylvania	The Public Enemy (Johnny Grunge and Rocco Rock) vs. The Gangstas (Mustafa Saed and New Jack) in a street fight
House Party (1997)	January 11, 1997	ECW Arena	Philadelphia, Pennsylvania	Shane Douglas (c) vs. Pitbull #1 for the ECW World Television Championship
House Party (1998)	January 10, 1998	ECW Arena	Philadelphia, Pennsylvania	The Sandman vs. Sabu in a Stairway to Hell match
House Party (1999)	January 16, 1999	ECW Arena	Philadelphia, Pennsylvania	Sid vs. Skull Von Krush
(c) – refers to the champion(s) heading into the match
