= Gangstanators =

Professional wrestling tag team

The Gangstanators

Tag team
- Members: New Jack; John Kronus
- Billed heights: New Jack: 6 ft 0 in (1.83 m); Kronus: 6 ft 3 in (1.91 m)
- Combined billed weight: 513 lb (233 kg; 36.6 st)
- Debut: 1997
- Disbanded: 1998

The Gangstanators were a professional wrestling tag team in Extreme Championship Wrestling. The team consisted of New Jack, formerly of The Gangstas, and John Kronus, formerly of The Eliminators, with "Gangstanators" being a portmanteau of the names of their respective former tag teams.

== History ==
New Jack and Kronus joined forces after New Jack's partner Mustapha Saed and Kronus's partner Perry Saturn both left ECW. Their first match together was on August 21, 1997, when they defeated ECW World Tag Team Champions the Dudley Boyz (Bubba Ray Dudley and D-Von Dudley) in a non-title match. This led to a series of matches between the teams, during which New Jack and Kronus defeated the Dudleys for the title belts at ECW's As Good as it Gets event on September 20, 1997 in Philadelphia, Pennsylvania. They successfully defended the belts against the Dudleys and the team of Axl Rotten and Balls Mahoney over the following month. The Gangstanators held the title until October 18 of that year, when they lost to The Full Blooded Italians (Little Guido and Tracy Smothers) in Philadelphia.

After losing the title, The Gangstanators continued their feud with the Dudleys. Spike Dudley also entered the feud on the side of the New Jack and Kronus, fighting against his kayfabe brothers. He joined The Gangstanators in six-man matches and sometimes took Kronus' place as New Jack's partner. As the year went on, Kronus, New Jack, and Spike Dudley focused more on their singles careers, although they still teamed with each other on occasion.

The team eventually disbanded, with Kronus leaving ECW for Xtreme Pro Wrestling. New Jack remained in ECW, competing as a singles wrestler in ECW until the promotion declared bankruptcy in April 2001.

=== Reunion ===
The Gangstanators reunited for one night at the ECW reunion show Hardcore Homecoming on June 10, 2005. Kronus had been scheduled to reunite with Saturn, but Saturn was injured and could not attend the event. As a result, New Jack and Kronus teamed together to face The Bad Breed (Axl and Ian Rotten) in an impromptu brawl which ended when New Jack leapt from scaffolding and drove a prone Ian Rotten through a table.

== Deaths ==
Kronus died of heart failure on July 18, 2007 and New Jack died of a heart attack on May 14, 2021.

== Championships and accomplishments ==
- Extreme Championship Wrestling
  - ECW World Tag Team Championship (1 time)

== See also ==
- The Eliminators
- The Gangstas
