= Rocco Rock =

American professional wrestler (1953–2002)

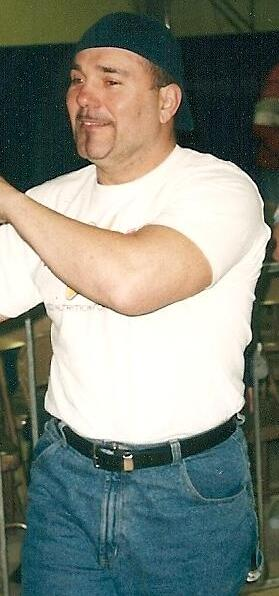
- Rocco Rock in March 2002

Personal information
- Born: Theodore James Petty; September 1, 1953 Woodbridge Township, New Jersey, U.S.
- Died: September 21, 2002 (aged 49) Philadelphia, Pennsylvania, U.S.
- Education: Rutgers University

Professional wrestling career
- Ring name(s): Antonino Rocca Jr. Cheetah Kid; Colonel DeKlerk; The Executioner; Flyboy Rocco; The Leopard Mask; Mario Savoldi; Rocco Rock; The Rock
- Billed height: 6 ft 2 in (188 cm)
- Billed weight: 250 lb (113 kg)
- Billed from: Compton, California; South Africa (as Colonel DeKlerk)
- Trained by: Afa Anoa'i
- Debut: 1978

Theodore James Petty (September 1, 1953 – September 21, 2002) was an American professional wrestler, better known by the ring name "Flyboy" Rocco Rock. Rock is best known for his appearances in Eastern Championship Wrestling / Extreme Championship Wrestling (ECW), World Championship Wrestling (WCW), and the World Wrestling Federation (WWF) alongside Johnny Grunge as the Public Enemy during the 1990s. He was a four-time ECW World Tag Team Champion, a one-time WCW World Tag Team Champion, and a one-time NWA World Tag Team Champion.

== Early life ==
Petty was born on September 1, 1953. Raised in Middlesex, New Jersey, he attended Middlesex High School, where he competed in baseball, football and wrestling. He graduated from Rutgers University with a degree in nutrition. while attending Rutgers, he took part in collegiate wrestling. He went on to have a brief boxing career.

== Professional wrestling career ==
=== Early career (1978–1993) ===
Following his boxing career, Petty trained as a professional wrestler under Afa Anoa'i. He debuted in 1978, working on the independent circuit in the northeastern United States as the masked "Cheetah Kid".

Petty worked in the American Wrestling Association from 1985 to 1988.

In March 1990, Petty toured Japan with New Japan Pro-Wrestling as part of its "Big Fight Series". During the tour, he teamed with Pegasus Kid and faced opponents such as Jushin Thunder Liger, Takashi Iizuka, and Kengo Kimura. Upon returning to the United States, he wrestled for the Philadelphia-based Tri-State Wrestling Alliance, winning its Brass Knuckles Championship. In June 1990, he began appearing with World Championship Wrestling (WCW), initially as "Cheetah Kid", then as "Mario Savoldi", then finally as the faux-South African "Colonel DeKlerk". As "Colonel DeKlerk", Petty teamed with Sergeant Krueger to defeat the Beast and Kaluha at Clash of the Champions XIII in November 1990, then teamed with Krueger in a loss to the Steiner Brothers at Starrcade '90: Collision Course in December 1990.

In March 1991, Petty appeared with the Universal Wrestling Federation, taking part in a taping for the Fury Hour television show.

In June 1992, Petty toured Japan with W*ING, competing in a tournament for the W*ING World Junior Heavyweight Championship. After both he and Jimmy Backlund finished the tournament with three points, they faced one another in a deciding match that was won by Backlund.

In January 1993, Petty wrestled two matches for the World Wrestling Federation as "Cheetah Kid"; the second of them was a dark match at the first ever Monday Night Raw taping. Later that month, he wrestled two matches for World Championship Wrestling as "the Executioner", including a bout against 2 Cold Scorpio that aired on WCW WorldWide. In April and June 1993, Petty toured Austria and Germany with the World Wrestlings Superstars promotion.

=== Eastern Championship Wrestling / Extreme Championship Wrestling (1993–1996) ===
In September 1993, Petty (as "Rocco Rock") and Johnny Grunge began wrestling regularly for the Philadelphia, Pennsylvania-based promotion Eastern Championship Wrestling (ECW) as the Public Enemy. They made their debut at UltraClash, defeating Ian Rotten and Jason Knight. At NWA Bloodfest the following month, they defeated the Bad Breed and Badd Company in a triangle cage match. Over the following months, they feuded with Badd Company, defeating them in a "South Philly Hood" match at November to Remember. At Holiday Hell: the Body Count in December 1993, Pat Tanaka (one-half of Badd Company) defeated Rock in a "Body Count" match, marking the end of the feud. At The Night the Line Was Crossed in February 1994, the Public Enemy defeated the Bruise Brothers in a "no rules" match. On March 6, 1994, they defeated Kevin Sullivan and the Tazmaniac to win the ECW Tag Team Championship.

At Ultimate Jeopardy in March 1994, the Public Enemy teamed with Shane Douglas and Mr. Hughes to face Sullivan, the Tazmaniac, Road Warrior Hawk, and ECW Heavyweight Champion Terry Funk in an "Ultimate Jeopardy steel cage match". Each participant had a stipulation which would be implemented if they were defeated; if the Public Enemy were defeated, they would be forced to stop teaming together. Douglas won the bout for his team by pinning Funk. At When Worlds Collide in May 1994, the Public Enemy again teamed with Douglas and Hughes, losing to J. T. Smith and the Bruise Brothers in a handicap elimination match. At the same event, the Public Enemy attacked Terry Funk after being paid by Paul E. Dangerously (the manager of Funk's rival Sabu), causing Funk to declare he would get revenge on the Public Enemy. At Hostile City Showdown in June 1994, the Public Enemy wrestled Terry Funk and his brother Dory Funk Jr. to a no contest. At Heatwave '94: the Battle for the Future in July 1994, the Public Enemy defeated the Funk brothers in a barbed wire match. At Hardcore Heaven in August 1994, the Public Enemy successfully defended their titles against the Bad Breed. Later that evening, the Public Enemy interfered in the main event bout between Terry Funk and Cactus Jack. As the four men brawled, Funk called for a fan to toss him a steel chair. This resulted in multiple fans hurtling chairs into the ring, with Rock and Grunge being buried under a large pile of steel chairs.

The Public Enemy's first reign as ECW Tag Team Champions ended the following month at the NWA World Title Tournament event, where Cactus Jack and Mikey Whipwreck (substituting for Terry Funk, who had temporarily departed the promotion) defeated them in an upset. Around this time, Eastern Championship Wrestling was rebranded "Extreme Championship Wrestling". In August 1994, Rock (as "the Cheetah Kid") wrestled two matches for the World Wrestlings Superstars promotion in Vienna, Austria. Back in ECW, the Public Enemy continued their feud with Cactus Jack and Whipwreck, culminating in a Brawl Game match at November to Remember where they regained the titles (now known as the ECW World Tag Team Championship). For the remainder of the year, they successfully defended the titles against challengers including Cactus Jack and Whipwreck; the Bad Breed; and 2 Cold Scorpio and Ron Simmons.

The Public Enemy's second reign as ECW World Tag Team Champions ran until February 1995, where they lost to Sabu and the Tazmaniac at Double Tables. In March 1995, they made a short tour of Japan with Wrestling International New Generations, where they primarily faced the Pitbulls is a series of gimmick matches. In April 1995 at Three Way Dance, the Public Enemy won the ECW World Tag Team Championship for a third time, defeating Chris Benoit and Dean Malenko and Rick Steiner (substituting for Sabu) and the Tazmaniac in a three way dance. Immediately following their victory, the Public Enemy were attacked by the Pitbulls, beginning a feud between the two teams. At Hostile City Showdown later that month, the Public Enemy defeated the Pitbulls to retain their titles. Over the following months, the Public Enemy defended their titles against the Pitbulls in a series of matches, including dog collar matches and baseball bat matches. Their reign finally ended in July 1995 at Mountain Top Madness when they lost to Raven and Stevie Richards following interference from the Gangstas (Mustafa and New Jack).

The Public Enemy subsequently began feuding with the Gangstas, losing to them in a cage match at Heat Wave in July 1995 and in a stretcher match at Wrestlepalooza. At Gangstas Paradise in September 1995, the Public Enemy teamed with Mikey Whipwreck to defeat 2 Cold Scorpio (substituting for Mustafa), New Jack, and the Sandman. In October 1995 at South Philly Jam, the Public Enemy defeated Raven and Stevie Richards and the Gangstas in a three way dance to win their fourth and final ECW World Tag Team Championship. Their reign ended later that month when 2 Cold Scorpio defeated Rock in a bout where Scorpio's ECW World Television Championship and the Public Enemy's ECW World Tag Team Championship were both on the line. In November 1995 at November to Remember, the Public Enemy unsuccessfully challenged 2 Cold Scorpio and the Sandman for the ECW World Tag Team Championship. The following day, the Public Enemy wrestled a dark match for the World Wrestling Federation at its Survivor Series pay-per-view, unsuccessfully challenging The Smoking Gunns for the WWF World Tag Team Championship.

At December to Dismember in December 1995, the Public Enemy teamed with the Pitbulls and Tommy Dreamer to defeat Raven, Stevie Richards, the Eliminators, and the Heavenly Bodies in an Ultimate Jeopardy steel cage match (with a stipulation that if the Public Enemy were defeated they would need to wrestle one another). At Holiday Hell later that month, the Public Enemy lost to the Gangstas. In January 1996 at House Party, the Public Enemy made their final appearance with ECW before leaving to join World Championship Wrestling, defeating the Gangstas in the main event. Pro Wrestling Illustrated ranked Rock #90 in the 1995 PWI 500 (an index of the world's top 500 wrestlers) - his highest ever placing.

=== World Championship Wrestling (1996–1998) ===
By late-1995, both WCW and the WWF were courting the Public Enemy. At the outset of 1996, the Public Enemy signed with WCW. They debuted on the January 15, 1996 episode of WCW Monday Nitro, defeating the American Males. Soon after arriving, they began a long-running feud with the Nasty Boys. At Clash of the Champions XXXII, the two teams wrestled one another to a double disqualification. At SuperBrawl VI in February 1996, the Nasty Boys defeated the Public Enemy in a falls count anywhere match. At Bash at the Beach in July 1996, the Nasty Boys defeated the Public Enemy in a dog collar match.

On the September 23, 1996 episode of WCW Monday Nitro, the Public Enemy defeated Harlem Heat to win the WCW World Tag Team Championship. Their reign lasted until the October 1, 1996 episode of WCW Saturday Night, where Harlem Heat regained the titles. The Public Enemy continued to compete in WCW's tag team division for the remainder of the year. In December 1996, they took part in WCW's "Christmas Brawl" tour of Germany.

In early 1997, the Public Enemy had a series of matches against the Faces of Fear and Harlem Heat, culminating in a triangle match at SuperBrawl VII that was won by the Public Enemy. At Uncensored in March 1997, Harlem Heat defeated the Public Enemy. At Spring Stampede in April 1997, the Public Enemy defeated Jeff Jarrett and Steve McMichael. At Slamboree in May 1997, the Public Enemy defeated Harlem Heat in a dark match. For the remainder of the year, the Public Enemy faced teams such as Harlem Heat; the Faces of Fear; the Steiner Brothers; High Voltage. At World War 3 in November 1997, Rock competed in the titular three ring battle royal which was won by Scott Hall.

Throughout 1998, the Public Enemy continued to wrestle on WCW WorldWide, WCW Pro, WCW Saturday Night, and WCW Monday Nitro, facing tams such as the Outsiders; the Armstrongs (Scott Armstrong and Steve Armstrong); Disorderly Conduct (Mean Mike and Tough Tom); High Voltage; and the Barbarian and Hugh Morrus. In July 1998, they began a short feud with the Dancing Fools that culminated in a street fight at Road Wild in August 1998 that was won by the Public Enemy.

The Public Enemy left WCW in September 1998. They spent the next few months wrestling for the Ohio-based Championship Wrestling promotion, facing the Bushwhackers in a series of matches.

=== Return to Extreme Championship Wrestling (1999) ===
At ECW's House Party 1999 on January 16, The Public Enemy made a long-awaited and much-hyped return to the ECW Arena, in order to answer the challenge of the Dudley Boyz. At the time, they were still under contract to WCW, but they successfully brawled (with assistance from New Jack) with the Dudleys. Following the showdown, Johnny Grunge grabbed the microphone and claimed that the past three years had been a "rollercoaster ride" for the team, and that "if you opened up our chest and looked at our hearts, there's only one thing stamped on it, and that's ECW!" Grunge further thanked the Dudleys for house-sitting "the house that the Public Enemy built" while they were gone, and then invited everyone in attendance to join them in the ring for a post-show celebration.

Their next scheduled appearance was at Crossing the Line '99 on February 12 in Queens, New York against the Dudleys, which they cancelled due to negotiating with the WWF. The team was buried on the February 20 edition of ECW Hardcore TV as being cowards who ran from a fight. Footage of the Dudleys hitting big moves on the team at an event in Detroit was shown, with a headline stating "Breaking News: The Dudleys Destroy Public Enemy." Two days later, the team would make their WWF debut.

=== World Wrestling Federation (1999) ===
The Public Enemy signed with the World Wrestling Federation in early 1999. They were not accepted "backstage" by veteran WWF wrestlers and backstage personnel due to animosity over the fact that the Public Enemy chose WCW over the WWF when the two companies were pursuing the tag team in late 1995. Rocco Rock was also forced to change his name and go by the shortened name "Flyboy Rocco", in order not to "cause confusion" with The Rock. They made their WWF debut on the February 22, 1999, episode of Raw is War, defeating The Brood by disqualification.

On the March 2, 1999, episode of Sunday Night Heat in Pittsburgh, the Public Enemy lost to the Acolytes in a squash match. In 2013, John "Bradshaw" Layfield elaborated that much of the animosity was due to them being brought into the company by Terry Taylor, who had his own backstage issues with much of the wrestlers, including the Acolytes. They had also desired to change the planned finish of the squash match, which involved them being driven through tables by the Acolytes. The Acolytes were instructed only to ensure that they go through with the planned finish of the match, leading to the match to be turned into a legitimate shoot, with The Acolytes dominating Public Enemy for the entirety of the four-minute match. Following the Public Enemy's subsequent release, the APA claimed that they "ran The Public Enemy out" of the WWF. They said they could do the same to another famous ECW tag team (the Dudley Boyz); after the Dudley Boyz succeeded in the feud, it was commonly referred to as "Passing the Acolyte Test" since the Dudley Boyz did get over after a feud with the APA while The Public Enemy failed.

The Public Enemy wrestled their final match for the WWF on March 30, 1999, in a match taped for Shotgun Saturday Night, losing to the Hardy Boyz via disqualification. The match was aired on television on April 10, 1999. Shortly after airing, both members of Public Enemy were released in mid-April 1999.

=== Return to World Championship Wrestling (1999) ===
After leaving the WWF, the Public Enemy returned to WCW in July 1999 at the Bash at the Beach pay-per-view, taking part in the "Junkyard Hardcore Invitational" that was won by Fit Finlay. Over the following weeks, the Public Enemy wrestled in the tag team division, facing teams such as the Insane Clown Posse; Chris Benoit and Perry Saturn; and Barry Windham and Curt Hennig. On the August 5, 1999 episode of WCW Thunder, Rock lost to Goldberg. They made their final appearance with WCW on the August 19, 1999 episode of WCW Thunder, losing to Sid Vicious in a handicap match.

=== Late career (1999–2002) ===
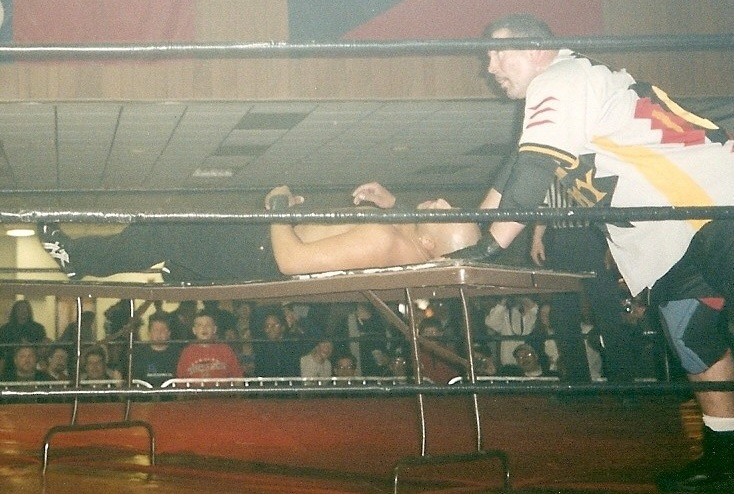
Rocco Rock in March 2002

After leaving WCW in late-1999, the Public Enemy began wrestling on the independent circuit. In June 1999, they briefly held the NWA World Tag Team Championship. From December 1999 to May 2000, they appeared with Xtreme Pro Wrestling. In July and August 2000, they wrestled in Perth and Sydney for the Australian i-Generation Superstars of Wrestling promotion, briefly holding the i-Generation Tag Team Championship on two occasions.

In November 2001, Rock and Grunge (as the "South Philly Posse") took part in television tapings for the X Wrestling Federation in Orlando, Florida.

In May 2002, Rock and Grunge began appearing with the Philadelphia-based Pro-Pain Pro-Wrestling promotion.

== Death ==
Petty died of a heart attack on September 21, 2002, while en route to a Pro-Pain Pro Wrestling show where he was scheduled to wrestle against Gary Wolfe in a match for the promotion's heavyweight title. His family stated that Petty never used drugs but that his death was caused by a congenital heart defect that runs in his family.

Every year, the IWA-Mid South professional wrestling promotion memorializes him by holding the Ted Petty Invitational tournament. Previous winners include AJ Styles, Matt Sydal, Low Ki, and Mike Quackenbush.

== Championships and accomplishments ==
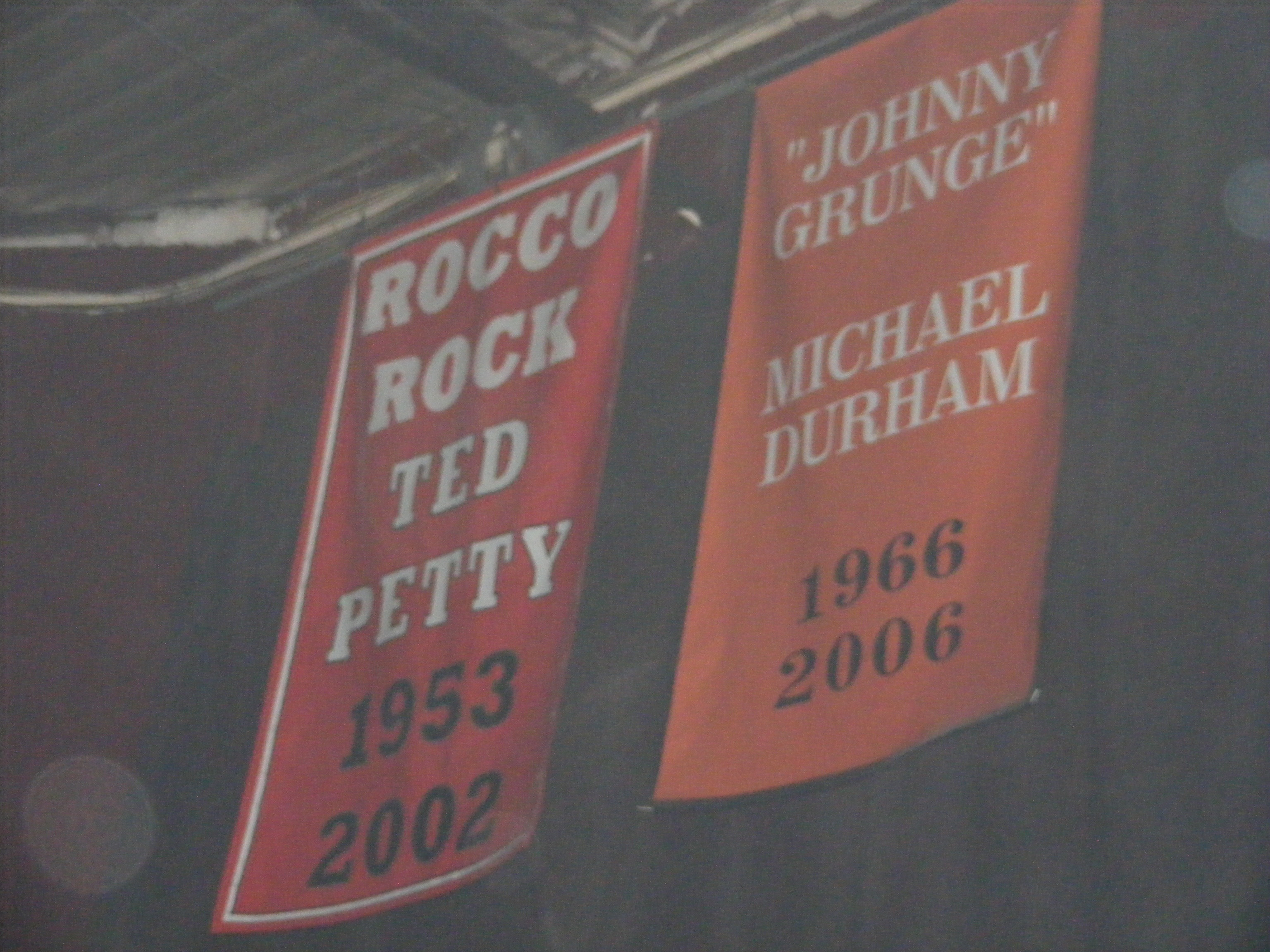
Rocco Rock's Hardcore Hall of Fame banner in the former ECW Arena.

- Cauliflower Alley Club
  - Other honoree (1995)
- Eastern Championship Wrestling / Extreme Championship Wrestling
  - ECW (World) Tag Team Championship (4 times) – with Johnny Grunge
- Hardcore Hall of Fame
  - Class of 2002
- i-Generation Superstars of Wrestling
  - i-Generation Tag Team Championship (2 times) – with Johnny Grunge
- Independent Wrestling Association Mid-South
  - IWA Mid-South Heavyweight Championship (1 time)
- Main Event Championship Wrestling
  - MECW Tag Team Championship (1 time) – with Johnny Grunge
- National Wrestling Alliance
  - NWA World Tag Team Championship (1 time) – with Johnny Grunge
- NWA New Jersey
  - NWA United States Tag Team Championship (1 time) – with Johnny Grunge
- New England Pro Wrestling Hall of Fame
  - Class of 2010
- New-Wave Championship Wrestling
  - NWCW Tag Team Championship (1 time) – with Johnny Grunge
- Pro Wrestling Illustrated
  - Ranked No. 457 of the 500 best singles wrestlers of the PWI Years in 2003
- Superstars of Wrestling
  - SOW Tag Team Championship (2 times) – with Johnny Grunge
- Turnbuckle Championship Wrestling
  - TCW Tag Team Championship (1 time) – with Johnny Grunge
- Tri-State Wrestling Alliance
  - TWA Brass Knuckles Championship (1 time)
- Universal Wrestling Alliance
  - UWA Heavyweight Championship (2 times)
  - UWA Tag Team Championship (1 time) – with Johnny Grunge
- Universal Wrestling Association
  - UWA Light Heavyweight Championship (1 time)
- World Championship Wrestling
  - WCW World Tag Team Championship (1 time) – with Johnny Grunge
- Other promotions
  - IPW Tag Team Championship (1 time) – with Johnny Grunge
  - MCW Tag Team Championship (1 time) – with Johnny Grunge
  - WCCA Junior Heavyweight Championship (1 time)
  - WWWC Junior Heavyweight Championship (1 time)

== See also ==
- List of premature professional wrestling deaths
