= Crossing the Line '99 =

1999 Extreme Championship Wrestling live event

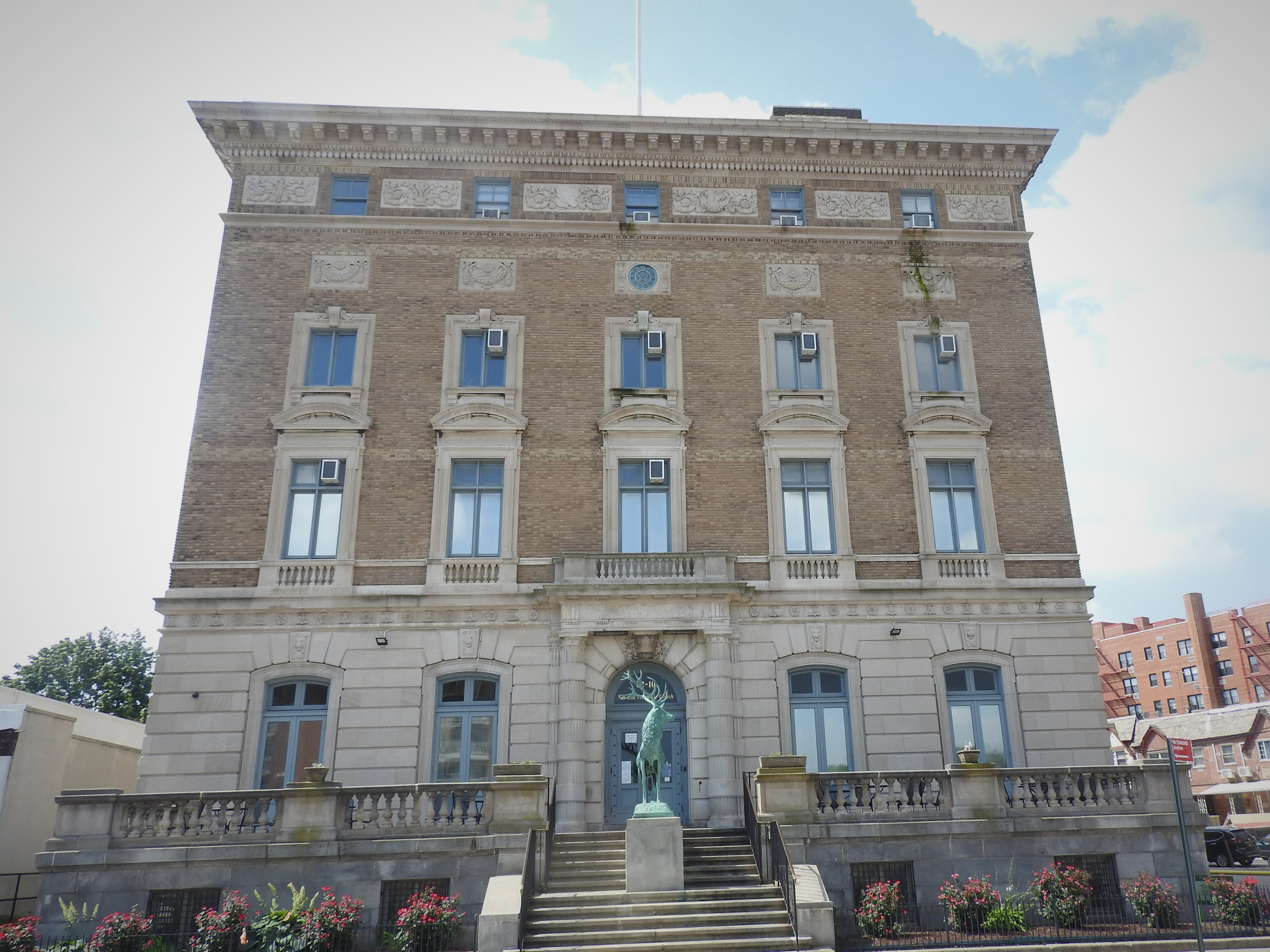
- Elks Lodge #878 in Queens
- Promotion: Extreme Championship Wrestling
- Date: February 12, 1999 (aired 20 and 27 February 1999)
- City: New York City, New York, US
- Venue: Elks Lodge #878
- Attendance: c. 1.000

Event chronology
← Previous; House Party	Next → CyberSlam

Crossing the Line '99 was a professional wrestling live event produced by Extreme Championship Wrestling (ECW) on February 12, 1999. The event was held in Elks Lodge #878 in the Queens neighborhood of New York City, New York in the United States. Excerpts from Crossing the Line '99 aired on episodes #304 and #305 of the syndicated television program ECW Hardcore TV on 20 and 27 February 1999, while the full event was released on VHS in 1999 and on DVD in 2002. The main event bout between Jerry Lynn and Rob Van Dam was included on the 2015 compilation DVD ECW Unreleased Vol. 3.

== Event ==
The event was attended by approximately 1,000 people. The announcer for the event was Joey Styles.

The opening bout was a singles match between Chris Chetti against Little Guido. Chris Chetti defeated Little Guido by pinfall following a double springboard moonsault.

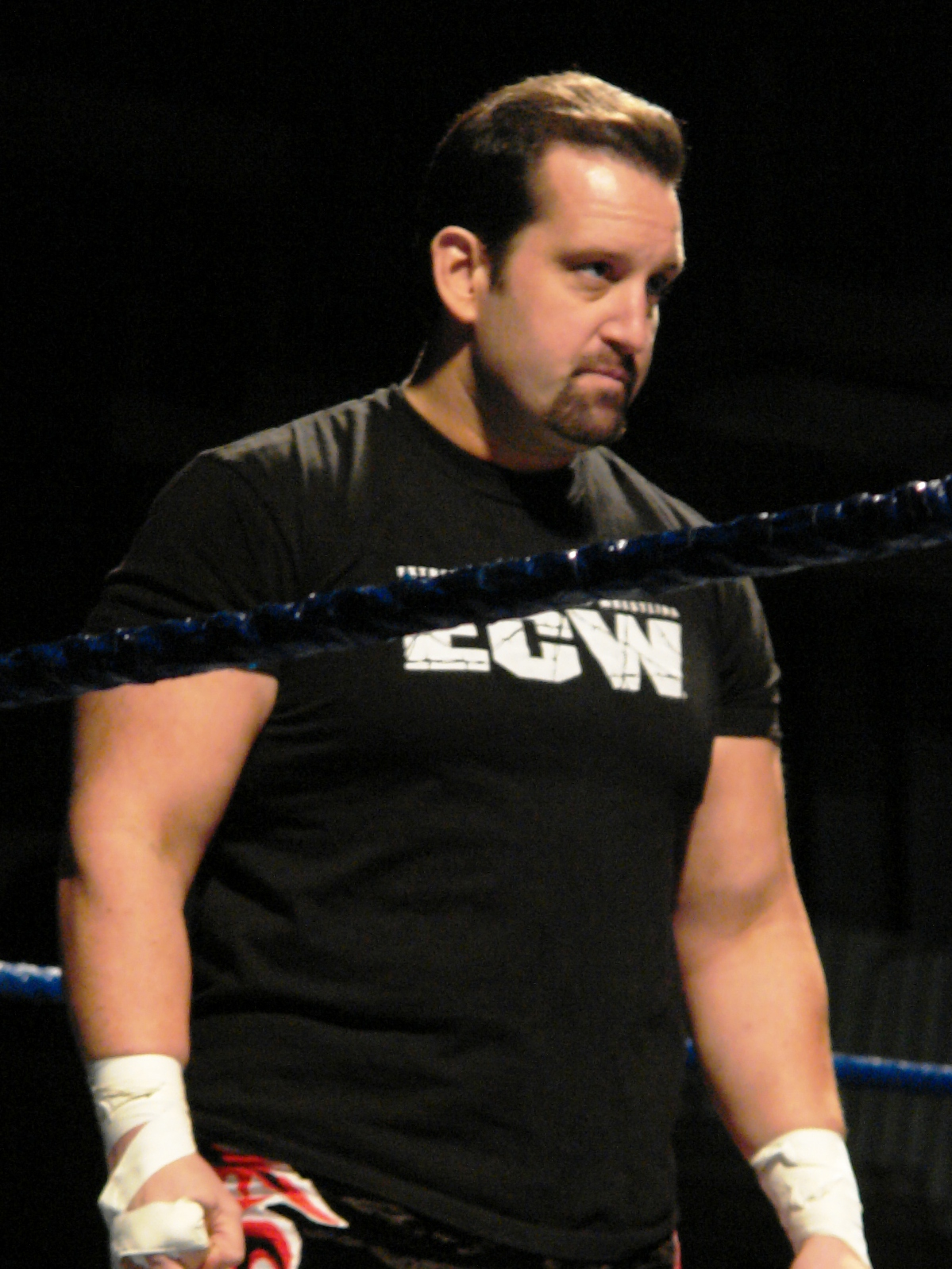
ECW mainstay Tommy Dreamer was named the new "franchise" of the company at Crossing the Line '99.

The second bout was a tag team match in which the Hardcore Chair Swingin' Freaks defeated Danny Doring and Roadkill, pinning Roadkill following simultaneous chair shots.

Following the second bout, announcer Joey Styles conducted a brief interview with ECW World Heavyweight Champion Taz in which he said he would "choke out" anyone who challenged him at the upcoming pay-per-view Living Dangerously.

Shane Douglas then came to the ring with his valet Francine and gave an interview in which he announced he was retiring due to injuries and would name the new "franchise" of ECW. This prompted Justin Credible and Lance Storm to come to the ring, with both men claiming the title for themselves. Douglas, however, went on to name ECW mainstay Tommy Dreamer as the new franchise. An angered Credible hit Francine and Douglas with his Singapore cane; after Dreamer came to the ring to intervene, he was caned by Storm. This marked the beginning of Credible and Storm's alliance as the Impact Players.

The third bout was a singles match between Super Crazy and Yoshihiro Tajiri. Super Crazy won the bout by pinfall using a springboard 450° splash.

The fourth bout was a singles match in which Sabu defended the FTW Heavyweight Championship (an "unsanctioned" championship) against Skull Von Crush. The match ended in a no contest after Sabu drove Von Crush through a table at ringside using a diving splash. Following the match, Sabu challenged his long-time rival Taz who came to the ring and brawled with him until they were separated.

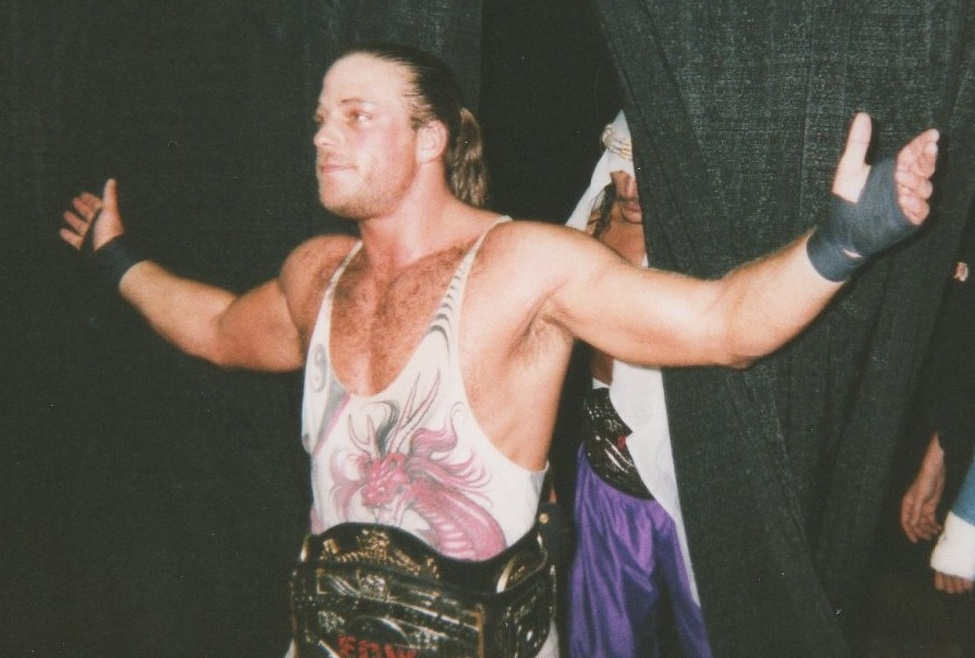
ECW World Television Champion Rob Van Dam successfully defended his title in the main event of Crossing the Line '99.

Following the fourth bout, the Dudley Brothers came to the ring, with Buh Buh Ray Dudley giving a promo in which he boasted about driving the Public Enemy out of ECW. New Jack then came to the ring and confronted the Dudleys before being unexpectedly joined by his former tag team partner, Mustafa. Mustafa and New Jack then brawled with the Dudleys until Mustafa turned on New Jack, revealing himself to be allied with the Dudleys. The Dudleys and Mustafa (who renamed himself "Mr. Mustafa") then attacked New Jack, with John Kronus and Spike Dudley unsuccessfully trying to help him.

Lance Storm then gave a promo in which he introduced "Beulah McGillicutty" as his new manager, only for "McGillicutty" to be revealed as the returning Dawn Marie. After Tommy Dreamer - the partner of the real Beulah McGillicutty - attacked Storm, Storm, Justin Credible and Jason beat down Dreamer until being driven off by Shane Douglas and Francine. Douglas, Dreamer, and Francine then gave the Triple Threat sign together, making the start of their alliance.

The penultimate bout was a singles match between John Kronus and Steve Corino. The match ended in a no contest when Sid came to the ring and beat down both men after Corino "stole" his signature move, the powerbomb.

The main event saw ECW World Television Champion Rob Van Dam defend his title against Jerry Lynn. Van Dam defeated Lynn by pinfall following a "Five Star Frog Splash" to retain his title.

== Results ==
No.	Results	Stipulations	Times
1	Chris Chetti defeated Little Guido (with Sal E. Graziano) by pinfall	Singles match	—
2	The Hardcore Chair Swingin' Freaks (Axl Rotten and Balls Mahoney) defeated Danny Doring and Roadkill by pinfall	Tag team match	—
3	Super Crazy defeated Yoshihiro Tajiri by pinfall	Singles match	7:15
4	Sabu (with Bill Alfonso) vs. Skull Von Crush ended in a no contest	Singles match for the FTW Heavyweight Championship	6:00
5	John Kronus vs. Steve Corino ended in a no contest	Singles match	—
6	Rob Van Dam (c) (with Bill Alfonso) defeated Jerry Lynn by pinfall	Singles match for the ECW World Television Championship	—
(c) / – the champion(s) heading into the match
