= Hardcore Homecoming =

Series of professional wrestling events

- Hardcore Homecoming logo from 2005
- Founded: 2005
- Style: Hardcore wrestling
- Headquarters: Philadelphia, Pennsylvania
- Founder(s): Shane Douglas, Jeremy Borash
- Predecessor: Extreme Championship Wrestling

Hardcore Homecoming was a series of professional wrestling events which were advertised as a reunion of talent from the defunct Extreme Championship Wrestling promotion. The tour was booked and promoted by Cody Michaels, Shane Douglas (a former ECW World Heavyweight Champion) and Jeremy Borash in 2005. The event footage was released on DVD with a companion documentary of ECW's history called Forever Hardcore.

== History ==
The inaugural Hardcore Homecoming event was held from 8:00 pm to 11:55 pm on June 10, 2005, at the Alhambra Arena, formerly known unofficially as the ECW Arena, in South Philadelphia; this was two days before the WWE produced/promoted ECW One Night Stand 2005 reunion show in New York City. The show was preceded by a fan tailgate party in front of the former ECW Arena, with several wrestlers in attendance. This was reminiscent of territorial wrestling in the 1980s, when many independent promotions would hold barbecues before and after the event.

No former ECW performers under contract to WWE appeared at the event (nor would they appear at any of the other three Hardcore Homecoming events which soon followed). However, Mick Foley, a retired worker who wasn't under contract to WWE at the time, made an unannounced appearance. Former ECW ring announcers Bob Artese (referred to in the DVD's on-screen graphics as "Bob Ortiz") and Stephen DeAngelis worked the event, as did former ECW referees John Finnegan, Mike Kehner and John "Pee Wee" Moore and former ECW timekeeper Rocco Musciano.

Following the success of the inaugural event, Hardcore Homecoming launched an "Extreme Reunion Tour" in the month of September. Originally, the tour was to consist of three shows, but the September 17 show in Buffalo was canceled just days before the tour began; it is believed that the promoter was unaware that he needed a promoter's license to run a show in New York. However, the tour did continue with two shows, and it would return to Philadelphia on November 5 (billed as November Reign) for what Tod Gordon has said will stand as the final Hardcore Homecoming show. However, at an ECW reunion convention, Douglas announced that Hardcore Homecoming would return, first with a 'November to Remember' card in 2009 which would later be renamed Legends of the Arena and took place on June 27, 2009.

== Results ==
=== An Extreme Reunion ===
June 10, 2005, from the former ECW Arena in Philadelphia, Pennsylvania

- Tod Gordon and Hat Guy are introduced to the crowd
- Introduction: Joey Styles, Joel Gertner and Cyrus

==== Results ====
| No. | Results | Stipulations | Times |
|---|---|---|---|
| 1 | Mikey Whipwreck and Chris Chetti defeated Simon Diamond and C. W. Anderson | Tag team match | 07:53 |
| 2 | Tracy Smothers (with J.T. Smith) defeated The Blue Meanie | Singles match | 08:11 |
| 3 | 2 Cold Scorpio defeated Kid Kash | Singles match | 17:00 |
| 4 | The Gangstanators (New Jack and John Kronus) vs. The Bad Breed (Axl Rotten and Ian Rotten) ended in a no contest* | Tag team match | — |
| 5 | Jerry Lynn defeated Justin Credible (with Jason) | Singles match | 20:23 |
| 6 | Raven (with The Blue Meanie and The Musketeer) defeated The Sandman | Singles match | 09:56 |
| 7 | Sabu (with Bill Alfonso) defeated Shane Douglas (with Francine) and Terry Funk (with Tammy Lynn Sytch) | Barbed Wire Three-Way Dance with Mick Foley as special guest referee | 21:01 |

- Also: Tribute to the Fallen Heroes of Hardcore: Johnny Grunge (former tag team partner of Rocco Rock), Pitbull #1 (former tag team partner of Pitbull #2) and Tammy Lynn Sytch (widow of Chris Candido) deliver a eulogy. They are interrupted by Danny Doring and Roadkill, who are then chokeslammed by 911)
- Note: There was no referee. This match was originally supposed to be The Eliminators vs. The Bad Breed, but Perry Saturn was injured.

=== Extreme Reunion Tour - Night 1 ===
September 16, 2005, from the Agora Theatre in Cleveland, Ohio

==== Results ====
| No. | Results | Stipulations |
|---|---|---|
| 1 | The Blue Meanie defeated Tracy Smothers | Singles match |
| 2 | Danny Doring defeated Chris Chetti | Singles match |
| 3 | New Jack defeated Roadkill | Singles match |
| 4 | Raven defeated Rhino | Singles match |
| 5 | Shane Douglas defeated Jerry Lynn and Sabu | Three-Way Dance |
| 6 | Team 3D (Brother Ray and Brother Devon) defeated Balls Mahoney and Ian Rotten | Tables match |
| 7 | The Sandman defeated Justin Credible | Singapore Cane match |

=== Extreme Reunion Tour - Night 2 ===
September 17, 2005, from the Golden Dome in Monaca, Pennsylvania

==== Results ====
| No. | Results | Stipulations |
|---|---|---|
| 1 | Smasher LeBlanc defeated Jermaine Jubilee | Singles match |
| 2 | Tracy Smothers defeated The Blue Meanie | Singles match |
| 3 | Danny Doring and Roadkill defeated Chris Chetti and C. W. Anderson | Tag team match |
| 4 | New Jack defeated Balls Mahoney and Ian Rotten | Three-Way Dance |
| 5 | Jerry Lynn defeated Justin Credible | Singles match |
| 6 | Pitbull #1 defeated Shane Douglas | Dog Collar match |
| 7 | Sabu defeated The Sandman | Stairway to Hell match |

=== November Reign ===
November 5, 2005, from the former ECW Arena in Philadelphia, Pennsylvania

==== Results ====
| No. | Results | Stipulations | Times |
|---|---|---|---|
| 1 | The Blue Meanie defeated Danny Doring | Singles match | — |
| 2 | Balls Mahoney defeated John Kronus | Singles match | — |
| 3 | Matt Hyson defeated C. W. Anderson | Singles match | — |
| 4 | Axl Rotten defeated Ian Rotten | Taipei Death match | 10:12 |
| 5 | Pitbull #1 defeated Shane Douglas | Dog Collar match | 09:07 |
| 6 | Team 3D (Brother Ray and Brother Devon) defeated Sabu and Terry Funk* | Tag Team match | — |
| 7 | Justin Credible (with Dawn Marie) defeated Jerry Lynn | Steel Cage match | 15:47 |

- Also: Tod Gordon inducted Terry Funk into the Hardcore Hall of Fame.
- This match was not featured on DVD due to copyright reasons and the Dudleys joining TNA.

== Forever Hardcore documentary ==
Forever Hardcore was a professional wrestling documentary that interviewed wrestlers who participated in the June 10, 2005 Hardcore Homecoming show. It was produced by Big Vision Entertainment and former TNA booker Jeremy Borash, and was released on June 10, 2005, to coincide with the show. The documentary was designed to be a counterpoint to the WWE produced documentary The Rise and Fall of ECW.

The documentary featured interviews with ECW alumni such as Shane Douglas, Sandman, Raven and Jerry Lynn, wrestlers who contributed to the history of ECW but who were not featured on The Rise and Fall of ECW because they weren't under contract to WWE. It also featured ECW alumnus Sabu in what was at the time a rare speaking role as well as former WWF and WCW writer Vince Russo who gave an outside perspective. The documentary features New Jack admitting to attempting to kill Vic Grimes in the rematch to their notorious scaffold match.

The two-disc set also included bonus matches from former ECW wrestlers who competed in the now-defunct XPW. It was also released on April 30, 2007, for sale in Europe on region 2 DVD.

== Home video ==
Unlike One Night Stand 2005, the June 10, 2005 Hardcore Homecoming event was not broadcast on pay-per-view. A two-disc DVD set of the show was released in August 2005 through the promotion's website, and Big Vision Entertainment later released a "Platinum Edition" of the event commercially, coinciding with the commercial release of Forever Hardcore. The broadcast was released in Europe on Region 2 DVD on April 30, 2007. Joey Styles was present at the event and provided play-by-play for the DVD release.

The second (and final) Philadelphia show from November 2005 was released in early 2006, with a Platinum Edition of it released by Big Vision Entertainment in May 2006. Buck Woodward and Eric Gargiulo were both present at the November 5, 2005 event and provided play-by-play and color commentary for the show's webcast and DVD release. The Platinum Edition does not feature the Sabu/Funk vs. Team 3D match, as Team 3D's contract with Total Nonstop Action Wrestling prohibits them from appearing on non-TNA video releases. However, the Platinum Edition does feature many bonus matches from independent shows in the early 1990s, XPW and matches from the second show on Hardcore Homecoming's reunion tour. A bootleg edition of this event featuring the Sabu/Funk vs. Team 3D match can be purchased from RF Video and Highspots.com.

Footage of both shows from the Reunion tour were released later in 2005, as the entire Cleveland show was released through the promotion's website, as well as through former ECW videographer RF Video. Despite being advertised for future release, the Monaca show has yet to be released in its entirety. However, 4 of the 6 matches from the show were released as bonus features on the commercially released 'November Reign' DVD, with the Dog-Collar and Stairway to Hell matches being omitted from inclusion.

== See also ==
- List of independent wrestling promotions in the United States
