= The Public Enemy (professional wrestling) =

Professional disbanded wrestling tag team

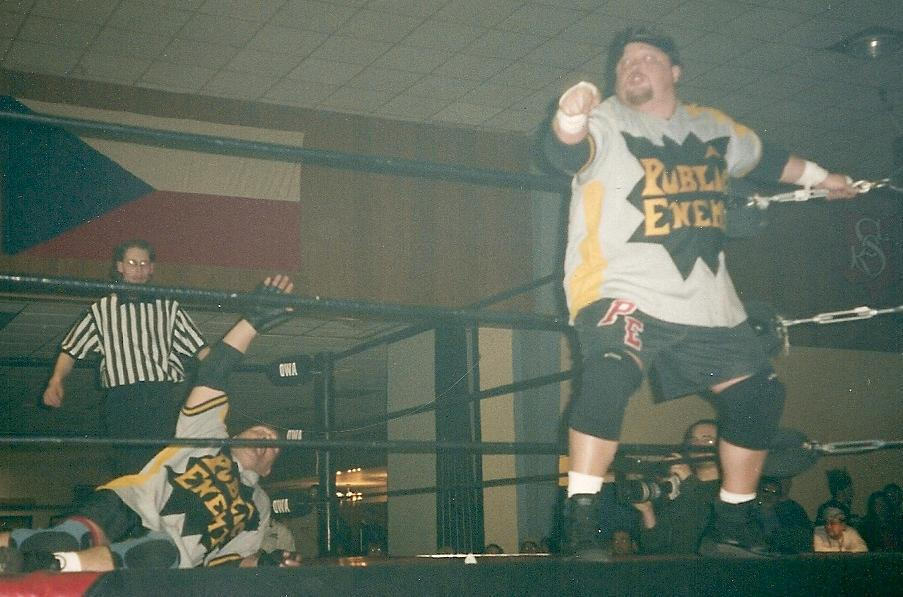
- The Public Enemy, Rocco Rock (left) & Johnny Grunge (right)

Tag team
- Members: Johnny Grunge; Rocco Rock
- Name(s): The Public Enemy; The South Philly Posse
- Billed heights: 6 ft 3 in (1.91 m) – Grunge; 6 ft 2 in (1.88 m) – Rock
- Combined billed weight: 514 lb (233 kg)
- Hometown: South Philadelphia
- Debut: 1993
- Disbanded: 2002
- Years active: 1993–2002

The Public Enemy was a professional wrestling tag team consisting of Rocco Rock and Johnny Grunge. The duo competed in many promotions, including Extreme Championship Wrestling (ECW), World Championship Wrestling (WCW), National Wrestling Alliance (NWA), and the World Wrestling Federation (WWF). They won the World Tag Team Championships in each company except WWF.

Their name was taken from a black and white gangster film, and prior to becoming a team, Rocco Rock and Johnny Grunge had a long-standing feud on the independent circuit. In addition, the two wrestled each other under their former ring names the Cheetah Kid and Johnny Rotten in a dark match at the first TV tapings for WWF Monday Night Raw on January 11, 1993, eight months before they would debut as a tag team in ECW.

In September 2002, Rocco Rock died after a heart attack. Johnny Grunge died in February 2006 from sleep apnea complications.

== History ==
=== Eastern / Extreme Championship Wrestling (1993–1996) ===
The Public Enemy made their ECW debut in September 1993 at UltraClash, as booker Paul Heyman gave them the gimmick of white guys who embraced and loved the growing hip hop culture of America. Heyman has stated that he got the inspiration to create The Public Enemy from a Newsweek article about the cultural changes occurring in America and the difficulty for young men living in places like Los Angeles during the early 1990s, with a quote that stated "The generation of today is more afraid of living than dying".

The team quickly became one of the more popular acts in the company; their wild brawling style, complete with a myriad of foreign objects and the inclusion of tables, made them one of the most feared teams in the company and it wasn't long before they won their first ECW Tag Team Championship. They regularly danced their way to the ring, waving their arms to their theme song (Ini Kamoze's "Here Comes The Hotstepper") and inviting fans into the ring for impromptu dance parties after winning matches. As The Public Enemy was embraced by the majority of fans, Heyman was inspired to bring in The Gangstas (New Jack and Mustafa Saed, from Smoky Mountain Wrestling) at Barbed Wire, Hoodies & Chokeslams to feud with TPE. The Gangstas immediately began a long and bloody feud with The Public Enemy, which pitted The Gangstas' "harsh, gritty West Coast gangsta" lifestyle against The Public Enemy's "East Coast feel good" style. Their feud is among the feuds most often cited as "classic ECW".

==== Memorable moments ====
The Public Enemy was also involved in some of ECW's most memorable moments. On one occasion, during a singles match between Cactus Jack and Terry Funk at Hardcore Heaven 1994, the Public Enemy interfered and attacked both wrestlers. Terry Funk turned to the crowd and asked the fans if he could have a chair to use. A fan immediately threw a chair into the ring, and not long after many other fans followed suit. Eventually the ring was filled with chairs with both members of The Public Enemy buried underneath.

In another incident in Tampa, Florida, towards the end of their run with ECW, during the Sunshine State Slaughter event in 1995, The Public Enemy asked the fans to come into the ring to dance with them one last time. As more and more fans piled in and onto the ring, all dancing and celebrating, the ring collapsed.

=== World Championship Wrestling (1996–1998) ===
On November 19, 1995, The Public Enemy received a tryout with the WWF, wrestling a dark match against then WWF Tag-Team Champions The Smoking Gunns. The team would receive an offer to sign with the company, but instead elected to go with a competing overture from World Championship Wrestling. In January 1996, after their success in ECW, The Public Enemy signed on to work for World Championship Wrestling (WCW). When they arrived in WCW, they continued acting as they did in the manner that made them so popular with fans. Although the majority of the WCW fanbase was unfamiliar with the ECW product at the time, they still carried tables to the ring. During their three-year stint, they won their only WCW World Tag Team Championship with a victory over Harlem Heat in September 1996, though their reign lasted only eight days. The team wrestled through September 1998 and was mostly victorious in their final year with the company, concluding their run with a win over Villanos IV and V on a Worldwide episode.

=== Return to ECW, World Wrestling Federation, and return to WCW (1999) ===
At ECW's House Party 1999 on January 16, The Public Enemy made a long-awaited and much-hyped return to the ECW Arena, in order to answer the challenge of the Dudley Boyz. At the time, they were still under contract to WCW, but they successfully brawled (with assistance from New Jack) with the Dudleys. Following the showdown, Johnny Grunge grabbed the microphone and claimed that the past three years had been a "rollercoaster ride" for the team, and that "if you opened up our chest and looked at our hearts, there's only one thing stamped on it, and that's ECW!" Grunge further thanked the Dudleys for house-sitting "the house that the Public Enemy built" while they were gone, and then invited everyone in attendance to join them in the ring for a post-show celebration.

Their next scheduled appearance was at Crossing the Line '99 on February 12 in Queens, New York against the Dudleys, which they cancelled due to negotiating with the WWF. The team was buried on the February 20 edition of ECW Hardcore TV as being cowards who ran from a fight. Footage of the Dudleys hitting big moves on the team at an event in Detroit was shown, with a headline stating "Breaking News: The Dudleys Destroy Public Enemy." Two days later, the team would make their WWF debut.

The Public Enemy signed with the World Wrestling Federation in early 1999. They were not accepted "backstage" by veteran WWF wrestlers and backstage personnel due to animosity over the fact that The Public Enemy chose WCW over the WWF when the two companies were pursuing the tag team in late 1995. Rocco Rock was also forced to change his name and go by the shortened name "Flyboy" Rocco, in order not to "cause confusion" with The Rock. They made their WWF debut on the February 22, 1999, episode of Raw is War, defeating The Brood by disqualification. In the two months they lasted in the WWF, their most notable appearance was losing a squash match against the Acolytes on Sunday Night Heat in Pittsburgh; following a brief feud with the Acolytes and The Public Enemy's subsequent release, the Acolytes claimed that they "ran The Public Enemy out" of the WWF. They said they could do the same to another famous ECW tag team (the Dudley Boyz); after the Dudley Boyz succeeded in the feud, it was commonly referred to as "Passing the Acolyte Test" since the Dudley Boyz did get over after a feud with the APA while The Public Enemy failed. In 2013, John "Bradshaw" Layfield elaborated that much of the animosity was due to them being brought into the company by Terry Taylor, who had his own backstage issues with many of the wrestlers, including the Acolytes. They had also desired to change the planned finish of the squash match, which involved them being driven through tables by the Acolytes. The Acolytes were instructed only to ensure that they go through with the planned finish of the match, leading to the match to be turned into a legitimate shoot, with The Acolytes dominating Public Enemy for the entirety of the four-minute match. Public Enemy would wrestle a final time on March 30, 1999, in a match taped for Shotgun Saturday Night, losing to the Hardy Boys via disqualification. The match was aired on television on April 10, 1999. Shortly after airing, both members of Public Enemy were released in mid-April, along with "Dr Death." Steve Williams (who main-evented that same episode), Bart Gunn, and LOD 2000.

The Public Enemy briefly returned to WCW after leaving the WWF, with both men involved in the WCW Hardcore Junkyard Invitational. They then made an appearance on the August 4, 1999, episode of WCW Thunder in a squash match loss against Bill Goldberg and again on August 9 in a losing effort against the West Texas Rednecks. Their final appearance came in a house show on August 18, and neither made an appearance in WCW again afterwards.

=== Later years (1999–2002) ===
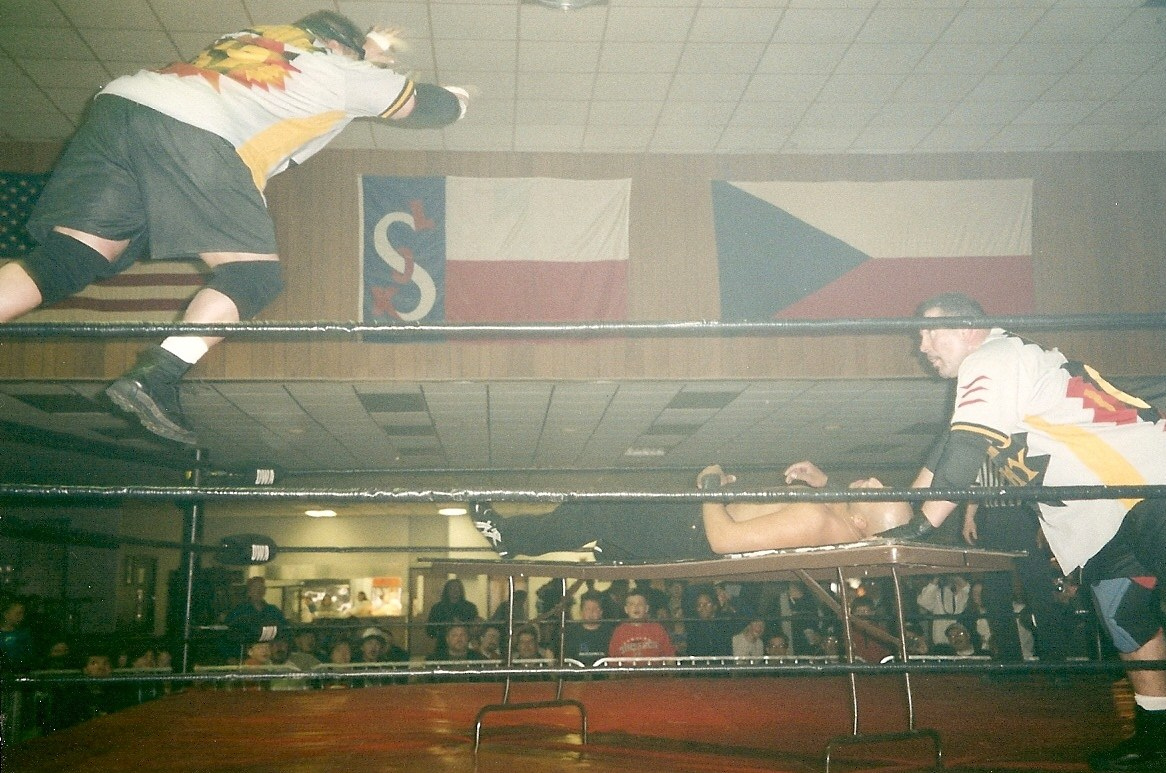
The Public Enemy performing a double team maneuver

The Public Enemy made one last appearance on ECW on TNN, which was their last exposure on mainstream television. The tag team made brief appearances on the independent scene after both WCW and ECW folded, appearing in ECW-nostalgia promotion Pro-Pain Pro Wrestling (3PW), along with various NWA territories. They also participated in the unaired tapings for the X Wrestling Federation promotion, under the name "South Philly Posse" and managed by Jasmin St. Claire.

In the early 2000s, the Public Enemy performed for the short-lived i-Generation Superstars of Wrestling among other independent promotions. The team won various independent tag team titles.

Their last match together was at Intergalactic Wrestling Federation defeating Itch Coma Weidler and The Bouncer in a steel cage match at the Illinois State Fair in Springfield, IL on August 12, 2002.

Following the death of Rocco Rock in 2002, Grunge teamed with his "brother" Joey Grunge as The New Public Enemy throughout August 2003. He also made appearances with 3PW, and participated in a memorial segment for deceased ECW wrestlers at Hardcore Homecoming on June 10, 2005.

== Deaths ==
On September 21, 2002, Ted Petty ("Flyboy" Rocco Rock) died after suffering a heart attack following a wrestling event. Johnny Grunge had been semi-retired for a few years after the XWF failed to get a TV deal. On February 16, 2006, Mike Durham (Johnny Grunge) died in his home after suffering from complications from sleep apnea. Durham's death was caused by heart disease and obesity, with the medical examiner also citing "acute toxicity of carisoprodol and hydrocodone" in the autopsy report. Durham evidently died in his sleep at the home of a friend with whom he'd been staying.

Durham's widow has since become an advocate against drug abuse in the wrestling industry since the Chris Benoit double murder and suicide in 2007, when she realized her husband's prescriptions came from the same doctor as Chris Benoit's.

== Championships and accomplishments ==
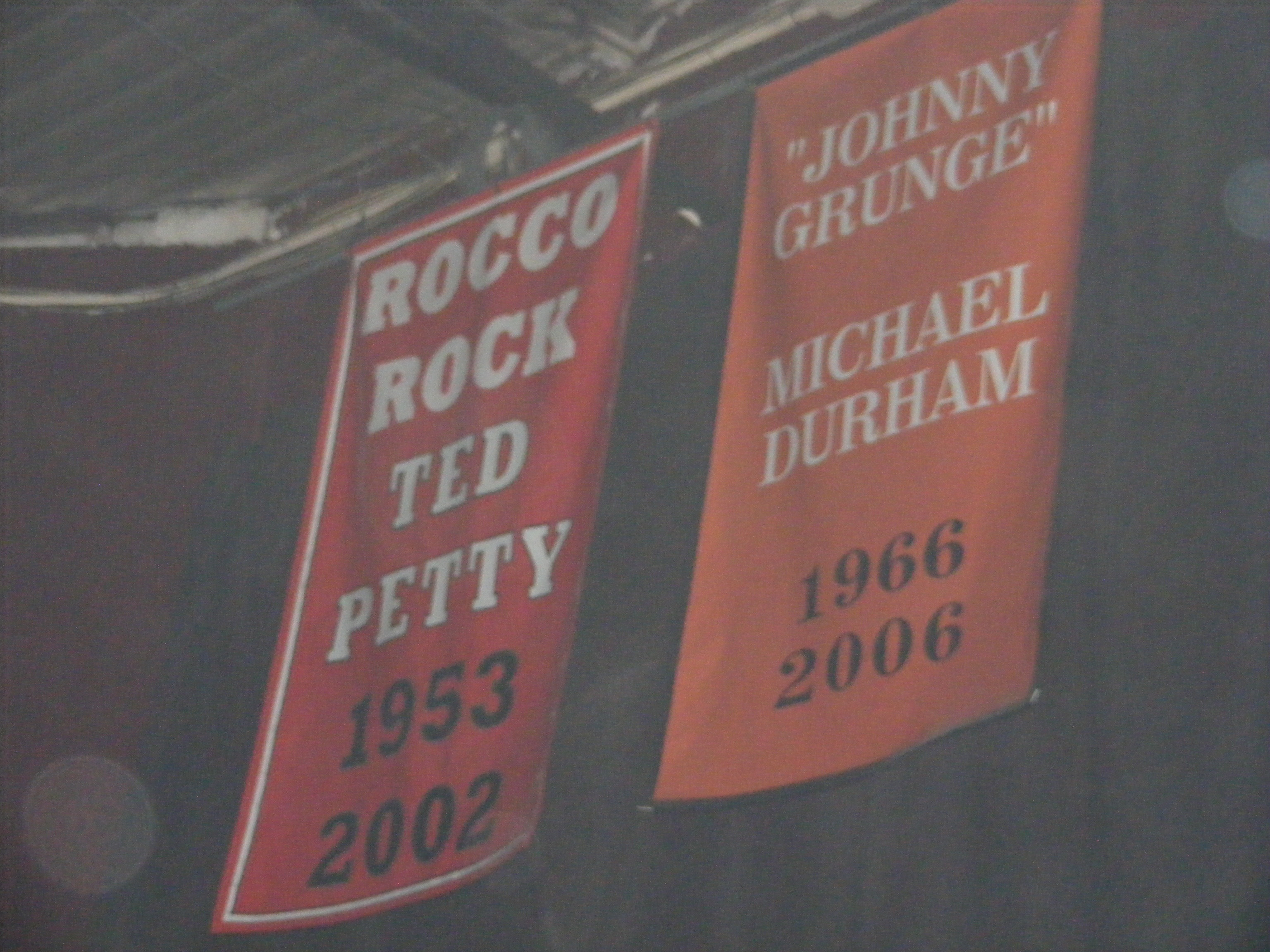
Public Enemy's Hardcore Hall of Fame banners

- Cauliflower Alley Club
  - Other honorees (1995)
- Eastern Championship Wrestling / Extreme Championship Wrestling
  - ECW World Tag Team Championship (4 times)
  - Hardcore Hall of Fame (2002) - Rock
  - Hardcore Hall of Fame (2007) - Grunge
- i-Generation Superstars of Wrestling
  - i-Generation Tag Team Championship (2 times)
- Main Event Championship Wrestling
  - MECW Tag Team Championship (1 time)
- National Wrestling Alliance
  - NWA World Tag Team Championship (1 time)
- NWA New Jersey
  - NWA United States Tag Team Championship (1 time)
- New England Pro Wrestling Hall of Fame
  - Class of 2010
- New-Wave Championship Wrestling
  - NWCW Tag Team Championship (1 time)
- Turnbuckle Championship Wrestling
  - TCW Tag Team Championship (1 time)
- Universal Wrestling Alliance
  - UWA Tag Team Championship (1 time)
- World Championship Wrestling
  - WCW World Tag Team Championship (1 time)
- Other titles
  - IPW Tag Team Championship (1 time)
  - MCW Tag Team Championship (1 time)

== See also ==
- List of premature professional wrestling deaths
