= New Jack =

American professional wrestler (1963–2021)

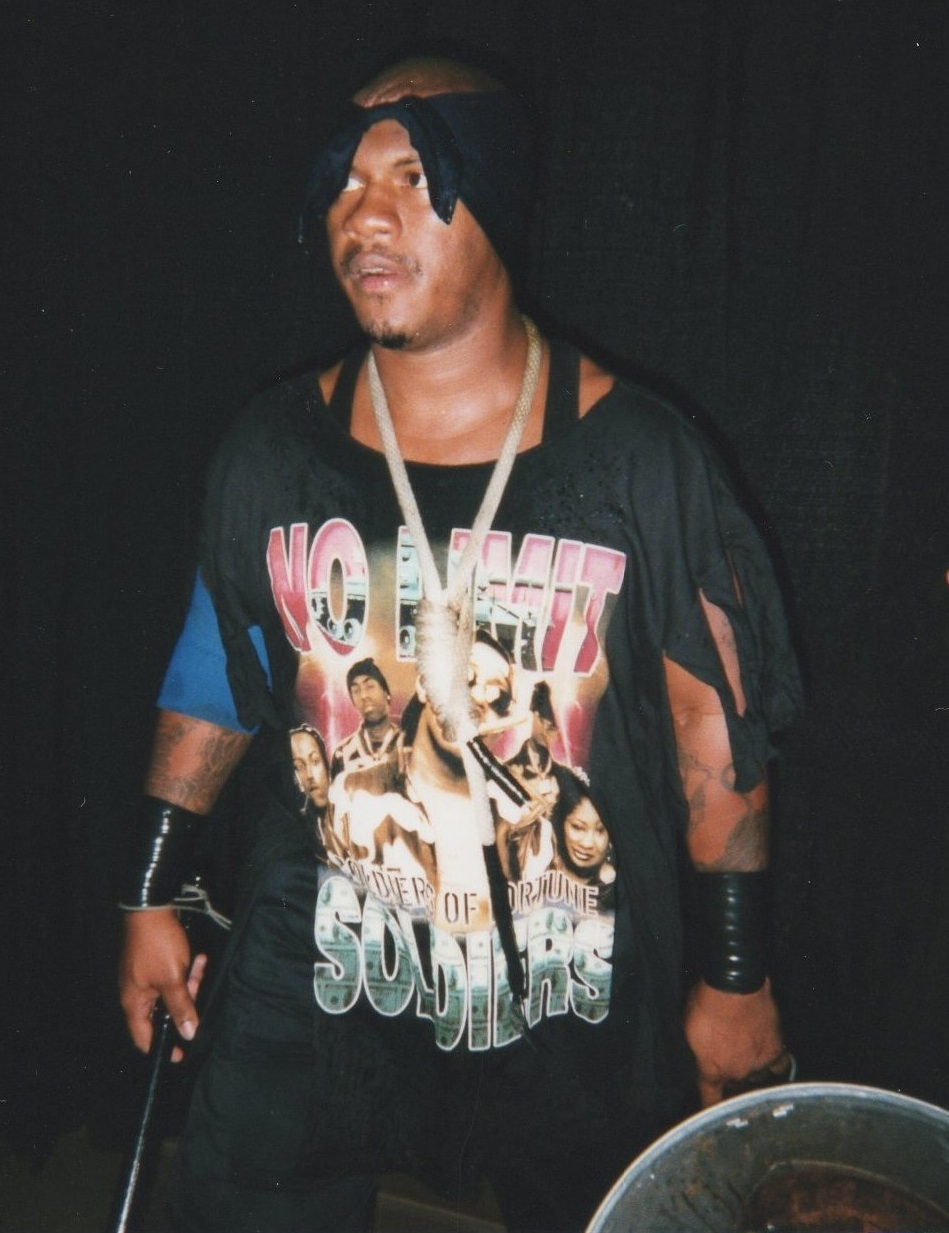
- New Jack in 1998

Personal information
- Born: Jerome Young; January 3, 1963 Greensboro, North Carolina, U.S.
- Died: May 14, 2021 (aged 58) Greensboro, North Carolina, U.S.
- Cause of death: Cocaine/Fentanyl toxicity
- Spouse: Jennifer Young (m. 2017)
- Children: 6
- Website: theonlynewjack.com

Professional wrestling career
- Ring name: New Jack
- Billed height: 6 ft 0 in (183 cm)
- Billed weight: 240 lb (109 kg)
- Billed from: South Central, Los Angeles
- Trained by: Ray Candy
- Debut: 1992

Jerome Young (January 3, 1963 – May 14, 2021) was an American professional wrestler better known by his ring name New Jack. He was best known for his time with Extreme Championship Wrestling (ECW), where he became notorious for his willingness to take dangerous bumps and for his stiff hardcore wrestling style, often taking high risks and known for shooting on opponents, for example his altercation with Gypsy Joe in 2003. In 1996, he was a key figure in the Mass Transit incident. He is also known for being the only wrestler to have had his entrance music ("Natural Born Killaz" by Ice Cube and Dr. Dre) play throughout his matches in ECW. After the promotion closed in 2001, Young spent the rest of his career on the independent circuit until his death in May 2021.

== Early life ==
Jerome Young was born on January 3, 1963, in Greensboro, North Carolina. In 1968, when he was five years old, he and his siblings witnessed his father stab his mother multiple times after he found out she had been cheating on him with other men. Five months later, he shot her in the leg when she tried to leave and take Young with her. His father died of a heart attack later in the year. He and his mother moved frequently across Georgia, usually trying to stay a step or two ahead of landlords seeking to evict them.

He attended various schools, before finally graduating from Atlanta's D.M. Therrell High School in 1981. There, Young had a measure of success in football, which led to him attending Clark Atlanta University. Around the age of fifteen, Young and his friends began robbing local stores, such as gas stations, sporting goods stores, and jewelry stores. They were eventually caught, and Young spent two years in prison for aggravated robbery. After his release, he worked briefly as a truck driver before spending the next decade as a bounty hunter. He got into wrestling through a friend of his named Melvin who was training to be a wrestler but ended up quitting.

== Professional wrestling career ==
=== United States Wrestling Association (1992–1993) ===
Young trained under Ray Candy and debuted in 1992 in the Memphis, Tennessee-based United States Wrestling Association (USWA), where he adopted the ring name "New Jack", inspired by the 1991 film New Jack City. In June 1993, he won his first championship, the USWA World Tag Team Championship with his partner Homeboy, defeating Simply Devine and holding the title for two weeks before losing it to C. W. Bergstrom and Melvin Penrod Jr. He remained with the company until the end of the summer.

=== North Georgia Wrestling Alliance (1993–1994) ===
After leaving Memphis, New Jack moved to Atlanta and wrestled for North Georgia Wrestling Alliance, and won their Heavyweight Championship. In early 1994 he paired up with former WCW enhancement talent Mustafa Saed and formed The Gangstas, winning the NGWA Tag Team Championship in July 1994, but quickly vacated them, as they left the territory.

=== Smoky Mountain Wrestling (1994–1995) ===
New Jack earned his name working for Jim Cornette in Smoky Mountain Wrestling. He formed a wrestling crew called the Gangstas. He toured the south and was normally squared off against Southern babyface tag team the Rock 'n' Roll Express. New Jack's partner was Mustafa Saed.

=== Extreme Championship Wrestling (1995–2001) ===
==== The Gangstas (1995–1997) ====
In June 1995, The Gangstas joined the Philadelphia-based Extreme Championship Wrestling (ECW) promotion, debuting for the promotion as a villainous team by attacking The Public Enemy (Rocco Rock and Johnny Grunge) at Barbed Wire, Hoodies and Chokeslams on June 17, 1995. Gangstas made their ECW in-ring debut at Hardcore Heaven by competing against Public Enemy in a losing effort. The two teams engaged in a lengthy rivalry and traded wins against each other throughout the year, with the feud ending in a street fight at House Party, which Public Enemy won. Public Enemy departed ECW after the event, thus ending the rivalry. At CyberSlam Gangstas were scheduled to compete in a match against The Headhunters but Jack was imprisoned in Atlanta and Mustafa was attacked by The Headhunters. Jack returned to ECW on March 8 at Big Ass Extreme Bash to rescue Mustafa from an assault by The Headhunters, resulting in The Gangstas turning into fan favorites.

The Gangstas began pursuing the ECW World Tag Team Championship and entered into a rivalry with the tag team champions The Eliminators (John Kronus and Perry Saturn) and received several title shots against Eliminators but came up short. At Fight the Power, Samoan Gangstas Party (L.A. Smooth and Sammy the Silk) made their ECW debut by attacking Gangstas. Samoan Gangsta Party cost Gangstas, another title shot against Eliminators at Hardcore Heaven. Gangstas then faced Samoan Gangstas Party in a match at Heat Wave which ended in a brawl between both teams. Gangstas' feud with Eliminators, Samoan Gangsta Party and The Bruise Brothers led to a four-way dance between the four teams at The Doctor Is In, which Gangstas won to capture their first World Tag Team Championship. Gangstas successfully defended the title against teams such as Samoan Gangsta Party, The Eliminators and Rob Van Dam and Sabu throughout the year.

New Jack was involved in the Mass Transit Incident on November 23, 1996, in Revere, Massachusetts. The Gangstas were scheduled to face D-Von Dudley and Axl Rotten. Rotten missed the show and was replaced with "Mass Transit" Erich Kulas, an untrained seventeen-year-old who convinced booker Paul Heyman that he was twenty-one and had been trained by the veteran Killer Kowalski. Kulas requested that New Jack "blade" him during the match, but the incision was made incorrectly, causing excessive bleeding. Kulas was hospitalized as a result, eventually receiving fifty stitches. New Jack was charged with aggravated assault stemming from the incident, but was acquitted, because Kulas had asked New Jack to cut him. Kulas subsequently sued New Jack and ECW for damages in July 1998, but lost the case. Kulas died on May 12, 2002, at the age of 22 due to complications from gastric bypass surgery.

Gangstas lost the World Tag Team Championship back to Eliminators on the January 4, 1997, episode of Hardcore TV, ending their reign at 139 days. Gangstas feuded with Eliminators and The Dudley Boyz over the title for the next several months. At Heat Wave, Gangstas defeated Dudley Boyz in a steel cage match to capture their second World Tag Team Championship. Mustafa Saed left ECW after the title win, leading to the dissolution of Gangstas. The following month, at Hardcore Heaven, Dudley Boyz were returned the championship, forfeited by Saed's departure.

==== The Gangstanators (1997–1998) ====
The departure of Mustafa Saed and Perry Saturn from ECW led New Jack to form a new tag team with former Eliminator John Kronus called The Gangstanators on August 21, 1997, by defeating The Dudley Boyz. The team debuted on television on the September 20 episode of Hardcore TV when Kronus earned a title shot at the ECW World Tag Team Championship by defeating the Dudleys and then Jack showed up as his tag team partner. They received their title shot at As Good as It Gets, where Gangstanators defeated Dudley Boyz to win the World Tag Team Championship, marking Jack's third tag title reign. They lost the belts to The Full Blooded Italians (Little Guido and Tracy Smothers) on the November 1 episode of Hardcore TV. They defeated Hardcore Chair Swingin' Freaks (Axl Rotten and Balls Mahoney) and Dudley Boyz in a three-way dance at Fright Fight and received a rematch for the title against FBI, the Freaks and Dudleys in a four-way dance at November to Remember, but lost.

Gangstanators resumed their feud with Dudley Boyz as the two teams competed in a match at the 1998 House Party, which Dudleys won. Gangstanators formed an alliance with Spike Dudley, the estranged brother of the Dudleys. At the Living Dangerously pay-per-view, New Jack and Spike Dudley defeated Hardcore Chair Swingin' Freaks and Dudley Boyz in a three-way dance. Jack then lost to Bam Bam Bigelow at Wrestlepalooza. Jack began emerging as a singles competitor while feuding with Dudley Boyz. This led to Jack and Kronus quietly dissolving Gangstanators and going their separate ways as Jack more frequently teamed with Spike Dudley to feud with Dudley Boyz. New Jack began dragging in a garbage can full of weapons and throwing it into the ring as a sort of ultra-violent trash bag.

==== Singles competition (1999–2001) ====
New Jack's feud with The Dudley Boyz continued in 1999 as he teamed with Spike Dudley to lose to them at Guilty as Charged. At Crossing the Line '99, Jack brought out his former Gangstas tag team partner Mustafa Saed to compete against Dudley Boyz but Mustafa turned on Jack by smashing a guitar on his head and revealed himself to be the mysterious benefactor of Dudleys, who wanted to run The Public Enemy and New Jack out of ECW. As a result, Jack began a rivalry with Mustafa, which culminated in a match between the two at Living Dangerously, which Jack won. At CyberSlam, Jack teamed with Hardcore Chair Swingin' Freaks (Axl Rotten and Balls Mahoney), losing an Ultimate Jeopardy match to Mustafa and the Dudleys. Afterward, Jack drove Mustafa through a table with a diving splash from the top of the cage. Jack was out of action for the next few months until he returned to ECW at Heat Wave, where he attacked Dudley Boyz with weapons from a shopping cart.

On the October 22 episode of ECW on TNN, Jack received his first opportunity for the World Heavyweight Championship against Mike Awesome but failed to win the title. On the November 5 episode of ECW on TNN, Jack rescued Hardcore Chair Swingin' Freaks from an attack by Da Baldies (The Spanish Angel, Vito LoGrasso, Tony DeVito and Vic Grimes) but Angel stapled Jack in the eyes. This led to a lengthy rivalry between Jack and Angel over the unofficial title of "King of the Streets". The two battled back and forth over the matter in bloody street fights. One of ECW television's most gruesome moments was when in the course of a match, Angel used New Jack's staple gun (which he often wore around his neck with a chain) against him, stapling him in the eye. Referees called off the match, and New Jack disappeared from the air for many months. New Jack returned by the end of 1999 with his eye seemingly recovered, now sporting a scythe around his neck, claiming that he had "upgraded" the staple gun.

Their first encounter was at November to Remember, where Jack and the Freaks lost to Da Baldies in a handicap match. At the 2000 Guilty as Charged pay-per-view, Jack lost a singles match to Angel due to interference by Da Baldies. At the Living Dangerously live pay-per-view in Danbury, Connecticut on March 12, New Jack suffered serious injuries during a match against Vic Grimes involving a bump that required them to jump and fall 15 feet off a scaffold. Mere seconds before the jump, Grimes became reluctant to take this very risky bump, and New Jack, annoyed with Grimes's reluctance (because of the live broadcast they had no time to improvise) dragged Grimes down with him after a count of three, and Grimes awkwardly fell half a second after Jack instead of falling together in the safest fashion. They fell off the scaffold, missed the tables that were supposed to absorb the force of their fall and landed on the concrete floor, with Grimes landing on New Jack's head. New Jack suffered brain damage, a broken leg, a skull fracture (resulting in permanent insomnia) and was permanently blinded in his right eye, and spent six months recovering, but even while injured Jack defeated Da Baldies leader Angel in a match two months later at Hardcore Heaven.

He appeared at Heat Wave where he appeared on crutches and Angel stapled him with his staple gun in the forehead until Nova and Chris Chetti made the save and defeated Da Baldies in a tag team match. Jack was out of action for the next few months. He returned to ECW on the September 22 episode of ECW on TNN, where he rescued Spike Dudley from an assault by Justin Credible and Rhino but was double teamed by the two. Jack was named the number one contender for Rhino's World Television Championship at November to Remember, where he failed to win the title. In his last ECW match, Jack defeated longtime rival Angel on the December 17 episode of Hardcore TV. Jack remained with the promotion which was closed due to bankruptcy a month later in January 2001.

=== Xtreme Pro Wrestling and the independent circuit (2001–2012) ===
After ECW declared bankruptcy in April 2001, New Jack began wrestling on the independent circuit. In 2001 and 2002, he wrestled for Xtreme Pro Wrestling, and in 2003, he made multiple appearances with Total Nonstop Action Wrestling and also Combat Zone Wrestling, competing in Cage of Death V. In 2004, Jack appeared in IWA and WWE in dark matches. He worked the ECW reunion show, Hardcore Homecoming, on June 10, 2005, as well as competing on the "Extreme Reunion" tour from September 15 to 16.

==== XPW Freefall incident with Vic Grimes ====
In February 2002, Jack met Vic Grimes in a scaffold match at XPW's Freefall event. As the final maneuver of the match, Jack shocked Grimes with a taser before throwing him from the scaffold and sending him crashing to the ring 40 feet below; there were over twelve tables stacked on top of each other in the ring to break the fall, of which Grimes missed all but two and came within a foot of missing the ring completely, which could have killed him. Grimes broke his fall on the top rope, dislocating his ankle among other injuries. In the 2005 documentary Forever Hardcore and the 2020 episode of Dark Side of the Ring centered around him, Jack claimed that this was a break from the script, and he intended to throw Grimes so hard that he would fall head-first onto the steel turnbuckle and be killed. This was done, according to Jack, over a grudge based on Grimes not contacting him when he was recovering from his injuries after their fall in Danbury. However, Art O'Donnell, a writer for WrestleCrap, disputes this, citing Jack's apparent concern for Grimes' safety in a previous match for XPW and how intentional the spot seemed.

==== Gypsy Joe incident ====
In April 2003, New Jack participated in a hardcore match with veteran wrestler Gypsy Joe. Before the match, Jack met Joe and asked the booker of the show what he was supposed to do with him. Jack was told "Gypsy Joe is as tough as leather", and Jack replied that he was not going to lose dollar value from this match and would not have a comedy or gimmick match, but that he would "kill" Joe in the match. For unknown reasons, Joe continuously no-sold New Jack during that match, and Joe headbutted Jack in the nose. Jack then got angry with Joe and decided to get genuine sells by legitimately attacking the 69-year-old man with a chain, a framed picture of his aunt, a baseball bat wrapped in barbed wire, and several other weapons. The crowd, horrified by Jack's savage beating of this man either left the show in disgust or started calling Jack a nigger. In an interview for Dark Side of the Ring in 2019, Jack stated "the more they called me a nigger, the angrier I got and the more I beat the guy up."

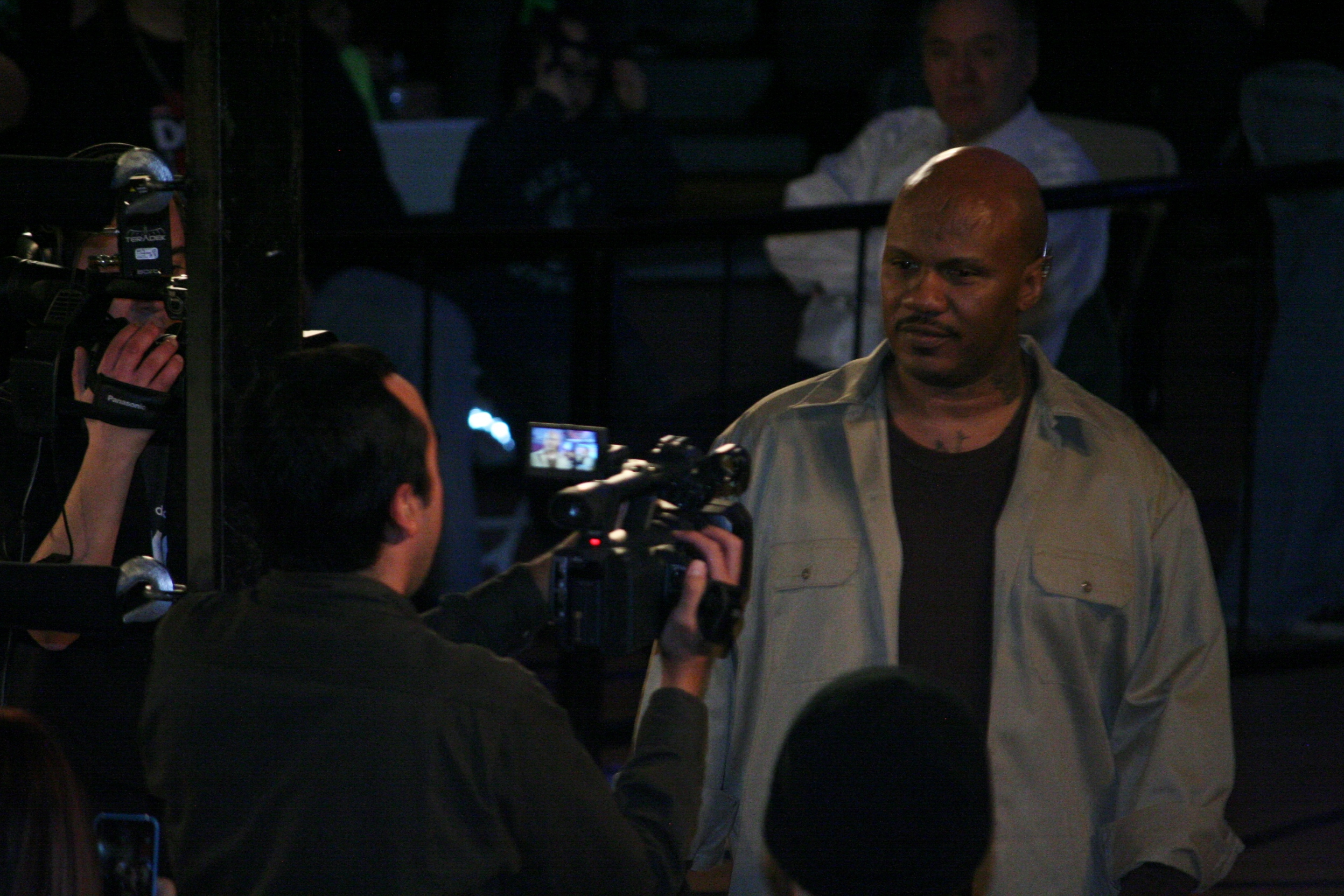
New Jack at a Pro Wrestling Syndicate show in 2014

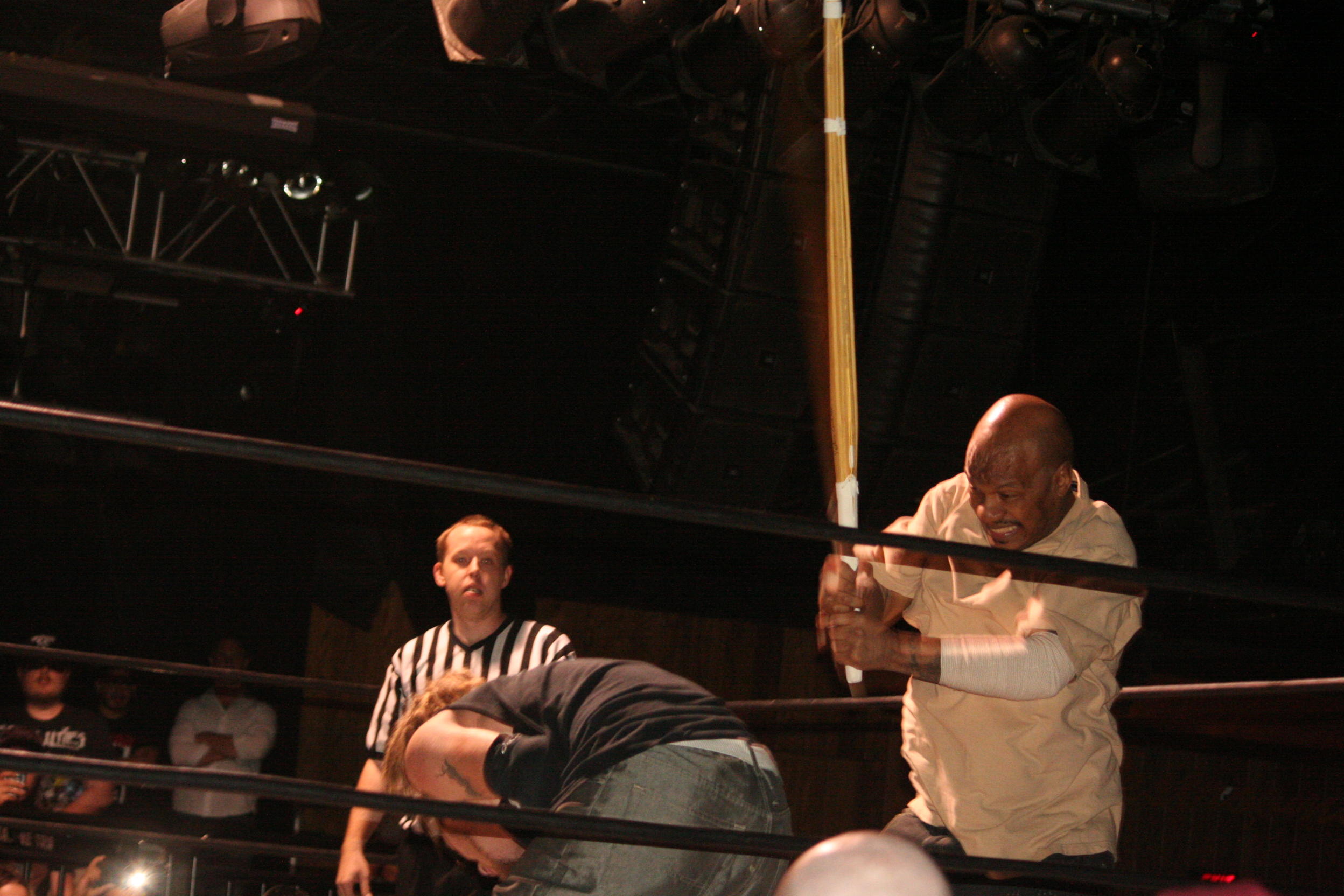
New Jack vs Necro Butcher in 2015

==== Stabbing of William Jason ====
In October 2004, New Jack, wrestling for Thunder Wrestling Federation, was scheduled to fight fellow wrestler William Jason Lane at an event near Jacksonville, Florida. During the match, Lane, to New Jack's surprise began punching him in the face legitimately and landed a few blows. New Jack then pulled out a metal blade from his camouflage wrestling attire, and stabbed Lane multiple times in the head. New Jack stated in the Vice documentary series Dark Side of the Ring that the news stated he stabbed Lane 16 times, but New Jack stated it was 9, because he counted. This action caused New Jack to receive a felony charge for aggravated battery. New Jack claimed that the two met prior to the match and agreed to use a "piece of metal" to inflict injury. Despite this, a police officer who was recording the incident stated that it looked like it went "past a routine wrestling match." The promoter of the event, Mr. Maurice Williams, claims the event was never intended to be hardcore. New Jack claims Lane declined to press charges after a jail house conversation. Lane asked New Jack to go on the road doing a series of shows with the stabbing as a gimmicked feud between them. New Jack agreed on the condition Lane refused to press charges or cooperate with the police. After Lane dropped the charges against New Jack, New Jack was released and left Florida without following through on his promise to Lane.

New Jack announced his retirement on XPW's A Cold Day to Hell in 2008 though he continued working independent shows. In 2012, New Jack competed for Extreme Rising and CZW.

=== Total Nonstop Action Wrestling (2003, 2010) ===
During 2003, New Jack wrestled occasional events for TNA wrestling. On the April 2, 2003, NWA-TNA, New Jack, Perry Saturn and The Sandman defeated Christopher Daniels and The Harris Brothers. On the April 9 NWA-TNA, New Jack and Sandman lost a three-way match to The Harris Brothers. On the April 16 NWA-TNA, New Jack and The Sandman lost to Brian Lee and Slash. on the April 23 NWA-TNA, New Jack, Perry Saturn and The Sandman defeated Brian Lee, Slash and Mike Awesome in an Ultimate Sin match. on the May 7 NWA-TNA, New Jack competed in a 3-way hardcore rules match which was won by Sabu. on the May 21 NWA-TNA, New Jack and Shark Boy lost to Ron Killings and Don Harris in an Anarchy Alliance tag match. Then he competed in the Hard 10 tournament defeating Slash in the Quarter-finals then defeated Mike Sanders in the Semi-finals before losing in the finals to The Sandman. On the July 16 NWA-TNA, New Jack (also wearing a shark mask) and Shark Boy lost to The Harris Brothers in what was New Jack's final TNA match.

On August 8, 2010, New Jack appeared at TNA's ECW reunion show, Hardcore Justice, where he and Mustafa assaulted Team 3D and Joel Gertner after a match.

=== Return to professional wrestling (2016–2021) ===
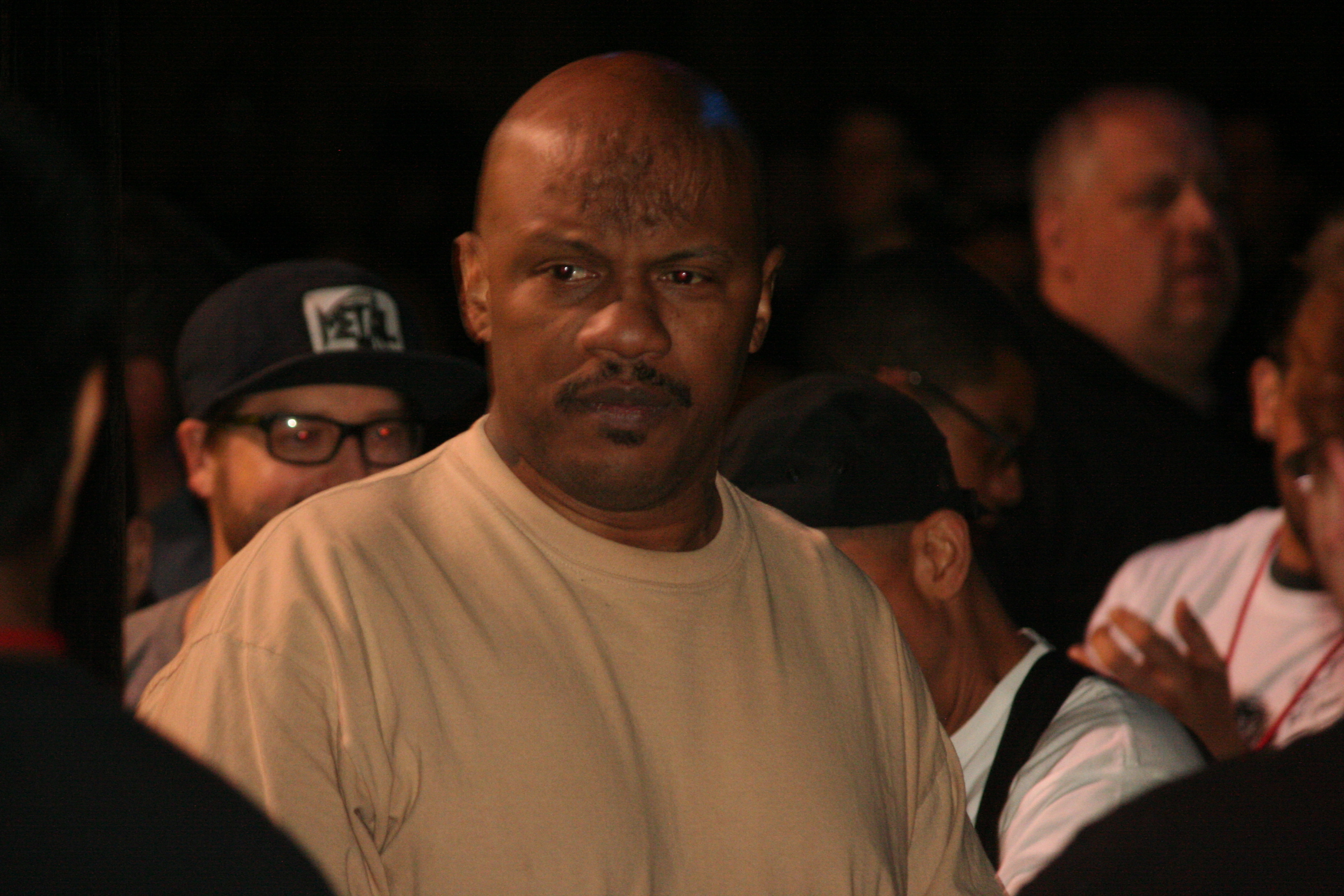
New Jack in 2016

On April 16, 2016, New Jack appeared in and wrestled for Money Mark Productions, facing Brad Cash in Lewisburg, Tennessee. On June 11, 2016, New Jack was set to face former UFC star Phil Baroni in an unsanctioned match at a Pro Wrestling Syndicate event at the Starland Ballroom in Sayreville, New Jersey. In October, New Jack made an appearance at the Crushed 2 wrestling event in Minneapolis, where he interfered in a match between Eugene and Tommy Lee Curtis. Running out with a garbage can full of weaponry, New Jack helped save Eugene from a beat down and did a diving splash through a table to pin Tommy Lee Curtis, although he was only interfering throughout the match and not being an actual competitor; this was billed as his last appearance in the Midwest.

Around that same year, when Young was walking home from a wrestling event, he collapsed, and doctors found blood clots throughout his legs, back, and lungs, saying "With the heart trouble I already had, I could feel myself getting close to the final bell". In January, Jack was eliminated in a battle royal by White Mike, with Jack subsequently going on to defeat Mike in a singles match. In March, he teamed with fellow ECW alumni The Sandman and Justin Credible in a winning effort at an ECW show, and made an appearance in VIP Wrestling where he defeated Masada. In his final matches leading up to his death, Jack faced fellow ECW alumni C. W. Anderson and Shane Douglas before taking time off due to surgery.

== Other media ==
In the video game ECW Anarchy Rulz, New Jack's theme song was rerecorded by Bootsy Collins with unique lyrics; this was unlike every other character's theme, which consisted of cover versions of their real themes. The real theme ("Natural Born Killaz") could not be featured; copyright issues from their record labels wouldn't allow it. New Jack was featured in the 1999 wrestling documentary Beyond the Mat. In addition, he appeared in the television series Early Edition on May 6, 2000, as a biker in the episode "Mel Schwartz, Bounty Hunter". He was also featured in the video games Backyard Wrestling 2: There Goes the Neighborhood, WWE 2K25 (as downloadable content), and WWE 2K26. New Jack is also the subject of an episode of the documentary series Dark Side of the Ring. The hour-long episode debuted on Vice on March 31, 2020.

New Jack is referenced in the 1996 Weezer single "El Scorcho", with the line "watchin' Grunge legdrop New Jack through a press table". He is also referenced by Harlem rapper Smoke DZA on his album Rugby Thompson.

Along with indie wrestler Jay Lover, New Jack made a guest appearance on the May 9, 2014, episode of The Daily Show, in a segment entitled "Stay Out of School."

== Views ==
In 2008, Young took part in a shoot interview with The Iron Sheik and The Honky Tonk Man where the Chris Benoit double-murder and suicide was discussed. Young commented that nothing could excuse what Benoit had done, and anybody in WWE or elsewhere defending Benoit or the wrestling business from public scrutiny were hypocrites. He also thought it was ironic how ECW was seen as a violent and dangerous promotion where drug use was encouraged, yet there was only one person who died during Young's five-year tenure with the company, whereas WWE was "averaging three (deaths) a year." In the same interview, Young accused then WWE chairman and CEO Vince McMahon of murder and falsifying wrestlers' drug tests.

Young was critical of Paul Heyman as a promoter, primarily due to Heyman's penchant for lying to his roster, as well as for cheating them out of paychecks. In 2012, Young criticized Abdullah the Butcher for using dirty blades on wrestlers and stating that Young was HIV positive.

== Personal life, health issues and death ==
From 2009 to 2011, Young was in a relationship with Terri Runnels; after the relationship ended, Runnels filed a lawsuit against Young for libel and to block distribution of sexually explicit photos he had of Runnels.

Young was married to Jennifer Young. One of his sons, a drag queen named Washington Heights, revealed in 2020 that Young had disowned him a few years earlier due to being a drag queen. Young responded to the claims stating, "My son was mentioned in my book that just came out last year, so the statement about me disowning him three years ago is simply not true." Heights stated after Young's death that "he was proud of me... He wanted to fix things but didn't know how".

After retiring, Young regularly used prescribed painkillers to help with the pain from various injuries he sustained during his career. In 2016, he collapsed while walking home from an event. He was diagnosed with blood clots in his legs and back, in addition to heart problems. Tommy Dreamer revealed that when he tried to book Young for his House of Hardcore promotion, Young said he was in poor health and often bedridden due to his heart problems and failing vision.

On May 14, 2021, Young died in Greensboro, North Carolina after being found unresponsive at a friend's residence. According to the North Carolina Office of the Chief Medical Examiner's investigative report, a witness told investigators that the two had obtained crack cocaine before returning to the residence, where Young later lay down on a couch. He was subsequently found unresponsive on the floor, and despite CPR by emergency responders, he was pronounced dead at the scene. Investigators reported finding drug paraphernalia in the residence and stated there were no signs of foul play. No full autopsy was performed; instead, the Office of the Chief Medical Examiner conducted a second external examination and toxicology testing. A later OCME review identifies the cause of death as cocaine and fentanyl toxicity with the manner of death classified as accident.

== Championships and accomplishments ==
- American Championship Pro Wrestling
  - ACPW Hardcore Championship (1 time)
- Extreme Championship Wrestling
  - ECW World Tag Team Championship (3 times) – with Mustafa Saed (2) and John Kronus (1)
- North Georgia Wrestling Association
  - NGWA Heavyweight Championship (1 time)
  - NGWA Tag Team Championship (2 times) – with Festus and Mustafa Saed
- Smoky Mountain Wrestling
  - SMW Tag Team Championship (1 time) – with Mustafa Saed
- Universal Championship Wrestling
  - UCW Hardcore Championship (1 time)
- United States Wrestling Association
  - USWA World Tag Team Championship (1 time) – with Home Boy
- Pro Wrestling Illustrated
  - Ranked No. 101 of the top 500 singles wrestlers in the PWI 500 in 1997
  - Ranked No. 386 of the top 500 singles wrestlers of the PWI Years in 2003

== Bibliography ==
- Jack, New; Norman, Jason (2020). New Jack: Memoir of a Pro Wrestling Extremist. McFarland and Company Inc. pp. 29–34. ISBN 978-1-4766-7977-8.

== See also ==
- List of premature professional wrestling deaths
