= John Kronus =

American professional wrestler (1969–2007)

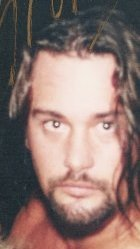
- Kronus in 1995

Personal information
- Born: George B. Caiazzo; January 13, 1969 Everett, Massachusetts, U.S.
- Died: July 18, 2007 (aged 38) Laconia, New Hampshire, U.S.
- Cause of death: Heart failure
- Children: 1

Professional wrestling career
- Ring name(s): The Eliminator; John Kronus
- Billed height: 6 ft 4 in (1.93 m)
- Billed weight: 256 lb (116 kg)
- Billed from: Boston, Massachusetts
- Trained by: Killer Kowalski
- Debut: 1989
- Retired: 2005

George B. Caiazzo (January 13, 1969 – July 18, 2007) was an American professional wrestler, better known by his ring name, John Kronus, and later simply Kronus. Caiazzo worked for Extreme Championship Wrestling, the United States Wrestling Association and Xtreme Pro Wrestling. He was perhaps best known as one-half of the tag team The Eliminators with Perry Saturn.

== Early life ==
Caiazzo's father, George Caiazzo Sr., played football with the New York Giants before suffering an injury.

== Professional wrestling career ==
=== Early career (1989-1994) ===
In the late 1980s, Caiazzo met professional wrestler Perry Saturn when he began working as a bouncer in a Boston nightclub managed by Saturn. Caiazzo expressed an interest in becoming a wrestler to Saturn, who responded by directing Caiazzo to a professional wrestling school operated by Killer Kowalski. Caiazzo debuted in 1989, briefly wrestling as "The Eliminator". In the early 1990s, Saturn offered to form a tag team with Caiazzo. The Greek equivalent of the Roman deity Saturn was Cronus, so Saturn chose the ring name "John Kronus" for Caiazzo. As Saturn and Kronus were their civilizations' respective harvest deities, Saturn proposed that the tag team be known as "The Harvesters of Sorrow". After promoter Jerry Lawler advised Saturn that the significance of the name would not be evident to many fans, Saturn named the team "The Eliminators".

The Eliminators wrestled their first match together at a United States Wrestling Association house show in 1993. They were hired at a starting salary of $40 a week (they later negotiated a 100% pay raise), and shared an apartment with four other wrestlers. On May 2, 1994, The Eliminators defeated Brian Christopher and Eddie Gilbert for the USWA Tag Team Championship. They held the USWA World Tag Team Championship until June 13, 1994, when they were defeated by PG-13.

=== WAR (1994–1995) ===
In 1994 and 1995, The Eliminators wrestled in Japan for the WAR promotion.

=== Extreme Championship Wrestling (1995-1999) ===
==== The Eliminators (1995–1997) ====
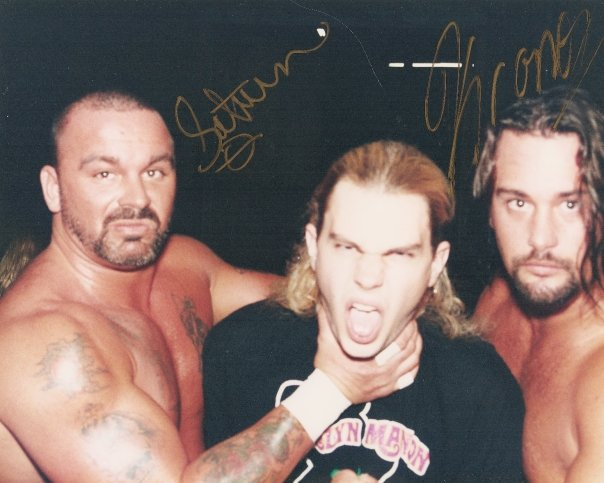
Kronus and Perry Saturn with a fan

The Eliminators debuted in the Philadelphia, Pennsylvania-based Extreme Championship Wrestling promotion at Gangstas Paradise in September 1995. They were initially brought in to job to the Steiner Brothers but after it became apparent that Steiners were leaving ECW, the Eliminators were booked to win their debut match, a six-man tag team match, which pitted Eliminators with Jason against Taz and the Steiner Brothers. ECW promoter Paul Heyman quickly abandoned plans to give them a sadism and masochism character and instead booked them as an unstoppable force in the ECW tag team division. They were managed by Jason. The Eliminators won the ECW Tag Team Championship on three occasions between 1996 and 1997, feuding with teams such as the Dudley Boyz, the Gangstas, the Pitbulls, Sabu and Rob Van Dam and the Steiner Brothers. On May 31, 1997, Saturn tore his anterior cruciate ligament during a match. After intense reconstructive surgery, he was given a recovery time of up to a year. Kronus briefly defended the ECW Tag Team Championship single-handedly before losing to the Dudley Boyz. In late 1997, Saturn left ECW for World Championship Wrestling.

==== The Gangstanators (1997–1999) ====
Kronus competed in the singles division, losing to ECW World Television Champion Taz by submission at Orgy of Violence in June 1997, before forming a new tag team, "the Gangstanators", with New Jack. The Gangstanators won the ECW Tag Team Championship in September 1997 at As Good as It Gets.

Kronus left ECW in March 1999.

=== Later Career (1999–2002) ===
He joined the California-based Xtreme Pro Wrestling promotion in 1999. In 2000, Kronus aligned himself with the "Black Army" faction. He remained with XPW until leaving in 2001. During this period, Kronus appeared in the 2000 softcore bondage film Violence on Violence. Also in 2000, Kronus worked for the hardcore promotion Combat Zone Wrestling. Kronus also helped develop and promote local Philadelphia, Pennsylvania company Dangerously Intense Wrestling. During his time as champion he feuded with G.O.D.D., Method and The Sickness. Kronus held both the DIW World Heavyweight Title and Inner City Title.

=== Retirement ===
In 2002, Kronus retired from professional wrestling, relocating to the Lakes Region in Sanbornton, New Hampshire. He temporarily came out of retirement in 2005, making two appearances with the ECW reunion promotion Hardcore Homecoming. His last match was a loss to Balls Mahoney.

== Death ==
Caiazzo was found dead in his fiancée Brandy Laundry's home in Laconia, New Hampshire on July 18, 2007, several days after undergoing knee surgery. He was 38 years old. Caiazzo died in his sleep. According to an autopsy, his death was attributed to heart failure resulting from an enlarged heart. He was survived by his nine-year-old son, Gage Christian Caiazzo. His family stated that Kronus had a history of heart problems and that he knew he could die at any time. Former tag team partner New Jack was the only ECW alumnus to attend his funeral.

== Championships and accomplishments ==
- Dangerously Intense Wrestling
  - DIW Heavyweight Champion (1 time)
  - DIW Inner City Champion (1 time)
- Extreme Championship Wrestling
  - ECW World Tag Team Championship (4 times) – with Perry Saturn (3 times) and New Jack (1 time)
- Mayhem Independent Wrestling
  - MIW Hardcore Championship (1 time, last)
- Pro Wrestling Illustrated
  - PWI ranked him No. 73 of the top 500 wrestlers of the year in the PWI 500 in 1997
  - PWI ranked him No. 382 of the 500 best singles wrestlers of the PWI Years in 2003
  - PWI ranked him No. 89 of the 100 best tag teams of the PWI Years in 2003 with Perry Saturn
- United States Wrestling Association
  - USWA World Tag Team Championship (1 time) – with Perry Saturn

== See also ==
- List of premature professional wrestling deaths
