= Mustafa Saed =

American professional wrestler

Personal information
- Born: Terrance Ladd Blalock; September 30, 1963 (age 62) Kings Mountain, North Carolina, United States

Professional wrestling career
- Ring name(s): Jamal Mustafa; Mr. Mustafa; Mustafa; Mustafa Saaid; Mustafa Saed; Mustapha Saed; Sheikh Mustafa Ali; Terrence Blalock
- Billed height: 6 ft 4 in (193 cm)
- Billed weight: 265 lb (120 kg)
- Billed from: South Central, Los Angeles, California, United States
- Trained by: Gene Anderson
- Debut: August 6, 1990

Jamal Mustafa (born Terrance Ladd Blalock; September 30, 1963), better known by his ring name Mustafa Saed, is an American professional wrestler. He is best known for his appearances with Smoky Mountain Wrestling and Extreme Championship Wrestling in the 1990s.

== Professional wrestling career ==
=== Early career (1990–1991) ===
Mustafa was trained as a professional wrestler by Gene Anderson. He made his debut on the August 18 (taped August 6), 1990 episode of WCW Worldwide teaming with Scott Williams in a match against WCW World Tag Team Champions Doom. He would make his singles debut against J.W. Storm on the October 27, 1990 edition of World Championship Wrestling. Saed also appeared with the World Wrestling Federation.

=== World Championship Wrestling (1992–1993) ===
In November 1992, Saed began appearing with World Championship Wrestling as a Carpenter. Wrestling primarily on WCW Saturday Night, with occasional appearances on WCW Main Event and WCW Worldwide, he lost to opponents such as 2 Cold Scorpio, Cactus Jack, Davey Boy Smith, Erik Watts, and Van Hammer. Saed left WCW in May 1993.

=== Smoky Mountain Wrestling (1994–1995) ===
In 1994 at Smoky Mountain Wrestling, the pairing of Saed, New Jack and, for a brief time, D'Lo Brown were collectively known as The Gangstas. A controversial gimmick, the Gangstas would cut promos about activist Medgar Evers and O. J. Simpson to infuriate the southern white crowd, they would also use fried chicken and watermelons as props and would win matches via only a two count rather than the conventional three count purportedly due to Affirmative Action. The Gangstas would feud with The Rock 'n' Roll Express for several months in chase of the SMW Tag Team Championship which they would eventually win on October 3 but would lose the titles back the Rock 'n' Roll Express two months later. After the loss, the Gangstas would feud with teams such as Tony Anthony and Tracy Smothers and The Heavenly Bodies. In 1995 The Gangstas, now consisting of only Saed and New Jack, left SMW in a controversial fashion which escalated the long-standing dispute between Paul Heyman and Jim Cornette.

=== Extreme Championship Wrestling (1995–1997, 1999) ===
Making their Extreme Championship Wrestling debut on June 27 at Barbed Wire, Hoodies & Chokeslams, and their Hardcore TV debut on July 20, the Gangstas would quickly become faces and a draw for ECW, regularly bringing weapons such as guitars, crutches and staple guns in trash cans and shopping carts to the ring. The Gangstas would enter a lengthy feud with the Public Enemy that would last until the beginning of 1996 where the Public Enemy would beat the Gangstas in a street fight. Several months later the Gangstas would feud with the Eliminators, challenging them for the ECW World Tag Team Championship on several occasions before finally winning them on August 3 at The Doctor Is In. Although they lost the titles several months later in December, they would become two-time champions on July 19, 1997 at Heat Wave. Following the loss of the second championship, Saed split with New Jack and left ECW.

Saed would return to ECW on February 12, 1999 at Crossing the Line '99 in Queens, New York. Mustafa reunited with New Jack to battle the Dudley Boys, only for Mustafa to attack his partner, revealing himself as the mysterious benefactor who wanted to run the Public Enemy and New Jack out of ECW. Now known as Mr. Mustafa, he would be defeated by New Jack at Living Dangerously 1999 and leave the company again by May.

=== Independent circuit (1997–2001) ===
After ECW, Saed worked for National Wrestling Conference untl the promotion folded in 1998. Saed would wrestle for the top Puerto Rican promotion, World Wrestling Council between 1999 and 2001 where he would win the WWC Puerto Rico Heavyweight Championship once, the WWC World Television Championship once and the WWC World Tag Team Championship once with Rastaman. In 2000, Saed would go on his first and only tour of Japan with Big Japan Pro Wrestling where he participated in the World Extreme Cup 2000. He would retire from wrestling in 2001.

=== Later Career (2008–present) ===
In 2008, he returned to wrestling for one night teaming with New Jack at XPW show.

On August 8, 2010, Saed and New Jack reunited for a single night at the Total Nonstop Action Wrestling pay-per-view Hardcore Justice, assaulting Team 3D and Joel Gertner after a match.

Saed then came out of retirement in 2011 and began wrestling full-time.

Since 2015, Saed went on to make regular appearances with Supreme Pro Wrestling, based out of Elk Grove, California.

== Championships and accomplishments ==
- All Pro Wrestling
  - APW/Vendetta Pro Unified Tag Team Championship (1 time) - with Boyce LeGrande
  - APW Tag Team Championship (1 time) - with Boyce LeGrande
- Coastal Pro Wrestling
  - CPW Television Championship (1 time)
- Extreme Championship Wrestling
  - ECW World Tag Team Championship (2 times) - with New Jack
- Extreme Wrestling Alliance
  - EWA Heavyweight Championship (3 times)
- North Georgia Wrestling Alliance
  - NGWA Tag Team Championship (1 time) - with New Jack
- Pro Wrestling Bushido
  - PWB Tag Team Championship (1 time) - with Cjay Kurz
- Pro Wrestling Illustrated
  - Ranked No. 427 of the 500 best singles wrestlers during the PWI Years in 2003
- Smoky Mountain Wrestling
  - SMW Tag Team Championship (1 time) - with New Jack
- Supreme Pro Wrestling
  - SPW Tag Team Championship (1 time) - with RJ Bishop
- Vendetta Pro Wrestling
  - Unified Tag-Team Championship (1 time) - with Boyce LeGrande
- World Wrestling Council
  - WWC Puerto Rico Heavyweight Championship (1 time)
  - WWC World Tag Team Championship (1 time) - with Rastaman
  - WWC World Television Championship (1 time)
