= CyberSlam =

Extreme Championship Wrestling event series

- Promotions: Extreme Championship Wrestling
- First event: CyberSlam (1996)
- Last event: CyberSlam (2000)
- Event gimmick: Wrestling fan convention

CyberSlam was a professional wrestling supercard event and fan convention produced by Extreme Championship Wrestling (ECW) from 1996 to 2000.

== Background ==
It began in 1995 with the Double Tables event, held at the ECW Arena. The event was held for those who were posting on Usenet's rec.sport.pro-wrestling to be able to meet performers in person and see some live pro wrestling. ECW's Tod Gordon assisted the ECW fans in organizing this. Prior to the ECW Arena show on February 4, 1995, there was a show held at the Flagstaff in Jim Thorpe, Pennsylvania. The red shirts seen on some wrestlers and fans say "To The Extreme" and was the nickname given to the event. In addition to the two shows, there was also a question-and-answer session held at the ECW Arena itself. The main guests were Tod Gordon, the Sandman and The Public Enemy. Once the wrestlers began to arrive for the show, they came out to mingle and chat with the fans. Another event was held during the summer of 1995, called "Back to the Extreme". This time, the Q&A session was held at the Holiday Inn in Essington, Pennsylvania.

In 1996, Paul Heyman christened the event "CyberSlam". There were two events of CyberSlam in 1997. Every year, the convention included a question and answer session.

== Dates, venues and main events ==
Event	Date	City	Venue	Main event
CyberSlam (1996)	February 17, 1996	ECW Arena	Philadelphia, Pennsylvania	Raven (c) vs. The Sandman for the ECW World Heavyweight Championship
CyberSlam (1997)	February 21, 1997	Lost Battalion Hall	Queens, New York	The Eliminators (Perry Saturn and John Kronus) (c) vs. Sabu and Rob Van Dam for the ECW Tag Team Championship
CyberSlam (1997)	February 22, 1997	ECW Arena	Philadelphia, Pennsylvania	Sabu vs. Chris Candido
CyberSlam (1998)	February 21, 1998	ECW Arena	Philadelphia, Pennsylvania	Shane Douglas and Bam Bam Bigelow vs. Sabu and Rob Van Dam
CyberSlam (1999)	April 3, 1999	ECW Arena	Philadelphia, Pennsylvania	The Dudley Boyz (Buh Buh Ray Dudley and D-Von Dudley) and Mr. Mustafa vs. New Jack and Hardcore Chair Swingin' Freaks (Axl Rotten and Balls Mahoney) in an Ultimate Jeopardy match
CyberSlam (2000)	April 22, 2000	ECW Arena	Philadelphia, Pennsylvania	Tommy Dreamer (c) vs. Justin Credible for the ECW World Heavyweight Championship
(c) – refers to the champion(s) heading into the match

== See also ==
- List of professional wrestling conventions
