= CyberSlam (2000) =

2000 Extreme Championship Wrestling supercard event

- The ECW Arena.
- Promotion: Extreme Championship Wrestling
- Date: April 22, 2000
- City: Philadelphia, Pennsylvania
- Venue: ECW Arena
- Attendance: 1,600

CyberSlam chronology
← Previous; 1999	Next → Final

Event chronology
← Previous; Wrestlepalooza	Next → A New Era Begins

CyberSlam (2000) was the fifth and final CyberSlam professional wrestling event produced by Extreme Championship Wrestling (ECW). The event took place on April 22, 2000 at the ECW Arena in Philadelphia, Pennsylvania.

The scheduled main event of CyberSlam saw ECW mainstay Tommy Dreamer defeat Taz to win his first ECW World Heavyweight Championship. Taz, who had signed with the World Wrestling Federation earlier that year, won the championship from Mike Awesome, who had signed with World Championship Wrestling. As Dreamer celebrated his victory, Justin Credible attacked him before challenging him to an impromptu match. Credible defeated Dreamer after Francine turned on him, ending Dreamer's title reign just a few minutes after it had begun.

== Storylines ==
The event featured wrestlers from pre-existing scripted feuds and storylines. Wrestlers portrayed villains, heroes, or less distinguishable characters in the scripted events that built tension and culminated in a wrestling match or series of matches played out on ECW's television program Hardcore TV.

The event featured continuation of several rivalries including the feud between New Jack and Da Baldies (Angel, Tony DeVito and Vic Grimes) which had been going on since late 1999.

On the April 14 episode of ECW on TNN, Yoshihiro Tajiri defeated Super Crazy and Little Guido in a three-way dance to win the World Television Championship. After the win, Cyrus announced that Tajiri would hand over the title to The Network at CyberSlam.

== Event ==
=== Preliminary matches ===
In the opening match, Masato Tanaka and 2 Cold Scorpio returned to ECW to compete against each other. Tanaka nailed a Diamond Dust to Scorpio for the win.

Next, Nova and Jazz took on Lance Storm and Dawn Marie in a mixed tag team match. Jason and Chris Chetti got involved in the match and began brawling with each other. Nova attempted to execute a Kryptonite Krunch on Storm but Credible superkicked Nova and then Nova and Storm both fell on the mat and Storm's neck landed badly. Jazz attempted a kneeling reverse piledriver on Marie but Credible caned her and Marie pinned Jazz for the win.

Next, a three-way dance took place between Super Crazy, Kid Kash and Little Guido. Crazy hit a brainbuster to Kash to cause the first elimination of the match. After a back and forth match between Crazy and Guido, Sal E. Graziano got involved who launched Crazy on a table and Guido drove Crazy through the table by diving from Graziano's shoulders onto the table outside the ring. Guido then hit a Maritado for the win.

Next was a tag team match, pitting Danny Doring and Roadkill against The New Dangerous Alliance (Billy Wiles and C. W. Anderson). Roadkill was about to hit an Amish Splash on Wiles but Anderson clocked him with Lou E. Dangerously's cell phone to knock him out. Anderson then hit an Anderson Spinebuster to Doring for the win. After the match, Roadkill ripped off Elektra's coat, revealing her undergarments and Roadkill was about to hit an Amish Splash on Elektra until Da Baldies (DeVito and Angel) attacked Roadkill and shoved him from the top onto the table. New Jack then made the save and brawled with Da Baldies. After a back and forth brawl, Jack hit a 187 on DeVito for the win. After the match, Angel attacked Jack until Balls Mahoney returned to ECW and made the save.

Joey Styles and Joel Gertner conducted an interview with Steve Corino and Jack Victory in the ring. Dusty Rhodes then attacked Corino to begin a match between the two. Victory hit a cowbell in the head of Rhodes and Corino wrapped the bullrope around his elbow and nailed an elbow drop to Rhodes for the win. After the match, Victory set up tables in the ring and The Sandman showed up to fight Corino and Victory. Lori Fullington came to Sandman's rescue after he was being assaulted by Corino. Rhino stormed to the ring and drove both Sandman and Peaches through a table with a Spinebuster. Cyrus then came and demanded that Yoshihiro Tajiri hand over the World Television Championship to The Network. Tajiri refused and Rhino attacked Tajiri to begin a match for the title. Tajiri thwarted Corino and Victory's interference, allowing Rhino to hit two consecutive Piledrivers to Tajiri to win the title. After the match, Rob Van Dam attacked Network members and cleared the ring of them. Cyrus then announced that RVD would face Jerry Lynn at Hardcore Heaven.

=== Main event match ===
In the main event, Taz defended the World Heavyweight Championship against Tommy Dreamer. Dreamer pinned Taz with a sunset flip. After the match, Taz applauded Dreamer and presented him with the title belt and cut a promo in which he praised Dreamer and congratulated him on winning the title. Several wrestlers congratulated him on the title win and then left. Raven and Francine remained in the ring to celebrate the win until Justin Credible came along with Jason and attacked both Dreamer and Raven. He then threw down the World Tag Team Championship belt and challenged Dreamer to an immediate match for the World Heavyweight Championship, which Dreamer accepted. Dreamer was about to deliver a Dreamer Driver to Credible until Jason distracted the referee and Francine turned on Dreamer by low blowing him, allowing Credible to nail a That's Incredible to Dreamer to win the title.

== Aftermath ==
Lance Storm confronted Justin Credible on disrespecting the World Tag Team Championship on the May 5 episode of ECW on TNN. This would lead to a title match between the two at Hardcore Heaven, where Credible defeated Storm to retain the title. Storm then left ECW and Credible moved onto a feud with former champion Tommy Dreamer, who faced Credible for the title in a Stairway to Hell match at Heat Wave, where Credible retained the title against Dreamer.

== Results ==
No.	Results	Stipulations
1	Masato Tanaka defeated 2 Cold Scorpio	Singles match
2	Lance Storm and Dawn Marie defeated Nova and Jazz	Intergender match
3	Little Guido (with Sal E. Graziano) defeated Super Crazy and Kid Kash	Three-Way Dance
4	The New Dangerous Alliance (Billy Wiles and C. W. Anderson) (with Lou E. Dangerously and Elektra) defeated Danny Doring and Roadkill	Tag team match
5	Balls Mahoney and New Jack defeated Da Baldies (DeVito and Angel)	Tag team match
6	Steve Corino (with Jack Victory) defeated Dusty Rhodes	Singles match
7	Rhino defeated Yoshihiro Tajiri (c)	Singles match for the ECW World Television Championship
8	Tommy Dreamer (with Francine) defeated Taz (c)	Singles match for the ECW World Heavyweight Championship
9	Justin Credible (with Jason) defeated Tommy Dreamer (c) (with Francine)	Singles match for the ECW World Heavyweight Championship
(c) / – the champion(s) heading into the match
