= Heat Wave (2000) =

2000 Extreme Championship Wrestling pay-per-view event

- Promotion: Extreme Championship Wrestling
- Date: July 16, 2000
- City: Los Angeles, California
- Venue: Grand Olympic Auditorium
- Attendance: 5,700
- Buy rate: 60,000

Pay-per-view chronology
← Previous; Hardcore Heaven	Next → Anarchy Rulz

Heat Wave chronology
← Previous; 1999	Next → 2022

Heat Wave (2000) was the seventh Heat Wave professional wrestling pay-per-view (PPV) event produced by Extreme Championship Wrestling (ECW). The event took place on July 16, 2000 from the Grand Olympic Auditorium in Los Angeles, California and the final event to be held under the ECW banner.

Eight professional wrestling matches were contested at the event. The main event was a Stairway to Hell match, in which Justin Credible successfully defended the World Heavyweight Championship against Tommy Dreamer. On the undercard, Rob Van Dam defeated Scotty Anton and Rhino successfully defended the World Television Championship against The Sandman. This event was notable for the controversial incident between ECW wrestlers and the personnel from Xtreme Pro Wrestling although its wrestlers were not involved.

== Storylines ==
The event featured wrestlers from pre-existing scripted feuds and storylines. Wrestlers portrayed villains, heroes, or less distinguishable characters in the scripted events that built tension and culminated in a wrestling match or series of matches played out on ECW's television programs, Hardcore TV and ECW on TNN.

At CyberSlam, Justin Credible attacked Tommy Dreamer and challenged him to a match for the World Heavyweight Championship, right after Dreamer had just won the title. Credible ended up defeating Dreamer for the title after Francine turned on Dreamer. At Hardcore Heaven, Credible was scheduled to defend the title against Dreamer and Lance Storm in a three-way dance but threatened to throw down the ECW World Heavyweight Championship belt if Dreamer came to the ring to wrestle him. Credible then defeated Storm in Storm's last ECW match to retain the title. Dreamer hit a Dreamer Driver to Credible after the match. Credible successfully defended the title against Raven on the May 19 episode of ECW on TNN. Two weeks later, Credible attacked Raven with a That's Incredible until Dreamer made the save but was attacked by The Network. The following week on ECW on TNN, it was announced that Credible would defend the title against Dreamer in a Stairway to Hell match at Heat Wave.

At Hardcore Heaven, Rhino defeated The Sandman to retain the World Television Championship. On the May 28 episode of Hardcore TV, Cyrus named Kintaro Kanemura, the #1 contender for the World Television Championship and announced that Sandman would have to beat Kanemura in order to gain a title shot at Rhino. Sandman defeated Kanemura to become the #1 contender for the title. On the June 2 episode of ECW on TNN, Sandman received a title shot against Rhino but the match ended due to interference by The Network, Dusty Rhodes, Yoshihiro Tajiri and Rob Van Dam. This led to a match between Rhino and Sandman for the title at Heat Wave.

At Hardcore Heaven, Scotty Anton cost Rob Van Dam, a match against Jerry Lynn. Anton joined The Network and began attacking Network's rivals with his Clapper. On the June 9 episode of ECW on TNN, Anton interfered in a tag team match between Tommy Dreamer and The Sandman and the team of Justin Credible and Rhino until RVD attacked him and helped Dreamer and Sandman in winning the match. On the June 23 episode of ECW on TNN, it was announced that RVD would face Anton at Heat Wave and Cyrus predicted that RVD would receive a Clapper at the event. On the July 14 episode of ECW on TNN, RVD said that he had no respect for Anton and he would introduce him to the Van Terminator during their match.

== Event ==
=== Preliminary matches ===
In the opening match of the event, Balls Mahoney took on Sal E. Graziano. Graziano avoided Mahoney's chair shot and hit a chokeslam, an elbow drop and applied a bearhug for the quick victory.

Next, Kid Kash, Danny Doring and Roadkill competed against the team of Simon Diamond, C. W. Anderson and Johnny Swinger. Simon and Swinger attempted to hit a Problem Solver on Doring but Kash saved him from the move and Doring executed a Wham, Bam, Thank You Ma'am on Diamond. This allowed Kash to hit a Money Maker on Swinger for the win.

Next, Jerry Lynn took on Steve Corino. Jack Victory interfered on Corino's behalf by attempting to throw powder into Lynn but he ducked and the referee was knocked out with it instead. Lynn hit a belly-to-back suplex to Corino but could not pin him due to the referee being knocked out. Corino nailed Lynn with his boot and then Victory hit Lynn with a cowbell, which allowed Corino to get a near-fall on Lynn. Lynn attempted a cradle piledriver but Corino reversed it into a pinfall attempt. A series of near-falls led to Lynn hitting a cradle piledriver for the win.

After the match, the injured New Jack came on crutches but was attacked by Da Baldies (Tony DeVito and Angel) until Chris Chetti and Nova made the save for Jack, leading to a match pitting Chetti and Nova against Da Baldies. Nova hit a Third Degree to DeVito followed by Chetti hitting an Amityville Horror on Angel. Nova and Chetti then hit a Tidal Wave on Angel for the win.

Next, Yoshihiro Tajiri, Mikey Whipwreck, Little Guido and the returning Psicosis competed in a Four-Way Dance. Whipwreck knocked out all his three opponents with a plancha outside the ring until The Full Blooded Italians interfered in the match and Sal E. Graziano slammed him into the ring post. This allowed Psicosis to hit a Psycho Guillotine to Whipwreck and Guido pinned him for the first elimination. The action continued between the three men as Tajiri nailed a German suplex to Psicosis to eliminate him. After a back and forth action, Tajiri spit mist into Guido and hit a brainbuster on a steel chair for the win.

Later, Rhino defended the World Television Championship against The Sandman. Jack Victory and Steve Corino interfered on Rhino's behalf but Spike Dudley thwarted their interference as Dudley caned Victory and then Sandman and Dudley hit a 3D to Corino. Rhino then attempted a Gore on Sandman but he dodged it and Dudley was accidentally knocked out with the Gore. Rhino drove Dudley from the apron onto a table with a Rhino Spike. Sandman then hit Rhino with a cane and attempted a White Russian Legsweep; however, Rhino gave him a Rhino Spike on the guardrail then pinned him to retain the title.

In the penultimate match, Rob Van Dam took on Scotty Anton. Anton took out RVD's leg with a chair shot and then applied a Clapper on RVD. Bill Alfonso distracted Anton, allowing RVD to move out of the Clapper, so Anton applied a Clapper on Anton. RVD hit a Van Daminator and a Five Star Frog Splash and had the match won but then proceeded to debut his new move Van Terminator on Anton for the win.

=== XPW Incident ===
Prior to the main event, six performers from the Los Angeles-based Xtreme Pro Wrestling promotion, (Note: The Messiah, Kid Kaos, Supreme, Kristi Myst, Homeless Jimmy and XPW announcer Kris Kloss) who were given front row tickets by promotion owner Rob Black, donned shirts of their promotion, which caught the attention of Tommy Dreamer and ECW security and were promptly ejected. A brawl in the parking lot of the Grand Olympic Auditorium between the XPW crew and the ECW locker room followed.

=== Main event match ===
This was followed by Justin Credible defending the World Heavyweight Championship against Tommy Dreamer in a Stairway to Hell match. George turned on Dreamer by hugging Francine and then Jazz knocked out both women. Credible then nailed a That's Incredible to Jazz, leaving the brawl to Credible and Dreamer. Credible executed a That's Incredible to Dreamer on the barbed wire to retain the title.

== Reception ==
Arnold Furious of Wrestling Recaps wrote "This is a thumbs in the middle effort. It’s not terrible by any stretch of the imagination but no one match stands out particularly. It’s made memorable by the odd spot but not by any of the matches. There is a lot that needs to be fast-forwarded."

Scott Keith of 411Mania wrote "Thumbs in the middle, leaning up for some decent action, but the lack of a great match keeps it from going up."

== Aftermath ==
Rob Van Dam began feuding with Rhino over the World Television Championship since RVD never lost the title and was stripped off the title due to injury. On the September 8 episode of ECW on TNN, Rhino lost the title to Kid Kash due to assistance by RVD. Two weeks later, Rhino defeated Kash to regain the title. At Anarchy Rulz, Rhino defeated RVD to retain the title.

On the August 25 episode of ECW on TNN, Jerry Lynn was named the number one contender to Justin Credible's World Heavyweight Championship at Anarchy Rulz due to the event taking place in Lynn's home state of Minnesota. Lynn defeated Credible to capture the title.

A tournament was set up for the vacant ECW World Tag Team Championship in August. The Unholy Alliance (Yoshihiro Tajiri and Mikey Whipwreck) won the tournament for the vacant titles on September 1 episode of ECW on TNN. They lost the titles a week later to The Full Blooded Italians (Little Guido and Tony Mamaluke). FBI successfully defended the titles against Unholy Alliance at Anarchy Rulz.

This was the final Heat Wave under the ECW banner, as the promotion would close its doors seven months later. Over 22 years later, the WWE, which purchased the assets of ECW in 2003, revived the Heat Wave event as a television special for the NXT brand division on August 16, 2022; Heatwave has since expanded to a livestreaming event.

== Results ==
No.	Results	Stipulations	Times
1	Sal E. Graziano (with Tony Mamaluke) defeated Balls Mahoney	Singles match	2:30
2	Kid Kash, Danny Doring and Roadkill defeated Simon Diamond, C. W. Anderson and Johnny Swinger	Six-man tag team match	11:01
3	Jerry Lynn defeated Steve Corino (with Jack Victory)	Singles match	15:23
4	Chris Chetti and Nova defeated Da Baldies (Tony DeVito and Angel)	Tag team match	5:00
5	Yoshihiro Tajiri defeated Mikey Whipwreck, Little Guido and Psicosis	Four-Way Dance	9:12
6	Rhino (c) defeated The Sandman	Singles match for the ECW World Television Championship	8:38
7	Rob Van Dam (with Bill Alfonso) defeated Scotty Anton	Singles match	19:02
8	Justin Credible (c) (with Francine) defeated Tommy Dreamer (with Jazz and George)	Stairway to Hell match for the ECW World Heavyweight Championship	12:20
(c) / – the champion(s) heading into the match

=== Four-Way Dance eliminations ===
Elimination no.	Wrestler	Eliminated by	Elimination move	Time
1	Mikey Whipwreck	Little Guido	Psycho Guillotine by Psicosis	1:36
2	Psicosis	Yoshihiro Tajiri	German suplex	4:28
3	Little Guido	Yoshihiro Tajiri	Brainbuster on a steel chair	9:17
Winner:	Yoshihiro Tajiri			

== See also ==
- 2000 in professional wrestling
