= CyberSlam (1998) =

1998 Extreme Championship Wrestling supercard event

- The ECW Arena.
- Promotion: Extreme Championship Wrestling
- Date: February 21, 1998
- City: Philadelphia, Pennsylvania
- Venue: ECW Arena
- Attendance: 2,000

Event chronology
← Previous; Hostile City Showdown	Next → It Ain't Seinfeld

CyberSlam chronology
← Previous; 1997	Next → 1999

CyberSlam (1998) was the third CyberSlam professional wrestling event produced by Extreme Championship Wrestling (ECW). The event took place on February 21, 1998, at the ECW Arena in Philadelphia, Pennsylvania.

Nine professional wrestling matches took place at the event. The main event was a tag team match, in which The Triple Threat's Shane Douglas and Bam Bam Bigelow defeated the team of Rob Van Dam and Sabu. On the undercard, The Hardcore Chair Swingin' Freaks (Axl Rotten and Balls Mahoney) and The Sandman took on the teams of Spike Dudley and The Gangstanators (Kronus and New Jack) and The Dudleys (Big Dick Dudley, Buh Buh Ray Dudley, and D-Von Dudley) in a Three-Way Dance, Justin Credible took on Tommy Dreamer in a First Blood match and Taz defended the World Television Championship against Brakkus.

== Storylines ==
The event featured wrestlers from pre-existing scripted feuds and storylines. Wrestlers portrayed villains, heroes, or less distinguishable characters in the scripted events that built tension and culminated in a wrestling match or series of matches played out on ECW's television program Hardcore TV.

At Hostile City Showdown, The Triple Threat (Shane Douglas, Chris Candido and Lance Storm) competed against Bam Bam Bigelow and Taz in a handicap match, which ended in a no contest when Bigelow turned on Taz while Candido turned on his World Tag Team Championship partner Storm and then Douglas reformed Triple Threat with Bigelow and Candido. In the following weeks, Candido berated Storm in his promos for trying to be in pursuit of his lady Tammy Lynn Sytch, which was the reason of Candido dumping Storm as his tag team partner. A match was made between Candido and Storm at CyberSlam on the February 18 episode of Hardcore TV.

On the January 7, 1998 episode of Hardcore TV, Brakkus defeated Paul Diamond and then Lance Wright threw down the WWF flag on Diamond. This brought out Taz, who confronted Team WWF and was warned by Judge Jeff Jones not to enter the ring but he attacked Jones and was about to fight Brakkus until Rob Van Dam and Sabu came in to attack Taz. At House Party, Taz successfully defended the World Television Championship against 2 Cold Scorpio. After the match, Wright and Brakkus attacked Scorpio until Taz made the save and cleared the ring of Brakkus. On the February 18 episode of Hardcore TV, it was announced that Taz would defend the title against Brakkus at CyberSlam.

At Hostile City Showdown, Justin Credible attacked Mikey Whipwreck during a four-way dance and called Tommy Dreamer to come and fight and then Dreamer left the match to brawl with Credible while his partner The Sandman ended up losing the match. On the February 18 episode of Hardcore TV, it was announced that Dreamer would face Credible in a first blood match at CyberSlam.

On the February 18 episode of Hardcore TV, it was announced that Rob Van Dam and Sabu would face the newly reformed Triple Threat members Bam Bam Bigelow and Shane Douglas in a tag team match at CyberSlam.

== Event ==
The event began with a ten-bell salute, given in remembrance of Louie Spicolli who had died from an accidental drug overdose six days earlier, on February 15, 1998.

=== Preliminary matches ===
Jerry Lynn competed against Danny Doring in the opening match of the show. Doring attempted a superplex from the top rope but Lynn countered it with a sunset flip powerbomb for the win.

Next, Al Snow took on The Full Blooded Italians member Tracy Smothers. The crowd threw millions of Snow's mannequin heads onto Smothers before the match began. The referee was knocked out and FBI ganged up on Snow and then biased referee Judge Jeff Jones came to substitute for the injured referee. Snow hit all of them with "Head" and then nailed Snow Plows on all the members of FBI and Jones and then Snow climbed the top rope, dived and hit Head in Smothers' groin for the win.

Next, Chris Chetti took on Doug Furnas. Chetti countered a bearhug by Furnas by hitting a DDT on Furnas and followed with a double jump moonsault on Furnas for the win.

After the match, The Triple Threat (Shane Douglas, Bam Bam Bigelow and Chris Candido) interrupted Joey Styles in the ring and hyped the tag team main event at Living Dangerously. Tammy Lynn Sytch did not reveal the name of Lance Storm's mystery tag team partner, resulting in Francine and Sytch getting into an argument and a brawl against each other. Lance Storm then came out for his match against Candido. Storm hit a superbomb for the win.

Next, Taz defended the World Television Championship against Brakkus. Brakkus overpowered Taz by using his strength and size. Droz brought a table into the ring and Brakkus set it up in the corner but Taz nailed a T-Bone Tazplex to Brakkus through the table. He escaped a military press slam by Brakkus and hit a German Tazplex and applied a Tazmission to retain the title.

This was followed by a First Blood match between Tommy Dreamer and Justin Credible. Dreamer wrapped barbed wire around himself and hit a frog splash to Credible. Rob Van Dam interfered in the match and hit a flying thrust kick to Dreamer while Dreamer had a trashcan in his hand. RVD made Dreamer bleed with the barbed wire and Credible nailed the trashcan into Dreamer's head. He then hit a That's Incredible to Beulah McGillicutty. Dreamer shoved barbed wire into Credible's mouth but the referee saw Dreamer bleed and awarded the win to Credible. After the match, Dreamer attacked Jason by choking him with the barbed wire.

The penultimate match was a six-man tag team match between The Hardcore Chair Swingin' Freaks (Axl Rotten and Balls Mahoney) and The Sandman and The Dudleys (Big Dick, Buh Buh Ray, and D-Von). Spike Dudley and The Gangstanators (Kronus and New Jack) interfered in the match and joined the match as the third team, continuing it as a three-way dance. After a back and forth match, Rotten executed a Severe Skull Trauma to Spike to eliminate him and Gangstanators. The match then resumed between the original two teams. Sandman hit a hotshot to Buh Buh to win the match.

=== Main event match ===
In the main event, Shane Douglas and Bam Bam Bigelow competed against Rob Van Dam and Sabu in a tag team match. After a back and forth match between the two teams, Bigelow nailed a Greetings From Asbury Park to RVD by catching a diving RVD in the mid-air and Douglas hit a belly-to-belly suplex, leading to Bigelow pinning RVD for the win.

== Reception ==
CyberSlam received mostly negative reviews from critics. Arnold Furious of Wrestling Recaps stated "Nothing spectacular and the long matches (apart from the main event) sucked." However, he praised the first blood match, the main event match and Lance Storm versus Chris Candido matches as the best three matches of the event. He reviewed on the first blood match "If not for anything else but Beulah getting tombstoned." He commented on the Storm/Candido match "I would have liked to have seen this feud go a little longer. They always entertained and it was the best feud Candido ever had (IMO). Psychologically strong and Storm lifted Candido’s finisher." According to him, the main event was "not the standard of excellence that Rob Van Dam had during most of his ECW run but still the best match on the card."

Scott Keith of 411Mania commented on the event "Nothing really worth seeing here for non-fans, and I’m sure fans already have it."

== Aftermath ==
At Living Dangerously, Chris Candido chose Shane Douglas as his tag team partner while Lance Storm revealed that Al Snow would be his mystery tag team partner. Snow pinned Douglas to earn himself a title shot at Douglas' ECW World Heavyweight Championship at Wrestlepalooza.

== Results ==
No.	Results	Stipulations	Times
1	Jerry Lynn defeated Danny Doring (with Roadkill)	Singles match	9:57
2	Al Snow defeated Tracy Smothers (with Little Guido and Tommy Rich)	Singles match	22:07
3	Chris Chetti defeated Doug Furnas	Singles match	4:07
4	Lance Storm defeated Chris Candido	Singles match	8:46
5	Taz (c) defeated Brakkus (with Droz and Lance Wright) via submission	Singles match for the ECW World Television Championship	2:37
6	Justin Credible (with Jason and Nicole Bass) defeated Tommy Dreamer	First Blood match	11:11
7	The Hardcore Chair Swingin' Freaks (Axl Rotten and Balls Mahoney) and The Sandman defeated Spike Dudley and The Gangstanators (Kronus and New Jack) and The Dudleys (Big Dick Dudley, Buh Buh Ray Dudley, and D-Von Dudley)	Three-Way Dance	18:25
8	Shane Douglas and Bam Bam Bigelow defeated Rob Van Dam and Sabu	Tag team match	23:10
(c) / – the champion(s) heading into the match

=== Three-Way Dance eliminations ===
Elimination no.	Wrestler	Team	Eliminated by	Elimination move	Time
1	Spike Dudley	Spike Dudley and The Gangstanators	Axl Rotten	Severe Skull Trauma	16:52
2	Buh Buh Ray Dudley	The Dudleys	The Sandman	Hotshot	18:25
Winners:	The Sandman and Hardcore Chair Swingin' Freaks				18:25
