= It Ain't Seinfeld =

1998 Extreme Championship Wrestling supercard event

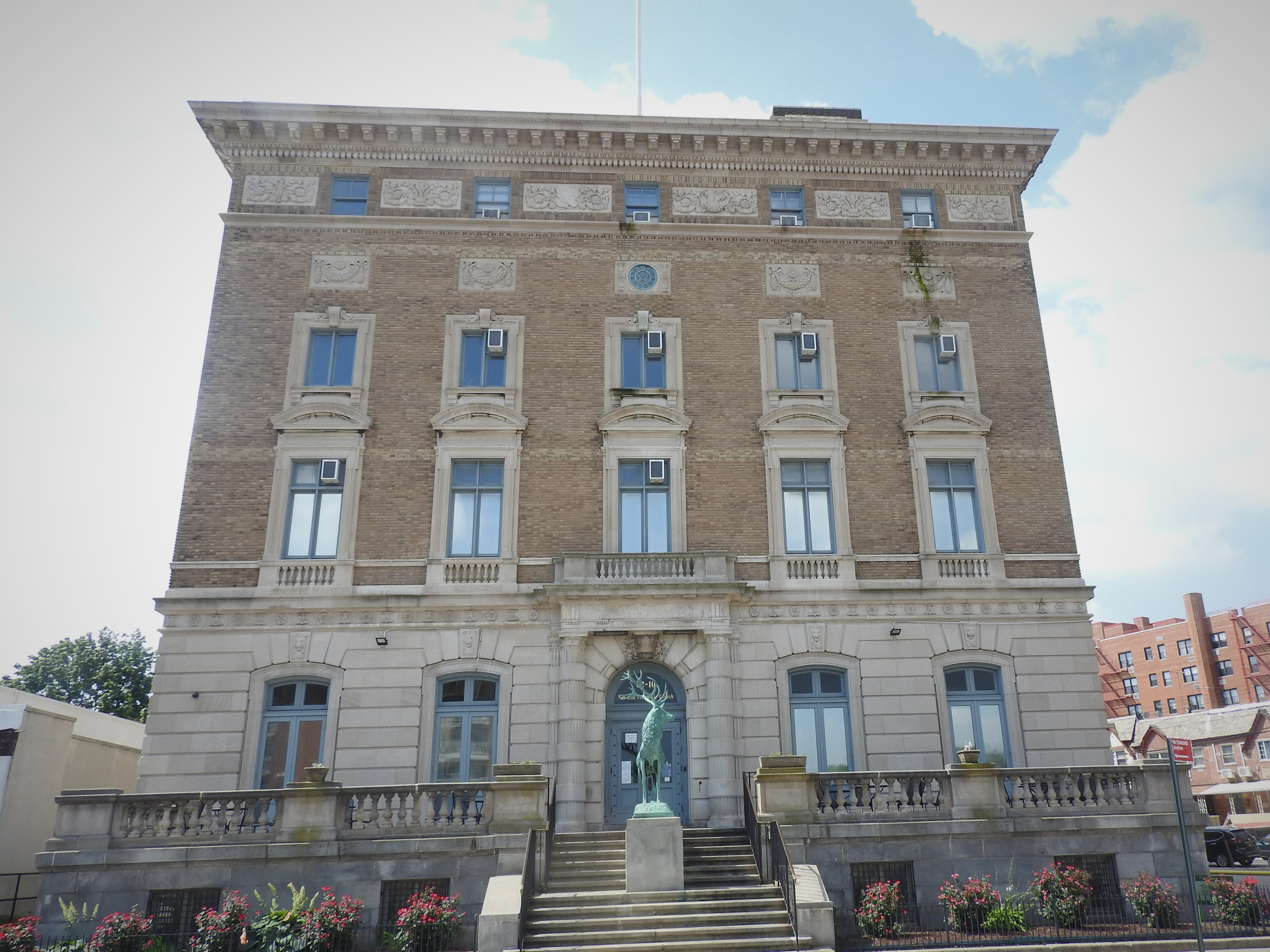
- Elks Lodge #878.
- Promotion: Extreme Championship Wrestling
- Date: May 14, 1998 (aired May 20, 1998)
- City: Elmhurst, Queens, New York City, New York, United States
- Venue: Elks Lodge #878
- Attendance: c. 1,000

Event chronology
← Previous; CyberSlam	Next → A Matter of Respect

It Ain't Seinfeld was a professional wrestling supercard event produced by Extreme Championship Wrestling (ECW). It took place on May 14, 1998, in the Elks Lodge #878 in Elmhurst, Queens, New York City, New York.

Eight matches took place at the event. The main event was a six-man tag team match pitting the Dudley Brothers (Buh Buh Ray, D-Von and Big Dick) against Tommy Dreamer, Spike Dudley and the Sandman. The event also saw the introduction of the ECW FTW Heavyweight Championship by Taz.

== Production ==
It Ain't Seinfield was held on the same evening that the final episode of the popular sitcom Seinfeld premiered on NBC, inspiring the naming of the event.

The commentator for the event was Joey Styles and the referee was John Finnegan.

Highlights of the event were shown in syndication on episode #265 of ECW Hardcore TV on May 20, 1998. The full event was released on VHS in 1998 and on DVD in 2002, with the cover art stylized after the Seinfeld logo.

Prior to the main event, Buh Buh Ray Dudley's heckling of the crowd resulted in a member of the audience attempting to enter the ring to attack him. The man was subdued by security guards before entering the ring.

== Background ==
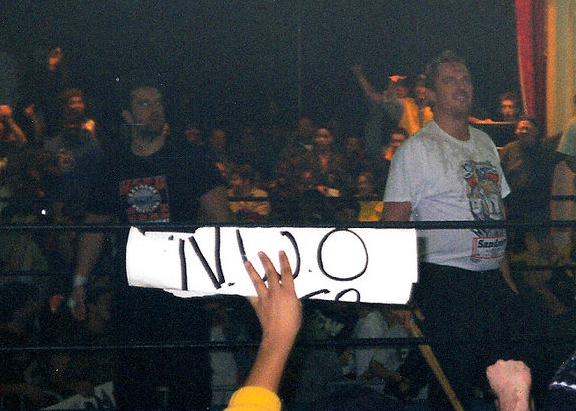
Tommy Dreamer (left) and the Sandman continued their feud with The Dudley Boyz at It Ain't Seinfeld.

It Ain't Seinfeld featured professional wrestling matches that involved different wrestlers from pre-existing scripted feuds and storylines. Wrestlers portrayed villains, heroes, or less distinguishable characters in the scripted events that built tension and culminated in a wrestling match or series of matches.

The event took place 10 days after Wrestlepalooza, where Tommy Dreamer and the Sandman defeated the Dudley Boyz (Buh Buh Ray Dudley and D-Von Dudley). Dreamer and The Sandman continued their feud with the Dudley Boyz at It Ain't Seinfeld.

Also at Wrestlepalooza, Rob Van Dam and Sabu continued their feud over the ECW World Television Championship, fighting to a time limit draw.

Prior to the event, Taz had been feuding with ECW World Heavyweight Champion Shane Douglas. After Douglas sustained an injury, Taz was unable to challenge him for the championship.

== Event ==
"And, hey, everybody knows that there's no way a fuck from Pittsburgh can beat up a man from Brooklyn. So what I got right here, I am the world champion, and I have the proof. You can call it the Brooklyn Title or the Fuck The World Belt!"

— Taz unveiling the FTW Heavyweight Championship at It Ain't Seinfeld

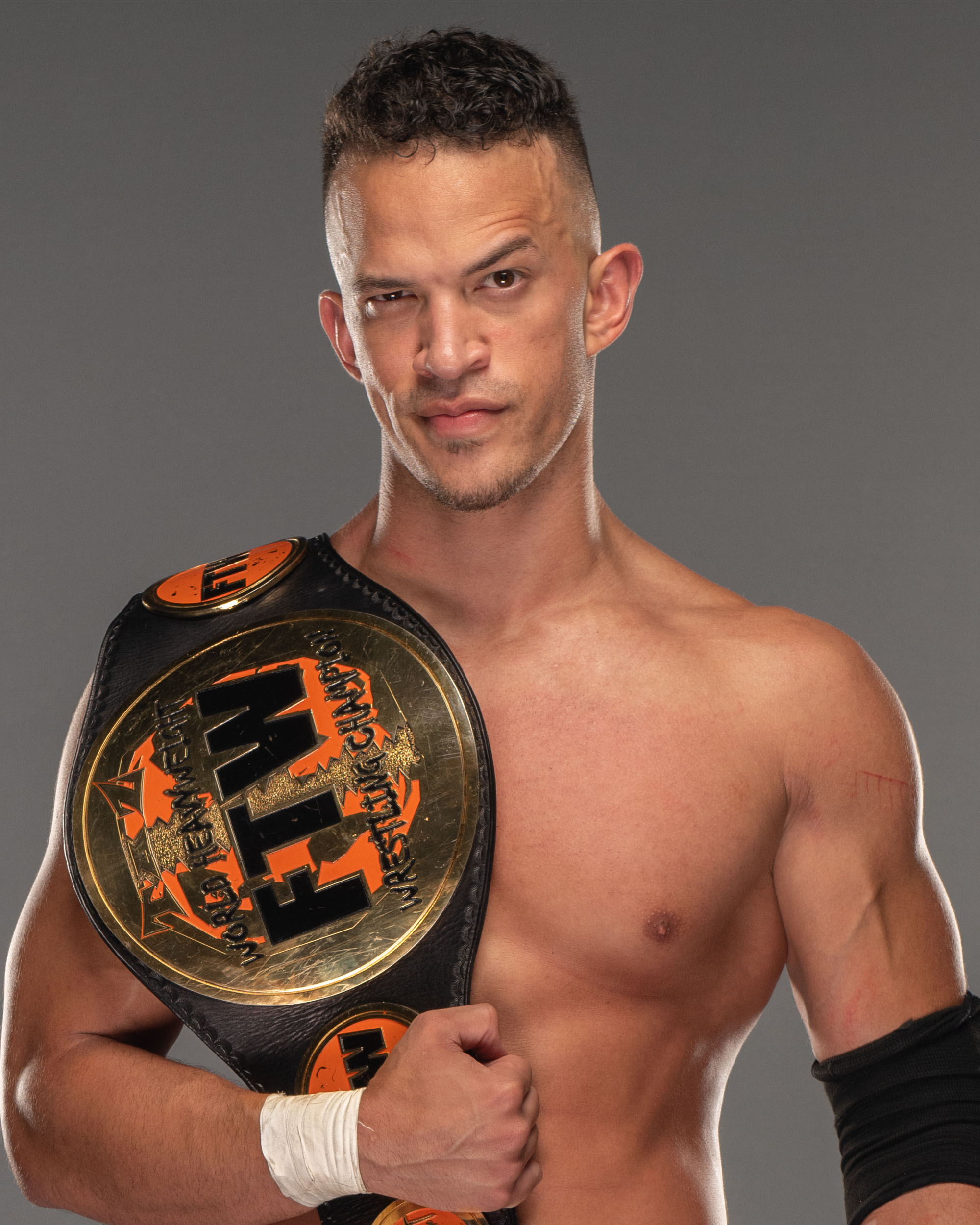
The FTW Heavyweight Championship was introduced at It Ain't Seinfeld, shown here as worn by Ricky Starks

It Ain't Seinfeld was attended by approximately 1,000 people.

The opening bout was a singles match between Jerry Lynn and Justin Credible. Lynn won the bout by pinfall after reversing Credible's That's Incredible move into his own That's Incredible, then pinning Credible.

The second bout was a singles match between Danny Doring and Sabu. Sabu won the match by submission using a camel clutch.

The third bout was a singles match between Chris Candido and Jamie Dundee. Candido won the bout by pinfall following a diving headbutt.

The fourth bout was a tag team match between the Blue World Order and the Full Blooded Italians. During the match, a disagreement arose between referees Jeff Jones and John Finnegan, culminating in Finnegan giving a DDT to Jones. The Blue World Order went on to win the match, with Super Nova pinning Little Guido following a Novacain.

The fifth bout was a singles match between Balls Mahoney and Lance Storm. Storm won the bout by pinfall after driving a chair into Mahoney's face using a springboard dropkick.

Following the fifth bout, Taz came to the ring and gave a promo in which he described himself as the uncrowned ECW World Heavyweight Champion. Taz then introduced his own championship – the ECW FTW Heavyweight Championship – and challenged ECW World Heavyweight Champion Shane Douglas to a title-versus-title match. After Taz's announcement, Douglas' ally Bam Bam Bigelow came to the ring and confronted Taz, telling him he would need to go through Bigelow to get to Douglas. After referees attempted to keep the two men apart, Bigelow press slammed one of the referees into the audience. Taz and Bigelow then brawled.

The sixth bout saw ECW World Television Champion Rob Van Dam defend his title against Mikey Whipwreck. The match ended in a no contest after Chris Candido and Sabu attacked Van Dam. After Lance Storm came to the ring to assist Van Dam, the four men brawled until being separated.

The seventh bout was a singles match between Axl Rotten and Bam Bam Bigelow. Bigelow won the bout by pinfall after performing Greetings from Asbury Park on Rotten.

The main event was a six-man tag team match pitting the Dudley Brothers against The Sandman, Spike Dudley, and Tommy Dreamer. The Dudley Brothers won the bout by pinfall when Big Dick Dudley pinned Spike Dudley after performing Total Penetration on him. Following the match, the Dudley Brothers beat down their opponents until New Jack came to the ring and helped drive them away.

== Results ==
No.	Results	Stipulations	Times
1	Jerry Lynn defeated Justin Credible (with Chastity and Jason) by pinfall	Singles match	10:13
2	Sabu (with Bill Alfonso) defeated Danny Doring by submission	Singles match	3:54
3	Chris Candido (with Francine) defeated Jamie Dundee by pinfall	Singles match	6:19
4	The Blue World Order (Super Nova and the Blue Meanie) defeated the Full Blooded Italians (Little Guido and Tracy Smothers) (with Tommy Rich) by pinfall	Tag team match	8:25
5	Lance Storm defeated Balls Mahoney by pinfall	Singles match	7:51
6	Rob Van Dam (c) (with Bill Alfonso) vs. Mikey Whipwreck ended in a no contest	Singles match for the ECW World Television Championship	10:46
7	Bam Bam Bigelow defeated Axl Rotten by pinfall	Singles match	1:23
8	The Dudley Brothers (Buh Buh Ray Dudley, D-Von Dudley and Big Dick Dudley) (with Joel Gertner and Sign Guy Dudley) defeated the Sandman, Spike Dudley and Tommy Dreamer (with Beulah McGillicutty) by pinfall	Six-man tag team match	23:24
(c) / – the champion(s) heading into the match

== Aftermath ==
Rob Van Dam and Sabu continued to feud. On June 29, 1998, their rivalry took an unusual turn when they were teamed together by their mutual manager, Bill Alfonso, against Chris Candido and Lance Storm, who they defeated to win the ECW World Tag Team Championship.

Tommy Dreamer, the Sandman and Spike Dudley continued their feud with the Dudley Brothers, defeating them in a street fight at Heat Wave on August 2, 1998.

With Shane Douglas injured, Taz began defending the FTW Heavyweight Championship. At Heat Wave, Taz defeated Bam Bam Bigelow – Douglas' stablemate in the Triple Threat – in a falls count anywhere match to retain the championship.
