= CyberSlam (1999) =

1999 Extreme Championship Wrestling supercard event

- The ECW Arena.
- Promotion: Extreme Championship Wrestling
- Date: April 3, 1999
- City: Philadelphia, Pennsylvania, US
- Venue: ECW Arena
- Attendance: 1,200

Event chronology
← Previous; Crossing the Line '99	Next → Hostile City Showdown

CyberSlam chronology
← Previous; 1998	Next → 2000

CyberSlam (1999) was the fourth CyberSlam professional wrestling event produced by Extreme Championship Wrestling (ECW). The event took place on April 3, 1999 in the ECW Arena in Philadelphia, Pennsylvania.

Eight professional wrestling matches took place at the event. The main event was an Ultimate Jeopardy match, in which former tag team partners from The Gangstas, New Jack and Mr. Mustafa competed in opposing teams. Jack teamed with The Hardcore Chair Swingin' Freaks (Axl Rotten and Balls Mahoney) and Mustafa teamed with The Dudley Boyz (Buh Buh Ray Dudley and D-Von Dudley). Mustafa and Dudleys won the match. On the undercard, Taz retained the ECW World Heavyweight Championship against Chris Candido and Rob Van Dam retained the ECW World Television Championship against 2 Cold Scorpio.

== Storylines ==
The event featured wrestlers from pre-existing scripted feuds and storylines. Wrestlers portrayed villains, heroes, or less distinguishable characters in the scripted events that built tension and culminated in a wrestling match or series of matches played out on ECW's television program Hardcore TV.

At Crossing the Line, Mustafa Saed made his surprise return to ECW on behalf of New Jack to confront The Dudley Boyz (Buh Buh Ray Dudley and D-Von Dudley) until he turned heel on Jack by smashing a guitar on his head and revealed himself to be the mysterious benefactor who wanted to run Public Enemy and New Jack out of ECW. Saed then allied himself with the Dudleys to feud with Jack. At Living Dangerously, Jack defeated Mustafa in a match.

At Living Dangerously, Tommy Dreamer and Shane Douglas defeated The Impact Players (Lance Storm and Justin Credible) in a tag team match. After the match, Cyrus the Virus made his ECW debut and distracted Dreamer and Douglas to allow Impact Players to attack them. On the April 2 episode of Hardcore TV, Credible helped Storm in defeating Dreamer in a match.

== Event ==
=== Preliminary matches ===
The event kicked off with a match between Jerry Lynn and Yoshihiro Tajiri. Lynn hit a cradle piledriver for the win. After the match, Lance Storm cut a promo in the ring to testify against Tommy Dreamer's claims that Storm took steroids and Storm brought a sample of urine to prove and challenged Dreamer to provide a sample of his urine test and Dreamer showed up to attack Storm with a DDT and poured the urine on Storm.

Next, Nova competed against Rod Price. Skull Von Crush interfered in the match by attacking Nova on behalf of Price and then Nova's tag team partner Chris Chetti also got involved, making it a tag team match. Nova and Chetti nailed a Tidal Wave to Price for the win. After the match, Crush attacked Price with a jumping DDT.

Next, Mosco de la Merced made his ECW debut against Super Crazy. Crazy hit a tilt-a-whirl backbreaker and a frog splash to Merced for the win.

In the following match, Taka Michinoku made his return to ECW against Papi Chulo, who made his ECW debut in the match. Michinoku nailed a Michinoku Driver 2-B to Chulo for the win.

Next, Rob Van Dam defended the World Television Championship against 2 Cold Scorpio, who made his surprise return to ECW. Sabu interfered in the match and hit an Arabian Facebuster to Scorpio through a table outside the ring. After a back and forth action, Scorpio seemed to have the match won as he climbed the top rope for a Scorpio Splash but Bill Alfonso crotched him on the ropes and held a chair, allowing RVD to hit a Van Daminator and a Five Star Frog Splash to retain the title.

Later, Chris Candido returned to ECW and cut a promo, in which he issued a challenge to Taz to a Falls Count Anywhere match for the World Heavyweight Championship, which Taz accepted. After brawling throughout the ringside, Taz nailed a Tazmission-Plex to Candido through a table which injured Candido's neck and the referee stopped the match, awarding the win to Taz. After the match, Candido was being carried away to the backstage on a stretcher but Tazz dragged him and tossed him into the ring and applied a Tazmission.

In the penultimate match, Shane Douglas took on Justin Credible. Douglas tripped Credible from the top rope and delivered a Pittsburgh Plunge for the win. After the match, Lance Storm joined Credible in attacking Douglas with a kendo stick. Tommy Dreamer attempted to make the save but he was also attacked with the kendo stick.

=== Main event match ===
New Jack and The Hardcore Chair Swingin' Freaks (Axl Rotten and Balls Mahoney) took on The Dudley Boyz (Buh Buh Ray Dudley and D-Von Dudley) and Mr. Mustafa in an Ultimate Jeopardy match. Mahoney shot a fireball into Mustafa's face but it distracted him enough for Dudleys to nail a 3D to Mahoney for the win. After the match, Rotten and Mahoney locked Mustafa in the cage and laid him on a table and Jack hit a diving splash to Mustafa from the top of the cage onto the table.

== Reception ==
Bob Colling of Wrestling Recaps wrote "This is a really good show. I’d say six out of the eight matches had entertaining qualities. The show had fast paced contests and a good battle between Douglas/Credible. Also, the segment with Storm and Dreamer was nicely done and advances their feud. This is probably one of the better ECW shows I’ve ever watched and it only took me almost thirteen years to watch. Cyber slam ‘99 gets a thumbs up from me."

The Wrestling Revolution staff praised the event, writing "This was a very good show from ECW. We got solid action all up and down the card, some big angles in both the Dreamer vs. Storm and Taz vs. Candido feuds, and a big blow-off in the main event."

Peter Kent of 411Mania rated it a score of 3, stating "This is certainly not an essential show, with no real standout matches. Mostly filler fodder. But Douglas vs Credible was much better than expected and Tajiri/Lynn was really cool"

James Bullock of Capricorn City wrote "There’s some good stuff here, that’s for sure. But nothing here is must-see. The crowd truly did take something away from this show, but you can’t blame them for becoming desensitized. Check it out if you want to, but don’t get your hopes up about seeing something special."

== Aftermath ==
The matches of the event aired in syndication on the April 8, April 15 and April 22 episodes of Hardcore TV.

Shane Douglas and Tommy Dreamer continued their feud with The Impact Players (Lance Storm and Justin Credible) after CyberSlam. On the April 29 episode of Hardcore TV, Dreamer defeated Lance Storm in a match. After the match, Storm and Credible double teamed Dreamer until Douglas made the save but he was attacked as well. Douglas would then suffer a broken ankle, which put him out of action and led to his departure from ECW. Dreamer wrestled Storm at Hardcore Heaven.

== Results ==
No.	Results	Stipulations	Times
1	Jerry Lynn defeated Yoshihiro Tajiri	Singles match	8:52
2	Chris Chetti and Nova defeated Rod Price and Skull Von Crush	Tag team match	4:22
3	Super Crazy defeated Mosco de la Merced	Singles match	9:51
4	Taka Michinoku defeated Papi Chulo	Singles match	6:42
5	Rob Van Dam (c) (with Bill Alfonso) defeated 2 Cold Scorpio	Singles match for the ECW World Television Championship	16:42
6	Taz (c) defeated Chris Candido (with Tammy Lynn Sytch) by submission	Falls Count Anywhere match for the ECW World Heavyweight Championship	11:46
7	Shane Douglas (with Francine) defeated Justin Credible (with Jason and Jazz)	Singles match	14:50
8	The Dudley Boyz (Buh Buh Ray Dudley and D-Von Dudley) and Mr. Mustafa defeated New Jack and The Hardcore Chair Swingin' Freaks (Axl Rotten and Balls Mahoney)	Ultimate Jeopardy match	14:23
(c) / – the champion(s) heading into the match
