= ACW Hardcore Championship =

Professional wrestling championship

Details
- Promotion: Assault Championship Wrestling
- Date established: August 24, 2001
- Date retired: March 21, 2004
Statistics
- First champion: Ron Zombie
- Most reigns: Ron Zombie (4 reigns)
- Longest reign: Jamie Pain (196 days)
- Shortest reign: Ron Zombie (<1 day); Mike E. Milano (<1 day)

The ACW Hardcore Championship was the top professional wrestling hardcore championship title in the American independent promotion Assault Championship Wrestling. Ron Zombie was declared the first-ever champion in Meriden, Connecticut on August 24, 2001. The championship was regularly defended throughout the state of Connecticut until the promotion closed in early-2004.

Ron Zombie holds the record for most reigns as a 4-time champion. At 196 days, The Mutilators' (Jamie Pain and Nemesis) reign is the longest in the title's history. Ron Zombie and Mike E. Milano, both losing the title at the same show in which they had won it, share the record for the shortest reigns. Overall, there have been 12 reigns shared between 10 wrestlers, with no vacancies.

== Title history ==
| # | Order in reign history |
| Reign | The reign number for the specific set of wrestlers listed |
| Event | The event in which the title was won |
| — | Used for vacated reigns so as not to count it as an official reign |
| N/A | The information is not available or is unknown |
| + | Indicates the current reign is changing daily |

=== Reigns ===
| # | Wrestlers | Reign | Date | Days held | Location | Event | Notes | Ref. |
|---|---|---|---|---|---|---|---|---|
| 1 | Ron Zombie | 1 | August 24, 2001 | <0 | Meriden, Connecticut | Live event | Declared the first ACW Hardcore Champion. | |
| 2 | Balls Mahoney | 1 | August 24, 2001 | 22 | Meriden, Connecticut | Live event | | |
| 3 | Ron Zombie | 2 | September 15, 2001 | 104 | Meriden, Connecticut | Live event | | |
| 4 | Wrecka | 1 | December 28, 2001 | 29 | Meriden, Connecticut | Live event | This was at an LIWF show. | |
| 5 | Bull Dredd | 1 | January 26, 2002 | 97 | Meriden, Connecticut | Live event | Won the title in a 10-man tag team match with Jason Knight, Balls Mahoney, Fred Curry Jr., and Ron Zombie against Wrecka, Homicide, Low Life Louie, Nick Richards, and Purty Kurty Adonis. | |
| 6 | Danny Doring | 1 | May 3, 2002 | 79 | Meriden, Connecticut | Live event | | |
| 7 | Ron Zombie | 3 | July 21, 2002 | 105 | Waterbury, Connecticut | Live event | | |
| 8 | Mike E. Milano | 1 | November 3, 2002 | <0 | New Britain, Connecticut | Live event | | |
| 9 | Jeff Rocker | 1 | November 3, 2002 | 182 | New Britain, Connecticut | Live event | Awarded title as a result of The Prowlers defeating Ron Zombie and Jason Knight in a tag team match. | |
| 10 | Ron Zombie | 4 | May 4, 2003 | 120 | Waterbury, Connecticut | Live event | With Jason Knight defeated The Prowlers, who were defending the title on Milano's behalf, in a tag team match. | |
| 11 | Jamie Pain/Nemesis (co-holders) | 1 | September 7, 2003 | 196 | Waterbury, Connecticut | Live event | | |
| 12 | Avil Graves | 1 | March 21, 2004 | — | New Britain, Connecticut | Live event | ACW holds its last show on March 21, 2004. | |

== Combined reigns ==
| Rank | Wrestlers | Reign | Combined days |
|---|---|---|---|
| 1 | Ron Zombie | 4 | 329 |
| 2 | Jamie Pain/Nemesis (co-holders) | 1 | 196 |
| 3 | Jeff Rocker | 1 | 182 |
| 4 | Bull Dredd | 1 | 97 |
| 5 | Danny Doring | 1 | 79 |
| 6 | Wrecka | 1 | 29 |
| 7 | Balls Mahoney | 1 | 22 |
| 8 | Avil Graves | 1 | <1 |
| 8 | Mike E. Milano | 1 | <1 |
