= CyberSlam (1997) =

1997 Extreme Championship Wrestling supercard event

- Promotion: Extreme Championship Wrestling
- Date: Night 1: February 21, 1997; Night 2: February 22, 1997
- City: Night 1: Queens, New York; Night 2: Philadelphia, Pennsylvania
- Venue: Night 1: Lost Battalion Hall; Night 2: ECW Arena
- Attendance: Night 1: 800; Night 2: 1,400; Combined: 2,800

Event chronology
← Previous; Crossing the Line Again	Next → Mountain Top Madness

CyberSlam chronology
← Previous; 1996	Next → 1998

CyberSlam (1997) was the second CyberSlam professional wrestling event produced by Extreme Championship Wrestling (ECW). The event was held on two nights on February 21 and February 22. The first CyberSlam show was held on February 21, 1997 in Lost Battalion Hall, Queens, New York and the second show was held on February 22, 1997 at the ECW Arena in Philadelphia, Pennsylvania.

The Eliminators versus Sabu and Rob Van Dam was included on the 2012 WWE DVD and Blu-ray release ECW Unreleased: Vol 1.

== Storylines ==
The event featured wrestlers from pre-existing scripted feuds and storylines. Wrestlers portrayed villains, heroes, or less distinguishable characters in the scripted events that built tension and culminated in a wrestling match or series of matches played out on ECW's television program Hardcore TV.

At Crossing the Line Again, Terry Funk defeated Tommy Rich. After his win, Funk declared his intention of challenging Raven for the World Heavyweight Championship. On the February 20 episode of Hardcore TV, Raven mocked Funk and Tommy Dreamer in his promo. It was announced that Funk and Dreamer would be facing Raven and Brian Lee at the CyberSlam tour.

The Sandman defeated D-Von Dudley in a match at Crossing the Line Again. D-Von caned Sandman after the match until his estranged brothers Buh Buh Ray Dudley and Spike Dudley apparently came to make the save until Buh Buh turned heel by attacking Sandman. Spike objected to it but was hit with a 3D, which led to Buh Buh and D-Von forming a tag team The Dudley Boyz. This set up a match between Buh Buh and Spike at CyberSlam.

At Crossing the Line Again, The Eliminators defeated Rob Van Dam and Sabu in the main event to retain the World Tag Team Championship, This would lead to title matches between the two teams at CyberSlam. An additional match for Sabu was announced against Chris Candido for CyberSlam on the February 20 episode of Hardcore TV.

== Event ==
=== Night 1 ===
The show kicked off with a match between Chris Chetti and Balls Mahoney. Mahoney hit a powerslam and a diving elbow drop from the second rope to win the match.

Next, The Pitbulls (Pitbull #1 and Pitbull #2) took on The Triple Threat members Brian Lee and Chris Candido. Shane Douglas was initially scheduled to compete but pulled a groin muscle due to having fun with Francine. Douglas interfered in the match but was knocked down. Pitbull #1 powerbombed Candido but Lee hit him with a crutch for the win.

Next, Spike Dudley took on Buh Buh Ray Dudley. Axl Rotten shoved off Spike from the top rope into the mid-air where Buh Buh caught him with a Bubba Cutter for the win.

Later, The Sandman and Tommy Dreamer competed against Raven and Stevie Richards in a tag team match. Dissension took place between Raven and Richards when Richards missed a flying forearm smash on Dreamer, who ducked it and accidentally hit it to Raven on the apron, sending him into the railing outside the ring. After Raven recovered, Richards tried to make a tag but Raven dropped down on the floor. After preventing a tag again, Raven finally made the tag and Richards nailed Stevie Kicks to Sandman and Dreamer and then turned on Raven by hitting him with a Stevie Kick and walked out on the match, leaving Raven alone. Raven low blowed Sandman and Dreamer but received a back body drop and Dreamer nailed a DDT to Raven, allowing Sandman to pin him for the victory. After the match, Brian Lee attacked Sandman and Dreamer until Terry Funk made the save.

The Gangstas (New Jack and Mustafa) took on the team of Axl Rotten and D-Von Dudley in the following match. Jack hit a 187 to Rotten for the win. After the match, The Dudley Boyz attacked Gangstas.

In the penultimate match, Taz took on Little Guido. Taz dominated the match and applied a Tazmission to make Guido submit to the move.

The main event was a Tables and Ladders match, in which The Eliminators (Perry Saturn and John Kronus) defended the World Tag Team Championship against Sabu and Rob Van Dam. After a back and forth action, Eliminators nailed a Total Elimination to RVD to retain the titles.

=== Night 2 ===
The opening match was a rematch from the previous night, in which The Eliminators defended the World Tag Team Championship against Sabu and Rob Van Dam in a Tables and Ladders match. Eliminators executed two Total Eliminations on RVD to retain the titles. After the match, Sabu embraced both members by shaking hands with them but RVD refused to show respect. After the match, Joey Styles conducted an interview with The Pitbulls, in which Pitbull #1 berated Shane Douglas. Douglas and Francine arrived at the ramp where he confronted them and challenged them to a fight and Pitbulls went to charge at him but were tricked by Douglas into being attacked by Triple Threat. Brian Lee executed a Primetime Slam to Pitbull #2 through a table and Chris Candido choked Pitbull #1 with a dog chain.

Next, Chris Chetti took on Little Guido. Guido missed a diving knee drop on Chetti, who quickly pinned Guido with an inside cradle for the win.

Next, Balls Mahoney took on The Blue World Order member Big Stevie Cool. Mahoney attempted to execute a Powerbomb on Stevie but he jumped from the back and hit a Stevie Kick for the win.

Later, Spike Dudley took on Axl Rotten. Dudley avoided a bulldog and hit an Acid Drop on Rotten until Dudley Boyz attacked Spike, allowing Rotten to hit a powerbomb for the win. After the match, Dudley Boyz hit a 3D to Spike until The Gangstas made the save and competed against Dudley Boyz to begin the next match. Jack knocked Rotten from the apron with a steel chair and then climbed the top rope and attempted a 187 but Buh Buh Ray Dudley caught him with a Bubba Cutter for the win.

Next, Tracy Smothers made his ECW debut against Taz. Taz dominated Smothers by executing a T-Bone Tazplex and applied a Tazmission to make him submit.

In the penultimate match, Raven and Brian Lee competed against the team of Tommy Dreamer and Terry Funk. The match stipulated that Funk would earn a title shot at Raven's World Heavyweight Championship at Barely Legal should he beat Raven. Funk initially made Raven submit to a spinning toe hold but the referee was distracted in ejecting Lee and Dreamer, so he could not see it and then Lee hit a trashcan to Funk to break the hold. Lee injured Funk by repeatedly hitting him in the face with a trashcan, thus making him bleed and Funk was removed from the match by the medical staff. Stevie Richards showed up along with Lori Fullington and Tyler Fullington and Raven distracted him enough for Brian Lee to hit a Primetime Slam. Raven then nailed an Evenflow to Lori and then Dreamer came back to the ring and charged at Raven but Lee nailed a Primetime Slam to Dreamer. Tyler came back with his father, The Sandman, who substituted for Funk and caned Lee and Raven multiple times and then hit an Evenflow to Raven and pinned him for the win.

In the main event, Sabu competed against Chris Candido. Candido attempted a diving headbutt but Sabu blocked it with a chair to Candido's face and nailed a triple jump leg drop to win the match.

== Reception ==
Reviewing on the February 21 show, Bob Colling of Wrestling Recaps wrote "An average show for ECW, but there wasn’t overly awful on the show. The Gangstas stuff was just the usual from them and has its place on the show since it is over with the crowd. The main event delivered a fine bout and the tag match involving Raven, Richards, Sandman and Dreamer was good in advancing an angle. There’s just nothing that makes the show memorable or must-see."

Wrestling 20 Years Ago staff rated the event 7 out of 10, writing "Sabu/Van Dam vs The Eliminators, the Pitbulls angle, The Dudleys/The Gangstas and the main event are all good or noteworthy."

== Aftermath ==
Terry Funk would become the number one contender for Raven's World Heavyweight Championship and began feuding with Raven over the title. Funk defeated Raven to win the title at ECW's first-ever pay-per-view event Barely Legal.

Shane Douglas and Triple Threat continued their feud with The Pitbulls. At Barely Legal, Douglas defeated Pitbull #2 to retain the ECW World Television Championship.

Chris Chetti and Little Guido continued their rivalry as Chetti teamed with Tracy Smothers to compete against Guido and Tommy Rich at Hostile City Showdown, where Smothers turned on Chetti to cost him the match and joined Full Blooded Italians.

== Results ==
February 21, 1997 – Lost Battalion Hall in Queens, New York

No.	Results	Stipulations	Times
1	Balls Mahoney defeated Chris Chetti	Singles match	5:58
2	Brian Lee and Chris Candido defeated The Pitbulls (Pitbull #1 and Pitbull #2)	Tag team match	10:20
3	Buh Buh Ray Dudley defeated Spike Dudley	Singles match	10:43
4	The Sandman and Tommy Dreamer defeated Raven and Stevie Richards	Tag team match	14:15
5	The Gangstas (New Jack and Mustafa) defeated Axl Rotten and D-Von Dudley	Tag team match	13:14
6	Taz defeated Little Guido by submission	Singles match	4:04
7	The Eliminators (Saturn and Kronus) (c) defeated Sabu and Rob Van Dam	Tables and Ladders match for the ECW World Tag Team Championship	21:15
(c) / – the champion(s) heading into the match

February 22, 1997 – ECW Arena in Philadelphia, Pennsylvania

No.	Results	Stipulations	Times
1	The Eliminators (Saturn and Kronus) (c) defeated Sabu and Rob Van Dam	Tables and Ladders match for the ECW World Tag Team Championship	20:40
2	Chris Chetti defeated Little Guido (with Tommy Rich)	Singles match	5:46
3	Big Stevie Cool (with The Blue Meanie and Hollywood Nova) defeated Balls Mahoney	Singles match	12:26
4	Axl Rotten defeated Spike Dudley	Singles match	4:06
5	The Dudley Boyz (Buh Buh Ray Dudley and D-Von Dudley) defeated The Gangstas (New Jack and Mustafa)	Tag team match	14:22
6	Taz defeated Tracy Smothers via submission	Singles match	3:21
7	Terry Funk and Tommy Dreamer defeated Raven and Brian Lee	Tag team match	18:53
8	Sabu defeated Chris Candido	Singles match	18:26
(c) / – the champion(s) heading into the match
