= Crossing the Line Again =

1997 Extreme Championship Wrestling supercard event

- The ECW Arena.
- Promotion: Extreme Championship Wrestling
- Date: February 1, 1997 (aired February 6 and 13, 1997)
- City: Philadelphia, Pennsylvania, United States
- Venue: ECW Arena
- Attendance: 1,400

Event chronology
← Previous; House Party	Next → CyberSlam

Crossing the Line Again was a professional wrestling event held by the Philadelphia, Pennsylvania, United States–based professional wrestling promotion Extreme Championship Wrestling (ECW) on February 1, 1997. The commentator for the event was Joey Styles. The title of the event referenced the 1994 ECW event The Night the Line Was Crossed.

Crossing the Line Again saw the debut of Lance Storm in ECW, along with the creation of the tag team the Dudley Boyz, and "Dr Death" Steve Williams sustaining his first defeat in the United States in over 10 years. Several matches from Crossing the Line Again were broadcast on episodes No. 198 and No. 199 of ECW Hardcore TV on February 6 and 13, 1997. The full event was released on VHS and DVD in 2002. The bout between the Eliminators and Rob Van Dam and Sabu was included in the 2005 compilation DVD Rob Van Dam – One of a Kind.

== Background ==
Crossing the Line Again featured professional wrestling matches that involved different wrestlers from pre-existing scripted feuds and storylines. Wrestlers portrayed villains, heroes, or less distinguishable characters in the scripted events that built tension and culminated in a wrestling match or series of matches.

== Event ==
The event began with ECW owner Paul E. Dangerously giving a speech in which he announced ECW would stage ECW Barely Legal, its first pay-per-view event, in April 1997.

The opening match, which was not included on video and DVD releases, pitted Louie Spicolli against Mike Awesome.

In the second bout of the night, Balls Mahoney faced Lance Storm, who was making his ECW debut. After Mahoney missed a diving elbow drop, Storm delivered a spinning heel kick from the top rope and scored a pinfall victory.

The third match saw Big Stevie Cool (accompanied by the Blue World Order) defeat Ricky Morton (accompanied by his girlfriend, Austen) by pinfall in a one-sided match after delivering a "Stevie Kick".

Another squash match followed, with "Dr Death" Steve Williams pinning Axl Rotten in under two minutes using his signature backdrop driver.

After defeating Rotten, Williams gave an impromptu interview in which he declared that he wanted the ECW World Heavyweight Championship. This drew out ECW World Heavyweight Championship Raven. As the two men brawled, commissioner Tod Gordon declared that this was to be a title match. During the match, Big Stevie Cool interfered, attacking Raven. After Williams rejected Big Stevie Cool's offer of a Blue World Order T-shirt, Big Stevie Cool gave Williams three consecutive "Stevie Kicks", enabling Raven to rally and deliver an "Evenflow DDT" for the pin. The defeat marked Williams' first loss in the United States in over a decade.

The sixth match of the evening pitted D-Von Dudley against The Sandman. A short, violent bout ended when a bloodied Sandman pinned Dudley after a diving leg drop onto a steel chair he placed on Dudley's face. Following the match, D-Von Dudley stole The Sandman's Singapore cane and used it to beat him down. D-Von's estranged brothers Buh Buh Ray Dudley and Spike Dudley came to the ring to stop the attack, but Buh Buh Ray Dudley turned heel by siding with D-Von and joining in the attack. After Spike attempted to stop the attack, the newly-formed Dudley Boyz executed the first-ever "Dudley Death Drop" on him. The Gangstas then charged the ring, but were also beaten down by the Dudley Boyz.

The first tag team match of the night saw The Eliminators defend their ECW World Tag Team Championship against Rob Van Dam and Sabu. A lengthy bout ended after Van Dam received Total Elimination. Following the match, Taz came to the ring to confront Sabu, goading him to agree to face him at Barely Legal|.

The penultimate match saw Terry Funk defeat Tommy Rich by submission using his signature spinning toe hold.

In the main event, the Pitbulls and Tommy Dreamer joined forces against the Triple Threat (Brian Lee, Chris Candido, and Shane Douglas). The match ended when Dreamer and Pitbull #2 superbombed Pitbull #1 through a table on which Douglas was lying. Candido's former valet from his World Wrestling Federation days, Kloudi, attempted to interfere on his behalf during the match, but was chased away by Dreamer's girlfriend Beulah McGillicutty. The Pitbulls and Dreamer were assisted by an unnamed masked man who distracted The Triple Threat and prevented their valet Francine from interfering.

== Aftermath ==
After joining forces at Crossing the Line Again, Buh Buh Ray Dudley and D-Von Dudley wrestled for much of the following 19 years as the Dudley Boyz. They became a dominant tag team, winning the ECW World Tag Team Championship, IWGP Tag Team Championship, NWA World Tag Team Championship, TNA World Tag Team Championship, WCW World Tag Team Championship, WWE Raw Tag Team Championship, and WWF World Tag Team Championship tag team championships before disbanding in December 2016.

== Results ==
No.	Results	Stipulations	Times
1	Louie Spicolli defeated Mike Awesome	Singles match	—
2	Lance Storm defeated Balls Mahoney by pinfall	Singles match	5:32
3	Big Stevie Cool (with 7-11, Da Blue Guy, and Hollywood Nova) defeated Ricky Morton (with Austen) by pinfall	Singles match	5:22
4	"Dr. Death" Steve Williams defeated Axl Rotten by pinfall	Singles match	1:52
5	Raven (c) defeated "Dr. Death" Steve Williams by pinfall	Singles match for the ECW World Heavyweight Championship	8:27
6	The Sandman defeated D-Von Dudley by pinfall	Singles match	5:33
7	The Eliminators (Kronus and Saturn) (c) defeated Rob Van Dam and Sabu by pinfall	Tag team match for the ECW World Tag Team Championship	20:02
8	Terry Funk defeated Tommy Rich by submission	Singles match	10:45
9	The Pitbulls (Pitbull #1 and Pitbull #2) and Tommy Dreamer defeated The Triple Threat (Brian Lee, Chris Candido, and Shane Douglas) (with Francine) by pinfall	Six man tag team match	16:22
(c) / – the champion(s) heading into the match
