= Justin Credible =

American wrestler (born 1973)

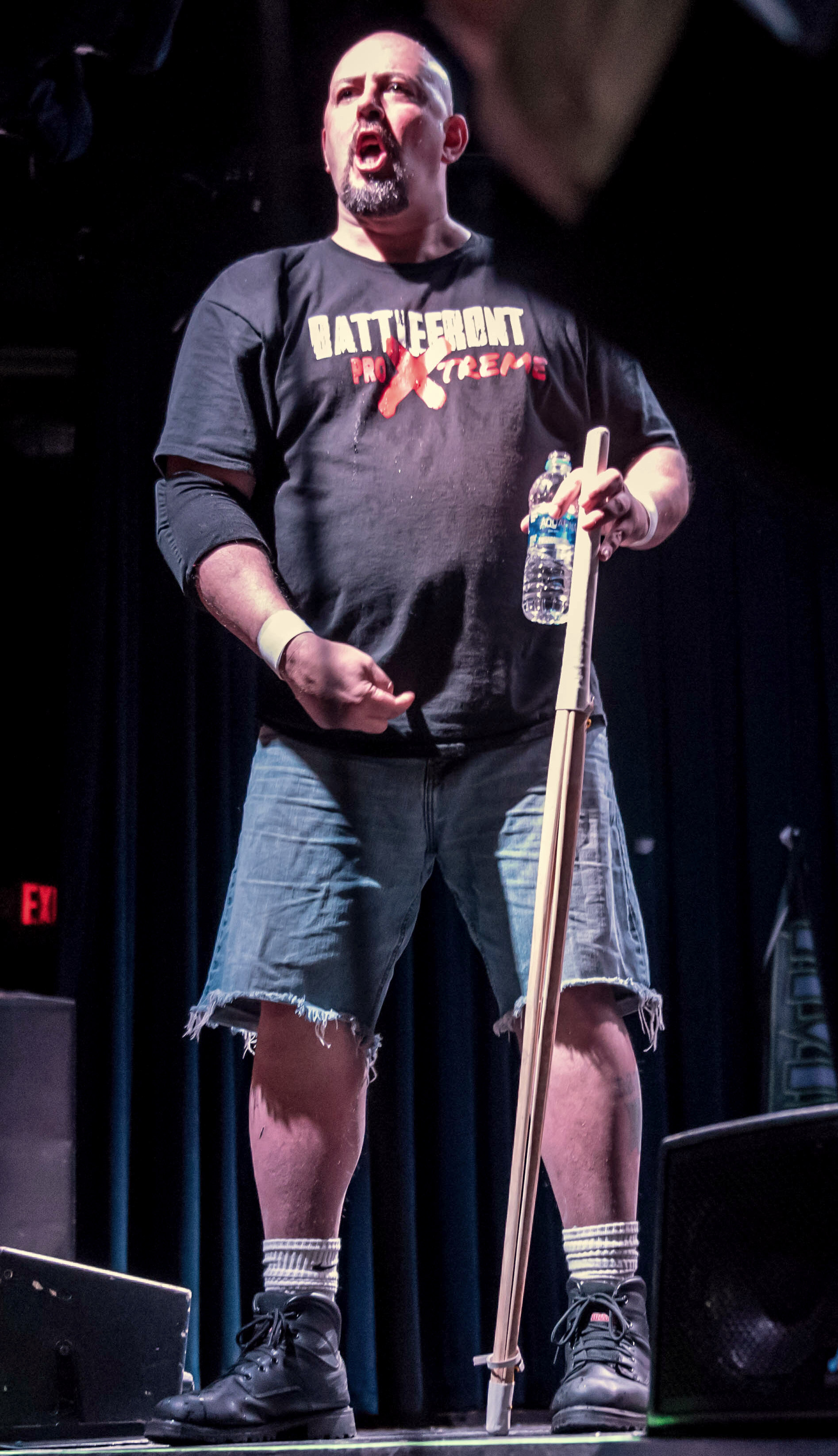
- Credible in 2019

Personal information
- Born: Peter Joseph Polaco; October 16, 1973 (age 53) Waterbury, Connecticut, U.S.
- Spouse: Jill Jurecki (m. 1997; div. 2003)
- Children: 3

Professional wrestling career
- Ring name(s): Aldo Montoya; Justin Credible; Justin Time; Man O' War; PG-187; P. G. Walker; P. J. Polaco; P. J. Walker
- Billed height: 6 ft 0 in (183 cm)
- Billed weight: 225 lb (102 kg)
- Billed from: Ozone Park, New York; Lousã, Portugal (as Aldo Montoya)
- Trained by: Keith Hart; Lance Storm
- Debut: October 16, 1992

Peter Joseph Polaco (born October 16, 1973) is an American professional wrestler. He is best known for his appearances with Extreme Championship Wrestling (ECW) and the World Wrestling Federation (WWF) under the ring name Justin Credible.

Debuting in 1992, Polaco first came to prominence in 1994 when he debuted in the WWF as Aldo Montoya. After leaving the WWF in 1997, he joined ECW and adopted the ring name "Justin Credible". He formed the Impact Players tag team with Lance Storm in 1999 and the duo won the ECW World Tag Team Championship twice in 2000. Later that year, he won the ECW World Heavyweight Championship at CyberSlam and held it for five months. He remained in the title contention until ECW folded in 2001 and competed in the last match of ECW. He then returned to WWF as a member of X-Factor and later The Alliance during the Invasion angle. He later won the Hardcore Championship eight times before departing in 2003. He briefly returned to the renamed WWE in 2006 as part of the revived ECW brand.

== Professional wrestling career ==
=== Early career (1992–1994) ===
Polaco traveled to Calgary, Alberta in 1992 to train at the Hart Brothers Training Camp, nominally run by Keith Hart. He was mainly trained by his future tag team partner, Lance Storm, and Chris Jericho, who both graduated the program the year before. After wrestling unpaid as P. J. Walker, and setting up the rings there for a time, he began working for New England–based wrestling promotions.

In 1994, he also worked a few matches as an enhancement talent in World Championship Wrestling (WCW).

=== World Wrestling Federation (1993, 1994–1997) ===
He began wrestling for the World Wrestling Federation (WWF) as an enhancement talent. His first match was a loss to Lex Luger on the March 1, 1993, episode of Monday Night Raw. He continued to wrestle sporadically in the WWF throughout 1993 and 1994 losing to Yokozuna, Bam Bam Bigelow, Mr. Perfect, Diesel, Jeff Jarrett, Owen Hart, Undertaker and Nikolai Volkoff. He even scored an upset victory against Irwin R. Schyster on the September 20, 1993, episode of Raw, after a distraction by Razor Ramon.

In November 1994, Polaco was hired by Pat Patterson to a full-time contract in the WWF. His Portuguese ancestry inspired the WWF to give him the soccer player character of Aldo Montoya. However the idea changed to the "Portuguese Man O' War" character since he didn't like soccer. He made his televised debut as a fan favorite on the November 14 episode of Monday Night Raw, where he picked up a victory over The Brooklyn Brawler. He was once offered to be a part of the Million Dollar Corporation by Ted DiBiase. He refused and told him to "shove his money in his ear". His mask drew criticism by fellow wrestlers, who called it a "jockstrap". Polaco befriended The Kliq, an influential group of upper card wrestlers, after Razor Ramon offered to mentor him. Polaco made his pay-per-view debut at the 1995 Royal Rumble as a participant in the Royal Rumble match. He lasted 13 minutes until he was eliminated by eventual winner Shawn Michaels. Montoya suffered his first televised loss against Mantaur on the January 29 episode of Action Zone. On the April 8 episode of Superstars, Polaco defeated the Intercontinental Champion Jeff Jarrett in a non-title match, which earned him a title shot against Jarrett for the Intercontinental Championship on the April 22 episode of Superstars, where Jarrett retained the title. Montoya appeared at the In Your House pay-per-view, where he attempted to prevent Jarrett and The Roadie from attacking Razor Ramon after a handicap match.

He made only one pay-per-view appearance in 1996 at the Royal Rumble, where he participated in the Royal Rumble match, where he lasted only two minutes until he was eliminated by Tatanka. His only highlight of the year was an upset victory against Jerry Lawler on the July 27 episode of Superstars, which he gained by pinning Lawler with Jake Roberts' DDT finishing move. He lost to Lawler in a rematch on the August 5 episode of Monday Night Raw. After the match, Lawler poured Jim Beam whiskey down his throat.

Throughout this time, Montoya became more of a lower card wrestler and even asked for his release in June 1997 when he was only being booked twice a month. The WWF initially declined and sent him to a developmental promotion United States Wrestling Association in Memphis to hone his skills, where he remained for seven weeks. He was then released on the condition that he could not work for rival promotion World Championship Wrestling, which was then luring wrestlers away from the WWF with the promise of larger salaries. Polaco was instead sent to Extreme Championship Wrestling as part of a talent exchange between WWF and ECW.

=== Extreme Championship Wrestling (1997–2001) ===
==== Undefeated streak and various feuds (1997–1999) ====
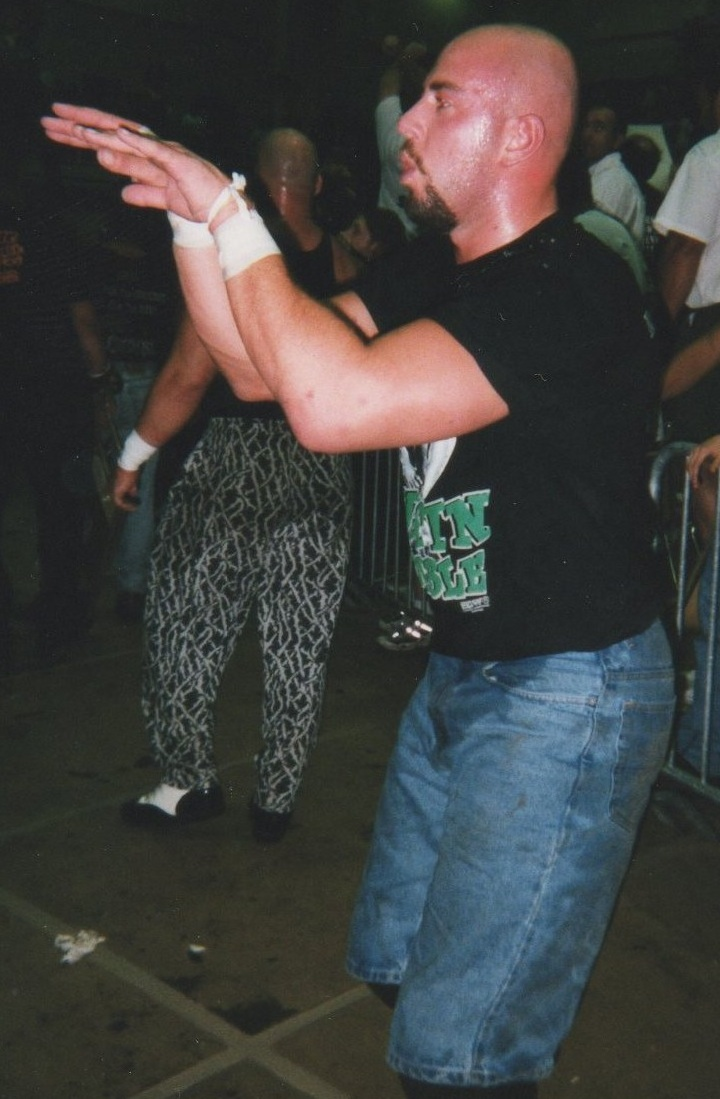
Polaco at an ECW event in 1998

Polaco joined ECW under the guidance of booker Paul Heyman, who promised to make him a star. He debuted in ECW as "PG-187" in a loss to Chris Candido on August 21, 1997. He later resumed his "PJ Walker" name. At As Good as It Gets, his character was repackaged as he shaved his head and switched to a grunge style of dress, and adopted a cocky, sneering, egomaniacal attitude. He was introduced by Jason Knight, who named him "Justin Credible" ("Just Incredible"). Credible defeated Jerry Lynn by debuting a new finisher called That's Incredible. He began an undefeated streak which included a notable win over The Great Sasuke on the October 24 episode of Hardcore TV. Credible suffered his first loss in ECW against Mikey Whipwreck in his pay-per-view debut at November to Remember. Credible continued his rivalry with Whipwreck, beating him in televised rematches on Hardcore TV, while losing again at Better Than Ever.

Credible quickly became a rising villain in the company and adopted Nicole Bass as his bodyguard. He began his next major feud with the company's veteran Tommy Dreamer in 1998. Credible defeated Dreamer in a first blood match at February's CyberSlam pay-per-view but lost to him in a match at Living Dangerously. Polaco was attacked by his returning nemesis Mikey Whipwreck after the match. The two resumed their rivalry as Credible defeated Whipwreck at Wrestlepalooza. During this time, Credible began a high-profile feud with Jerry Lynn as he lost to Lynn at It Ain't Seinfeld. Credible defeated Lynn in a two out of three falls match at A Matter of Respect and in a standard one-on-one match at the Heat Wave pay-per-view on August 2.

In the fall of 1998, Credible renewed his feud with Tommy Dreamer. He joined forces with Jack Victory and Rod Price against Dreamer and The Gangstanators (John Kronus and New Jack) in a Philly Street Fight at the UltraClash event, where his team lost. Polaco and Victory lost to Dreamer and Jake Roberts in a tag team match at the company's premier pay-per-view event November to Remember. However, he defeated Dreamer in the first-ever Stairway to Hell match at the Guilty as Charged pay-per-view on January 10, 1999, thanks to interference by Terry Funk.

==== Impact Players (1999–2000) ====
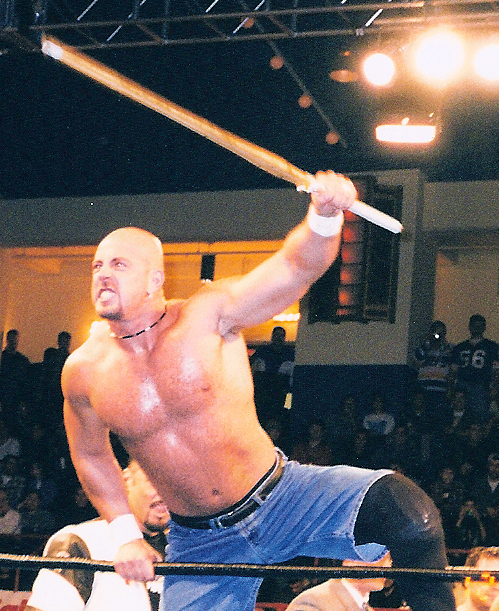
Credible at an ECW show in December 1999

In the midst of his rivalry with Tommy Dreamer, Polaco aligned himself with his mentor Lance Storm after the duo lost a three-way dance against Dreamer at House Party. Storm and Credible continued to feud with Dreamer until the duo formed a tag team at Crossing the Line called The Impact Players. They proclaimed themselves to be "New Franchise" after Shane Douglas teased his retirement but Douglas instead chose Dreamer as his successor. Impact Players were defeated by Dreamer and Douglas at Living Dangerously on March 21. Credible lost a match to Douglas at CyberSlam. The feud with Dreamer and Douglas ended when Douglas left the company in mid-1999. Following Douglas' departure, Credible faced Sid Vicious in a match at May's Hardcore Heaven, which ended in a no contest.

Impact Players began dominating the roster in singles and tag team competition and quickly earned main event status by feuding with the company's top wrestlers. They defeated Jerry Lynn and Sabu at the Hostile City Showdown event in June while lost to Lynn and Rob Van Dam in the main event of Heat Wave pay-per-view on July 18. Polaco then embarked on a feud with Sabu, which culminated in a match between the two at September's Anarchy Rulz pay-per-view, which Polaco won. Impact Players' next feud was with The Sandman and the ECW World Tag Team Champions Tommy Dreamer and Raven. At November to Remember, Impact Players teamed with Rhino against Sandman, Raven and Dreamer in a losing effort.

Impact Players continued their rivalry with Raven and Dreamer as they began pursuing the ECW World Tag Team Championship. On the January 7, 2000, episode of ECW on TNN, Credible defeated Dreamer in the second Stairway to Hell match. Impact Players were booked to win the titles from Raven and Dreamer at Guilty as Charged on January 9, 2000. A month later, Impact Players dropped the titles to Dreamer and Masato Tanaka on the March 3 episode of ECW on TNN. Shortly after, Mike Awesome and Raven won the titles from Dreamer and Tanaka. At Living Dangerously, Impact Players defeated both teams in a three-way dance to regain the World Tag Team Championship.

==== World Heavyweight Champion (2000–2001) ====
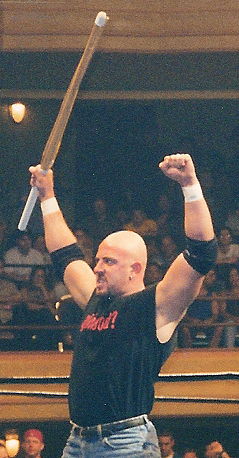
Justin Credible in August 2000 at Midtown Massacre

Polaco received the biggest push of his career at the CyberSlam event on April 22, when he and Jason attacked rival Tommy Dreamer and Raven after Dreamer defeated Taz to win the ECW World Heavyweight Championship. He threw down his ECW World Tag Team Championship belt and challenged Dreamer to defend the title against him on the spot to which Dreamer agreed. Polaco defeated Dreamer to win the title after Dreamer's valet Francine turned on Dreamer. From this point, Francine became Credible's valet. Credible became a loyal ally of The Network and the top wrestler of the group. Upon winning the World Heavyweight Championship, Credible vacated his half of the World Tag Team Championship and berated his mentor and tag team partner Lance Storm, leading to a rivalry between the two. At the Hardcore Heaven pay-per-view, Credible was scheduled to defend the title against Dreamer and Storm in a three-way dance but he refused to defend the title against anyone except Storm and threatened to throw the World Heavyweight Championship. Credible defended the title against Storm in a singles match, during which he injured Storm's valet Dawn Marie with a That's Incredible. Credible retained the title and was assaulted by Dreamer after the match. Credible successfully defended the title against Dreamer in the third Stairway to Hell match between the duo at Heat Wave.

Credible represented The Network with Rhino in a tournament for the vacant World Tag Team Championship in September. They defeated The Sandman and Chilly Willy in the first round before losing to Dreamer and Jerry Lynn in the quarterfinals. Credible defended his World Heavyweight Championship against Network's Steve Corino on the September 15 ECW on TNN, during which Corino brought Dawn Marie as his valet, who had been injured by Credible at Hardcore Heaven. Credible managed to retain the title but it stirred up problems between Credible and Corino. Credible successfully defended the title against Corino and Jerry Lynn in an elimination match on the September 29 episode of ECW on TNN, before losing the title to Lynn at Anarchy Rulz on October 1 after being hit with his own move That's Incredible, ending his five-month reign at 162 days.

Credible competed against Lynn, Corino and The Sandman for the title in a Double Jeopardy match, the following month at November to Remember. Corino and Credible eliminated Sandman and Lynn respectively and then Corino defeated Credible to win the title. Credible faced Corino and Lynn in a three-way dance for the title at Massacre on 34th Street, where Corino retained the title. He received another opportunity for the title against Corino and Sandman in a Tables, Ladders, Chairs and Canes match at the company's final pay-per-view Guilty as Charged, where Sandman won the title. He competed against Sandman in the final match in the history of ECW on January 13, 2001, which he won but offered a rematch, which he lost to Sandman.

=== Return to World Wrestling Federation / World Wrestling Entertainment (2001–2003) ===
With ECW facing imminent bankruptcy and Paul Heyman becoming unable to pay the roster, Polaco returned to the WWF as Justin Credible in February 2001, immediately forming an alliance with X-Pac and assisting him in his pursuit of the WWF Intercontinental Championship. The duo eventually formed a stable with Albert known as X-Factor. X-Pac and Credible tried several times to win the WWF Tag Team Championship, but were unsuccessful. The team split when Credible aligned himself with Paul Heyman's band of ECW insurgents and helped form The Alliance with World Championship Wrestling (WCW). Credible remained on the company's "B" shows, forming a team with Raven, until Team Alliance lost at Survivor Series.

Credible was fired along with the rest of the Alliance roster (in kayfabe) by Vince McMahon until Ric Flair was able to save his job and get him drafted over to the Raw brand in March 2002. On the Raw brand, Credible wrestled mostly on Sunday Night Heat and lost many singles matches he was in, but managed to become an eight-time WWE Hardcore Champion. His last match on Raw was a squash match in which he was defeated by Batista. Polaco was released on January 20, 2003, with his final televised WWE appearance being a loss to Test on the December 8, 2002, episode of Heat.

=== Independent circuit (2003–2006) ===
Polaco wrestled for numerous independent promotions. He appeared several times for Ring of Honor, where he was a member of the Carnage Crew, and for Xtreme Pro Wrestling, where he feuded with Shane Douglas. He appeared with Total Nonstop Action Wrestling (TNA), forming a stable with several other ex-ECW wrestlers and reviving his feud with Jerry Lynn. He was also briefly a member of the Xtreme Horsemen in Major League Wrestling with C. W. Anderson, Steve Corino, and Simon Diamond, who were briefly managed by J. J. Dillon. In June 2005, Polaco appeared in all Hardcore Homecoming event. He was defeated by Jerry Lynn at June 10, by Sandman at September 15 and by Lynn again at September 18. He defeated Lynn at the final Hardcore Homecoming event in a Steel Cage match. Also, he interfered at ECW One Night Stand match between his mentor Lance Storm and Chris Jericho, attacking Jericho with a kendo stick.

On November 13, 2005, Polaco, wrestling as P.J. Polaco, was announced as the "mystery opponent" for Raven on the TNA pay-per view, Genesis. Polaco lost the match after Raven hit a DDT.

Credible signed a contract with the MTV "Wrestling Society X" stating that if MTV decided to turn the "one time special" into a full season, he would complete the season and would be unable to compete anywhere else for that time period. He was released from his contract on June 5, 2006. Polaco was in the main event of the first Wrestling Society X Show, the WSX Rumble. He was the first person in the match and the last one eliminated.

=== Second return to World Wrestling Entertainment (2006) ===
Polaco was rehired by World Wrestling Entertainment in June 2006. He returned to WWE television at the June 7 WWE vs. ECW Head to Head event as a member of the ECW brand of WWE, taking part in a 20-man battle royal. He made several appearances on ECW on Sci Fi before being released from his WWE contract on September 28, 2006. During his brief WWE run he won two matches, both by disqualification defeating Balls Mahoney and Sabu. He also lost to CM Punk in Punk's ECW debut match.

=== Return to the independent circuit (2006–present) ===
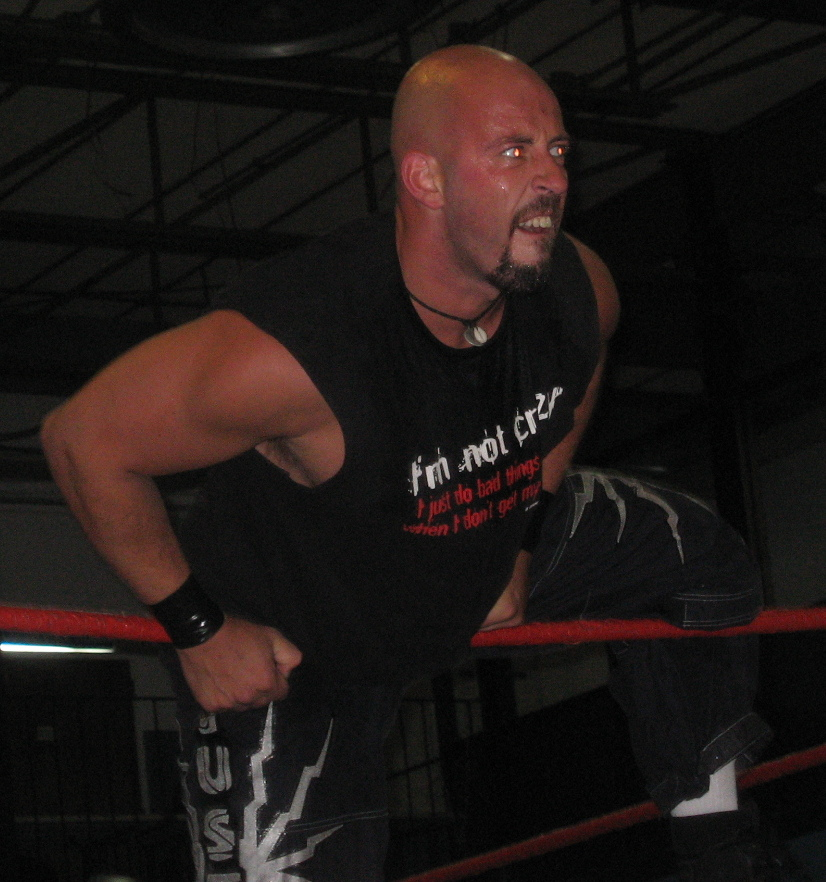
Credible in 2007

Polaco returned to the independent circuit in 2006 using the name "Justin Time". He wrestled for the Pro Wrestling Syndicate promotion, along with fellow original ECW wrestlers Sabu, Danny Doring and Julio Dinero, as well as making appearances for the Insane Clown Posse owned Juggalo Championship Wrestling. On March 29, 2009, he became the Big Time Wrestling Champion, defeating "Hurricane" John Walters with Ric Flair as special guest referee, but Credible was stripped of the title in August of the same year.

Justin is also the topic of an upcoming documentary The Price of Fame which also includes Ted DiBiase and Sean Waltman. He was inducted into the New England Pro Wrestling Hall of Fame on July 12, 2009. On August 8, 2010, Polaco returned to TNA to take part in the ECW-themed pay-per-view Hardcore Justice where he performed as P.J. Polaco due to the WWE owning the rights to the Justin Credible name; Polaco was defeated by Stevie Richards. Afterwards, he was assaulted by former rival The Sandman with a Singapore cane. On January 14, 2012, Credible returned to the former ECW Arena, when he was defeated by Sabu at an Evolve event in the venue's final professional wrestling match.

On April 28, 2012, Polaco was scheduled to wrestle on Shane Douglas' Extreme Reunion show, but was removed from the card, as well as the building after being found "slumped over, passed out asleep" in a chair. While he begged management to be let back on the show, they denied his request and kicked him out a second time. On August 8, 2012, Chikara announced that Polaco, returning to his Aldo Montoya character, would be making his debut for the promotion in the following month's 2012 King of Trios tournament, where he would team with the 1-2-3 Kid and Tatanka as "Team WWF". In their first round match on September 14, Team WWF was defeated by The Extreme Trio (Jerry Lynn, Tommy Dreamer and Too Cold Scorpio).

Polaco retired on November 20, 2015, after facing long-time rival Tommy Dreamer at a Pro Wrestling Syndicate event. Credible came out of retirement and faced Matt Tremont in a winning effort at CZW show in August 2016.

In March 2017, he returned to wrestling, and teamed with The Sandman & New Jack in a winning effort at an ECPW show.

== Personal life ==
Polaco is of Portuguese ancestry. His parents emigrated to the United States from Portugal three years before he was born. He speaks Portuguese fluently. Polaco and his wife Jill Marie Polaco (née Jurecki) were married on June 4, 1997. They have three sons: Nicholas (born April 2000), Christian, and Jasper.

In 2018, Polaco was arrested three times between August and December for violating a protection order.

Polaco and writer/wrestler Kenny Casanova released the book Just a Dream to... Justin Credible! in November 2021. It chronicled the personal life and wrestling career of Polaco up to that point.

In March 2025, Maven Huffman, fellow ex-WWE wrestler, conversed with Polaco as a follow-up to a significant number of accusations of Polaco failing to send merchandise to fans after receiving payment and no-showing independent shows, or showing up in a condition unsuited to perform. While Polaco refuted or denied various claims made, he would concede that there were some instances in which, "...by the time I buy food [with the money sent] I don't have the money to send it [the merchandise] ... I wasn't ready to do that, I wasn't equipped to do that".

== Championships and accomplishments ==
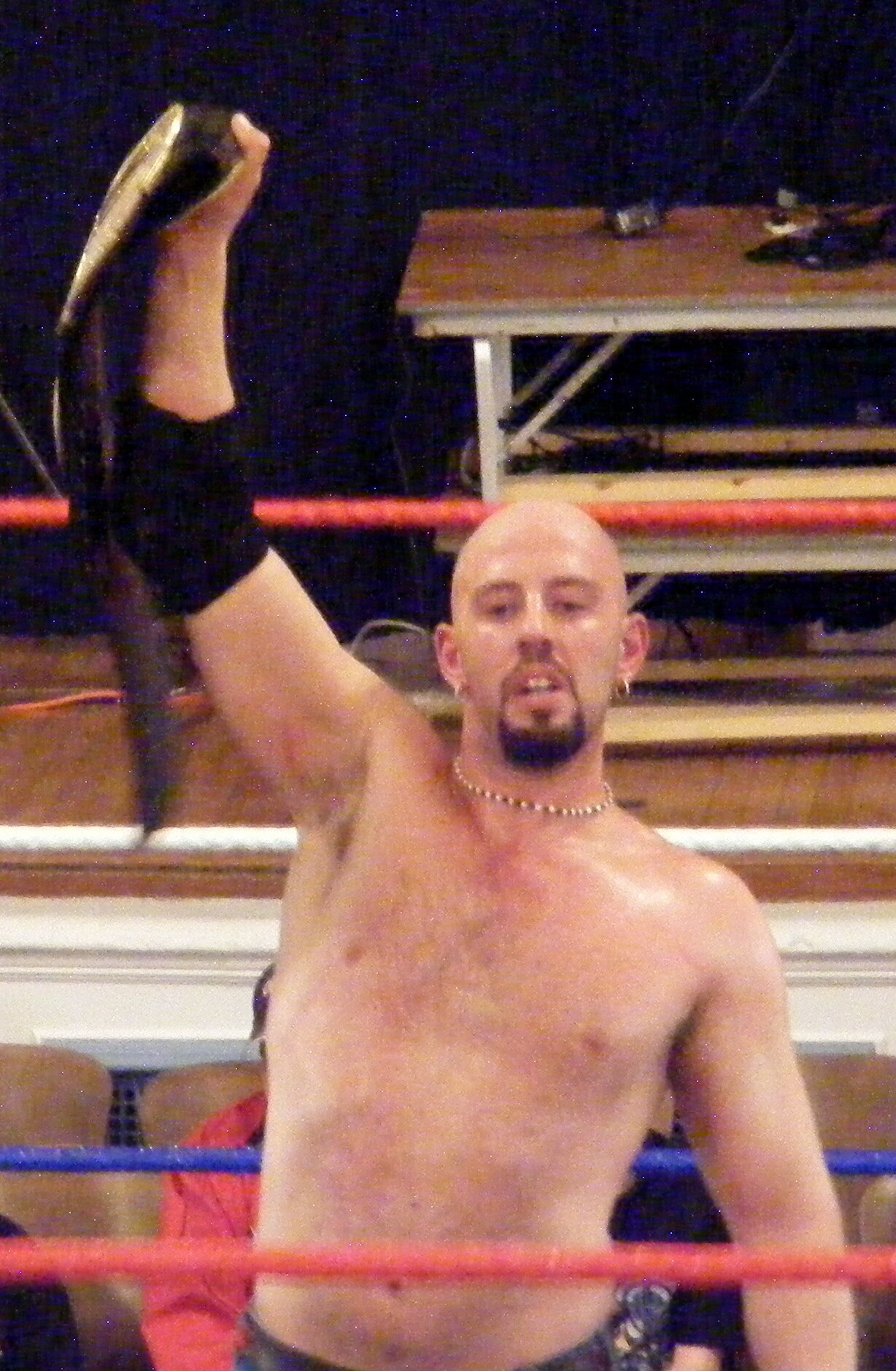
Polaco as Big Time Wrestling Heavyweight Champion in March 2009.

- Big Time Wrestling (Northeast)
  - BTW Heavyweight Championship (1 time)
- Extreme Championship Wrestling
  - ECW World Heavyweight Championship (1 time)
  - ECW World Tag Team Championship (2 times) – with Lance Storm
- Fight The World Wrestling
  - FTW World Heavyweight Championship (1 time)
- Immortal Championship Wrestling
  - ICW Dippin Donuts 24/7 Championship (1 time)
- Impact Championship Wrestling
  - ICW World Heavyweight Championship (1 time)
- Independent Wrestling Entertainment
  - IWE Heavyweight Championship (2 times)
- Intense Championship Wrestling
  - ICW World Heavyweight Championship (1 time)
- Insane Championship Wrestling
  - ICW Heavyweight Championship (1 time)
- Intense Competition Wrestling Federation
  - ICWF Northeast Championship (1 time)
- New England Pro Wrestling Hall of Fame
  - Class of 2009
- New England Wrestling Association
  - NEWA Tag Team Championship (1 time) – with Garfield Quinn
- Powerhouse Wrestling
  - PHW Heavyweight Championship (1 time)
- Premier Wrestling Federation
  - PWF Universal Heavyweight Championship (2 times)
- Pro-Pain Pro Wrestling
  - 3PW World Heavyweight Championship (1 time)
- Pro Wrestling Illustrated
  - PWI ranked him No. 6 of the top 500 singles wrestlers in the PWI 500 in 2000
- Renegade Wrestling Federation
  - RWF Heavyweight Championship (1 time)
- Texas Wrestling Academy
  - TWA Heavyweight Championship (1 time)
- Top Rope Promotions
  - TRP Heavyweight Championship (1 time)
- Powerhouse Wrestling
  - PHW Heavyweight Champion (1 time)
- Valour Pro Wrestling
  - VPW Tag Team Championship (1 time) - with Mr. Grim
- World Wrestling Federation / World Wrestling Entertainment
  - WWF/E Hardcore Championship (8 times)
- World Wrestling Organization
  - WWO Heavyweight Championship (1 time)
