= Brainbuster =

Professional wrestling throw

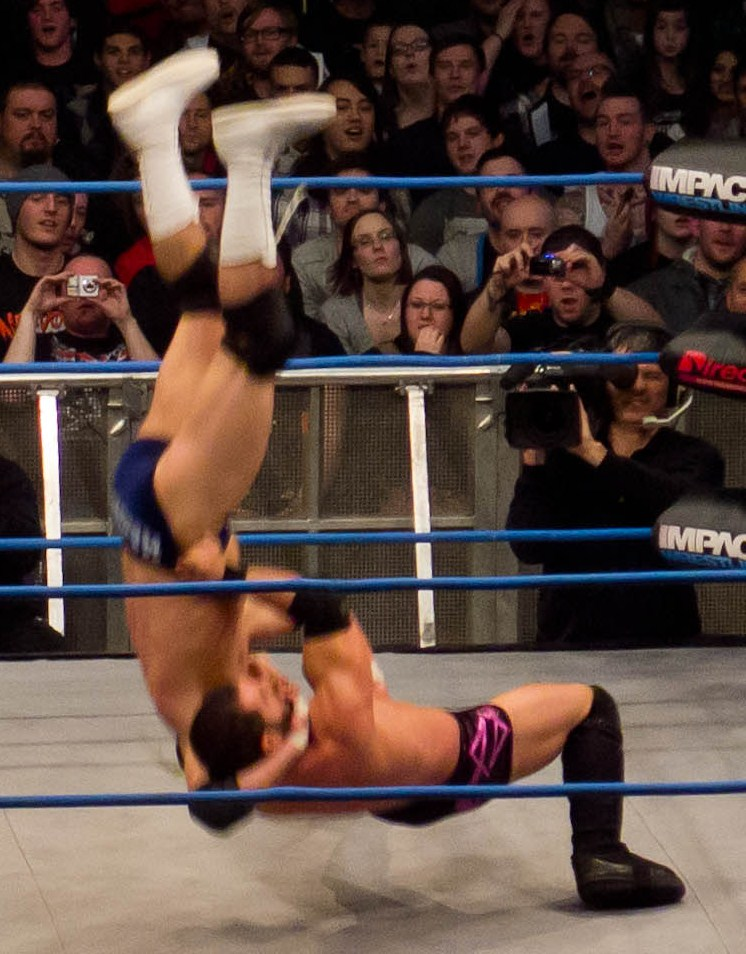
Austin Aries performing a brainbuster to Mark Haskins.

A brainbuster is a professional wrestling throw in which a wrestler puts the opponent in a front facelock, hooks their pants or thigh, and lifts them up as if they were executing a vertical suplex. The wrestler then falls onto their back so that the opponent lands on their head while remaining vertical. This move is a version of the DDT. It was innovated by Killer Karl Kox. In Japanese puroresu, the term "brainbuster" refers to a regular vertical suplex, while the move elsewhere known as a brainbuster is referred to as a "sheer drop brainbuster" or a "vertical (drop) brainbuster".

The brainbuster was banned in WWE until WrestleMania XL, because the person receiving the move will land on the top of their head or neck without protection, as evident at the Super ShowDown of 2019 in Saudi Arabia, when Goldberg (who was concussed during the match) failed to execute his "Jackhammer" finisher on the Undertaker and performed an unprepared brainbuster instead. However it has supposedly been reintroduced as of April 06, 2024, as Sami Zayn used the move to turn the tide, and eventually win his Intercontinental Championship match against Gunther.

== Variants ==
=== Cradle brainbuster ===
Also known as a belly-to-belly brainbuster, the wrestler stands facing a standing opponent and then wraps both arms around the opponent's torso, lifting them off the ground. The wrestler then shifts their grip so they are holding the opponent by their legs, gripping the opponent behind the knee. The wrestler then removes one arm from the opponent's leg and quickly applies a front facelock with that arm, lifts the opponent as if they were using a vertical suplex, and lands the opponent on the back of their head.

=== Delayed brainbuster ===
Also known as the hanging brainbuster, this is a variation of the standard brainbuster in which the executing wrestler holds their opponent in a vertical suplex position for up to 10 seconds before completing the maneuver. Koko B. Ware used this as the Ghostbuster.

=== Double underhook brainbuster ===
Innovated by The Great Sasuke, this move is also known as the original Michinoku Driver (not to be confused with its more popular successor) and a butterfly brainbuster, this move sees a wrestler first face an opponent and apply a double underhook, then lifting the opponent upside down and falling backwards down to the mat onto their back, driving the opponent head-first down to the mat. It is also the primary finisher of Jon Moxley who calls it Death Rider in NJPW and Paradigm Shift in AEW.

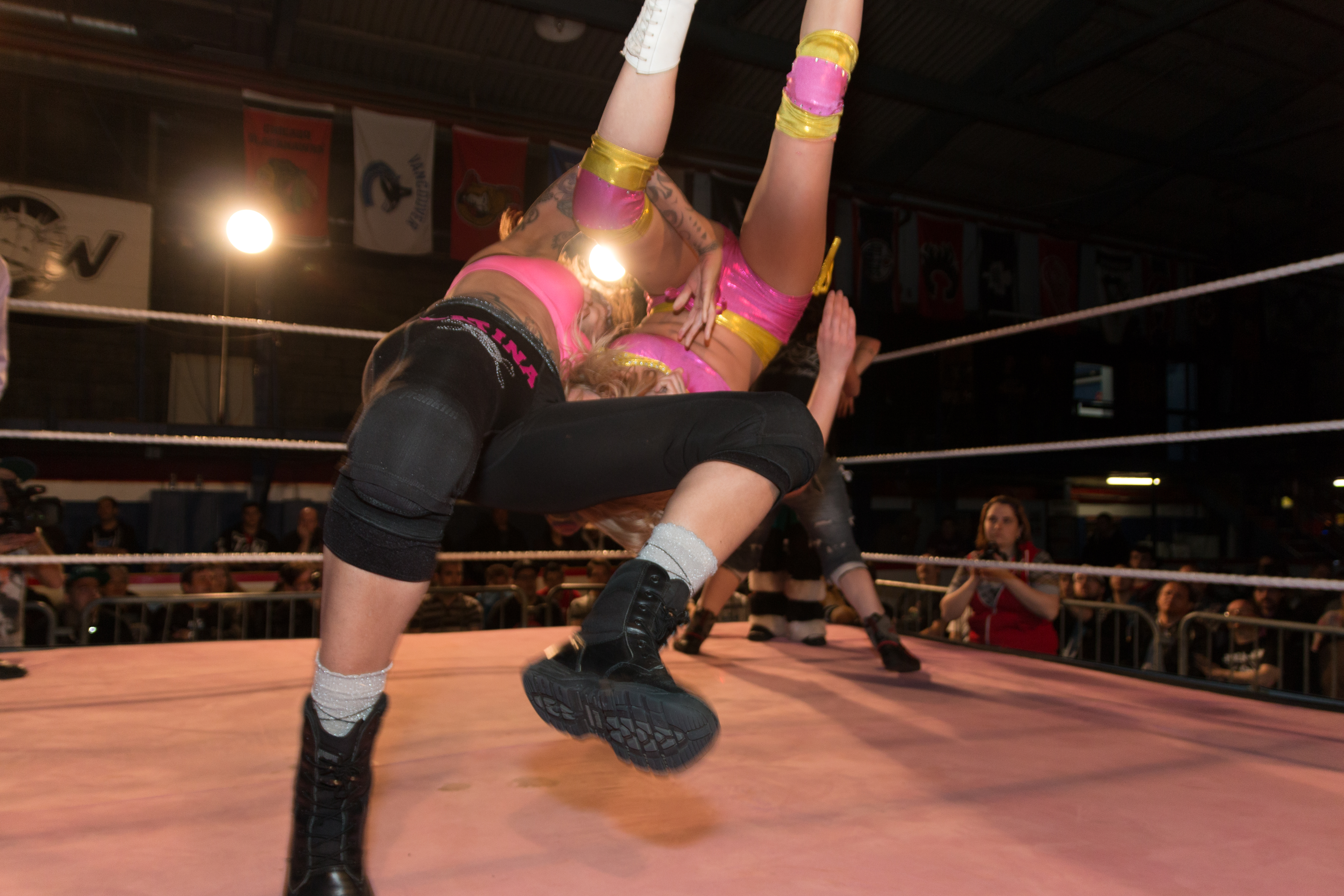
Mercedes Martinez performing a fisherman buster on Leah von Dutch

=== Fisherman buster ===
A fisherman buster is a variation of the brainbuster in which the wrestler hooks the opponent's leg to aid in lifting them off the ground. With the opponent elevated, the wrestler performs a fisherman suplex, driving the head of the opponent into the ground. This move is also known as a Fisherman brainbuster or a Leg hook brainbuster Yoshi-Hashi uses this as his finisher.

==== Cross-legged fisherman buster ====
In this variation, the wrestler puts the opponent in a front facelock and uses their free arm to go under the opponent's near leg and hook the far one. After lifting the opponent off the ground, the wrestler jumps up and falls down on their back, slamming the opponent down to the mat head first.

==== Small package driver ====
A variation of the fisherman buster, in this version the wrestler traps the opponent's free leg between their own legs when delivering the move, resulting in a small package. It is used by Seth Rollins who named his version God's Last Gift, and Kushida, who calls it Back To The Future.

==== Wrist-clutch fisherman buster ====
This variation involves grabbing and pulling by the opponent's wrist, then lifting them up into the air, before falling to their back, slamming the opponent to the ground on the back of their head/neck. It is used by Jun Akiyama who calls it Sternness Dust Gamma.

=== Inverted brainbuster ===
The wrestler begins behind and facing a standing opponent. The wrestler then pulls the head of the opponent back and applies an inverted facelock to the opponent with one arm. The wrestler then places their other arm under the lower back of the opponent, using that arm to elevate the opponent until they are vertical. The wrestler then jumps up and falls down on their back, driving the head of the opponent to the mat. This move is used by Konosuke Takeshita.

=== Jumping brainbuster ===
Also known as the spike brainbuster or brainbuster DDT. Instead of just falling down onto their own back, the attacking wrestler jumps up and uses their momentum to drive the opponent down onto the top of their head.

=== Northern Lights buster ===
A variation of the brainbuster in which the wrestler lifts the opponent as if they were using a Northern Lights suplex and lands the opponent on the back of their head.

=== Scoop brainbuster (Northern Lights Bomb) ===
This move sees the wrestler put the opponent in a front facelock, scoop one of the opponent's thighs with their free hand, lift the opponent upside down, and then drop to their side or back, driving the opponent to the mat on their neck and shoulders, or on the top of their head. Innovated by Akira Hokuto and popularized by her husband Kensuke Sasaki as Northern Lights Bomb. Tetsuya Naito calls this move Valéntia. Al Snow popularized the move in America, dubbing his version the Snowplow. Ridge Holland currently uses this as the Northern Grit as well as Giulia and Eddie Kingston who both use it as a finishing move.

=== Single underhook brainbuster ===
This variation is performed when a wrestler faces the opponent and hooks one of their arms, lifts the opponent upside down, then falls backwards to the mat onto their back, driving the opponent down on their head. It is used by Finn Bálor in the WWE as 1916, formerly known as Bloody Sunday during his New Japan Pro Wrestling tenure.

=== Cross-arm brainbuster ===
This variation is performed when a wrestler faces the opponent and crosses both of their arms on the opponent's chest before lifting the opponent upside down, then falling backwards to the mat onto their back, driving the opponent down on their head.

=== Twisting brainbuster ===
Also known as a revolution brainbuster, this brainbuster is performed when the wrestler delivering the maneuver twists their body while holding the opponent in the upwards position, usually dropping their opponent during the rotation. Masaaki Mochizuki is the Japanese wrestler who popularized this move and called Twister as finisher. Peyton Royce uses this move as her finisher dubbed Deja Vú.

== See also ==
- Professional wrestling throws
- Suplex
