= Balls Mahoney =

American professional wrestler (1972–2016)

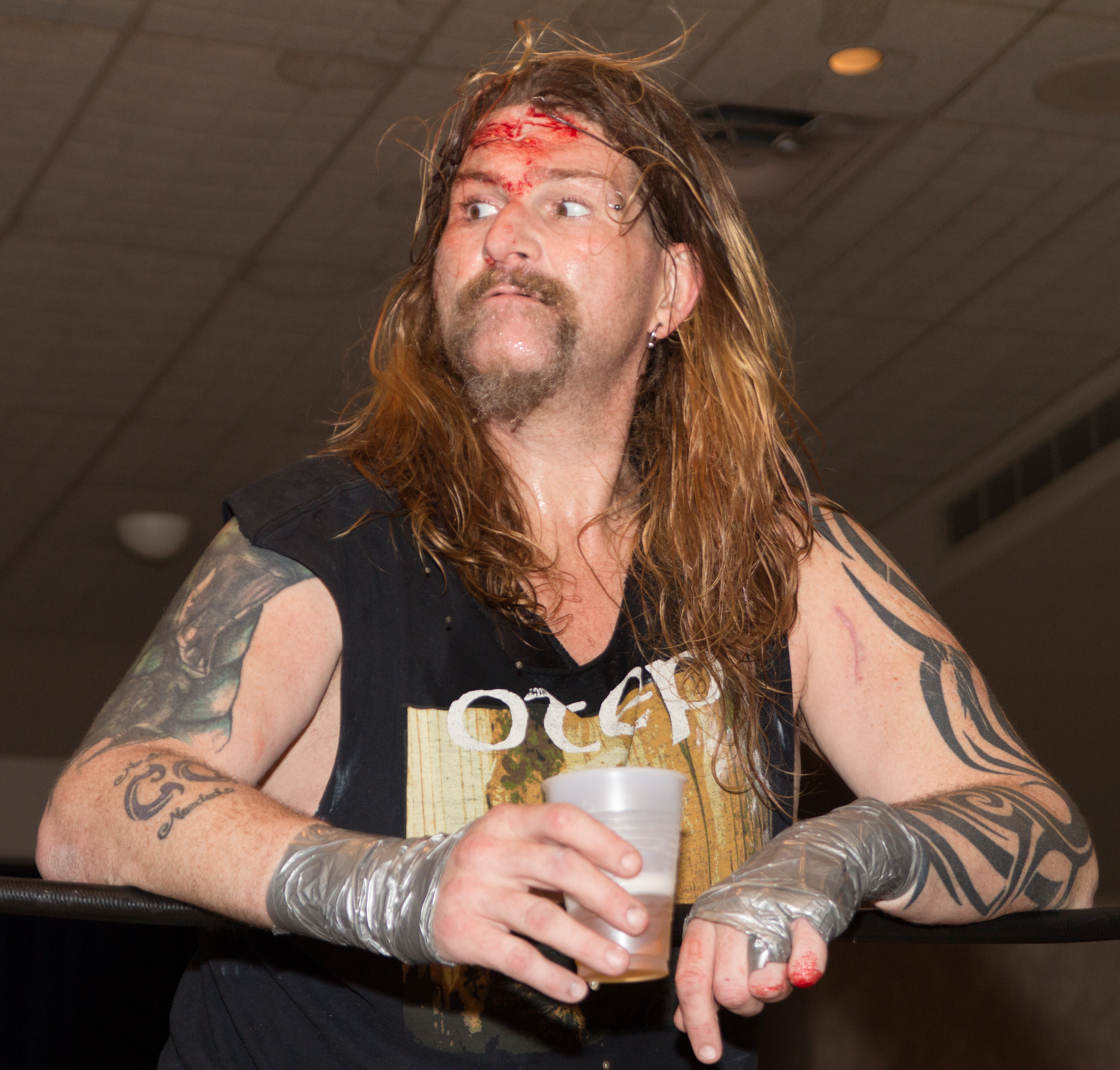
- Mahoney in 2013

Personal information
- Born: Jonathan Rechner; April 11, 1972 Spring Lake Heights, New Jersey, U.S.
- Died: April 12, 2016 (aged 44) Spring Lake Heights, New Jersey, U.S.
- Cause of death: Heart attack
- Spouse: Gayle Schechter (m. 2006)
- Children: 1

Professional wrestling career
- Ring name(s): Abbudah Singh; Abudda Dein; Balls Mahoney; Ballz Mahoney; Boo Bradley; Jon Rechner; Kahoneys; Mahoney; Xanta Klaus
- Billed height: 6 ft 2 in (188 cm)
- Billed weight: 305 lb (138 kg)
- Billed from: The South Pole (as Xanta Klaus); Nutley, New Jersey (as Balls Mahoney); Asbury Park, New Jersey (as Boo Radley)
- Trained by: Larry Sharpe
- Debut: 1987

Jonathan Rechner (April 11, 1972 – April 12, 2016), better known by his ring name Balls Mahoney, was an American professional wrestler best known for his appearances with Extreme Championship Wrestling (ECW) and World Wrestling Entertainment (WWE).

== Early life ==
Rechner was born in Spring Lake Heights, New Jersey and graduated from Manasquan High School in 1991, where he competed on the school's wrestling team.

== Professional wrestling career ==
=== Early career (1987–1993) ===
After training at Larry Sharpe's Monster Factory, Rechner debuted at the age of 15 in 1987. He wrestled under the Middle Eastern gimmick of "Abbudah Singh" on the New Jersey independent circuit and threw fireballs at his opponents, on one occasion accidentally scorching Abdullah the Butcher when he spat fire onto his chest.

=== Smoky Mountain Wrestling (1994–1995) ===
He made a name for himself as Boo Bradley Jr. (a take-off of the character Boo Radley from To Kill a Mockingbird) in Smoky Mountain Wrestling (SMW). He was originally allied with Chris Candido and managed by Tammy Sytch, who abused him for months, but they eventually turned on him, killing his pet cat and turning him into a fan favorite in the process. He formed a friendship with Cactus Jack during this time. After his battles with Candido, he moved on to a feud with Killer Kyle of the Gangstas. During his time in SMW Bradley won the SMW Beat the Champ Television Championship twice.

=== World Wrestling Federation (1992–1993, 1995–1996) ===
From September 1992 to July 1993, he appeared under his real name in the World Wrestling Federation (WWF) as a jobber, losing to the likes of Papa Shango, Marty Jannetty and Virgil on Superstars and Wrestling Challenge.

At the In Your House 5: Seasons Beatings pay-per-view on December 17, 1995, while Savio Vega and "Santa Claus" were at ringside handing out presents and playing to the fans, villainous manager "Million Dollar Man" Ted DiBiase appeared and proclaimed that everyone had a price, even Santa. As Vega argued with DiBiase, Rechner, as "Santa", jumped him from behind and attacked him. DiBiase laughed his trademark laugh and introduced this warped Santa as Xanta Klaus, who was from the South Pole and stole presents. Rechner made two more appearances under this character, including on the following night's edition of Monday Night Raw before never being mentioned again.

=== Mid Eastern Wrestling Federation (1996–1997) ===
After WWF, Rechner wrestled as Boo Bradley for Mid Eastern Wrestling Federation where he became the MEWF Mid-Atlantic Champion.

=== Extreme Championship Wrestling (1996–2001) ===
==== The Hardcore Chair Swingin' Freaks (1996–1999) ====
In 1996, Rechner signed with Extreme Championship Wrestling (ECW) and debuted at Holiday Hell on December 7 as "Balls Mahoney", defeating Devon Storm. His original gimmick was that of a gay biker who humped his opponents. In early 1997, he went on a losing streak against opponents like Mike Awesome at House Party on January 11, Lance Storm on February 1 at Crossing the Line Again, Stevie Richards on February 22 at CyberSlam and The Sandman on March 15 at Hostile City Showdown. On July 6, at Wrestlepalooza, Mahoney and Sandman were defeated by The Dudley Boyz (Buh Buh Ray and D-Von).

On August 2, Mahoney teamed with Axl Rotten to defeat the Full Blooded Italians (Little Guido and Tracy Smothers), but lost to them in a rematch at As Good As It Gets on September 20. Capitalizing on the ECW crowd's lust for violence and the hardcore attitude, Mahoney was never seen without his signature steel chair, usually with some kind of writing or sign placed on it, which he used as a weapon. He would come to the ring to the AC/DC song "Big Balls" and lead the crowd in singing the chorus before or after his matches. The duo were now a regular tag team and were informally known as "The Hardcore Chair Swingin' Freaks". At November to Remember on November 30, he and Rotten took part in a Four-Way Dance for the ECW World Tag Team Championship; The F.B.I. retained the titles. At House Party on January 10, 1998, they teamed with Tommy Dreamer to defeat The F.B.I. and Tommy Rich in a six-man tag team match. Mahoney and Rotten participated in three-way dances at CyberSlam on February 21 and Living Dangerously on March 1 and failed to win the titles from Chris Candido and Lance Storm on May 3 at Wrestlepalooza.

At November to Remember on November 1, Mahoney and new partner Masato Tanaka won the ECW World Tag Team Championship from the Dudley Boyz. Six days later, Mahoney and Tanaka dropped the titles to the Dudleyz in a rematch. At Guilty as Charged on January 10, 1999, he and Rotten defeated the F.B.I. and Danny Doring and Roadkill in a three-way dance. After defeating Steve Corino on March 21 at Living Dangerously, Mahoney, Rotten and New Jack lost to the Dudleyz and Mr. Mustafa in an Ultimate Jeopardy match at CyberSlam on April 3. At Hardcore Heaven on May 16, Mahoney and Spike Dudley failed to win the World Tag Team Championship from the Dudleyz, but won them in a Street Fight on July 18 at Heat Wave. They again lost the titles to the Dudleyz on August 12. On August 14, Mahoney and Dudley defeated the Dudleyz in another rematch on ECW on TNN to win back the World Tag Team Championship. At The Last Show at the Madhouse on August 26, they again lost the titles to the Dudleyz.

At Anarchy Rulz on September 19, ECW World Television Champion Rob Van Dam was scheduled to defend his title against Johnny Smith but before the match, Mahoney, Rotten and Dudley attacked Smith and took him out of the match. Mahoney then challenged RVD for the title in a losing effort. At November to Remember on November 7, Mahoney and Rotten lost to Da Baldies (Spanish Angel, Tony DeVito, Vito LoGrasso, and P. N. News) in a 4-on-2 handicap match.

==== Final days of ECW (2000–2001) ====
Mahoney defeated Kintaro Kanemura at Living Dangerously on March 10, 2000, lost to former tag team partner Masato Tanaka at Hardcore Heaven on May 14 and F.B.I. member Sal E. Graziano at Heat Wave on July 16. He then formed a tag team with Chilly Willy and lost to Da Baldies at Anarchy Rulz on October 1, before defeating them in a Flaming Tables match at November to Remember on November 5. At Massacre on 34th Street on December 3, Mahoney lost to EZ Money. Mahoney's final ECW appearance was at ECW's final pay-per-view Guilty as Charged on January 7, 2001, where Mahoney and Chilly Willy's match with Simon Diamond and Johnny Swinger ended in a no contest.

=== Independent circuit (2001–2006) ===
After ECW folded, Rechner spent time in a number of independent promotions, most notably USA Pro Wrestling (UXW) and as Juggalo Championship Wrestling (JCW), where he united with The Dead Pool (Violent J, Shaggy 2 Dope, and Raven) to become The Dead Pool 2000. He made his debut for the International Wrestling Cartel (IWC) at Super Indy on March 22, 2002, where he teamed with The Sandman to face Jimmy Vegas and Shirley Doe in a losing effort. On January 9, 2004, he appeared at the Jersey All Pro Wrestling (JAPW) and Ring Of Honor (ROH) joint show Collision Course, losing to ROH World Champion Samoa Joe. He made an appearance in Total Nonstop Action Wrestling (TNA) on January 21, teaming with The Sandman in a loss to The Gathering. On November 13, Mahoney defeated Doe at Accept No Limitations to win the IWC Heavyweight Championship. He lost the title back to Doe in a Street Fight on December 11 at A Call To Arms 2. At the Hardcore Homecoming Reunion Tour on September 16, 2005, Mahoney and Ian Rotten lost to the Dudleyz.

=== Return to WWE (2005, 2006–2008) ===
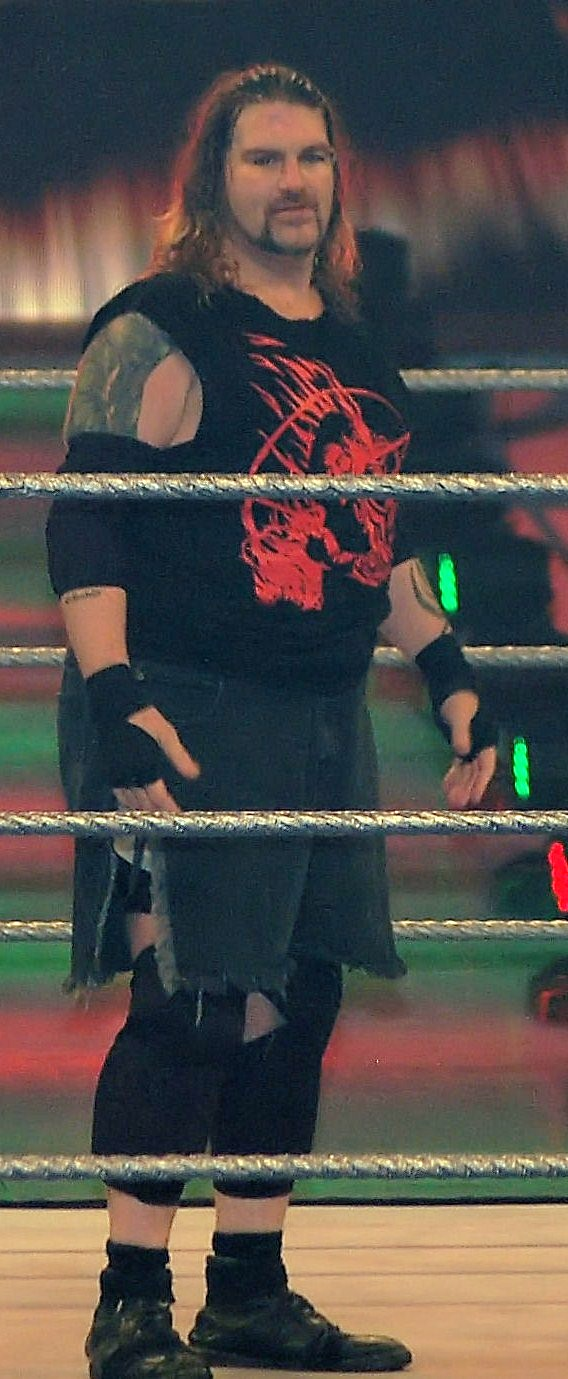
Balls in an ECW ring in December 2005

On June 12, 2005, Balls Mahoney made a non-wrestling appearance at the World Wrestling Entertainment-promoted ECW One Night Stand reunion show, taking part—alongside Axl Rotten—in a brawl with Kid Kash, Tommy Dreamer, The Sandman, the Dudley Boyz, and The Blue World Order (bWo) before the main event. After the main event, Mahoney and Rotten returned to the ring to brawl with the "invading" Raw and SmackDown! wrestlers.

In 2006, when WWE relaunched ECW as their own brand, Mahoney was one of the first wrestlers to be signed. In an exchange of blows, ECW fans would often chant "Balls!" when Rechner landed a punch or kick on an opponent, and "Nuts!" when his opponent retaliated. During the "cross promotion" hype, Balls appeared on the June 5 edition of Raw with other ECW wrestlers who proceeded to attack WWE Champion John Cena. He appeared again as part of the ECW team in the "WWE vs. ECW team battle royal" at the WWE vs. ECW Head to Head event on June 7. At ECW One Night Stand on June 11, he defeated Masato Tanaka following a chair shot to Tanaka's head.

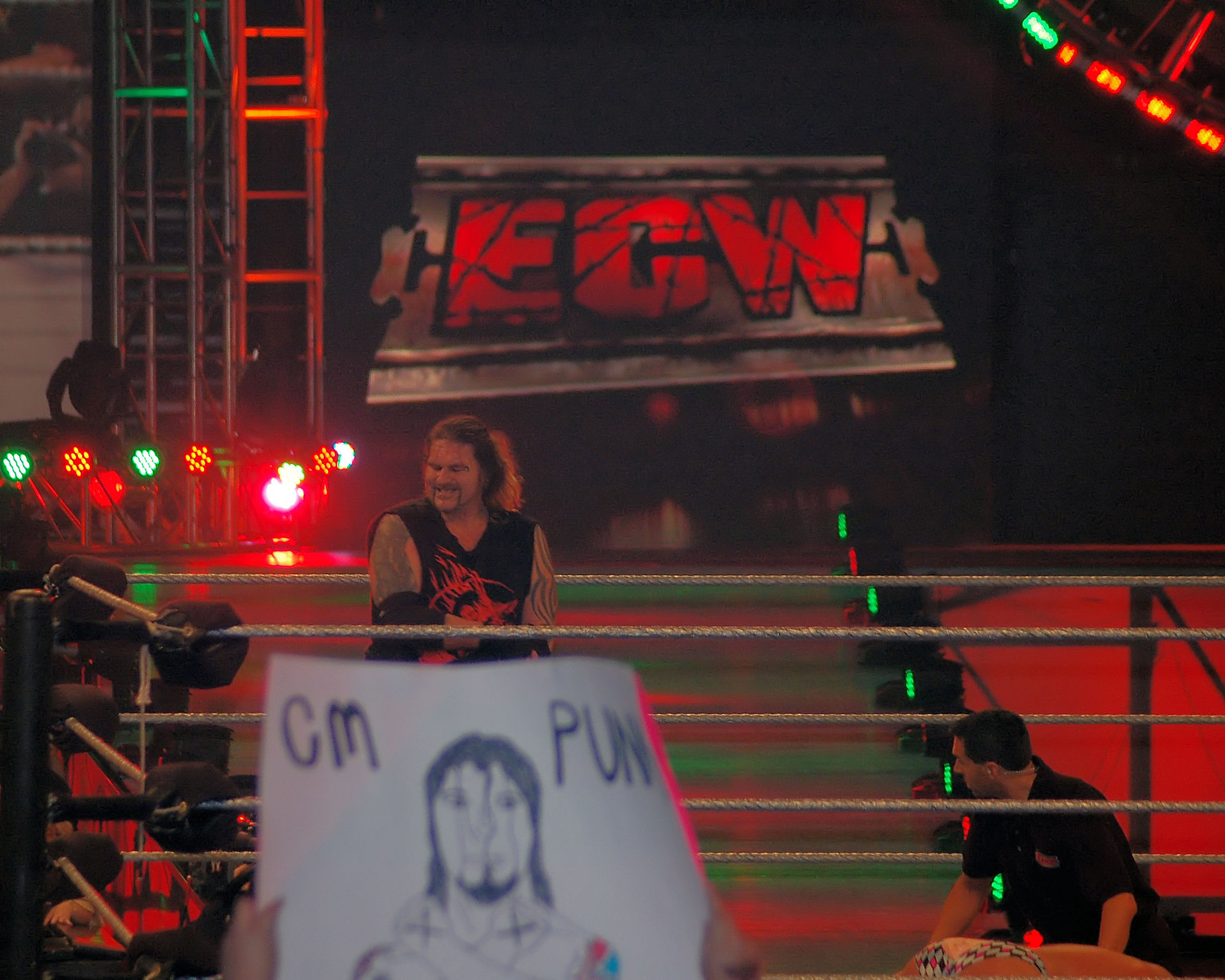
Balls in the ring at ECW December to Dismember in December 2006

When ECW on Sci Fi debuted, Balls wrestled sporadically. He started to appear in vignettes talking about how tough he was, elevating his role on the show. On the September 5 episode, Mahoney entered a feud with Kevin Thorn after Thorn and his valet Ariel cost him a match against Stevie Richards and René Duprée the next week. The following week, he brought Francine to ringside with him in her first appearance in a revived ECW ring, where she got into a catfight with Ariel. This pairing was short-lived as Francine was released shortly after. On December 3, at December to Dismember, Mahoney defeated Matt Striker in a Striker's Rules match. On January 2, 2007, on ECW on Sci Fi, he had one of his front teeth legitimately knocked out during a match with Thorn. Mahoney, Tommy Dreamer and the Sandman faced Bobby Lashley in a 3-on-1 Hardcore handicap match for the ECW World Championship on the June 5 episode of ECW, in which they were defeated.

On the August 7 episode of ECW, during a match with The Miz, which he lost, Kelly Kelly showed concern about Mahoney. In the following weeks, he asked her out and flirted with her backstage, but was interrupted by The Miz, Brooke and Layla before Kelly could get a word in. Regardless, Kelly still showed interest in him each week, wishing him good luck before his match and cheering him on during his match. He asked if she would go out with him, to which she could not respond due to The Miz taking her backstage. On the October 17 episode of ECW, Kelly asked Mahoney out, starting an on-screen relationship between the two.

On February 29, 2008, Balls made his return to television on SmackDown, facing Big Daddy V. The match ended in a no contest after The Undertaker chokeslammed Mahoney. Mahoney was released from his WWE contract on April 28.

=== Later career (2008–2016) ===
Mahoney returned to the independent circuit for Maryland Championship Wrestling (MCW) on May 4, 2008, teaming with Adam Flash, Corporal Punishment and Danny Doring to defeat Christian York, Joey Matthews, The Bruiser and Zachary Shane. He appeared for the International Wrestling Syndicate (IWS) on May 17, losing to Abyss in a No Disqualification match. In August, Mahoney wrestled for Pro Wrestling Revolution (PWR) as part of a tour in Portugal. On December 13, he took part in the World Wrestling Council's (WWC) annual event WWC Lockout in Bayamón, Puerto Rico, facing Abdullah the Butcher in his final WWC match with Carlos Colón as the special guest referee, which Abdullah won by disqualification.

On February 28, 2009, he appeared for Jersey All Pro Wrestling (JAPW) and took part in the Jersey City Rumble, but was eliminated by Danny Demanto. On April 16, Mahoney and Brother Runt appeared on TNA Impact! to wish Team 3D luck in their match at Lockdown. They were later attacked by Beer Money, Inc. During this time, he regularly made appearances for National Wrestling Superstars (NWS). Mahoney made an appearance for Insane Clown Posse's Juggalo Championship Wrestling (JCW) at the 10th Annual Gathering Of The Juggalos on August 8, interfering in a "Loser Leaves JCW" match between 2 Tuff Tony and Viscera, which also featured WWE Hall of Famer Terry Funk as a special guest referee. After Viscera won the match, Mahoney joined him and Funk in attacking Tony.

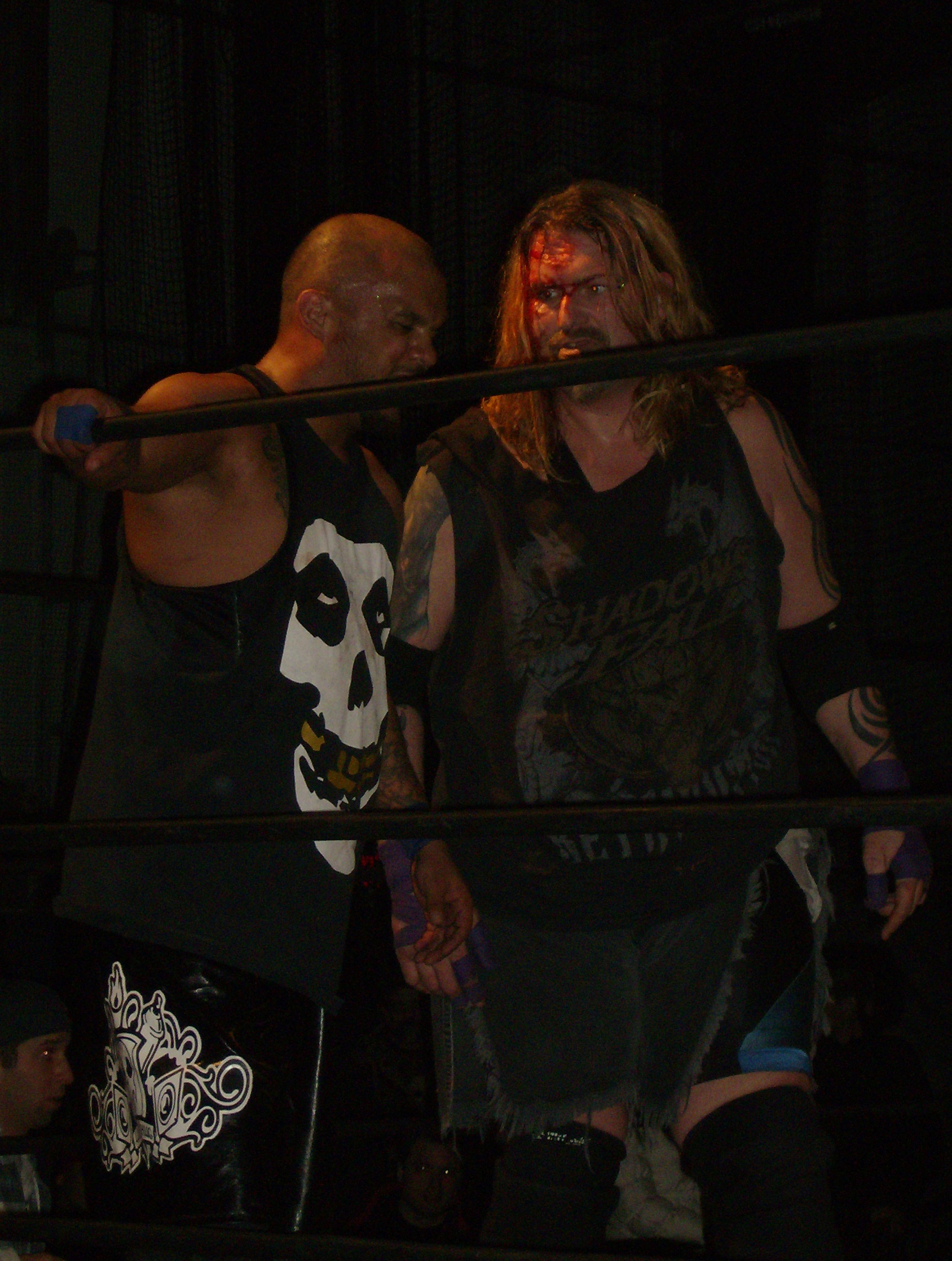
Mahoney and Homicide at FTW Rise Against in March 2011

He made his sole debut for Ring of Honor (ROH) on May 8, 2010, saving Grizzly Redwood from Erick Stevens and The Embassy. On July 29, it was confirmed that Mahoney would take part in TNA's ECW reunion show Hardcore Justice on August 8. His name was later erased from the event's official website. At the event, Rechner, using the ring name Kahoneys, teamed with Axl Rotten and lost to Team 3D in a South Philadelphia Street Fight. After the match, he vented his frustrations on Rotten, proclaiming that he would never team with him again. On September 11, at Glory By Honor IX, now under the ring name Ballz Mahoney, he and Redwood lost to Stevens and Necro Butcher. Mahoney reunited with Rotten at a JAPW show on October 23, where they unsuccessfully challenged Monsta Mack and Havok for the JAPW Tag Team Championship in a three-way match, which was won by Sami Callihan and Chris Dickinson.

On July 31, 2011, Mahoney appeared at the International Wrestling League (IWL) pay-per-view Extreme Reinforcements in Tlalnepantla de Baz. He returned to JCW at "Legends and Icons" on August 12, competing in a seven-way, which Rhyno won. At IWL's First Anniversary show on September 17, Mahoney and Low Rider won a fatal four-way tag team match to become the number one contenders for the IWL Tag Team Championship, but they never held the titles. On October 18, 2014, Mahoney was defeated by Sabu to crown the first WWL Extreme Champion at Insurrection. Mahoney's last match took place at the Deathproof Fight Club (DFC) event A Very Deathproof Christmas on December 6, 2015 in Toronto, Ontario, defeating Shaunymo in a Flaming Tables match.

== Personal life ==
Rechner's son, Christopher, was born on November 15, 2007.

Rechner had numerous tattoos, including two tribal pieces, a dragon and inverted pentagram on his arm (he was a member of the Church of Satan), and a tattoo dedicated to deceased wrestler, and the namesake of his son, late friend, Chris Candido. Rechner and Candido were childhood friends who got their start in the wrestling business setting up rings for local shows during their teenage years and eventually trained together at the Monster Factory.

On August 21, 2010, Rechner was charged with disorderly conduct after brandishing a knife during a staged fight with fellow wrestler "Calypso" Jim Zaccone in South Brunswick, New Jersey. The fight was meant to drum up publicity for an upcoming match in Perth Amboy, New Jersey.

== Death ==
On April 12, 2016, a day after his 44th birthday, Rechner died suddenly at his home in Spring Lake Heights, New Jersey. While watching Jeopardy! on TV he laid on his side to get more comfortable, and moments later his wife noticed he was unconscious. She immediately called 911 and attempted CPR, but he was dead before medics arrived. Days before his death, he injured his hip after a fall and had to use a walker.

An autopsy report in August revealed that Rechner had died of a heart attack. In October, it was revealed Rechner had experienced CTE. As a result of the diagnosis, the Rechner family became part of a class-action lawsuit against the WWE over these reports and was represented by attorney Konstantine Kyros. U.S. district judge Vanessa Lynne Bryant dismissed the lawsuit in September 2018.

== Championships and accomplishments ==
- Assault Championship Wrestling
  - ACW Heavyweight Championship (1 time)
  - ACW Hardcore Championship (1 time)
- All World Wrestling League
  - AWWL Heavyweight Championship (1 time)
- Extreme Championship Wrestling
  - ECW World Tag Team Championship (3 times) – with Spike Dudley (2), and Masato Tanaka (1)
- Fight The World Wrestling
  - FTW World Heavyweight Championship (2 times)
- International Wrestling Association
  - IWA Hardcore Championship (1 time)
- International Wrestling Cartel
  - IWC Heavyweight Championship (1 time)
- National Wrestling Superstars
  - NWS Hardcore Championship (1 time)
  - NWS Six Man Tag Team Championship (1 time) – with Ba-Bu and La-Fu
- Pro Wrestling Illustrated
  - PWI ranked him #99 of the top 500 singles wrestlers in the PWI 500 in 2000
  - PWI ranked him #443 of the 500 best singles wrestlers of the PWI Years in 2003.
- Pro Wrestling Xtreme / Classic Championship Wrestling
  - PWX World Heavyweight Championship (1 time)
- Smoky Mountain Wrestling
  - SMW Beat the Champ Television Championship (2 times)
- USA Xtreme Wrestling
  - UXW Heavyweight Championship (7 times)

== See also ==
- List of premature professional wrestling deaths
