= OnlyWrestlers =

American independent wrestling promotion and internet content subscription website

- Type: Private
- Industry: Online video platform; Paid subscription
- Genre: Video on demand, Livestreaming, Professional wrestling
- Founded: 2025 (1 year ago) in Reno, Nevada
- Founder: Rob Van Dam; Katie Forbes
- Headquarters: Reno, Nevada, United States
- Area served: Global
- Owner: Rob Van Dam; Katie Forbes
- Website: onlywrestlers.com

OnlyWrestlers is an internet content subscription service based in Reno, Nevada founded by WWE Hall of Famer, Rob Van Dam and Katie Forbes. The platform produces professional wrestling content for professional wrestlers and their fans. OnlyWrestlers also promotes several professional wrestling events under the name OnlyWrestlers Association.

== History ==
On September 29, 2024, Rob Van Dam announced the launch of OnlyWrestlers, a website that allows wrestlers to set their subscription prices, share a variety of content, and interact directly with their supporters. In the announcement, Katie Forbes, co-owner of the website, envisioned that the company would host events, and sanction championships. In 2025, OnlyWrestlers launched the OnlyWrestlers Association and promoted various events under the brand beginning with their first event on March 20, 2025 at the Vermont Hollywood in Los Angeles, California. The event featured various wrestlers from the independent circuit, Total Nonstop Action Wrestling (TNA), All Elite Wrestling (AEW), and Juggalo Championship Wrestling (JCW) along with title defenses for the JCW Women's Championship and JCW American Championship. On May 29, 2025, the TNA X-Division Championship was defended during OnlyWrestlers Chi-Town Beat Down event in at the Admiral Theatre in Chicago, Illinois when Moose defended the title against Bugs Moran and Monchose Mayhem. In addition to the X-Division Championship being defended, the JCW Tag Team Championship and the JCW Heavyweight Championship were also defended. On May 31, 2025, WildKat Pro Wrestling announced a joint show with OnlyWrestlers titled Bayou Beatdown and that it would be held on July 10, 2025 at the Alario Center in Westwego, Louisiana. During Bayou Beatdown, OnlyWrestlers crowned its first champion when Tessa Blanchard defeated Dani Mo and Persephone in a three way elimination match to win the OWA Women's World Championship.

== Professional wrestling championships ==
Championship	First champion	Date won	Days held	Location
OWA Women's World Championship	Tessa Blanchard	July 10, 2025	488+	Westwego, Louisiana

== Professional wrestling events ==
=== 2025 ===
Date	Event	Venue	Location	Main Event	Notes
March 20	Live from Hollywood	Vermont Hollywood	Los Angeles, California	Brian Cage vs. Chris Masters	
May 29	Chi-Town Beat Down	Admiral Theatre	Chicago, Illinois	Tessa Blanchard vs. Zeuxis	
July 10	Bayou Beatdown	Alario Center	Westwego, Louisiana	J. Spade vs. Raj Dhesi	Co-produced with WildKat Pro Wrestling
November 6	Legacy in the Lone Star	Hybrid School of Wrestling	San Antonio, Texas	Tessa Blanchard (w/Tully Blanchard) (c) vs. Kalientita for the OWA Women's World Championship	
December 11	Frozen Fury	Logan Square Auditorium	Chicago, Illinois	Moose vs. Marshe Rockett	
(c) – refers to the champion(s) heading into the match

=== 2026 ===
Date	Event	Venue	Location	Main Event	Notes
March 3	OnlyWrestlers Live from Los Angeles	Globe Theatre	Los Angeles, California	Tessa Blanchard (c) (w/Mile Moore) vs. Jada Stone for the OWA Women's World Championship	
April 28	OnlyWrestlers Live from Pittsburgh	Sunny Days Arena	North Versailles, Pennsylvania	Facade (c) vs. Joey Janela for the JCW American Championship	
July 7	Independence Rumble	Thunder Studios Arena	Long Beach, California	The Good Brothers (Doc Gallows and Karl Anderson) vs. LiveDanger (Danger Ross and LiveWire Charlie)	
(c) – refers to the champion(s) heading into the match
