= A Matter of Respect (1996) =

1996 Extreme Championship Wrestling supercard event

- The ECW Arena.
- Promotion: Extreme Championship Wrestling
- Date: May 11, 1996 (aired May 14, 21, and 28, 1996)
- City: Philadelphia, Pennsylvania, United States
- Venue: ECW Arena
- Attendance: 1,000

Event chronology
← Previous; Hostile City Showdown	Next → Fight the Power

A Matter of Respect chronology
← Previous; First	Next → 1998

A Matter of Respect was the first A Matter of Respect professional wrestling event produced by Extreme Championship Wrestling (ECW). It took place on May 11, 1996, in the ECW Arena in Philadelphia, Pennsylvania in the United States.

Excerpts from A Matter of Respect aired on episodes #160, #161, and #162 of the syndicated television show ECW Hardcore TV on May 14, 21, and 28, 1996. The full event was later released on VHS and DVD, as well as being made available for streaming on the WWE Network. The bout between 2 Cold Scorpio and Shane Douglas was included on the compilation DVD ECW: Unreleased Vol. 2 released by WWE in 2013.

== Background ==
Rob Van Dam and Sabu faced one another at Hostile City Showdown in May 1996. After Sabu won the match, he offered a handshake to Van Dam, who refused to shake his hand and walked away. This led to a rematch between the two men being scheduled for A Matter of Respect with the stipulation that the losing man was required to shake the winner's hand and declare their respect for them.

D-Von Dudley - the newest member of the Dudley Brothers - had debuted in ECW in April 1996, violently beating down the opponents of the Dudley Brothers. D-Von Dudley and Buh Buh Ray Dudley - the Dudley Boyz - had teamed together for the first time at Hostile City Showdown, only for the match to end in a no contest after D-Von Dudley attacked the referee. The Dudley Boyz teamed together once more at A Matter of Respect.

Raven had won the ECW World Heavyweight Championship in January 1996 and subsequently defended it against a string of challengers. After Pitbull #2 and the Sandman supposedly tied in a poll of fans to determine Raven's number one contender, a three way dance was booked for A Matter of Respect.

At Hostile City Showdown, Shane Douglas had attacked 2 Cold Scorpio after Scorpio objected to Douglas disrespecting the ECW World Television Championship, which Scorpio held. This led to Scorpio defending his title against Douglas at A Matter of Respect.

ECW World Tag Team Champions The Eliminators had begun feuding with the Gangstas upon challenging them at Massacre on Queens Boulevard, while Tommy Dreamer had begun feuding with Brian Lee in an extension of the long-running feud between Dreamer and Raven. This led to a match pitting Dreamer and the Gangstas against Lee and the Eliminators being booked for A Matter of Respect.

== Event ==
The event was attended by approximately 1,000 people. The referees for the event were Jim Molineaux, John Finnegan, and Paul Richards.

The opening bout was a singles match between Damián 666 and El Puerto Riqueño. After both wrestlers impersonated Sabu, he came to the ring and attacked both men, resulting in a no contest.

The second bout was a tag team match pitting Damien Kane and Devon Storm against the Dudley Boyz. After an angered D-Von Dudley gave chair shots to both opponents as well as his own partner, Buh Buh Ray Dudley, and finally the referee, Kane and Storm were declared the winners via disqualification. Following the match, Buh Buh Ray and D-Von argued with one another, with the other Dudley Brothers having to separate them.

The third bout was a tag team match pitting Axl Rotten and Hack Meyers against The Full Blooded Italians. The Full Blooded Italians won the match after Little Guido blocked a sunset flip attempt by Meyers and used his partner J.T. Smith's hand for leverage to pin Meyers.

The fourth bout saw ECW World Heavyweight Champion Raven defend his title against the Sandman and Pitbull #2 in a three way dance. The first elimination occurred when Raven hit Pitbull #2 with a loaded boot, then pinned him. Raven went on to eliminate the Sandman by giving him an Evenflow DDT on a guardrail then pinning him. After the match, the Sandman, Pitbull #1, and Pitbull #2 attacked Raven's lackey The Blue Meanie, with the Pitbulls giving him a superbomb. Afterwards, the Sandman offered his valet Missy Hyatt to the Pitbulls for the night to mark their alliance, resulting in a "catfight" between Hyatt and the Pitbulls' valet Francine.

The fifth bout was a singles match between Beef Wellington and Taz. Taz won a short squash match via submission using his Tazmission hold.

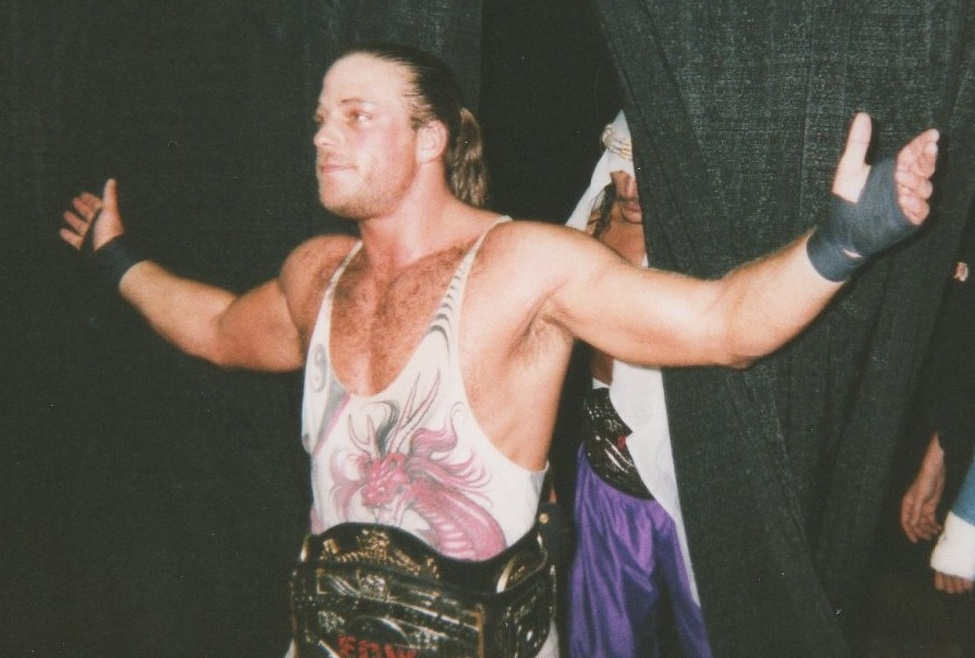
Rob Van Dam defeated Sabu at At Matter of Respect.

The sixth bout was a singles match between Chris Jericho and Mikey Whipwreck. Jericho won the bout by pinfall after giving Whipwreck a super butterfly suplex.

The seventh bout saw ECW World Television Champion 2 Cold Scorpio defend his title against Shane Douglas. Near the end of the match, Scorpio climbed the top rope, only for Douglas to trip him and execute a belly-to-belly suplex from the top rope, then pin him to win the ECW World Television Championship. Following the match, Douglas praised Scorpio and shook his hand, only for Scorpio to hit Douglas with the belt, then give him a piledriver followed by repeated diving leg drops, the last of them onto a steel chair placed on Douglas' face.

The eighth bout was a "respect match" between Rob Van Dam and Sabu, with the stipulation that the loser would be forced to shake the winner's hand. After a back and forth match, RVD delivered a split-legged moonsault to Sabu then pinned him. Following the match, the injured Sabu was briefly stretchered backstage before returning to the ring. Sabu attempted to shake Van Dam's hand, only for Van Dam to slap his hand away, saying "not only do I not respect you, you're a piece of shit". Van Dam then left the ring with Sabu's rival Taz and his manager Bill Alfonso.

The main event was a six-man tag team match pitting Tommy Dreamer and the Gangstas against Brian Lee and the Eliminators. After Stevie Richards interfered in the match, giving Dreamer a Stevie Kick to the back of his head, Dreamer's valets Beulah McGillicutty and Kimona Wanalaya came to the ring and hit him in the groin with a cinder block, then dragged him backstage by his groin. They later returned to the ring to give the cinder block to Dreamer to use as a weapon. Dreamer and the Gangstas went on to win the bout after New Jack gave John Kronus a chair shot followed by a 187 and then pinned him.

== Aftermath ==
The rivalry between Rob Van Dam and Sabu continued, culminating in a final match at Unlucky Lottery on September 13, 1996 which was won by Sabu, after which the two men went to shake hands until being attacked by The Can-Am Express.

At Fight the Power on June 1, 1996, Pitbull #2 received another shot at Raven's ECW World Heavyweight Championship after winning a six-man tag team championship. Raven granted him the title shot immediately, defeating the exhausted Pitbull #2 in a short match.

Shane Douglas was scheduled to defend his ECW World Television Championship against 2 Cold Scorpio at Fight the Power on June 1, 1996, but Scorpio was unable to compete due to a staph infection. A dispirited Douglas went on to issue a series of challenges, squashing several challengers before ultimately losing the title to Pitbull #2.

The Dudley Boyz teamed together against at Fight the Power, losing by disqualification after D-Von Dudley attacked the referee once again. Following the match, D-Von Dudley attacked the other Dudley Brothers, resulting in a lengthy feud that lasted until Crossing the Line Again on February 1, 1997 when the Dudley Boyz reconciled.

Brian Lee and Tommy Dreamer continued to feud, culminating in a tag team match pitting Lee and Raven against Dreamer and Terry Funk at November to Remember on November 16, 1996.

The feud between the Eliminators and the Gangstas continued, with the Gangstas eventually defeating the Eliminators for the ECW World Tag Team Championship at The Doctor Is In on August 3, 1996.

== Results ==
No.	Results	Stipulations	Times
1	Damián 666 vs. El Puerto Riqueño ended in a no contest	Singles match	—
2	Damien Kane and Devon Storm (with Lady Alexandra) defeated the Dudley Boyz (Buh Buh Ray Dudley and D-Von Dudley) (with Chubby Dudley, Dances with Dudley, and Sign Guy Dudley) by disqualification	Tag team match	14:01
3	The Full Blooded Italians (J.T. Smith and Little Guido) defeated Axl Rotten and Hack Meyers by pinfall	Tag team match	10:55
4	Raven (c) (with the Blue Meanie, Miss Patricia, and Stevie Richards) defeated Pitbull #2 (with Francine and Pitbull #1) and the Sandman (with 2 Cold Scorpio and Missy Hyatt) by pinfall	Three way dance for the ECW World Heavyweight Championship	18:26
5	Taz defeated Beef Wellington by submission	Singles match	4:35
6	Chris Jericho defeated Mikey Whipwreck by pinfall	Singles match	12:00
7	Shane Douglas defeated 2 Cold Scorpio (c) by pinfall	Singles match for the ECW World Television Championship	26:31
8	Rob Van Dam defeated Sabu by pinfall	"Respect match"	18:47
9	Tommy Dreamer and the Gangstas (Mustafa and New Jack) defeated Brian Lee and the Eliminators (Kronus and Saturn) by pinfall	Six-man tag team match	20:46
(c) / – the champion(s) heading into the match
