= A Matter of Respect (1998) =

1998 Extreme Championship Wrestling supercard event

- The ECW Arena.
- Promotion: Extreme Championship Wrestling
- Date: May 16, 1998
- City: Philadelphia, Pennsylvania, US
- Venue: ECW Arena
- Attendance: 1,600

Event chronology
← Previous; It Ain't Seinfeld	Next → UltraClash

A Matter of Respect chronology
← Previous; 1996	Next → Last

A Matter of Respect (1998) was the second and final A Matter of Respect professional wrestling supercard event produced by Extreme Championship Wrestling (ECW). It took place on May 16, 1998, in the ECW Arena in Philadelphia, Pennsylvania.

== Event ==
=== Preliminary matches ===
The opening match of the event was a two-out-of-three falls match between Jerry Lynn and Justin Credible. Lynn won the first fall by reversing a That's Incredible into a pinfall. In the second fall, Credible nailed a sunset flip powerbomb after knocking Lynn off the top rope and executed a That's Incredible to win the second fall. In the climax of the third fall, Lynn was about to hit a kneeling reverse piledriver to Credible until Jason interfered and Lynn hit a kneeling reverse piledriver to Jason and Chastity hit a hotshot to Lynn, allowing Credible to pin him with a small package for the win.

Next, Chris Chetti faced Jamie Dundee. Chetti knocked out Dundee with a side kick and nailed a springboard double jump moonsault for the win.

Next, Mikey Whipwreck took on Mike Lozansky. Near the end of the match, Lozansky climbed the top rope to perform a diving splash but Whipwreck countered by hitting a Whipper-Snapper for the win.

Next, John Kronus took on Danny Doring. Kronus executed a 450° splash on Doring for the win. After the match, Doring, The Equalizer and Ulf Herman attacked Kronus until Jack Victory and Kronus' tag team partner New Jack made the save and helped clear Lance Wright's sidekicks until Victory hit Jack in the head with a guitar, revealing himself to be Wright's associate.

In the following match, The Full Blooded Italians (Little Guido and Tracy Smothers) were scheduled to take on The Blue World Order (The Blue Meanie and Super Nova) but FBI attacked bWo before the match started and then Hardcore Chair Swingin' Freaks (Axl Rotten and Balls Mahoney) made the save, leading to a match between FBI and the Freaks. Rotten pinned Guido after a double chair shot for the win.

Later, Al Snow took on Bam Bam Bigelow. Near the end of the match, Chris Candido distracted Snow by trying to steal Head, which allowed Bigelow to perform a Greetings From Asbury Park on Snow for the win.

In the final match on the undercard, Chris Candido teamed up with Sabu to take on Lance Storm and Rob Van Dam. The match ended when Candido turned on Sabu, which led to Sabu and RVD attacking both Candido and Storm and the match ended in a no contest.

=== Main event match ===
The main event was a Stairway to Hell match pitting Spike Dudley, The Sandman and Tommy Dreamer against The Dudley Boyz (Buh Buh Ray Dudley, D-Von Dudley and Big Dick Dudley). After a back and forth match, Sandman hit a DDT to D-Von for the win.

== Reception ==
A Matter of Respect received mixed to negative reviews. LiveJournal staff gave it a D rating, quoting "Absolutely nothing doing here. Not a single match worth going out of your way for, which may explain why no one else has covered this show. Still, nothing actively offensive, so it wasn't XPW level bad."

The Wrestling Revolution staff considered it "an okay show from ECW". They mainly criticized the video quality, citing "horrendous, especially from the hardcam, which was so bright that looking at the fans in the first few rows, who were dressed in a multitude of different colors, was painful at times"

== Results ==
No.	Results	Stipulations	Times
1	Justin Credible (with Chastity and Jason) defeated Jerry Lynn	Two-out-of-three falls match	25:04
2	Chris Chetti defeated Jamie Dundee	Singles match	7:54
3	Mikey Whipwreck defeated Mike Lozansky	Singles match	5:42
4	John Kronus defeated Danny Doring (with The Equalizer, Lance Wright and Ulf Herman)	Singles match	3:41
5	bWo (The Blue Meanie and Super Nova) vs. The F.B.I. (Little Guido and Tracy Smothers) (with Tommy Rich) ended in a no contest	Tag team match	—
6	Hardcore Chair Swingin' Freaks (Axl Rotten and Balls Mahoney) defeated The F.B.I. (Little Guido and Tracy Smothers) (with Tommy Rich)	Tag team match	6:06
7	Bam Bam Bigelow defeated Al Snow	Singles match	7:13
8	Chris Candido and Sabu vs. Lance Storm and Rob Van Dam ended in a no contest	Tag team match	17:23
9	Spike Dudley, The Sandman and Tommy Dreamer (with Beulah McGillicutty) defeated The Dudley Boyz (Buh Buh Ray Dudley, D-Von Dudley and Big Dick Dudley)	Stairway to Hell match	24:25
