= Katie Forbes =

American professional wrestler, model, and digital content creator (born 1990)

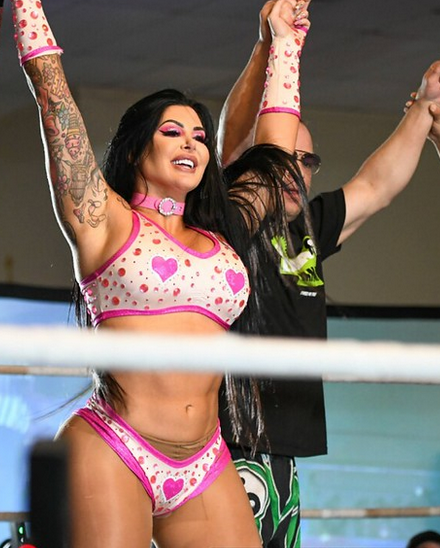
- Forbes in 2022

Personal information
- Born: December 31, 1990 (age 35) Tampa, Florida, U.S.
- Spouse: Rob Van Dam (m. 2021)
- Children: 2

Professional wrestling career
- Ring name(s): Katie Forbes; Khloe Hurtz
- Billed height: 5 ft 8 in (173 cm)
- Billed weight: 145 lb (66 kg)
- Trained by: Luke Hawx
- Debut: 2015

Katie Forbes (born December 31, 1990) is an American professional wrestler, model, and digital content creator. She is best known for her tenure in Impact Wrestling (TNA) and Continental Wrestling Entertainment (CWE) in India, as well as her marriage to WWE Hall of Famer Rob Van Dam. Forbes has also competed in River City Wrestling (RCW), Lingerie Fighting Championships (LFC), and Ultimate Women of Wrestling (UWW).

== Early life ==
Forbes was born in Tampa, Florida. She trained under independent wrestler and promoter Luke Hawx at the Louisiana-based WildKat Sports promotion.

== Professional wrestling career ==
=== Independent circuit (2016–2019) ===
Competing under the ring name Khloe Hurtz, Forbes worked across the Southern United States independent circuit, appearing in WildKat Sports and Championship Wrestling Entertainment (CWE). She developed her flamboyant "Billion Dollar Barbie" persona and worked mixed-tag and intergender bouts, often teaming with or against veteran talents.

Forbes toured India with The Great Khali’s promotion, Continental Wrestling Entertainment (CWE), between 2018 and 2019. On February 24, 2018, she won a battle royal at CWE Encounter '18 in Udaipur, Rajasthan to claim the vacant CWE Divas Championship. Later that same night, she lost the title to Sunny Jaat. In March 2019, Forbes defeated Reeta in Ludhiana to win the CWE Divas Title for a second time, before dropping it back to Reeta one week later in Bathinda.

In 2019, Forbes appeared in Lingerie Fighting Championships (LFC), wrestling Tracy Nyxx at LFC 39.

She also became a regular in Ultimate Women of Wrestling (UWW), an all-female promotion based in Las Vegas. On February 4, 2024, at UWW VI in San Antonio, Forbes defeated Leila Grey to win the UWW Intercontinental Championship.

=== Impact Wrestling (2019–2020) ===
Forbes made her Impact Wrestling debut at United We Stand on April 4, 2019, entering a four-way match for the Knockouts Championship against Jordynne Grace, Rosemary, and champion Taya Valkyrie. She later wrestled additional matches on Xplosion and became a regular on-screen presence in segments with Rob Van Dam, often as part of the "Cancel Culture" faction. Her run coincided with the COVID-19 pandemic, during which Impact Wrestling taped events without live audiences and relied on a reduced traveling roster. As a result, Forbes was featured less frequently in 2020. On September 28, 2020, Forbes and Van Dam quietly left the promotion following the expiration of their short-term agreements; the departure was reported as amicable, with potential for future returns.

=== Independent circuit return (2021–present) ===
In April 2021, Forbes appeared at a Frontline Pro event, teaming with Kal Herro to defeat Joey Avalon and Sierra. That same year, Forbes captured the RCW Women’s Championship in River City Wrestling, where she became a featured performer. She recorded victories against Claudia Del Solis in June 2021, Ki Vibez in May 2022, and Sheeva Queen in July 2022.

At Ultimate Women of Wrestling (UWW) #3 in December 2022, she defeated Renee Michelle, followed by a win over Jordan Blu at UWW #4 in June 2023. She lost a rematch to Blu at UWW #5 in September 2023. On February 4, 2024, at UWW #6 in San Antonio, she defeated Leila Grey to win the vacant UWW Intercontinental Championship. In April 2024, she returned to WildKat Sports, defeating Camus in a singles match. She also took part in Ed In San Antonio Productions' "Poder" event in May 2024 where she defeated Ricky Tenacious.

On March 6, 2025, Forbes challenged Dani Mo for the JCW Women’s Championship in the main event of JCW "Lunacy #25." On May 24, 2025, Forbes faced Gypsy Mac for the FSW Women’s Championship at FSW Mecca X: Beynefit For Bey in Las Vegas, but was defeated.

== Personal life ==
Forbes and Rob Van Dam began dating in 2017, announced their engagement in 2021, and later married. In March 2025, the couple revealed they were expecting their first child together.

On December 26, 2025, the couple welcomed twin daughters, one of whom is named after the late Sabu.

Alongside Van Dam, she launched Only Wrestlers, a subscription-based digital platform for wrestling content.

== Championships and accomplishments ==
- Continental Wrestling Entertainment
  - CWE Divas Championship (2 times)
- River City Wrestling
  - RCW Women’s Championship (1 time)
- Ultimate Women of Wrestling
  - UWW Intercontinental Championship (1 time)
- Pro Wrestling Illustrated
  - Ranked No. 49 of the top 100 female wrestlers in the PWI Female 100 in 2019
