= A Matter of Respect =

- Promotions: Extreme Championship Wrestling
- First event: A Matter of Respect (1996)
- Last event: A Matter of Respect (1998)

A Matter of Respect was a professional wrestling supercard event produced by Extreme Championship Wrestling (ECW). It took place in May 1996 and May 1998.

== Dates and venues ==
| Event | Date | City | Venue | Main event |
|---|---|---|---|---|
| A Matter of Respect (1996) | May 11, 1996 | ECW Arena | Philadelphia, Pennsylvania | Tommy Dreamer and The Gangstas (Mustafa Saed and New Jack) vs. Brian Lee and The Eliminators (John Kronus and Perry Saturn) |
| A Matter of Respect (1998) | May 16, 1998 | ECW Arena | Philadelphia, Pennsylvania | Spike Dudley, The Sandman and Tommy Dreamer vs. The Dudley Boyz (Buh Buh Ray Dudley, D-Von Dudley and Big Dick Dudley) in a Stairway to Hell match |
(c) – refers to the champion(s) heading into the match
