= Admiral Theatre (Chicago) =

Theatre in Chicago, Illinois, United States

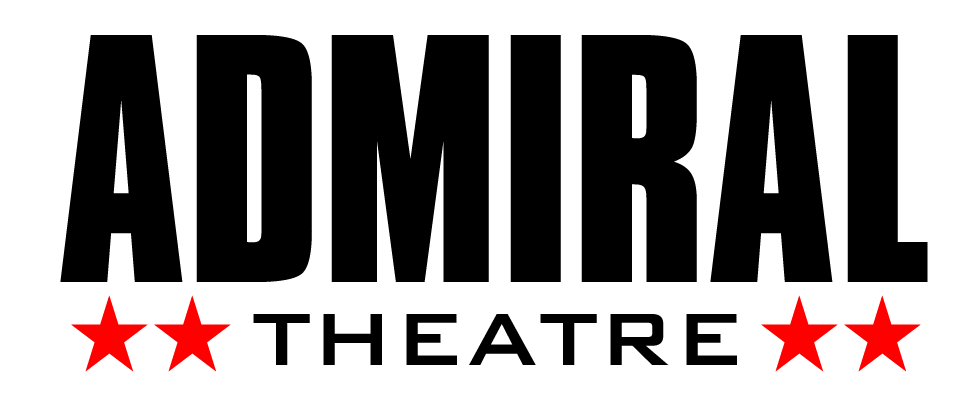

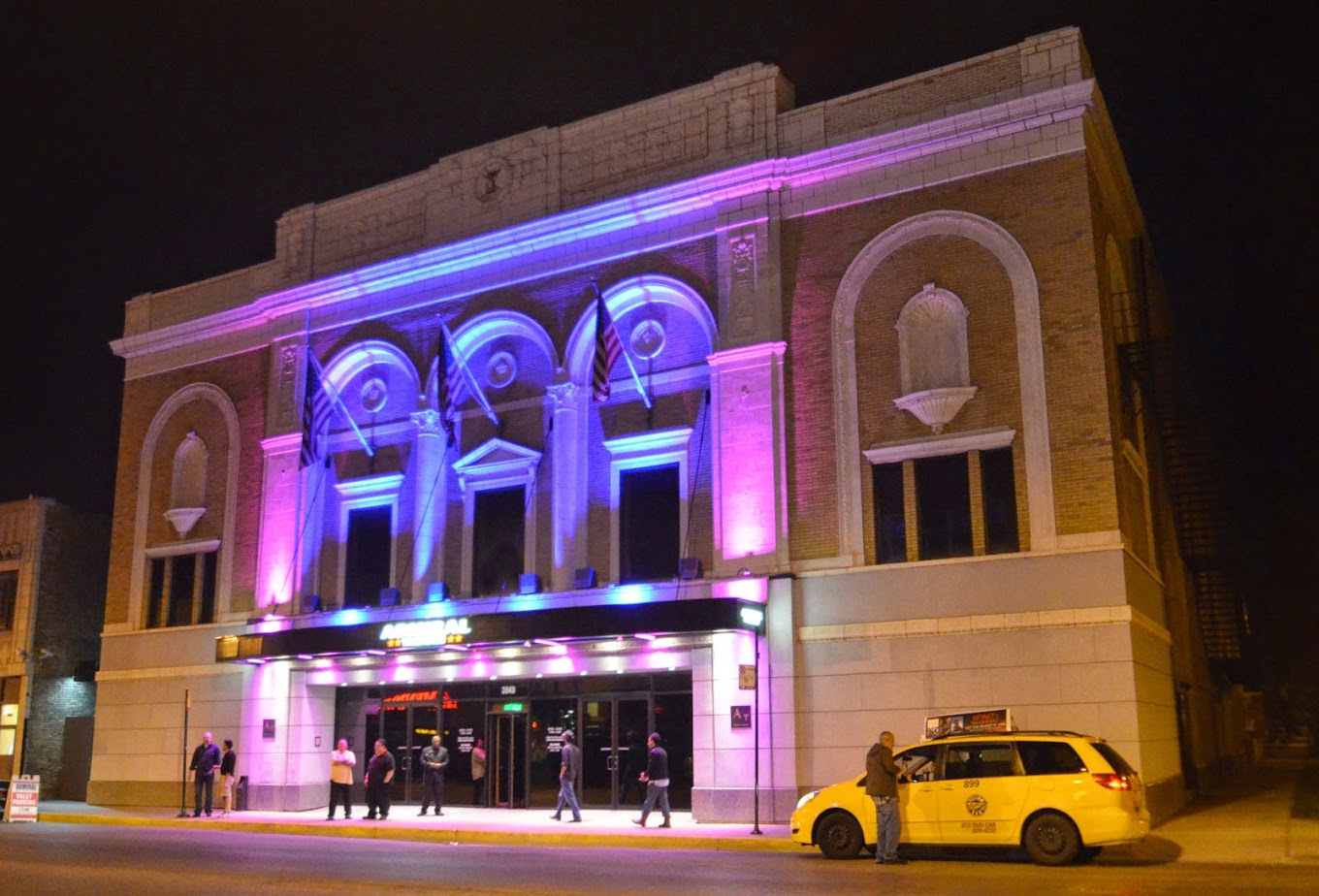
- Address: 3940 W Lawrence Avenue; Chicago
- Owner: Ryan Carlson
- Capacity: 1,645
- Type: Strip club

Construction
- Opened: 1927
- Architect: S. Scott Joy

Website
- admiralx.com

The Admiral Theatre in Chicago, Illinois, is a historic, landmark theater located on Lawrence Avenue, in the Albany Park area of Chicago, Illinois, presently operating as a strip club.

== History ==
Opened in 1927 and designed by renowned architects Harold Gallup and S. Scott Joy, the property originally featured both vaudeville and motion pictures. Equipped with a Marr & Colton organ, its first feature film played on March 31, 1927, starring Helene Chadwick in "Stolen Pleasures." Black and white films played successfully until 1942, when the property was purchased by Balaban and Katz Theater Corporation, making it their 58th theater in Chicagoland exclusively showing first-run mainstream films.

By the late 1950s, the post-World War II demographic change in Chicago drew many residents away from Albany Park, and the theater shut down. After sitting empty for almost a decade, it reopened on August 29, 1969, as a cartoon theater, charging 25 cents, closing again after a few months.

On December 26, 1969, the Admiral re-opened under an entirely new format, showing softcore pornographic films, the first of its kind in Chicago. Initially featuring films that would be considered tame by today's standards, such as topless women playing volleyball, by the mid-1970s, the theater featured multiple screens featuring non-stop hardcore pornographic films. It was the first theater in the Midwest to feature landmark films such as Deepthroat and Debbie Does Dallas. Such features prompted brutal harassment by the Chicago Police Department and the City of Chicago, which brought dozens of enforcement actions, raids, and arrests against the theater and its employees. In response, multiple federal lawsuits were filed and litigated, including some cases that set First Amendment case law and solidified the right to exhibit adult content.

While the ownership record of the property is murky during this period, by July 24, 1972, the property was owned by Patrick "Patsy Rich" Ricciardi. Ricciardi, widely regarded as a "made man" in the Chicago Outfit, moved to Chicago from Yonkers, NY, in 1957 and was a cousin of mob chieftain Felix "Milwaukee Phil" Alderisio. While Ricciardi denied ties to organized crime, the FBI believed that he led much of the Outfit's pornography racket, using the Admiral as his base of operations. According to the FBI, the Admiral also served as a base of operations for the Chicago Outfit's bookmaking and juice loan operations.

In 1982, the Chicago Sun-Times, in its investigative series "Sex For Sale," deemed the Admiral "the best-maintained of the city's nine adult movie houses... and among the cleanest and most comfortable (of any movie theater) in the city". On the afternoon of July 24, 1985, Ricciardi phoned his daughter for a ride to a meeting at a bar. She declined, and he took a taxi, only to be found two days later, shot in the head and locked in the trunk of a stolen Oldsmobile parked underneath elevated train tracks on Webster and Ashland. Ricciardi, considered a person-of-interest himself in various gangland murders (such as the murder of porn competitor Paul Gonsky), remains the victim of an unsolved cold case murder, although the Chicago Police Department speculates that his murder was an authorized hit for allegations of being a snitch or failing to pay adequate tribute money to the Chicago Outfit.

Louis Wolf, a notorious Chicago landlord twice imprisoned for arson and tax fraud, bought the property in 1986, subsequently installing Salvatore "Sam" Cecola as the proprietor. Cecola, who was not connected to Riccardi but was a reputed associate of the Chicago Outfit later imprisoned for tax fraud, decided to change the Admiral's business model in 1990, reimagining the business as an upscale "gentlemen's club" featuring nude dancers. Subsequently, the property has thrived as an adult nightclub, winning various industry awards and being widely regarded as one of the highest-grossing adult clubs in the country, netting its owner millions of dollars annually. The Admiral's events have even earned national media attention on Saturday Night Live and in other local and national press. Despite being nearly 100 years old, the facade and interior are in good shape, with the curtains, original plaster work, projectors, and movie screen still intact and the property winning a "Block Star Business" award by the local government for keeping the neighborhood clean and presentable.

== See also ==
List of strip clubs
