= Rob Van Dam =

American professional wrestler (born 1970)

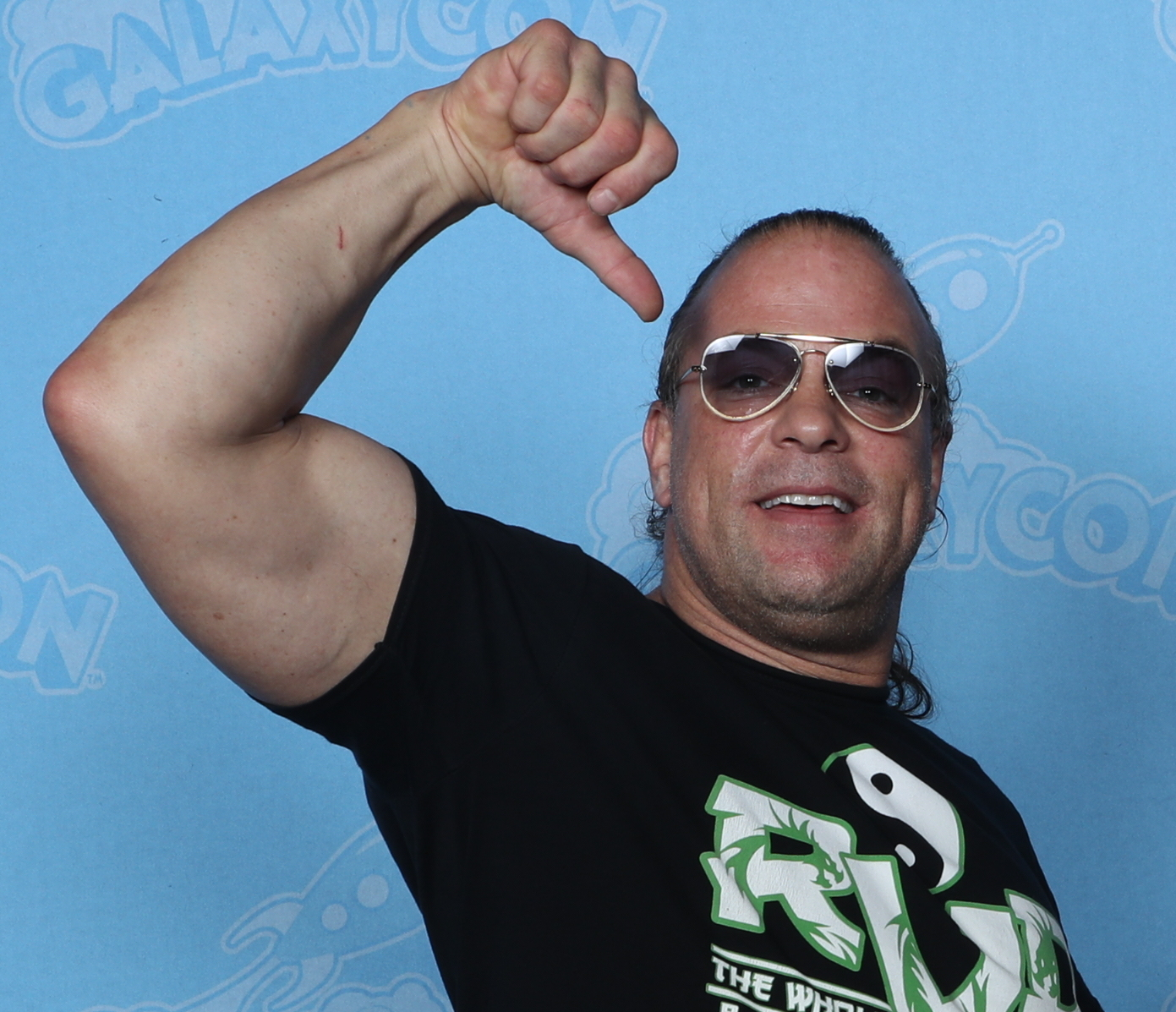
- Van Dam in 2021

Personal information
- Born: Robert Szatkowski; December 18, 1970 (age 55) Battle Creek, Michigan, U.S.
- Spouses: Sonya Delbeck (m. 1998; div. 2018) Katie Forbes (m. 2021)
- Children: 2
- Website: robvandam.com

Professional wrestling career
- Ring name(s): Matt Burn; Rob Szatkowski; Rob Van Dam; Robbie V
- Billed height: 6 ft 0 in (183 cm)
- Billed weight: 235 lb (107 kg)
- Billed from: Battle Creek, Michigan; Los Angeles, California
- Trained by: The Sheik
- Debut: 1990

YouTube information
- Channel: 1 Of A Kind With RVD
- Years active: 2023–present
- Genre: Professional wrestling
- Subscribers: 22.5 thousand
- Views: 1.9 million
- Last updated: October 20, 2026

Robert Szatkowski (born December 18, 1970), better known by his ring name Rob Van Dam (frequently abbreviated to RVD), is an American professional wrestler. He is signed to WWE under a Legends contract. He is also known for his tenures in All Japan Pro Wrestling (AJPW), The National Wrestling Alliance (NWA), World Championship Wrestling (WCW), Extreme Championship Wrestling (ECW), Total Nonstop Action (TNA), Lucha Libre AAA Worldwide (AAA), Pro Wrestling Noah (Noah), All Elite Wrestling (AEW) and Major League Wrestling (MLW).

Known for his unique ring style—which includes his variety of kicks, acrobatic movements—and flexibility, Van Dam gained mainstream popularity in ECW during the latter half of the 1990s. During his time in ECW, he was managed by Bill Alfonso and had feuds with Jerry Lynn and Sabu, also forming a tag team with the latter. They won the ECW World Tag Team Championship twice. On April 4, 1998, Van Dam defeated Bam Bam Bigelow to win the ECW Television Championship, a title he held for 700 days until he vacated the championship due to an injury on March 4, 2000.

When ECW closed in 2001, Van Dam signed a contract with the World Wrestling Federation (WWF, now WWE) and was involved in the Invasion storyline, where several former World Championship Wrestling and ECW wrestlers joined forces against WWF wrestlers. After the Invasion ended, Van Dam wrestled the following years as singles and tag team wrestler, winning the WWE Hardcore Championship, WWE Intercontinental Championship, WWE European Championship, WWE Tag Team Championship and World Tag Team Championships. At WrestleMania 22, Rob Van Dam won the Money in the Bank ladder match. After this victory, he challenged WWE Champion John Cena to a title match at One Night Stand, an ECW-themed PPV. At the event, Van Dam defeated Cena and won his first world championship. Two days later, Paul Heyman awarded Van Dam with the reactivated ECW World Heavyweight Championship making him the only man to hold both titles at the same time.

After leaving WWE in 2007, Van Dam worked on the independent circuit until he signed a contract with Total Nonstop Action Wrestling (TNA) - in 2010. A few months after his debut, he defeated AJ Styles to win the TNA World Championship. He would also appear for Lucha Libre AAA World Wide and challenged Dr. Wagner Jr. for the newly created AAA Latin American Championship at Triplemania XIX, albeit in a losing effort. He remained under contract with TNA until 2013, leaving the company after a run with the TNA X Division Championship. After departing TNA, he returned to WWE, where he worked for one year. Then, he would stay in the independent circuit, also wrestling from 2019 to 2020 with TNA (at the time known as Impact Wrestling). In 2021, he was inducted into the WWE Hall of Fame, and the following year he was inducted into the Hardcore Hall of Fame. Between ECW, WWE and TNA, Van Dam won 21 total championships, including three world championships, and is only one of two wrestlers in history (alongside Bobby Lashley) to have held the WWE, ECW, and TNA world championships.

In addition, he headlined many pay-per-view events throughout three decades between the 1990s and 2010s, including the 1998 edition of November to Remember (ECW's flagship event) and the 2011 edition of TripleMania (AAA's flagship event). In 2002, Van Dam was ranked the number one pro wrestler in the world by Pro Wrestling Illustrated. He was voted "Most Popular Wrestler" by readers of the magazine in 2001 and again in 2002. WWE named him the greatest star in ECW history in 2014.

== Early life ==
Szatkowski grew up in Battle Creek, Michigan, and graduated from Pennfield Senior High School. Szatkowski made his first appearance on WWF television in 1987 in a skit with "The Million Dollar Man" Ted DiBiase. At the time, DiBiase was selecting plants from the audience and offering to pay them to perform degrading acts and offered the 16-year-old Szatkowski $100 to enter the ring and kiss his foot, which he did. This early appearance was later included as a bonus feature on WWE's Before They Were Superstars DVD and on WWE's Rob Van Dam: One of a Kind DVD. He was also in attendance at WrestleMania III as stated on The Hulk Hogan: The Ultimate Anthology DVD.

== Professional wrestling career ==
=== Early career (1990–1992) ===
Szatkowski began training as a wrestler under The Sheik in 1989. He made his wrestling debut in 1990, defeating Dango Nguyen. He wrestled in many independent promotions across Michigan, including the United States Wrestling Association (USWA) and South Atlantic Pro Wrestling (SAPW). In SAPW, he won his first wrestling championship, the SAPW Tag Team Championship, in July 1992 with Chaz Rocco. He also wrestled in several independent promotions across America, and in All Japan Pro Wrestling, where he challenged for the World Junior Heavyweight Championship on several occasions. In the World Wrestling Federation in 1992 he wrestled as an enhancement talent against The Mountie under the ring name Matt Burn.

=== World Championship Wrestling (1992–1993) ===
Szatkowski signed with World Championship Wrestling (WCW) in 1992, and was dubbed "Robbie V" by booker Ron Slinker upon his arrival since Bill Watts did not like the name Rob Van Dam. Robbie V made his WCW debut on the January 23, 1993, episode of WCW Saturday Night as a fan favorite, defeating enhancement talent Pat Rose. The following month, Robbie V entered a tournament for the vacant WCW World Television Championship, defeating Shanghai Pierce in the first round but losing to Vinnie Vegas in the second round, which aired on the March 20 episode of WCW WorldWide. His last televised match was on the May 22 episode of Saturday Night, a tag team loss with Erik Watts against Shanghai Pierce and Tex Slazenger. In February and March 1993, Szatkowski wrestled in Japan for All Japan Pro Wrestling; upon his return to WCW, Ole Anderson had replaced Bill Watts as booker. Szatkowski left WCW in May 1993, feeling he was "lost in the shuffle". and being "jobbed out".

=== All Japan Pro Wrestling (1993–1997) ===
From 1993 to 1997, Van Dam made 10 tours of Japan with All Japan Pro Wrestling (AJPW). While wrestling for AJPW, he was advised by promoter Giant Baba to make himself stand out, which inspired Van Dam to begin airbrushing his singlets. His first tour took place in February and March 1993 as part of the annual Excite Series, where his opponents included Dory Funk Jr., Mighty Inoue and members of the famed Super Generation Army stable such as Mitsuharu Misawa, Toshiaki Kawada, Kenta Kobashi and Tsuyoshi Kikuchi.

Van Dam returned to AJPW in February in March 1994 as part of that year's Excite Series, facing opponents like Jun Akiyama, Yoshinari Ogawa, Masao Inoue, Mighty Inoue, Tamon Honda and the aforementioned members of the Super Generation Army.

Van Dam made a third tour with AJPW in February and March 1995, again as part of the Excite Series, facing opponents including the Can-Am Express, the Holy Demon Army, and the Super Generation Army; during this tour, he teamed with Bobby Bradley as "Aerial Assault". Van Dam returned to AJPW in May and June 1995 as part of the Super Power Series, again facing the Can-Am Express and the Super Generation Army in a series of tag team matches. In his final match of the tour, he unsuccessfully challenged World Junior Heavyweight Champion Danny Kroffat in the Nippon Budokan. He wrestled his fourth tour with AJPW in October 1995 as part of the October Giant Series. Van Dam wrestled his fifth tour of the year with AJPW in November and December 1995 as part of the World's Strongest Tag Determination League, where he teamed with Johnny Smith. Van Dam and Smith finished last out of 10 teams, defeating Jun Akiyama and Takao Omori but losing their other eight matches. He'd also compete in singles matches against opponents like Satoru Asako and Kentaro Shiga

Van Dam returned to AJPW for a sixth tour in February and March 1996 as part of the annual Excite series, again facing the Can-Am Express, Holy Demon Army, and Super Generation Army. He returned for a seventh tour in June and July 1996 as part of the Summer Action Series; during this tour, he teamed with Maunakea Mossman to unsuccessfully challenge Jun Akiyama and Takao Omori for the All Asia Tag Team Championship. In September and October 1996, he made an eighth tour as part of the October Giant Series; during this tour, he unsuccessfully challenged World Junior Heavyweight Champion Tsuyoshi Kikuchi.

Van Dam returned to AJPW for a ninth tour in January 1997 as part of the New Year Giant Series, during which he mainly teamed with Sabu; towards the end of the tour, Van Dam and Sabu unsuccessfully challenged Akiyama and Omori for the All Asia Tag Team Championship in Korakuen Hall. In May and June 1997, Van Dam returned to AJPW for a tenth tour as part of the Super Power Series, during which he unsuccessfully challenged World Junior Heavyweight Champion Yoshinari Ogawa.

=== Extreme Championship Wrestling (1996–2001) ===
==== Rivalry and alliance with Sabu (1996–1998) ====
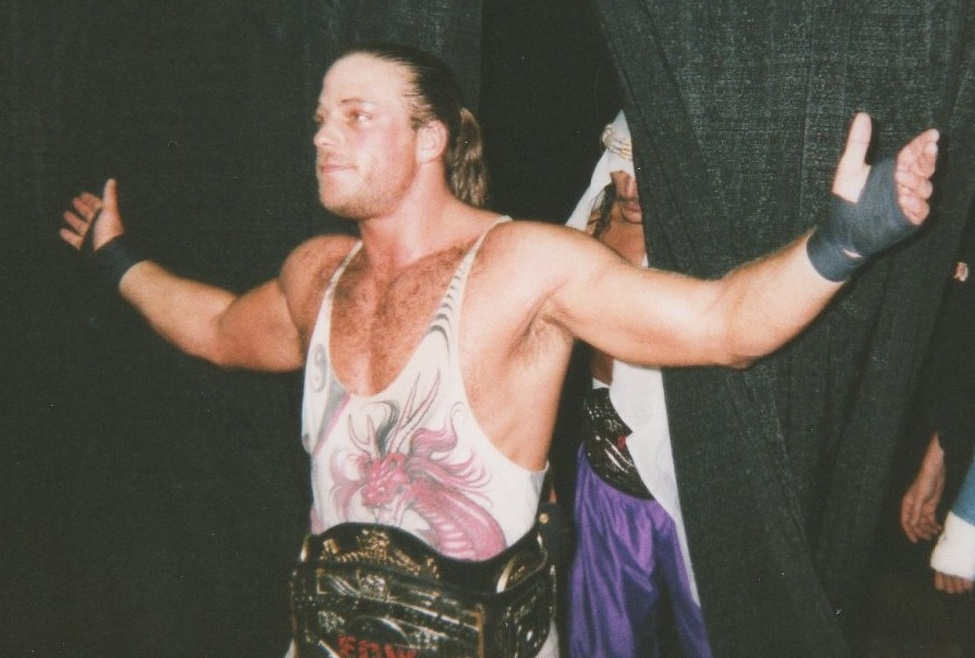
Van Dam as both ECW World Tag Team Champion with Sabu behind him, and ECW World Television Champion, 1998

In early 1996, Van Dam signed with promoter Paul Heyman's Philadelphia-based promotion Extreme Championship Wrestling (ECW), defeating Axl Rotten in his debut match at House Party. Van Dam's mannerisms were those of a stoner, and he became a face due to his laid-back attitude and unorthodox style. On March 30, he faced 2 Cold Scorpio in a match for the World Television Championship. The match ended in a draw with 2 Cold Scorpio retaining the title.

Van Dam gained attention following a series of matches with long-time rival Sabu, which began with a match at Hostile City Showdown, won by Sabu. After the match, Van Dam declined to show proper respect for his opponent, leading to a rematch at A Matter of Respect, which was won by Van Dam. Per the pre-match stipulation, Sabu then offered Van Dam a handshake, but was again ignored. Instead, Van Dam left the ring and turned heel under the management of Bill Alfonso. At Hardcore Heaven, Van Dam faced his rival Sabu once again, in a match to prove who was the better man, but Sabu won the match. The two faced each other yet again in a stretcher match at The Doctor Is In. Van Dam lost the match after missing a Plancha to the outside, hitting the railing and falling onto the stretcher. He was quickly rolled out.

At Natural Born Killaz, Van Dam defeated Doug Furnas in a match. Post-match, Van Dam offered Furnas a handshake, but Furnas instead hit Van Dam with a short-arm clothesline, starting a rivalry between the two. After his rivalry with Furnas expanded to also include Dan Kroffat, Van Dam wanted a tag team partner of his own. After losing to long-time rival Sabu once again at Unlucky Lottery, the two united and formed what was to become one of the most successful tag teams in ECW history. They feuded with Furnas and Kroffat defeating them at When Worlds Collide II and High Incident.

Van Dam and Sabu next feuded with The Eliminators, John Kronus and Perry Saturn. On November 1, the two teams fought to a draw. Van Dam then feuded with Taz, to whom he lost at Holiday Hell via knockout. Sabu and Van Dam continued to feud with The Eliminators for the World Tag Team Championship into 1997. At Crossing the Line Again and Cyberslam, the teams faced off for the ECW World Tag Team Championship in a pair of matches, both of which were won by The Eliminators. At CyberSlam, the two teams faced each other for the title in a Tables, Ladders, and Chairs match, in which The Eliminators again retained their title.

At ECW's first pay-per-view event Barely Legal, Van Dam defeated Lance Storm as a last-minute replacement for the injured Chris Candido. Immediately following the match, Van Dam expressed his distaste for being chosen as a back-up for "some guy who couldn't even lace his boots." Van Dam delivered a speech directed towards Paul Heyman, and not being originally booked on the show was a point of contention between Van Dam and Heyman for a time.

In May 1997, ECW "invaded" the World Wrestling Federation's (WWF) Monday Night Raw television show, drawing the ire of color commentator Jerry Lawler. Lawler then promised he would show up at an ECW show in order to gain revenge, and when he did show up, he had ECW mainstays Van Dam (who turned heel) and Sabu with him. Van Dam made speeches about how he was too good for ECW and deserved to be in one of the "Big Two" (WWF or WCW) on one of their Monday night programs (Monday Night Raw or Monday Nitro). Lawler began to call Van Dam "Mr. Monday Night" on an episode of Monday Night Raw which became a moniker that would stay with Van Dam, changing to suit the day of the week of whichever program was being broadcast. Despite his arrogance and "betrayal" of ECW, over time Van Dam became applauded by fans recognizing his athleticism and unique maneuvers. On the May 12 episode of Monday Night Raw, Van Dam defeated Jeff Hardy. On June 6, Van Dam defeated Flash Funk on Monday Night Raw and teamed with Lawler to defeat the Headbangers on Shotgun Saturday Night. On the June 16 episode of Monday Night Raw, Van Dam and Lawler lost to the Headbangers in a tournament for the vacant WWF World Tag Team Championship.

Van Dam continued to team up with Sabu upon his return to ECW on June 13. Taz's manager Bill Alfonso betrayed Taz and joined Sabu and Van Dam. Van Dam started a new rivalry with Tommy Dreamer, who wanted to gain revenge on Van Dam for his betrayal of ECW. On June 21, Van Dam and Sabu earned a victory over Dreamer and The Sandman. Van Dam and Sabu emerged victorious against Dreamer and Sandman again at Orgy of Violence. At Heat Wave, Van Dam, Sabu, and WWF's Jerry "The King" Lawler fought Dreamer, Sandman, and Rick Rude to a no contest. Van Dam and Dreamer faced each other in a hardcore match at Born to Be Wired, won by Van Dam after he performed a leg drop on Dreamer with a trashcan. Van Dam and Sabu became partners while Dreamer teamed up with Taz. At Fright Fight, Van Dam lost to Dreamer in a flag match. At Ultimate Jeopardy, Van Dam and Sabu faced Dreamer and Taz, a match won by Taz and Dreamer after Dreamer pinned Van Dam. At November to Remember, Van Dam faced Dreamer in another flag match which went to a no contest. At Better Than Ever, Van Dam and Sabu faced Dreamer and Taz in a rematch. This time, Van Dam pinned Dreamer to give the victory to his team and to settle their rivalry. Van Dam's final encounter with Dreamer came on January 5, when Dreamer teamed up with Taz, Al Snow, and Sandman to take on Van Dam, Sabu, Doug Furnas, and Phil Lafon. Van Dam's team lost the match.

In 1998, Van Dam turned face and started a feud with The Triple Threat (Shane Douglas, Bam Bam Bigelow, and Chris Candido). At House Party, Van Dam defeated Bam Bam Bigelow. At Hostile City Showdown, Van Dam and Sabu defeated Axl Rotten and Balls Mahoney by disqualification. The two went on to win a fatal four-way elimination tag team match later that night. At CyberSlam, Van Dam and Sabu lost to World Heavyweight Champion Shane Douglas and Bam Bam Bigelow.

Van Dam's popularity increased when he got his first taste of ECW gold, on April 4 when he defeated Bam Bam Bigelow to win the World Television Championship. Van Dam retained the belt in his first title defense on April 10 against Doug Furnas. Sabu also expressed interest in Van Dam's championship, leading to a title match between the two at Wrestlepalooza. Van Dam retained the title as the match ended in a time limit draw.

At A Matter of Respect, Van Dam and Sabu were forced to face each other in a tag team match as they both teamed up with World Tag Team Champions. Van Dam teamed with the one half of the champions, Lance Storm, while Sabu teamed with the other half, Chris Candido. Van Dam and Sabu reconciled and instead took out Storm and Candido making it a no contest. Van Dam and Sabu started a feud with Storm and Candido in the next month for the tag team title. On June 29, Van Dam and Sabu beat Storm and Candido to win the World Tag Team Championship, which made Van Dam a double champion. On October 24, Sabu and Van Dam lost the title to the Dudley Boyz (Buh Buh Ray and D-Von) after interference from Triple Threat. Van Dam sought revenge and at November to Remember, Van Dam and Sabu teamed with Taz to defeat Triple Threat. On December 13, Van Dam and Sabu won the World Tag Team Championship for a second time by beating the Dudley Boyz in Japan at a Frontier Martial-Arts Wrestling ECW/FMW Supershow.

==== Longest-reigning World Television Champion (1998–2000) ====
Van Dam remained the World Television Champion for the rest of 1998, and he started 1999 by making successful title defenses against the likes of Spike Dudley, Lance Storm at Guilty as Charged, Jerry Lynn at Crossing the Line '99, Balls Mahoney at Anarchy Rulz, and 2 Cold Scorpio at CyberSlam.

Van Dam and Sabu were scheduled to make a title defense on April 17, but Sabu was suspended by ECW before the match occurred. Instead, Van Dam faced D-Von Dudley in a singles match and as a result of losing the match, Van Dam also lost the ECW World Tag Team Championship to the Dudleyz. After losing the tag team titles, Van Dam focused on defending the Television title. He entered into a rivalry with Jerry Lynn against whom he defended the Television title at Hardcore Heaven in a "no time limit" match. Van Dam retained the title, and the match was deemed so good that Paul Heyman aired it on ECW's debut on TNN in place of a shoot promo about TNN that he was planning, but was not allowed to air. Van Dam continued to defend the ECW World Television Championship for the remainder of the year.

Van Dam began a feud with Rhino in the beginning of 2000. Van Dam successfully defended the ECW World Television Championship against Rhino on January 7. Van Dam got a victory during a title defense against Sabu at Guilty as Charged which was Sabu's last match in the promotion. Van Dam was scheduled to perform in a "champion vs. champion" pay-per-view main event against the ECW World Heavyweight Champion Mike Awesome. This match potentially could have been ECW's most lucrative pay-per-view main event, and Heyman was depending on it to bring an influx of badly needed finances, but the match never occurred because Van Dam suffered a broken ankle during a successful title defense against Rhino on January 29. The injury also forced Van Dam to vacate the ECW World Television Championship.

==== Final appearances (2000–2001) ====
Van Dam returned to ECW at Hardcore Heaven on May 14 and faced long-time rival Jerry Lynn. Van Dam was supported by his real-life friend Scotty Anton who eventually turned on him when Van Dam was going to perform a Five-Star Frog Splash on Lynn. Anton pushed him from the top rope, which helped Lynn win the match. Van Dam feuded with Anton and took his revenge at Heat Wave on July 16 by defeating Anton after debuting his new finisher called the "Van Terminator". Van Dam then attempted to exact revenge on Rhino for forcing his injury. He received many opportunities to win the ECW World Television Championship back from Rhino, but Rhino's allies usually attacked Van Dam, causing disqualifications and allowing Rhino to retain the title. At Anarchy Rulz on October 1, Van Dam faced Rhino for the ECW World Television Championship but was screwed when a heel referee made a fast count during a pinfall attempt made by Rhino.

Van Dam was not advertised and did not show for a large number of ECW events due to the large sum of money owed to him. He appeared at ECW's final pay-per-view event Guilty as Charged on January 7, 2001, where he defeated Jerry Lynn. This was Van Dam's last appearance in ECW, as ECW only held two more shows after the pay-per-view.

=== All Japan Pro Wrestling (2001) ===
In February and March 2001, Van Dam returned to All Japan Pro Wrestling for an eleventh tour as part of its "Excite Series". During the tour, Van Dam primarily wrestled in tag team matches, teaming with partners including Danny Kroffat and Gran Naniwa. His opponents during the tour included Giant Kimala and Sabu.

=== World Wrestling Federation / World Wrestling Entertainment (2001–2007) ===
==== The Invasion (2001) ====
Several months after the closure of ECW, Van Dam was signed to a short-term contract by the World Wrestling Federation (WWF). Along with fellow ECW alumnus Tommy Dreamer, Van Dam returned to WWF television on the July 9, 2001, episode of Raw is War in Atlanta, Georgia as a heel, and attacking WWF wrestlers Kane and Chris Jericho. Later that night, five wrestlers from WWF and five wrestlers from WCW took on ten ECW wrestlers, including Van Dam. The match never took place as instead the WCW wrestlers aligned themselves with the ECW wrestlers.

Despite being presented as a heel, Van Dam was popular with the WWF fans, who were aware of his reputation in ECW. After defeating Jeff Hardy for the WWF Hardcore Championship at Invasion on July 22, Van Dam lost the Hardcore Championship to Hardy on the August 13 episode of Raw is War, but regained it at SummerSlam on August 19 in a ladder match. During this time Van Dam had defeated wrestlers such as Kane, The Undertaker, Kurt Angle, Chris Jericho, The Rock and even Alliance leader Stone Cold Steve Austin in singles and tag team matches. Van Dam became one of the most popular members of the Alliance who faced The Rock for the WCW Championship on multiple occasions, and even challenged Alliance leader Stone Cold Steve Austin for the WWF Championship including a triple threat match at No Mercy on October 21 also involving Kurt Angle, but did not win. At Survivor Series on November 18, Van Dam and four other Alliance members faced five WWF wrestlers in a Winner Take All match. Team WWF won, and the members of the Alliance were fired; however, as Van Dam held the Hardcore Championship, he was able to retain his job.

==== Intercontinental Champion and Championship Unifications (2001–2002) ====
Van Dam became a face, but lost the Hardcore Championship to The Undertaker at Vengeance on December 9. Van Dam then entered into a rivalry with William Regal over Regal's WWF Intercontinental Championship. On the February 25, 2002, episode of Raw, Van Dam defeated Lance Storm and Big Show in a triple threat match to become the #1 contender to the Intercontinental Championship. At WrestleMania X8 on March 17, Van Dam faced Regal for the Intercontinental Championship and won the match after he hit Regal with a Five-Star Frog Splash.

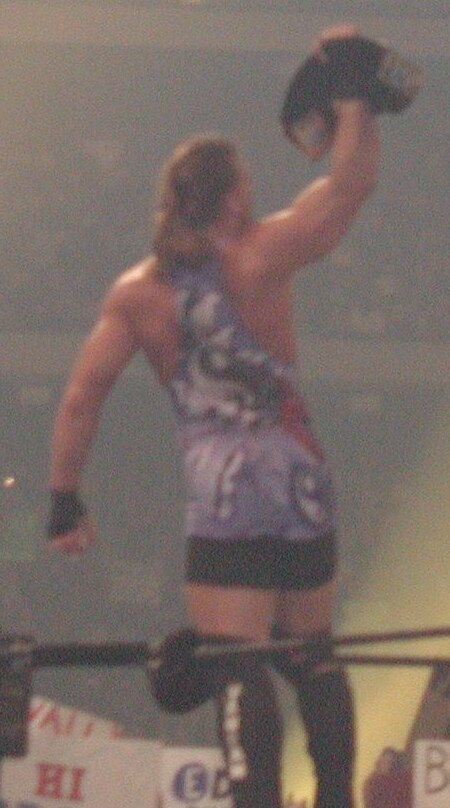
Van Dam after winning the WWF Intercontinental Championship at WrestleMania X8

When the WWF was divided into two "brands", Raw and SmackDown! in 2002, Van Dam was drafted to the Raw brand as the fourth pick, thus bringing the Intercontinental Championship to Raw. On the April 1 episode of Raw, after Van Dam defended his title successfully against Booker T, Eddie Guerrero returned to the WWF and attacked Van Dam. Van Dam started a feud with Guerrero over the Intercontinental Championship. At Backlash on April 21, Van Dam lost the Intercontinental Championship to Guerrero. At Insurrextion on May 4, Van Dam and Guerrero had a rematch for the Intercontinental Championship. Guerrero was disqualified after hitting the referee with the Intercontinental Championship; as a result, Van Dam won the match but not the title because a title cannot change hands by disqualification. At Judgment Day on May 19, Van Dam failed to win the Intercontinental Championship from Guerrero in another rematch. The following night on Raw, Van Dam defeated The Undertaker for the WWE Undisputed Championship but Raw owner Ric Flair restarted the match (due to The Undertaker's foot being on the bottom rope), which Van Dam then lost negating the title win. On the May 27 episode of Raw, Van Dam defeated Guerrero in a ladder match for his second Intercontinental Championship.

After Van Dam faced Brock Lesnar in the final round of the 2002 King of the Ring tournament (which he lost), Van Dam and Lesnar began feuding with each other. Van Dam defended his Intercontinental Championship against Lesnar twice and retained his title both times by disqualification on the June 24 episode of Raw and at Vengeance on July 21. On the July 22 episode of Raw, Van Dam won the WWE European Championship for the first and only time (Note: Van Dam is not recognized by WWE's official list of European Champions on their website, but is in their encyclopedia. Retrospective WWE.com articles have added the European Championship to his resume; it was not mentioned in his WWE.com profile until early 2006.) after he defeated then-European Champion Jeff Hardy in a championship unification ladder match. As a result, the European Championship was deactivated upon being unified with the Intercontinental Championship. On the July 29 episode of Raw, Van Dam lost the Intercontinental Championship to Chris Benoit.

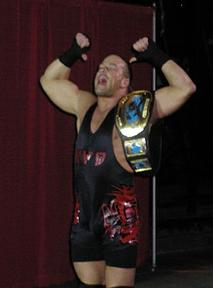
Van Dam as Intercontinental Champion

At SummerSlam on August 25, Van Dam won his third Intercontinental Championship by defeating Benoit in a rematch for the title. As Benoit brought the title to SmackDown! when he switched brands shortly after winning it, Van Dam brought the title back to Raw. On the August 26 episode of Raw, Van Dam won the Hardcore Championship for the fourth and final time after he defeated then-Hardcore Champion Tommy Dreamer in a championship unification hardcore match. As a result, the Hardcore Championship was deactivated upon being unified with the Intercontinental Championship. On the September 9 episode of Raw, Van Dam became the number one contender to the World Heavyweight Championship by defeating Chris Jericho, Jeff Hardy, and Big Show in a fatal four-way elimination match.

Van Dam started feuding with the World Heavyweight Champion Triple H. On the September 16 episode of Raw, Van Dam lost the Intercontinental Championship to Chris Jericho after interference by Triple H. At Unforgiven on September 22, Van Dam faced Triple H for the World Heavyweight Championship. Due to Ric Flair's interference, Van Dam lost the match. At No Mercy on October 20, Van Dam got his revenge on Flair by defeating him. At Survivor Series on November 17, Van Dam participated in the first-ever Elimination Chamber match for Triple H's World Heavyweight Championship, but it was won by Shawn Michaels. During the match, Van Dam performed a Five-Star Frog Splash off of one of the pods/chambers onto Triple H, and accidentally landed his knee onto Triple H's throat.

==== Teaming and feuding with Kane (2002–2003) ====
Van Dam appeared on the World Heavyweight Championship scene and also formed a tag team with Kane in October. Van Dam defeated Jericho and Booker T in a Triple Threat match to become the number one contender for the World Heavyweight Championship. On the November 25 episode of Raw, Van Dam faced Michaels for the World Heavyweight Championship. Michaels was disqualified after Triple H hit Van Dam with a Pedigree. On the December 2 episode of Raw, Van Dam lost to Triple H in a #1 contender's match with World Heavyweight Champion Shawn Michaels acting as the special guest referee.

Van Dam continued to team up with Kane. Van Dam participated in the Royal Rumble on January 19, 2003, and was one of the final five participants before being tricked and eliminated by Kane. The two faced Lance Storm and William Regal at No Way Out on February 23 for the World Tag Team Championship but failed to win the titles when Kane mistakenly chokeslammed Van Dam. On the March 31 episode of Raw, Van Dam and Kane defeated World Tag Team Champions Lance Storm and Chief Morley and The Dudley Boyz in a 3-way elimination tag team match to win the World Tag Team Championship. At Backlash on April 27, Van Dam and Kane retained the titles against The Dudley Boyz with Morley as the special guest referee. At Insurrextion on June 7, Van Dam and Kane defended the World Tag Team Championship successfully against La Résistance, before losing the titles to La Résistance at Bad Blood on June 15.

After Kane was forced to take his mask off when he lost a World Heavyweight Championship match to Triple H on the June 23 episode of Raw, he turned heel by chokeslamming Van Dam, and the team dissolved. The two then started feuding with each other. On the August 18 episode of Raw, Van Dam faced Christian for the WWE Intercontinental Championship, but Kane interfered in the match and knocked Van Dam out after hitting him with a chair. Kane then took Van Dam to the backstage area and was about to set him on fire. Kane changed his mind at the last minute, however, and said that he was not going to do what "they" wanted. Their rivalry led to a No Holds Barred match at SummerSlam on August 24, which Kane won. On the September 8 episode of Raw, the rivalry ended when Kane defeated Van Dam in a steel cage match. Kane threw Van Dam through the steel cage by mistake (causing Van Dam to win), but Eric Bischoff came out and restarted the match, saying Van Dam did not escape through the door or climb out of the cage and ordered the referees to put Van Dam back inside the cage where Kane eventually hit a chokeslam from the side of the cage to pick up the victory.

==== Championship reigns (2003–2005) ====
In September, Van Dam started feuding with both Christian and Chris Jericho over Christian's Intercontinental Championship. On the September 15 episode of Raw, Van Dam faced Jericho in a number one contender's match for the title. The match ended in a double disqualification when Intercontinental Champion Christian interfered and hit both men with the title belt. At Unforgiven on September 21 in a triple threat match between Jericho, Christian, and Van Dam, Christian retained his title. Van Dam, however, defeated Christian in a ladder match on the September 29 episode of Raw to win the Intercontinental Championship for a fourth time. Van Dam entered into a rivalry with Chris Jericho in October, and the two faced each other in several tag team matches. On the October 27 episode of Raw, Van Dam lost the Intercontinental Championship to Jericho. Van Dam reached the ropes when the challenger had him in the Walls of Jericho, but Raw Co-General Manager Eric Bischoff distracted the referee while Jericho dragged Van Dam back into the middle of the ring. Van Dam submitted and Jericho became the new champion. Raw Co-General Manager Stone Cold Steve Austin came out and immediately ordered Jericho to face Van Dam in a rematch inside the Steel Cage for the title. Van Dam won the rematch and his fifth Intercontinental Championship.

At Survivor Series on November 16, Van Dam was pinned by Randy Orton during the traditional elimination match between Team Austin and Team Bischoff that Van Dam's team would lose. As a result, Orton and Van Dam started feuding with each other over Van Dam's Intercontinental title. Van Dam lost the Intercontinental Championship to Orton at Armageddon on December 14 after interference from Ric Flair. Van Dam went on to feud with both Orton and Evolution. On the January 12, 2004, episode of Raw, Van Dam faced Orton in a rematch for the Intercontinental Championship but lost the match.

Van Dam formed a tag team with Booker T. The two teamed for the first time on the January 19 episode of Raw when they defeated Christian and Matt Hardy to qualify for a battle royal where the winner of the Battle Royal would get the #30 spot in the 2004 Royal Rumble match on January 25. On the February 16 episode of Raw, Booker T and Van Dam defeated Evolution members Ric Flair and Batista to win the World Tag Team Championship. At WrestleMania XX on March 14, Booker T and Van Dam defended the World Tag Team Championship in a fatal four-way elimination tag team match against the Dudley Boyz, La Résistance, and the team of Mark Jindrak and Garrison Cade. On the March 22 episode of Raw, Booker T and Van Dam lost the World Tag Team Championship back to Flair and Batista.

On March 22, Van Dam was drafted to the SmackDown! brand. He made his SmackDown! debut on March 25 defeating Charlie Haas. Van Dam and Rey Mysterio began a feud with the Dudley Boyz, defeating them at Judgment Day on May 16. In June, Van Dam left the tag team division and began a pursuit for the United States Championship. At The Great American Bash on June 27, John Cena defended the title against Van Dam, Booker T, and René Duprée in a Fatal Four-Way match and retained his championship. On the July 1 episode of SmackDown!, Van Dam and Duprée lost to Booker T in a number one contender's Triple Threat match. Four weeks later, Van Dam participated in an 8-way elimination match for the vacant United States Championship, and was the last man to be eliminated by eventual winner Booker T.

Van Dam began teaming up with Mysterio again in the summer and feuded with René Duprée and Kenzo Suzuki. At No Mercy on October 3, Van Dam and Mysterio failed to win the WWE Tag Team Championship from Dupree and Suzuki. On the December 9 episode of SmackDown!, Van Dam and Mysterio defeated Duprée and Suzuki to win the WWE Tag Team Championship, and retained the title in a rematch at Armageddon on December 12. In January 2005, Van Dam suffered a knee injury. To explain his absence, the Basham Brothers (Doug and Danny) defeated Mysterio and Van Dam for the WWE Tag Team Championship, in a Fatal Four-Way elimination tag team match on the January 13 episode of SmackDown!, "injuring" Van Dam in the process. On January 27, Van Dam underwent reconstructive knee surgery under Dr. James Andrews to repair a torn anterior cruciate ligament and meniscus.

==== WWE Champion and ECW Champion (2005–2006) ====
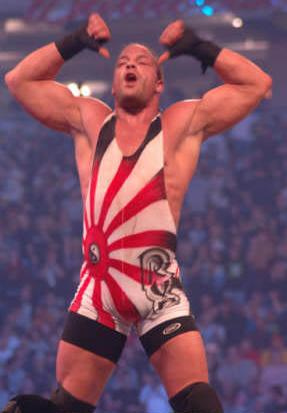
Van Dam during his ring entrance at WrestleMania 23

While recuperating, Van Dam made an appearance at the ECW reunion pay-per-view ECW One Night Stand on June 12. Accompanied by his former manager Bill Alfonso and sporting a knee brace, Van Dam delivered a worked shoot promo, standing up for ECW and criticizing the way he had been booked in WWE, until he was attacked by Rhyno. He was saved by Sabu, who defeated Rhyno in an impromptu match. Despite his injury, Van Dam got physically involved in the match, hitting Rhyno with a chairshot and giving him a Chair Surf. On the June 27 episode of Raw, Van Dam, while still healing, was drafted to the Raw brand in the 2005 draft lottery. He was introduced to Raw by Carlito, who insulted Van Dam before attacking him and assaulting his knee. Van Dam made his return to the ring over seven months later at the Royal Rumble on January 29, 2006. He gained revenge on Carlito by eliminating him, but was in turn inadvertently eliminated by Rey Mysterio in the final moments. On the February 6 episode of Raw, Van Dam defeated Carlito in the first round of the Road to WrestleMania Tournament to determine the number one contender to the WWE Championship, but lost in the final round to Triple H, in a triple threat match, which also featured Big Show. Later, Van Dam defeated Trevor Murdoch to qualify for the Money in the Bank ladder match at WrestleMania 22 on April 2. Van Dam went on to win the match, thus earning himself a guaranteed shot at either the WWE Championship or World Heavyweight Championship at any time within the subsequent year.

Following the ladder match, Shelton Benjamin challenged Van Dam to put his Money in the Bank opportunity on the line in a match. Van Dam countered by requesting a match for Benjamin's Intercontinental Championship. One week later, both Van Dam and Benjamin picked mystery opponents for one another, with the loser placing their respective prize on the line in a bout at Backlash on April 30. Benjamin lost to the returning Charlie Haas, while Van Dam was defeated by all five members of the Spirit Squad. As a result, both the Intercontinental Championship and the Money in the Bank title shot were contested at Backlash. Van Dam went on to win the former, before dropping the Intercontinental Championship back to Benjamin on the May 15 episode of Raw.

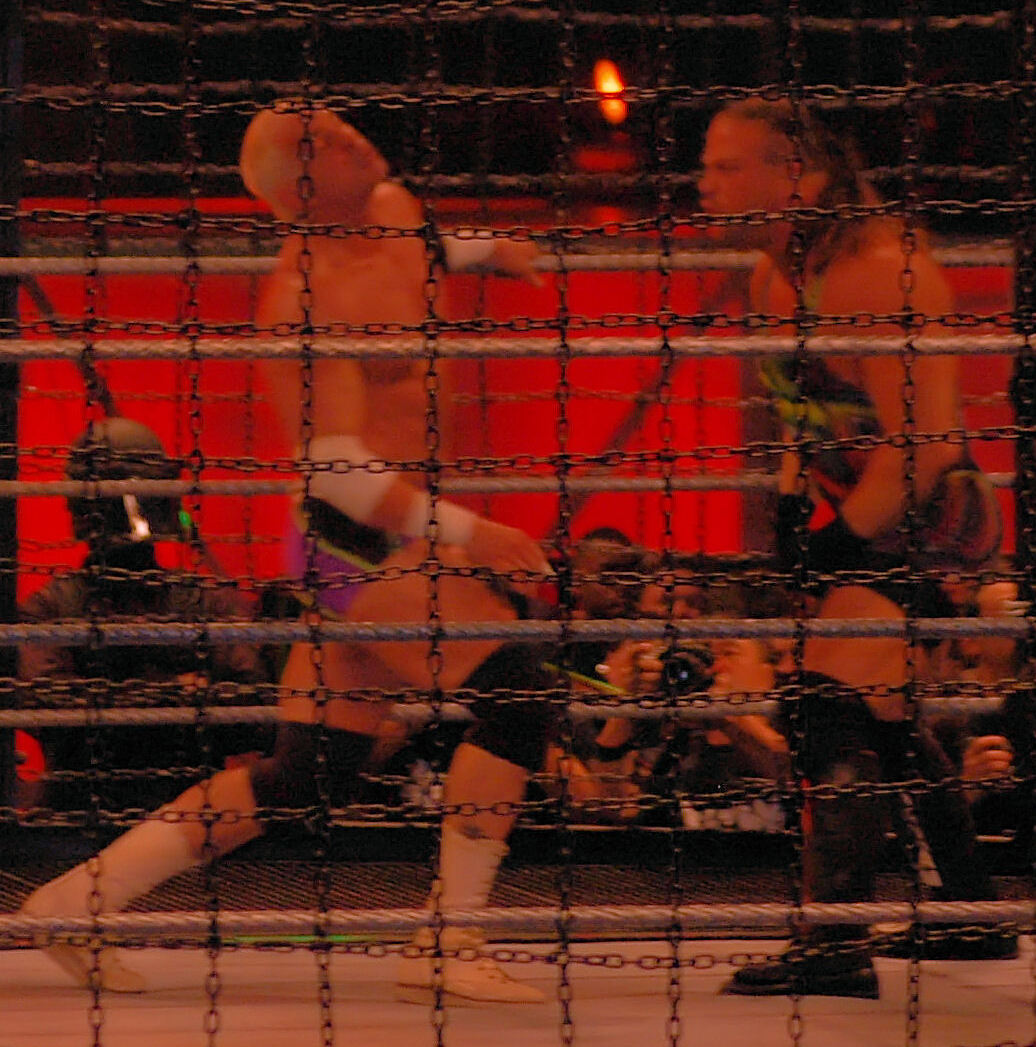
Van Dam (right) facing Hardcore Holly in the Extreme Elimination Chamber at December to Dismember

On May 29, Van Dam was selected by Paul Heyman to be drafted to WWE's new ECW brand. At ECW One Night Stand on June 11, Van Dam cashed in his Money in the Bank contract and defeated John Cena to win the WWE Championship. After two referees were knocked out, Edge appeared from underneath the ring to attack Cena, spearing him through a table. Van Dam then hit a Five Star Frog Splash and the pinfall was counted by Paul Heyman, who suddenly ran down the aisle. On the following episode of Raw, Vince McMahon confirmed that the title change was official due to the match being held under "extreme rules". For the past few weeks, Heyman had hinted that the WWE Championship would be "rechristened" the ECW World Heavyweight Championship when Van Dam won. On the debut of ECW, Van Dam was awarded the reinstated ECW World Heavyweight Championship by Heyman and decided to defend the WWE Championship separately and simultaneously, joking that "this one spins", becoming the first wrestler in history to hold both the WWE Championship and the ECW World Heavyweight Championship as well as the only one to hold them at the same time, making him a double world champion. He would become the 15th WWE Triple Crown Champion as a result of his WWE Championship win.

At Vengeance on June 25, Van Dam defeated Edge to retain the WWE Championship. Two nights later on ECW, Van Dam defeated Kurt Angle to retain the ECW World Heavyweight Championship. On the July 3 episode of Raw, Van Dam lost the WWE Championship to Edge in a triple threat match that also featured John Cena. The next night on the July 4 episode of ECW, he lost the ECW World Heavyweight Championship to Big Show after Heyman turned on him. Later on WWE.com, Heyman suspended Van Dam for 30 days without giving a reason (in reality, WWE suspended Van Dam for 30 days as a result of his recent drug possession arrest).

He returned to television on the August 8 episode of ECW, attacking both Sabu and Kurt Angle during a match. His return to the ring came a week later, in a losing effort to Sabu in a ladder match for number one contendership to the now renamed ECW World Championship. Van Dam slowly worked his way back into the championship picture. On the October 24 episode of ECW, Van Dam defeated Big Show in a non-title ladder match to regain the number one contendership. Having the option to pick a date for the title, Van Dam announced the title match would occur at December to Dismember on December 3. However, Heyman had the option of picking the match type and announced that the main event would be a six-man Extreme Elimination Chamber match. At December to Dismember, Van Dam was the third participant eliminated. Later in December, Van Dam once again earned the number one contendership to the ECW World Championship, but this time by a fan poll. Van Dam got three matches against ECW World Champion Bobby Lashley, coming up short each time.

==== The ECW Originals (2006–2007) ====
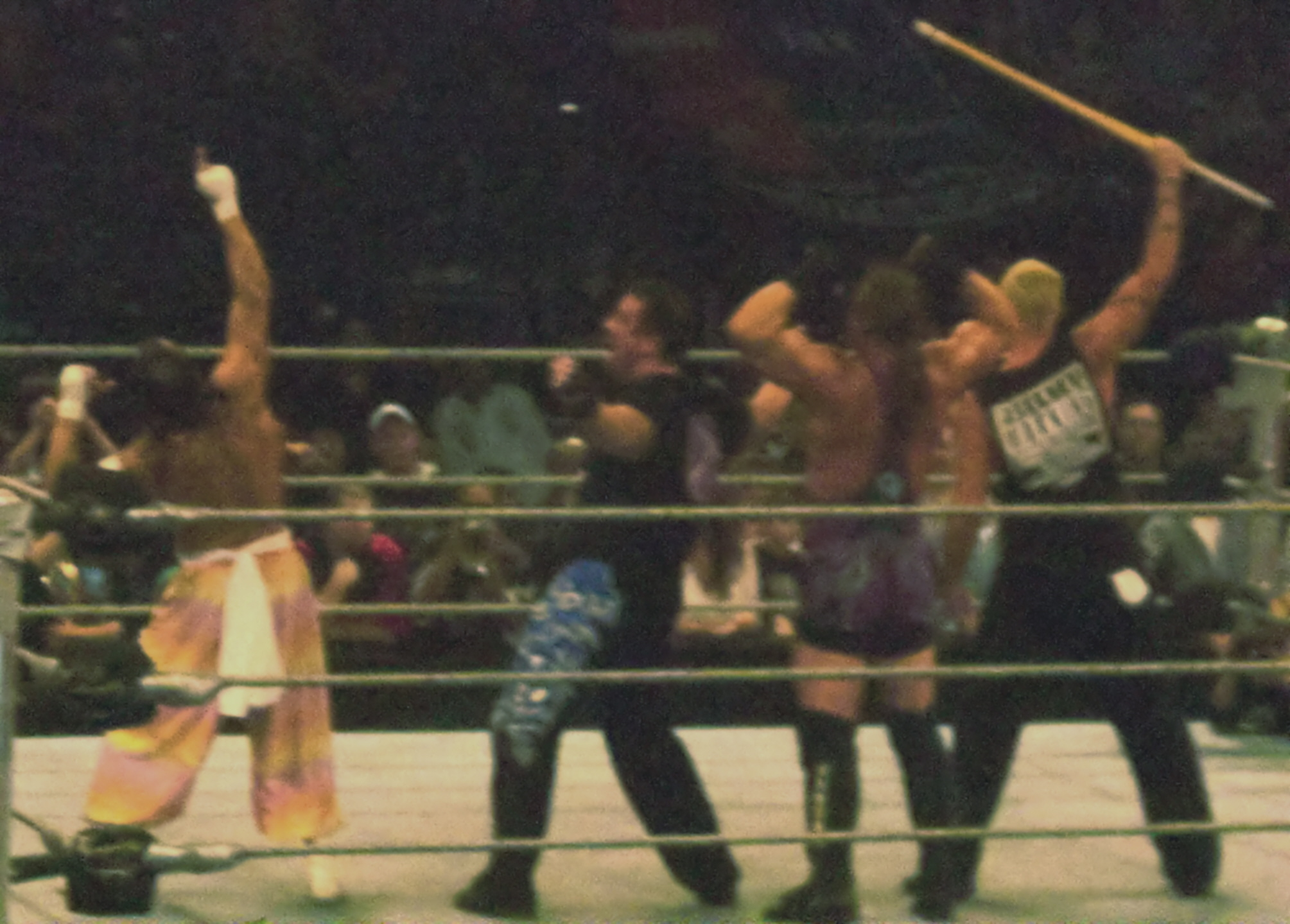
Sabu, Tommy Dreamer, Van Dam and The Sandman (ECW Originals) performing their signature poses

Van Dam later joined the ECW Originals along with Sabu, Tommy Dreamer, and The Sandman. The ECW Originals began a feud with the New Breed (Elijah Burke, Kevin Thorn, Marcus Cor Von, and Matt Striker). The two teams faced off at WrestleMania 23 on April 1, 2007 in a match which the ECW Originals won. After Vince McMahon won the ECW World Championship at Backlash on April 29, Van Dam and the other ECW Originals made statements on WWE.com about McMahon killing ECW. On the May 1 episode of ECW, the ECW Originals all competed in a fatal four-way match to decide who would take on McMahon the next week in a title match, which Van Dam won after a five-star frog splash on Sandman. Van Dam, however, had to face McMahon, Shane McMahon, and Umaga in a 3-on-1 handicap match, which Van Dam was unable to win.

Van Dam received a concussion during a match with Randy Orton on the May 28 episode of Raw. Orton further attacked Van Dam after the match due to the comments Van Dam made on WWE.com about the lack of respect Orton displayed towards Shawn Michaels, who also suffered a concussion at the hands of Orton. Van Dam once again faced Orton at One Night Stand on June 3, this time in a Stretcher match. Although it looked as if Orton was going to win again, Van Dam gave him a roundhouse kick to the head and was able to push the stretcher across the line for the win. Despite winning the match, Orton continued to attack Van Dam, ending with an elevated DDT off the barricade and onto the concrete floor, in which Van Dam was carried out on a stretcher. After the match, Van Dam left WWE due to being burnt out and needing time away.

=== Return to the independent circuit (2007–2010) ===
The day after Van Dam's WWE contract expired, he was in the United Kingdom on a promotional tour and to record scenes for the wrestling documentary, Bloodstained Memoirs. He also took part in interviews for the BBC.

Van Dam defeated Booker T at Pro Wrestling Alliance Christmas Chaos on December 28, 2007, in Pasadena, Texas.

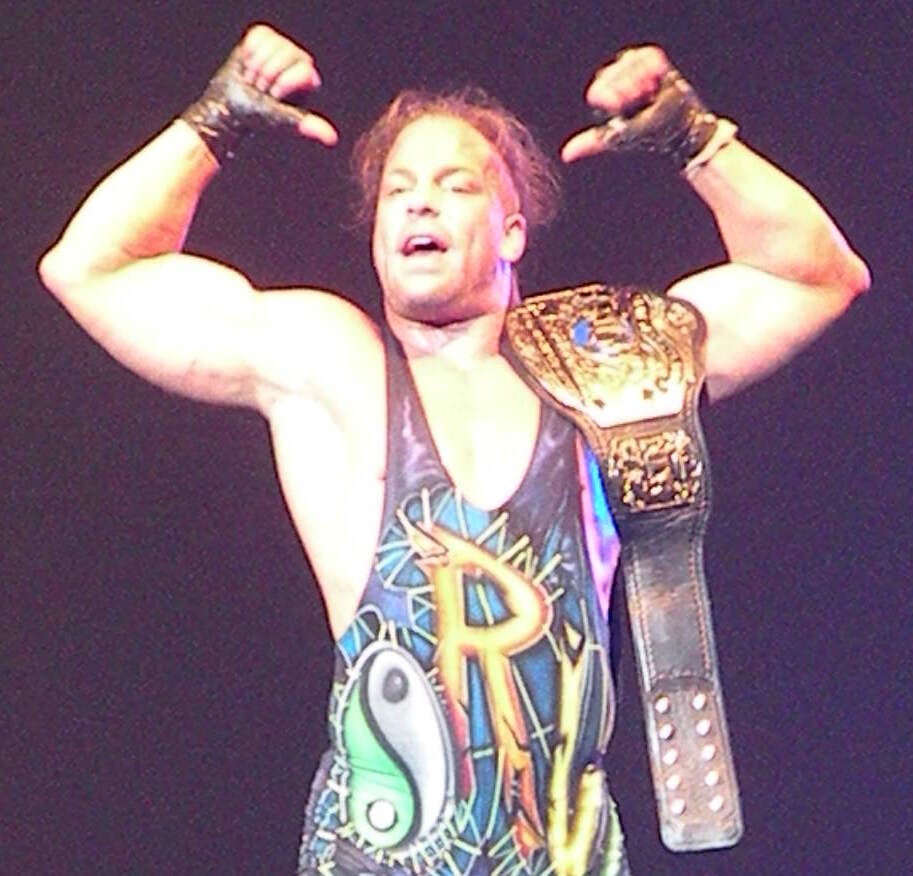
Van Dam as No Limits Wrestling (NLW) Champion at American Wrestling Rampage

In an interview with the Baltimore Sun, Van Dam stated that while WWE would be the first choice and that he would definitely talk to them, he would definitely consider Total Nonstop Action Wrestling (TNA) if he returned full-time to pro wrestling. While not under contract, Van Dam made an unannounced return on WWE's 15th Anniversary Raw in December 2007, squashing Santino Marella with a Five-Star Frog Splash. He made a similarly unannounced appearance as a participant in the 2009 Royal Rumble, which he failed to win as he was eliminated by Chris Jericho.

He returned to the independent circuit by competing for Associação Portuguesa de Wrestling (APW) in February 2008. He then also appeared for Nu-Wrestling Evolution (NWE) throughout countries such as Spain. On August 14, 2008, he won a triple threat match at the Inoki Genome Federation (IGF) in Japan after defeating Kendo Kashin and Necro Butcher.

On March 9, 2009, it was announced that Van Dam would be competing in American Wrestling Rampage (AWR) on their European Tour, during which he won the promotion's No Limits Wrestling (NLW) Championship in a three way bout versus Sabu and former champion Shawn Maxer. He lost the title to René Duprée after three successful defenses. In November he regained the title, renamed the AWR World Heavyweight Championship at this point, from Duprée on November 29 winning two decisions in a Two Out of Three Falls match. On September 11, 2009, in the World Stars of Wrestling (WSW) European Championship events in Portimão, Portugal, Van Dam won the WSW World Championship, by defeating Joe E. Legend. On the following night he defended his newly won title against Lance Cade.

On January 30, 2010, Van Dam made his debut for Pro Wrestling Guerrilla (PWG) as part of WrestleReunion 4, defeating Chris Hero and Roderick Strong in a "Sky High" three-way match.

=== Total Nonstop Action Wrestling (2010–2013) ===
==== TNA World Heavyweight Champion and EV 2.0 (2010–2011) ====
On March 8, 2010, Van Dam made his debut for Total Nonstop Action Wrestling (TNA) at the promotion's Monday night episode of Impact!, defeating Sting. Then just seconds after his debut victory Sting attacked him and later Hulk Hogan with his signature baseball bat. Van Dam got his revenge on Sting the following week by attacking him during his entrance. Van Dam teamed with Jeff Hardy in a tag team match, where they defeated Beer Money, Inc. (Robert Roode and James Storm) on the March 22 episode of Impact!. The following week the two of them teamed with Eric Young and defeated The Band (Kevin Nash, Scott Hall and Syxx-Pac) in a six-man tag team steel cage match. At Lockdown on April 18, both Van Dam and Hardy became members of Team Hogan (joining Abyss and Jeff Jarrett) for the annual Lethal Lockdown match, where they defeated Team Flair (Sting, Desmond Wolfe, Robert Roode and James Storm).

The night after Lockdown he first defeated Jeff Hardy in a number one contender's match and then, in the main event of the evening, A.J. Styles to become the new TNA World Heavyweight Champion. After succeeding in his first televised title defense against Desmond Wolfe, Styles attacked Van Dam, announcing the invocation of the rematch clause for Sacrifice on May 16. At Sacrifice Van Dam defeated Styles in a rematch. The following month at Slammiversary VIII on June 13 Van Dam retained his title against Sting in a rematch of his TNA debut. Van Dam defeated Abyss, Jeff Hardy and Mr. Anderson in a four-way match to retain the TNA World Heavyweight Championship at Victory Road on July 11. On the following episode of Impact! Van Dam aligned himself with fellow ECW alumni Tommy Dreamer, Raven, Stevie Richards, Rhino, Brother Devon, Pat Kenney, Al Snow and Mick Foley, who saved him from a beating at the hands of Abyss.

The following week, TNA president Dixie Carter agreed to give the ECW alumni their own reunion pay–per–view event, Hardcore Justice on August 8. At Hardcore Justice, Van Dam defeated former tag team partner and rival Sabu in a non-title Hardcore Rules match, after his originally planned match with Jerry Lynn was scrapped due to Lynn suffering a back injury. After successfully defending the TNA World Heavyweight Championship against Abyss in a Stairway to Janice match on the following special edition of Impact!, named The Whole F'n Show, Van Dam and the other former ECW wrestlers were assaulted by Abyss and Fourtune. In the attack Van Dam suffered multiple serious storyline injuries at the hands of Abyss including the need for stitches, spinal trauma and possible acute brain damage, which would force him to vacate the TNA World Heavyweight Championship on August 10 at the taping of the August 19 episode of Impact!. In reality, Van Dam was running out of dates per year on his contract and was therefore taken off television.

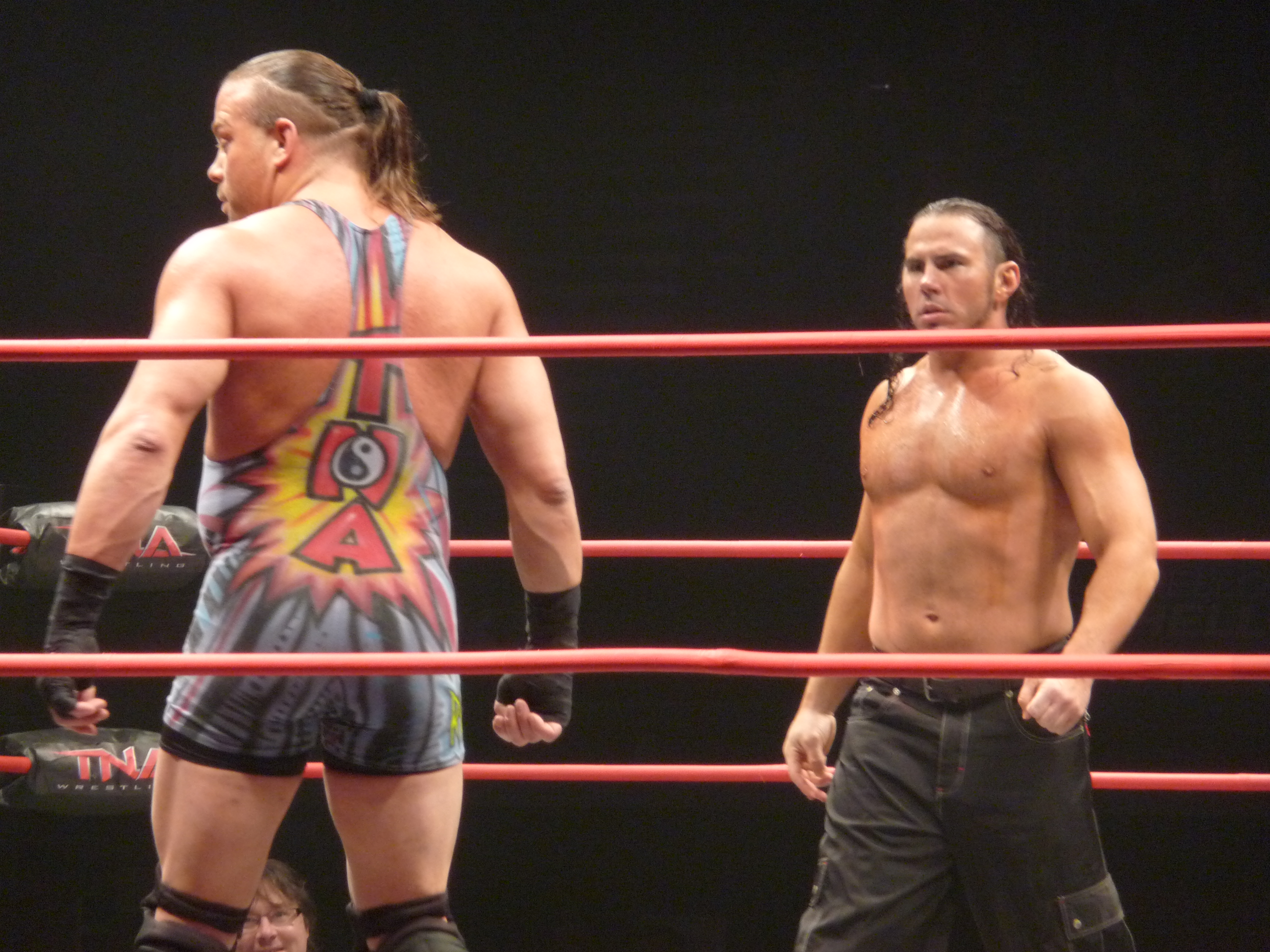
Van Dam (left) taking on Matt Hardy in 2011

Van Dam returned via telephone interview on the September 16 episode of Impact! and announced that he would return to the Impact! Zone the following week, against his doctor's orders. Van Dam returned the following week, confronting Abyss and demanding a match against him at Bound for Glory on October 10, which Eric Bischoff agreed to give him. At Bound for Glory Van Dam defeated Abyss in a Monster's Ball match. At the end of Bound for Glory it was revealed that Hulk Hogan and Eric Bischoff had sent Abyss after Van Dam in order to get the TNA World Heavyweight Championship on their own representative, Jeff Hardy. Van Dam confronted the group, later named Immortal, after Hardy had won the TNA World Heavyweight Championship, only to get hit with the title belt. On the October 21 episode of Impact! Bischoff claimed that someone from EV 2.0 had been calling him, trying to get to be a part of Immortal, which led to Van Dam getting paranoid about his stablemates, first accusing Raven of being the traitor. Later, he and Sabu were defeated in a tag team match by Beer Money, Inc., after Sabu accidentally hit him with a chair. After the match Van Dam and Sabu began shoving each other and had to be separated from each other by the rest of EV 2.0. After two more weeks of dissension between Van Dam and the rest of EV 2.0, Tommy Dreamer challenged him to a match at Turning Point on November 7. At Turning Point Van Dam defeated Dreamer and afterwards made peace with him. On the following episode of Impact! Rhino turned heel by attacking Van Dam and Dreamer, revealing himself as the traitor Van Dam had been looking for. At Final Resolution on December 5 Van Dam defeated Rhino in a First Blood match.

==== Championship pursuits (2011–2012) ====
On January 4, 2011, Van Dam traveled to Japan with other TNA wrestlers to take part New Japan Pro-Wrestling's (NJPW) fifth annual Wrestle Kingdom in Tokyo Dome, where he defeated Toru Yano in a hardcore match. At Genesis on January 9, Van Dam was defeated by Immortal's surprise opponent, the debuting Matt Hardy, when referee Jackson James missed Van Dam's foot under the ropes, thus failing to earn a shot at his brother Jeff's TNA World Heavyweight Championship. During the main event Van Dam prevented Matt from interfering in Jeff's match with Mr. Anderson, which led to Jeff losing the title. The following month at Against All Odds on February 13, Van Dam defeated Matt Hardy in a rematch. On the following episode of Impact!, Van Dam finally received his shot at Jeff Hardy and the TNA World Heavyweight Championship, but was unable to regain the title. On March 13 at Victory Road, Van Dam wrestled Mr. Anderson to a double countout in a TNA World Heavyweight Championship number one contender's match. On April 17 at Lockdown, Van Dam failed in his attempt to regain the TNA World Heavyweight Championship from Sting in a three–way steel cage match, which also included Anderson. The following month at Sacrifice on May 15, Van Dam again failed to regain the title, this time in a singles match with Sting.

Van Dam represented TNA at Mexican promotion AAA's Triplemanía XIX pay-per-view on June 18, 2011. In the main event of the show, Van Dam was defeated by Dr. Wagner, Jr. in a match to determine the first ever AAA Latin American Champion. At Destination X on July 10, Van Dam defeated longtime rival Jerry Lynn in a singles match. On August 7 at Hardcore Justice, Van Dam, at the time ranked number two in the Bound for Glory Series, faced Crimson, ranked number one, in a tournament match. Van Dam lost the match via disqualification, when Jerry Lynn entered the ring, costing him not only the match, but also several places in the tournament's standings. Lynn cost Van Dam another Bound for Glory Series match against A.J. Styles in similar fashion on the August 18 Impact Wrestling. Lynn turned on Van Dam on the September 1 Impact Wrestling, costing him his match with Gunner and, in the process, eliminating him from the finals of the Bound for Glory Series. The following week Lynn explained his turn by claiming that he was tired of being in Van Dam's shadow. Van Dam defeated Lynn in a Full Metal Mayhem match at Bound for Glory on October 16.

On the October 27 episode of Impact Wrestling, Van Dam defeated Christopher Daniels by disqualification after Daniels hit him with a toolbox. Two weeks later, Van Dam prevented Daniels from using a screwdriver to illegally defeat A.J. Styles in a singles match which would cost Daniels the match. At Turning Point on November 13, Van Dam defeated Daniels in a No Disqualification match. In retaliation, Daniels cost him his match for the TNA Television Championship against Robbie E on the December 1 episode of Impact Wrestling. Van Dam defeated Daniels at Final Resolution on December 11 again to end their feud.

After wrestling to a double countout on the January 5, 2012, edition of Impact Wrestling, Gunner made a failed attempt to piledrive Van Dam into the concrete floor after Van Dam back body dropped him onto it. On January 8 at Genesis, Van Dam was defeated by Gunner and was afterwards stretchered backstage, after taking a DDT onto the concrete floor. After a near three-month absence Van Dam resumed working live events in late March. Van Dam returned to Impact Wrestling on April 12, being revealed as the fifth member of Garett Bischoff's team at Lockdown on April 15. At Lockdown, Team Garett defeated a team led by Eric Bischoff. On the following episode of Impact Wrestling, Van Dam defeated Jeff Hardy and Mr. Anderson in a three-way match to become the number one contender to the TNA World Heavyweight Championship. Van Dam received his title opportunity in a ladder match on May 13 at Sacrifice, but was defeated by the defending champion, Bobby Roode. At Slammiversary on June 10, Van Dam was defeated by Mr. Anderson in a three-way number one contender's match, also involving Jeff Hardy. Later that week on Impact Wrestling, Van Dam entered the 2012 Bound for Glory Series. At Hardcore Justice on August 12, Van Dam defeated Magnus and Mr. Anderson in a Falls Count Anywhere match. He wrestled his final match in the tournament on the September 6 Impact Wrestling, losing to Bully Ray, thus finishing fifth and narrowly missing the semifinals of the tournament. On the October 4 episode of Impact Wrestling, Van Dam unsuccessfully challenged Samoa Joe for the TNA Television Championship.

==== X Division Champion (2012–2013) ====
The following week, Van Dam was allowed to pick his opponent for Bound for Glory on October 14 and opted to challenge Zema Ion for the TNA X Division Championship. Van Dam defeated Ion to win the X Division Championship for the first time at Bound for Glory. On the October 25 Impact Wrestling, Van Dam made his first successful title defense, defeating Ion in a rematch. Following the win, he would be attacked by Matt Morgan and Joey Ryan. The following week, Van Dam was defeated by Ryan in a non-title match after an interference from Matt Morgan. Afterwards, he would again be attacked by Morgan. On November 11 at Turning Point, Van Dam defeated Ryan to retain the X Division Championship, after which, he would be attacked by Matt Morgan for the third consecutive time. Four days later on Impact Wrestling, he successfully defended the title against Kid Kash. Van Dam retained the X Division Championship against Austin Aries on November 29 after losing to him via disqualification, following interference from Bully Ray.

Van Dam made another successful title defense on December 9 at Final Resolution, defeating Kenny King. On the following episode of Impact Wrestling, Van Dam lost a non-title match to King, when King pinned him with his feet on the ropes. On January 13, 2013, at Genesis, Van Dam defeated Christian York to retain the X Division Championship. On the February 7 episode of Impact Wrestling, Van Dam successfully defended the X Division Championship against Kenny King and Zema Ion in a three-way match. Two weeks later, Van Dam defeated King again to retain his title. Van Dam lost the X Division Championship to King on the February 28 Impact Wrestling, ending Van Dam's reign at 137 days. In March 2013, Van Dam's TNA contract expired and he did an interview about his future with TNA, stating that he would return to television in WWE or TNA, saying that he was negotiating with both companies. According to Van Dam, he lost his passion for professional wrestling during his work in TNA due to the attitude of his coworkers.

=== Return to WWE (2013–2014) ===
On June 16, 2013, at Payback, it was announced that Van Dam would be returning at Money in the Bank as one of the participants in the WWE Championship Money in the Bank ladder match along with Christian, CM Punk, Daniel Bryan, Randy Orton, and Sheamus, however, the match was ultimately won by Orton on July 14. In his first singles match for the company since 2007, Van Dam defeated Chris Jericho the following night on Raw. He would then go on a short winning streak defeating the likes of Darren Young, Fandango and Wade Barrett which would lead to a United States Championship opportunity against Dean Ambrose on the SummerSlam pre-show on August 18 which Van Dam would win via disqualification which meant Ambrose retained the title. Van Dam was then put in a feud with the then-World Heavyweight Champion Alberto Del Rio, including Del Rio's personal announcer Ricardo Rodriguez becoming Van Dam's announcer, facing Del Rio at Night of Champions on September 15 (winning via disqualification) and Battleground on October 6, but he could not win the title. After this match, Van Dam left the WWE after his 90-day contract expired .

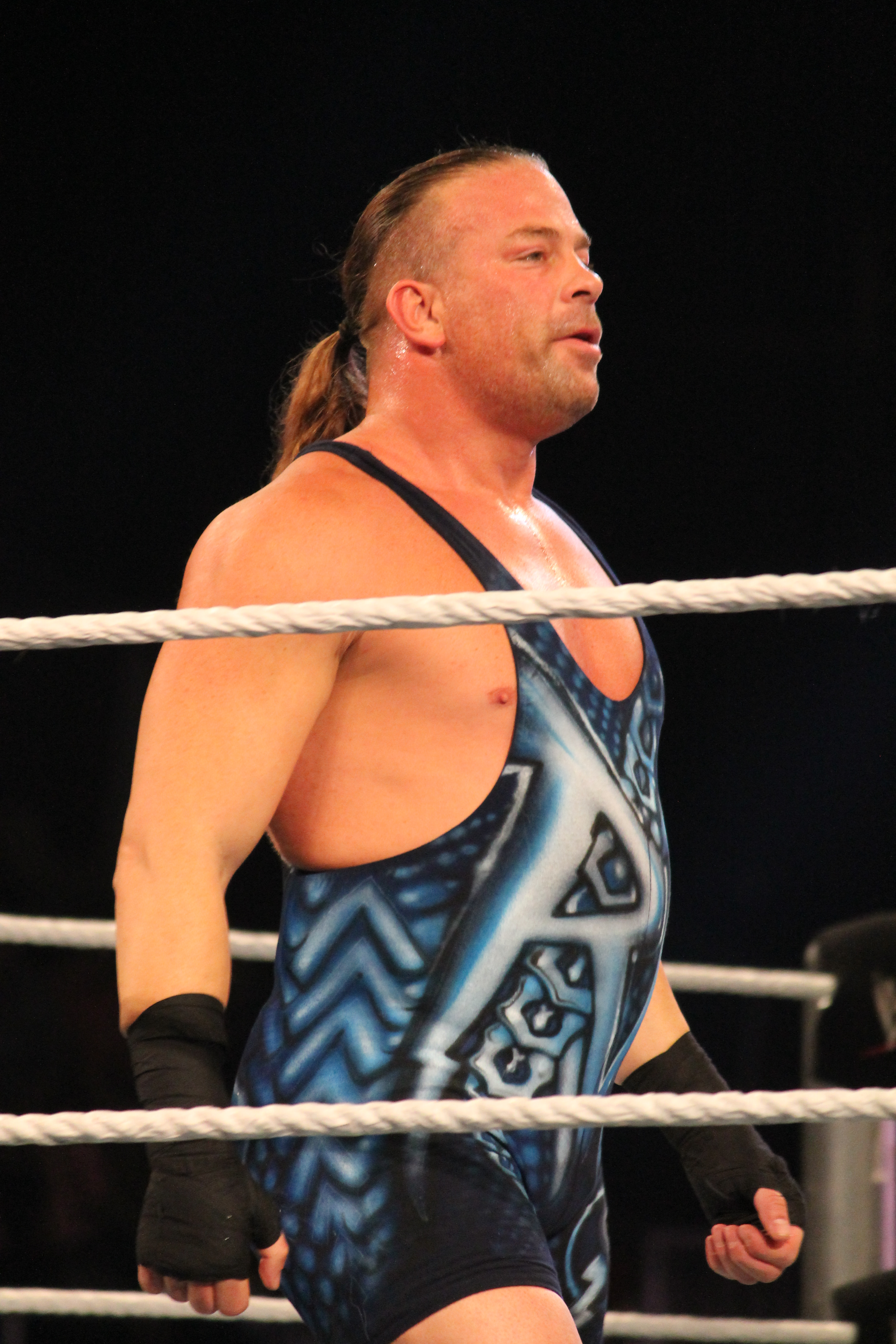
Van Dam in April 2014

Van Dam signed a 5-month contract and returned to WWE on the April 7, 2014, episode of Raw, defeating Damien Sandow and would later defeat him once more in a rematch on the following SmackDown. Shortly after, he entered into a WWE Intercontinental Championship tournament, defeating Alberto Del Rio in the first round and Cesaro in the semifinals but lost in the final round to Bad News Barrett. Following this he entered into a feud with Cesaro and Jack Swagger, having gained pinfall victories over both men in the lead up to Extreme Rules on May 4, where Van Dam would go on to lose to Cesaro and Jack Swagger in a Triple Threat Elimination match, which was won by Cesaro after pinning Van Dam last, who had pinned Swagger first. Following Extreme Rules, Van Dam would once more go on to defeat Cesaro and Jack Swagger on separate occasions in rematches on both Raw and SmackDown. On the May 19 edition of Raw, Van Dam won a Beat the Clock challenge match by defeating Alberto Del Rio in the fastest time, to become the top contender for the Intercontinental Championship at Payback on June 1, although he lost to Barrett at Payback. On the June 16 episode of Raw, Van Dam competed in a Battle Royal with the winner gaining a WWE World Heavyweight Championship opportunity, the match was won by Roman Reigns. At Money in the Bank on June 29, Van Dam took part in the Money in the Bank Ladder match for the briefcase, but was won by Seth Rollins. At SummerSlam on August 17, Van Dam defeated Cesaro during the pre-show. Following SummerSlam, Van Dam would go on to team with Roman Reigns and Sheamus in a six-man tag team match in a winning effort against Randy Orton, Ryback and Curtis Axel on the August 18 episode of Raw. After defeating Seth Rollins by countout on the August 26 edition of Main Event, Van Dam's final match with WWE was on the August 29 episode of SmackDown, where he faced Rollins in a losing effort. He made an appearance at the 2014 Slammy Awards to present the Slammy Award for Extreme Moment of the Year.

=== Second return to the independent circuit (2015–present) ===
In 2015, Van Dam appeared at many circuit shows including one night appearances at House of Hardcore. On June 7, 2015, Van Dam performed at Citi Field for the Legends of Wrestling and defeated Scott Steiner by pinfall. During a post match attacked by Steiner and Doc Gallows, Goldberg would come to his aid and spear Steiner. Van Dam faced John Morrison at Pro Wrestling Syndicate in Rahway, New Jersey, on October 24, 2015, in a losing effort. After the match, Morrison shook hands with Van Dam and led the crowd in an "RVD" chant. Van Dam would compete for Pro Wrestling Pride (PWP) in June 2016, defeating then PWP Catch Division Champion Scotty Essex in Taunton, England. Van Dam faced Pentagón Jr. for PCW Heavyweight Championship at PCW Ultra in Torrance, California, on November 11, 2016, in a winning effort, it was his first championship after he left WWE in 2014. Van Dam was scheduled to compete in a 128-man tournament starting from June 10, 2017, hosted by 5 Star Wrestling, which was later postponed to February 2018. On July 30, Van Dam was announced to compete at Insane Championship Wrestling (ICW) Fear & Loathing X against Lionheart.

=== Return to Impact Wrestling (2019–2020) ===
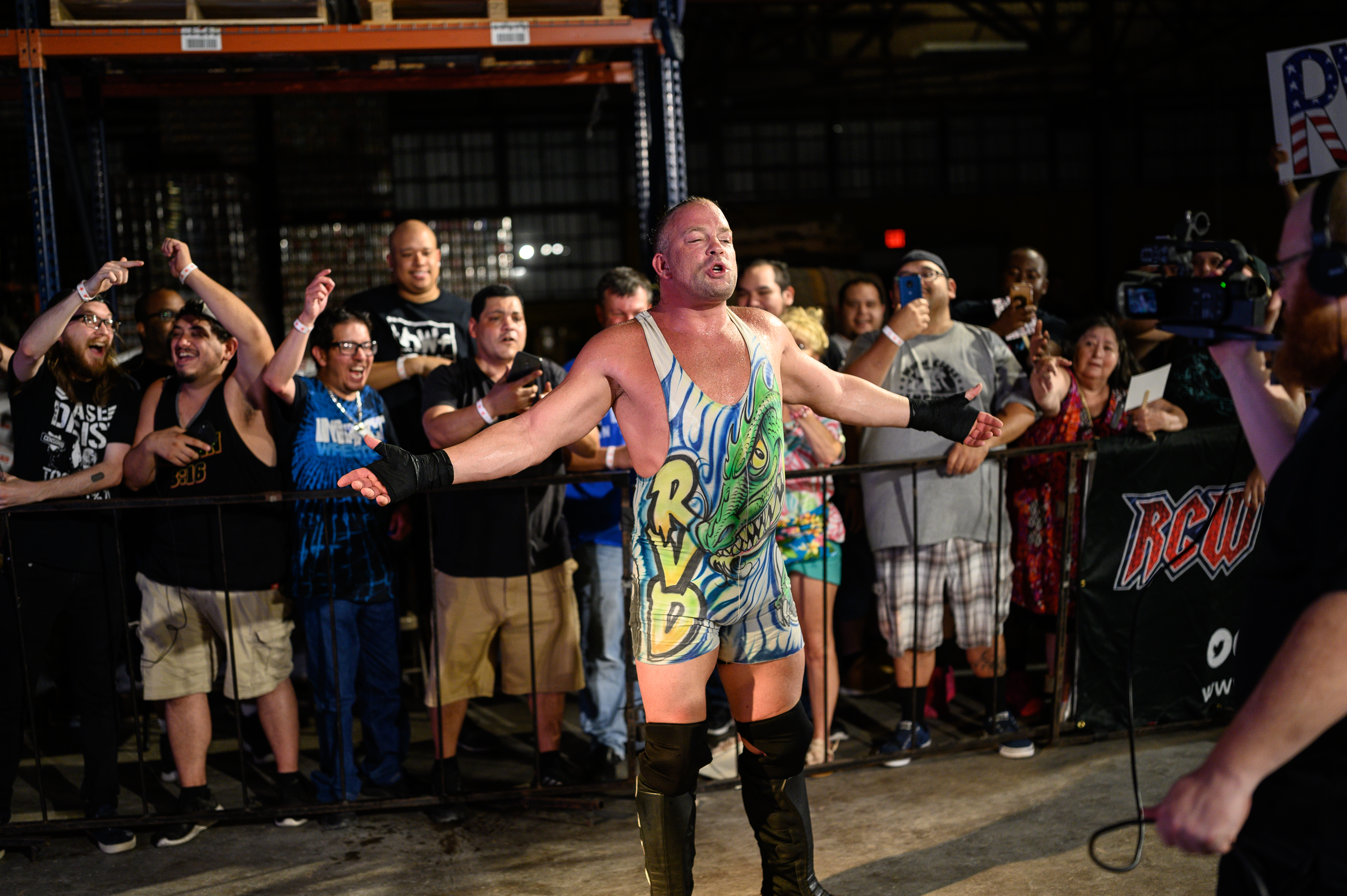
In 2019, Van Dam made his return to Impact Wrestling.

On February 8, 2019, it was revealed that Van Dam would return to TNA, now named Impact Wrestling at their WrestleMania 35-weekend show, United We Stand. At United We Stand on April 4, 2019, he teamed with Sabu and faced Lucha Bros (Pentagón Jr. and Fénix) in a hardcore match. After indicating in interviews that he would be working with the company more, on April 3, Van Dam announced that he had signed a short-term deal with Impact and would be appearing on their programming following United We Stand. His contract initially ran through Bound for Glory in October. His return to Impact television occurred in late-April, where he defeated Ethan Page. Van Dam then formed an alliance with ECW alumni Tommy Dreamer and Sabu to feud with Page, Josh Alexander and Moose. The trio would defeat Moose, Page and Alexander in a six-man tag. At Bash at the Brewery in July, Van Dam defeated Sami Callihan in an Extreme Rules match. A few days later, the storyline between Moose and Van Dam came to a close, as Moose defeated Van Dam at Slammiversary XVII. On October 20, 2019, on Bound for Glory, Van Dam teamed with Rhino where they challenged for the Impact World Tag Team Championship. At the climax of the match, Van Dam turned heel for the first time in his Impact Wrestling career, as well as his first heel turn since being a member of the Alliance during his WWF/E career, by attacking Rhino, Willie Mack, and Rich Swann, losing the match in the process. During early 2020, Van Dam was part of a censorious heel stable called "Cancel Culture" along with Joey Ryan and Jake Crist. However, this story abruptly ended when Ryan's contract was terminated amid over a dozen allegations of sexual assault. His last storyline with Impact Wrestling was with Sami Callihan, whom Van Dam defeated in his final match for the promotion which aired on September 22, 2020, edition of Impact! before leaving the promotion in September 2020.

=== Second return to WWE and sporadic appearances (2019–present) ===
Despite his association with Impact Wrestling, Van Dam made a one-night return to WWE for the special Raw Reunion episode of Raw on July 22, 2019.

Following heavy speculation, it was announced by WWE and Fox Sports on March 29 that Van Dam would be an inductee into the 2021 WWE Hall of Fame class. He later made an appearance at the 2022 Hall of Fame ceremony.

On April 28, 2023, Van Dam appeared on Friday Night SmackDown to announce second round WWE draft picks for RAW. He would appear the next week on RAW, May 1, to announce the fourth round draft picks for Friday Night SmackDown.

On September 13, 2024, Van Dam was shown in attendance for SmackDown's return to the USA Network.

Van Dam appeared on the October 29, 2024 episode of NXT to say that he would be appearing at NXT 2300.

=== Pro Wrestling Noah (2022) ===
On April 30, 2022, it was announced that Van Dam would make his in-ring debut in CyberFight's Pro Wrestling Noah on June 12, at the CyberFight Festival 2022. He was scheduled to team with the Stinger duo of Hayata and Yoshinari Ogawa to face Kaito Kiyomiya, Daisuke Harada and Yo-Hey.

=== All Elite Wrestling (2023–2024) ===
On August 2, 2023, Van Dam made his debut in All Elite Wrestling (AEW), appearing on AEW Dynamite to challenge FTW Champion Jack Perry on behalf of longtime rival Jerry Lynn. On the following week's Dynamite, Van Dam unsuccessfully challenged Perry for his championship title in an FTW Rules match. Van Dam then made several further appearances teaming with Hook.

On the January 31, 2024, episode of Dynamite, Van Dam returned to AEW in a losing effort against Swerve Strickland in a hardcore match. Van Dam would later slate fans who had questioned whether or not he could "still go" at his age against Strickland. On the February 21 episode of Dynamite, Van Dam teamed with Hook and "Hangman" Adam Page in a losing effort against AEW World Champion Samoa Joe and Mogul Embassy (Strickland and Brian Cage). On the April 20 episode of AEW Rampage, Van Dam picked up his first singles victory in AEW, defeating Isiah Kassidy, Komander, and Lee Johnson in a "High Flying 4/20" four-way elimination match.

=== Major League Wrestling (2025) ===
At Battle Riot VII on April 5, 2025, Van Dam competed in the traditional 40-man Battle Riot match for the MLW World Heavyweight Championship won by Matt Riddle and also involving various other notable opponents such as Donovan Dijak, Bishop Dyer, Mads Krule Krügger, Tom Lawlor, and many others.

== Professional wrestling style, persona and reception ==
The name "Rob Van Dam" was given to him in 1992 by Ron Slinker, a promoter in Florida, possibly because of his martial arts experience and his resemblance to actor Jean-Claude Van Damme. During the early years of his career, he used a split-legged moonsault as finisher, until he adopted the Frog Splash (named Five Star Frog Splash) as finisher. During WWE Hall of Fame ceremony in 2021, WWE's chairman Vince McMahon and Triple H said that he changed the style of wrestling. Van Dam's name and style was an influence on Belgian professional wrestler and later promoter Bernard Vandamme.

== Other media ==
Van Dam has appeared on numerous television shows and in films. In 1995, he was in Superfights as "The Mercenary", and in 1997 he appeared in Bloodmoon as "Dutch Scholtz". On October 23, 1999, he appeared in City Guys, in the episode "El-Trainmania IV" as himself. In 2000 he appeared in 18 Wheels of Justice, on August 2 as "Robert Laramie", and in The X-Files on May 7 as "Burt's opponent" in the episode "Fight Club". He also appeared on V.I.P. in the episode "Survi-Val" as "Major Ving Talbot" that year. On July 26, 2001, he appeared as himself on Spy TV, and again later that year he appeared as himself in Ultimate Revenge on December 2. In 2002, he was featured in the music video for Breaking Point's "One of a Kind" along with starring in two films, Black Mask 2: City of Masks as "Claw", and a cameo appearance in The Backyard as himself. In 2005, the Rob Van Dam: One of a Kind DVD was released. He also appeared on Hulk Hogan's Celebrity Championship Wrestling in 2008 teaching finishing moves to the celebrities. In 2011 he worked alongside WWE wrestlers Dave Bautista and Nelson Frazier Jr. in a movie titled Wrong Side of Town which was released the following year.

Van Dam started up RVD Radio on October 8, 2008, with the help of Brett Cohen, a producer for BlogTalkRadio. The episodes have changed between an hour and two-hour-long, initially held weekly but now sporadically held at www.blogtalkradio.com/rvdradio.

In November 2010 he was a contestant on an all TNA week of Family Feud, teaming with Jay Lethal, Matt Morgan, Mick Foley and Mr. Anderson in a winning effort against Angelina Love, Christy Hemme, Lacey Von Erich, Tara and Velvet Sky.

He also provides the voice for the character "Bobby", who served as a commentator for the Professor Genki side-quests, in the video games Saints Row: The Third and Saints Row IV.

Van Dam has appeared in multiple video games, including ECW Hardcore Revolution in 2000, with his most recent being in WWE 2K24.

=== Professional wrestling games ===
| Year | Title | Notes |
|---|---|---|
| 2000 | ECW Hardcore Revolution | First video game appearance Cover athlete |
| 2000 | ECW Anarchy Rulz | Cover athlete |
| 2001 | Legends of Wrestling | Cover athlete |
| 2002 | WWE WrestleMania X8 | First WWE video game appearance Cover athlete |
| 2002 | WWE Road to WrestleMania X8 | Cover athlete |
| 2002 | WWE SmackDown! Shut Your Mouth | |
| 2003 | WWE WrestleMania XIX | |
| 2003 | WWE Raw 2 | |
| 2003 | WWE SmackDown! Here Comes the Pain | |
| 2004 | WWE Day of Reckoning | |
| 2004 | WWE Survivor Series | |
| 2004 | WWE SmackDown! vs. Raw | |
| 2005 | WWE WrestleMania 21 | |
| 2005 | WWE Day of Reckoning 2 | |
| 2005 | WWE SmackDown! vs. Raw 2006 | |
| 2006 | WWE SmackDown vs. Raw 2007 | |
| 2010 | WWE SmackDown vs. Raw 2011 | |
| 2014 | WWE SuperCard | |
| 2014 | WWE 2K15 | |
| 2017 | WWE Tap Mania | |
| 2017 | WWE 2K18 | |
| 2022 | WWE 2K22 | DLC |
| 2023 | WWE 2K23 | |
| 2024 | WWE 2K24 | |
| 2025 | WWE 2K25 | |
| 2026 | WWE 2K26 | |

=== Filmography ===
- 1995 Superfights as Mercenary
- 1997 Bloodmoon as "Dutch"
- 1999 City Guys as Himself (1 episode, "El Trainmania IV")
- 2000 18 Wheels of Justice as Robert Laramie (1 episode, "Outside Chance")
- 2000 The X-Files as Burt's Opponent (1 episode, "Fight Club")
- 2000 V.I.P. as Major Talbot (1 episode, "Survi-Val")
- 2001 Spy TV as Various (1 episode)
- 2001 Ultimate Revenge as Himself (2 episodes)
- 2002 Black Mask 2: City of Masks as "Claw"
- 2002 The Backyard as Himself (cameo)
- 2005 One of a Kind as Himself
- 2008 Hulk Hogan's Celebrity Championship Wrestling as Himself (1 episode, "Train with the Pros")
- 2009 Sketch of Life as Himself
- 2009 Bloodstained Memoirs as Himself
- 2010 Wrong Side of Town as Bobby Kalinowsky
- 2010 Family Feud as Himself (5 episodes)
- 2012 Olympic Trials with Kurt Angle as Himself (Funny or Die short)
- 2015 3-Headed Shark Attack
- 2016 Nine Legends
- 2016 Sniper: Special Ops as Vasquez
- 2016 Traveling the Stars: Action Bronson and Friends Watch Ancient Aliens as Himself (1 episode, "Alien Devastation")
- 2019 Headstrong as Himself
- 2019 2nd Chance for Christmas as Bobby
- 2020 Tea Time as Action Figure
- 2021 Assault on VA-33 as Zero
- 2024 The Realtor as The Dominator
- 2026 Night of the Rising Dead as Harris

=== Voice acting ===
- 2011 Saints Row: The Third as Bobby
- 2013 Saints Row IV as Bobby

== Personal life ==
A booklet of Rob Van Dam rolling papers, sold by RVDCBD

Szatkowski is of Belgian and Polish ancestry. Szatkowski married Sonya Delbeck on September 6, 1998, the couple separated in December 2015. In July 2016, Delbeck filed for divorce from Szatkowski. The divorce was finalized in May 2018. In 2016, Szatkowski began dating fellow professional wrestler Katie Forbes. In 2021, Forbes and Szatkowski had gotten married. In June 2025, Forbes and Szatkowski announced they are expecting twins, due in 2026. On December 26, 2025, the couple welcomed twin daughters, Karma and Saba, with the latter named after the late Sabu.

=== Cannabis ===
Szatkowski is an advocate for the legalization of cannabis. He has discussed the topic in various media, including on MSNBC where he debated former U.S. "drug czar" Barry McCaffrey. Szatkowski is also a consumer of cannabis, believing it to be an athletic enhancer. His personal affinity for cannabis has been reflected in his wrestling persona, including his use of the phrase "RVD 4:20 means I just smoked your ass."

In 2020, Szatkowski established and licensed his name to RVDCBD, a cannabinoids company specializing in CBD and cannabis paraphernalia. In 2021, he was named chairman of United American Petroleum Corp (UAPC), a shell company that acquired RVDCBD and seeks to acquire other cannabis properties.

==== 2006 arrest ====
On July 3, 2006, The Ironton Tribune reported that Szatkowski and Terry Brunk (known as Sabu) had been arrested on the previous evening on U.S. Route 52 in Hanging Rock, Ohio. Szatkowski had been stopped for speeding by an Ohio State Highway Patrol trooper, who discovered that he was in possession of 18 grams of marijuana and five Vicodin pills, while Brunk was in possession of drug paraphernalia and nine tablets of testolactone. Both Szatkowski and Brunk were released after posting bail, and were scheduled to appear in Ironton Municipal Court on July 6. On July 6, The Ironton Tribune reported that the court date for Szatkowski and Brunk were in limbo, as their attorneys had asked for and were granted continuances. On August 31, Szatkowski pleaded guilty to speeding and possession of marijuana but the charge of Vicodin possession was dropped when he produced a prescription. He was fined $140 and additional court costs.

According to the WWE's wellness policy, a drug-related arrest can lead to that talent's immediate dismissal from the company. Then-WWE Vice President of Talent Relations John Laurinaitis released a statement on WWE.com reporting that Szatkowski and Brunk were still eligible to compete on the Raw and ECW tapings in the following days while an investigation conducted by WWE was being undertaken. This resulted in Szatkowski dropping the WWE Championship at the live Raw one night and the ECW Championship the next night at the ECW taping. Van Dam was subsequently suspended without pay for 30 days, and an on-air segment on ECW was scripted to relay this suspension to the fans. The arrest footage itself and a recounting from Szatkowski is seen in the film Nine Legends.

=== Training ===
Szatkowski is a trained kickboxer and martial artist. Growing up in Battle Creek, Michigan, Szatkowski studied martial arts at two local dojos. He received instruction in Karate, Taekwondo, Aikido, Kickboxing, Kendo, and Kajukenbo. In 1990, he placed second in the Kalamazoo Heavyweight Toughman Contest. Szatkowski is also an outspoken advocate of vitamins and bodybuilding supplements and attributes this to his mother's influence.

He is the inventor of the Van Dam Lift, a weightlifting technique that involves performing a split (which he took up in his early teens) between two benches and lifting a dumbbell from the floor to the waist. The lift was approved by IAWA, the International All-Around Weightlifting Association, in 1998. It was also entered in the rulebooks of USAWA, the United States All-Round Weightlifting Association.

== Championships and accomplishments ==
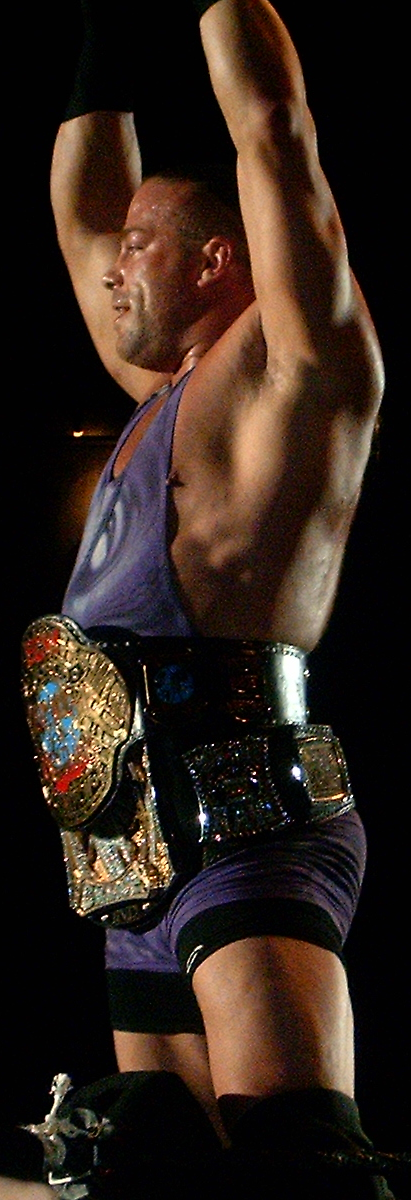
Van Dam is a three-time World Champion, having simultaneously held both the WWE Championship and ECW World Heavyweight Championship in WWE...

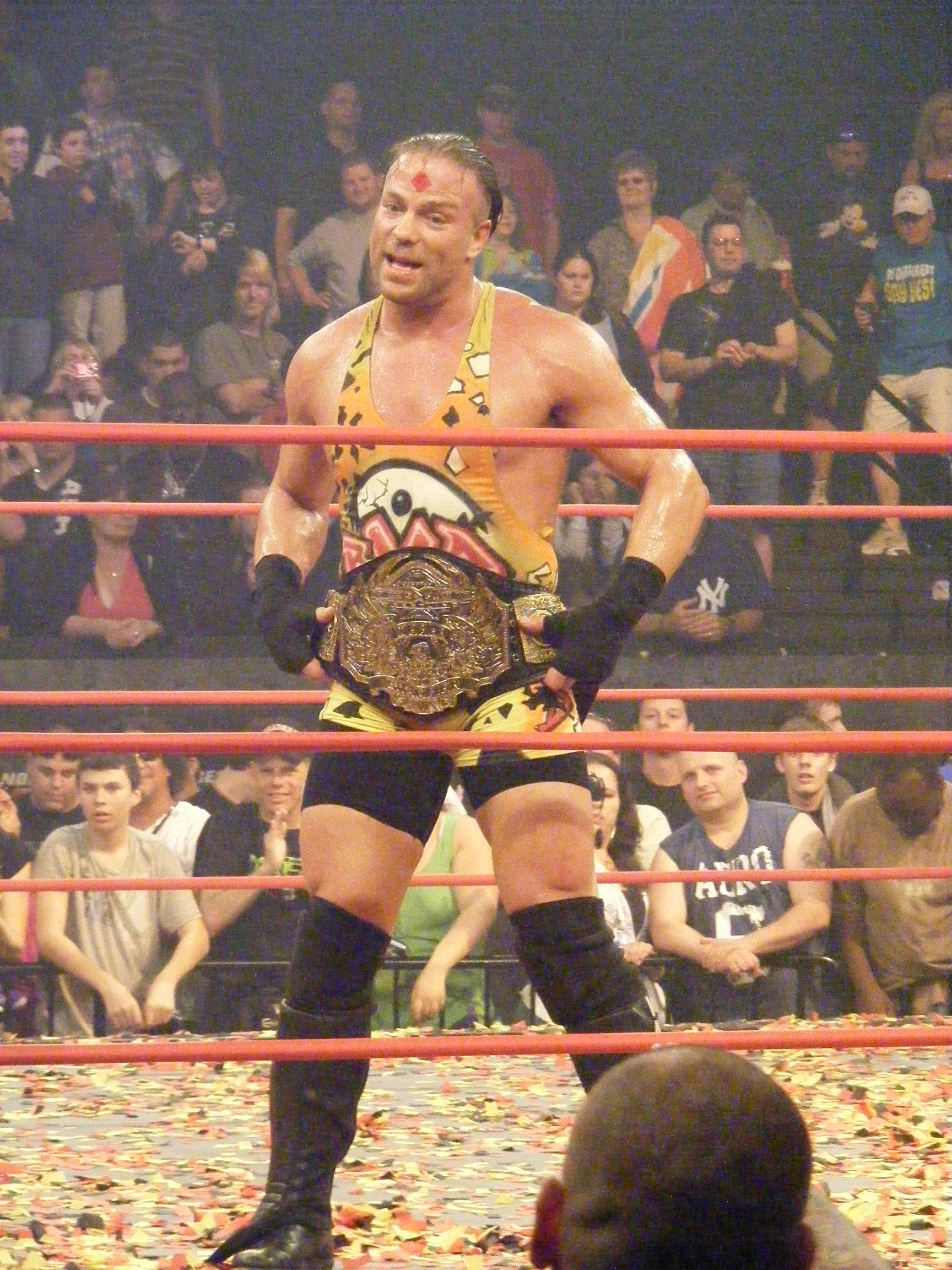
...and the TNA World Heavyweight Championship in TNA Wrestling.

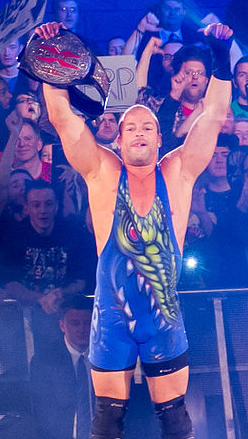
Van Dam is also a former TNA X Division Champion.

- All Action Wrestling
  - Perth Classic Tournament (2017)
- All Star Wrestling
  - ASW North American Heavyweight Championship (1 time)
- American Wrestling Rampage
  - AWR Heavyweight Championship (1 time)
  - AWR No Limits Championship (1 time)
- Battle Championship Wrestling
  - BCW Heavyweight Championship (1 time)
- Cauliflower Alley Club
  - Lou Thesz/Art Abrams Lifetime Achievement Award (2020)
- Extreme Championship Wrestling
  - ECW World Television Championship (1 time)
  - ECW World Tag Team Championship (2 times) – with Sabu
- Hardcore Hall of Fame
  - Class of 2022
- International Wrestling Federation
  - IWF Television Championship (1 time)
- National Wrestling Council
  - NWC Tag Team Championship (1 time) – with Bobby Bradley
- No Limits Wrestling
  - NLW Heavyweight Championship (1 time)
- Over the Top Wrestling
  - OTT No Limits Championship (1 time)
- Pacific Coast Wrestling
  - PCW Heavyweight Championship (1 time)
- Peach State Wrestling
  - PSW Cordele City Heavyweight Championship (2 times)
- Pro Wrestling Illustrated
  - Comeback of the Year (2001, 2010)
  - Most Popular Wrestler of the Year (2001, 2002)
  - Ranked No. 1 of the top 500 singles wrestlers in the PWI 500 in 2002
  - Ranked No. 152 of the top 500 singles wrestlers in the PWI Years in 2003
- South Atlantic Pro Wrestling
  - SAPW Tag Team Championship (1 time) – with Chaz Rocco
- Total Nonstop Action Wrestling
  - TNA World Heavyweight Championship (1 time)
  - TNA X Division Championship (1 time)
- World Stars of Wrestling
  - WSW World Heavyweight Championship (1 time)
- World Wrestling Federation/Entertainment/WWE
  - WWE Championship (1 time)
  - ECW World Heavyweight Championship (1 time)
  - WWE Intercontinental Championship (6 times)
  - WWE European Championship (1 time)
  - WWE Hardcore Championship (4 times)
  - WWE Tag Team Championship (1 time) – with Rey Mysterio
  - World Tag Team Championship (2 times) – with Kane (1) and Booker T (1)
  - Money in the Bank (2006)
  - WWE Hall of Fame (Class of 2021)
  - Seventh Grand Slam Champion
  - 15th Triple Crown Champion

== Notes ==
| Preceded by Edge | Mr. Money in the Bank; 2006 | Succeeded by Mr. Kennedy |
