= Hardcore Heaven (2000) =

2000 Extreme Championship Wrestling pay-per-view event

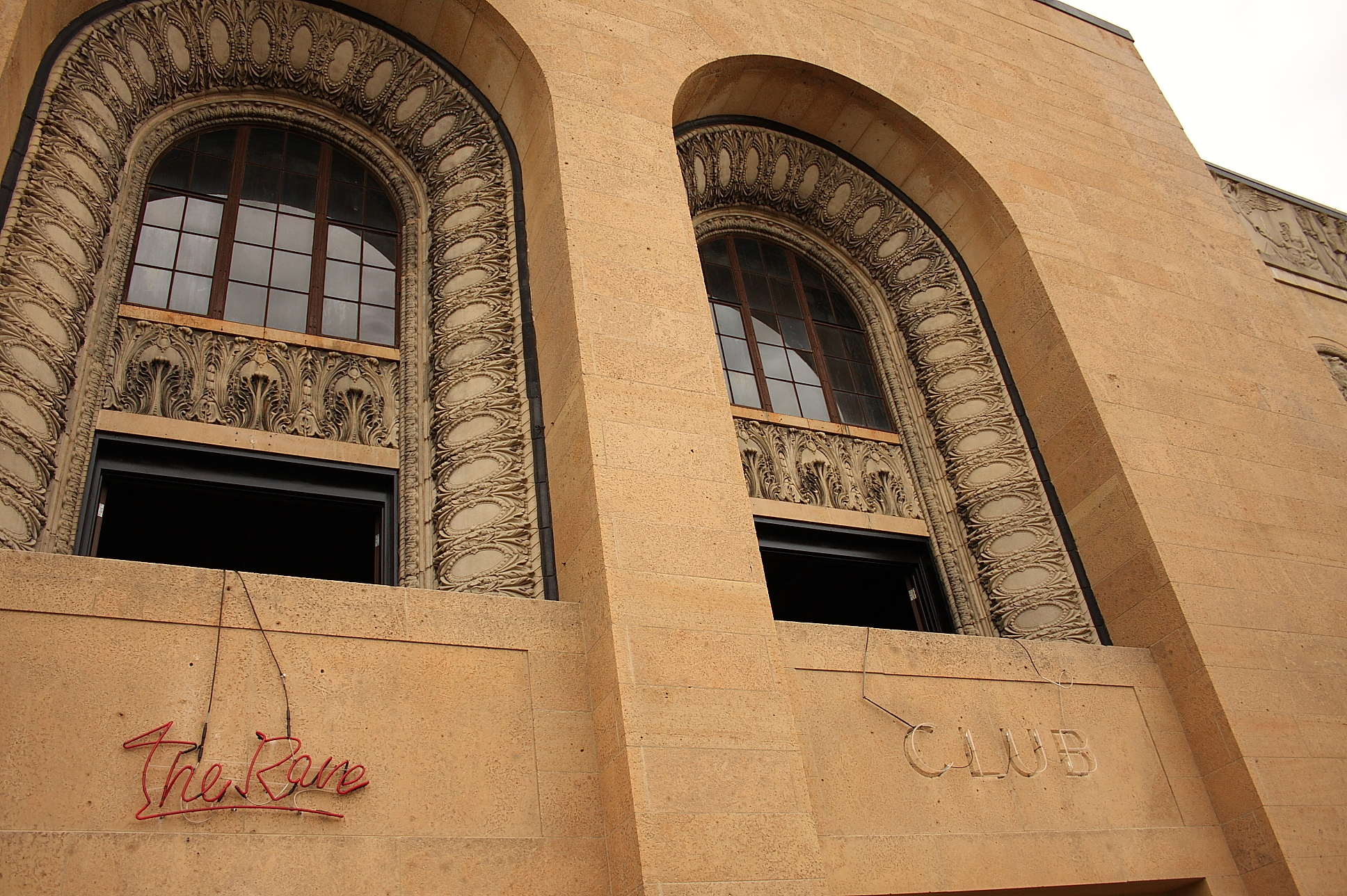
- The Rave.
- Promotion: Extreme Championship Wrestling
- Date: May 14, 2000
- City: Milwaukee, Wisconsin
- Venue: The Rave
- Attendance: 3,400
- Buy rate: 65,000

Pay-per-view chronology
← Previous; Living Dangerously	Next → Heat Wave

Hardcore Heaven chronology
← Previous; 1999	Next → Final

Hardcore Heaven (2000) was the sixth and final Hardcore Heaven professional wrestling pay-per-view (PPV) event produced by Extreme Championship Wrestling (ECW). The event took place on May 14, 2000, at The Rave in Milwaukee, Wisconsin. The commentators for the event were Joey Styles, Joel Gertner and Cyrus.

Nine professional wrestling matches were contested at the event. In the main event, Justin Credible successfully defended the World Heavyweight Championship against Lance Storm. On the undercard, Jerry Lynn defeated Rob Van Dam, who returned to ECW after a three-month absence since vacating the World Television Championship in March. The event also featured Rhino successfully defending the World Television Championship against The Sandman.

== Storylines ==
The event featured wrestlers from pre-existing scripted feuds and storylines. Wrestlers portrayed villains, heroes, or less distinguishable characters in the scripted events that built tension and culminated in a wrestling match or series of matches played out on ECW's television programs Hardcore TV and ECW on TNN.

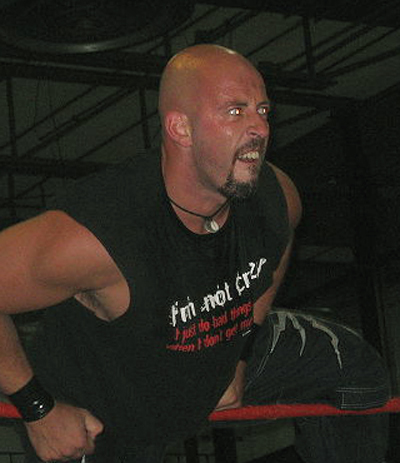
Justin Credible was the defending ECW World Heavyweight Champion heading into the event.

In a very bizarre moment, the World Heavyweight Champion Mike Awesome jumped ship to World Championship Wrestling (WCW) but ECW booked then-World Wrestling Federation (WWF) superstar and a former ECW superstar Taz to defeat Awesome for the World Heavyweight Championship, with assistance by Tommy Dreamer on April 13. At CyberSlam, Dreamer defeated Tazz to win the World Heavyweight Championship and then Raven came to congratulate him followed by the one half of the World Tag Team Champions Justin Credible attacking both men and then throwing down the World Tag Team Championship belt and challenging Dreamer to an impromptu match for the title, which Credible won after Dreamer's valet Francine turned on Dreamer. On the May 5 episode of ECW on TNN, Credible's former Impact Players tag team partner Lance Storm confronted him for throwing down the World Tag Team Championship and disrespecting ECW and their tag team and threatened to take the title from Credible and then a brawl ensued as Raven attacked Credible and Storm took down Raven and then Tommy Dreamer came out and brawled with Credible through the audience while Storm defeated Kid Kash. The following week, on ECW on TNN, Credible interfered in Storm's match against Jerry Lynn until Dreamer came out and brawled with Credible and Storm took out both men by diving over the top rope onto both of them, leading to a match between the three for the title at Hardcore Heaven.

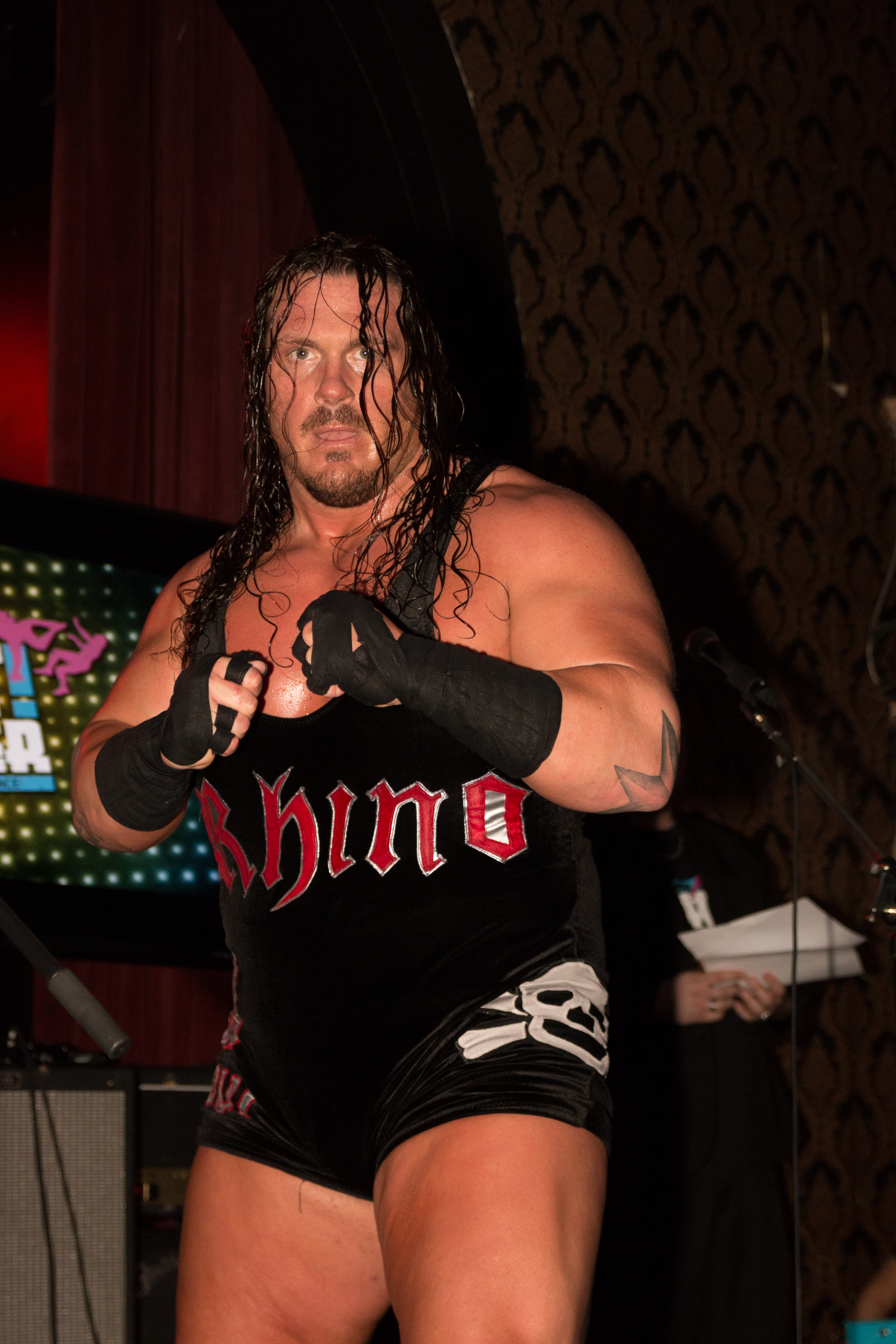
Rhino was the defending World Television Champion heading into the event.

At Living Dangerously, Super Crazy defeated Rhino in the final of a tournament to win the vacant World Television Championship after Scotty Anton and Rob Van Dam prevented The Network from interfering on Rhino's behalf. On the March 24 episode of ECW on TNN, Crazy successfully defended the title against Network member Yoshihiro Tajiri in a Japanese Deathmatch and then Network attacked Crazy and The Sandman, who rushed to Crazy's rescue. Crazy then successfully defended the title against Rhino on the following week's ECW on TNN and then Network assaulted Crazy and Sandman once again. On the April 14 episode of ECW on TNN, Crazy lost the title to Tajiri in a three-way dance also involving Little Guido. At CyberSlam, Cyrus forced Tajiri to hand over the World Television Championship to Rhino but Tajiri refused and Cyrus forced Tajiri to defend the title against Rhino, resulting in Rhino defeating Tajiri with distraction by Steve Corino to win the title and then Tajiri was kicked out of Network. On the April 28 episode of ECW on TNN, Cyrus noted that Network influenced ECW and possessed the World Television Championship and announced that Rhino would defend the World Television Championship against The Sandman. On the May 5 episode of ECW on TNN, Sandman and Tajiri defeated Rhino and Steve Corino.

On the April 28 episode of ECW on TNN, Cyrus announced that Rob Van Dam would face Jerry Lynn at Hardcore Heaven. On the May 5 episode of ECW on TNN, Lynn competed in his first match in several months, in which he defeated Scotty Anton in Anton's first ECW match after Rhino accidentally struck Anton with a Gore that was intended for Lynn. After the match, Cyrus offered Lynn, a spot in Network but Lynn refused.

New Jack was involved in a rivalry with Da Baldies (Angel, Tony DeVito and Vic Grimes) since 1999 as he faced the team on numerous occasions. At November to Remember, Jack and Hardcore Chair Swingin' Freaks (Balls Mahoney and Axl Rotten) were defeated by Da Baldies in a handicap match. The feud continued as Angel defeated Jack at Guilty as Charged. At Living Dangerously, Jack competed against Vic Grimes in a match which ended terribly when Jack pulled Grimes off the scaffold and both men fell down.

== Event ==
=== Preliminary matches ===
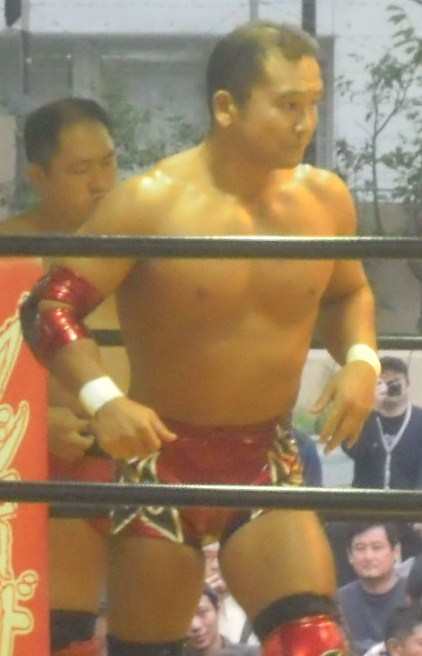
Masato Tanaka wrestled his last pay-per-view match for ECW at Hardcore Heaven.

The opening match took place between Balls Mahoney and Masato Tanaka. Mahoney began the match by applying a single leg Boston crab but Tanaka reached the ropes. Tanaka then followed with a flying crossbody and applied an armbar. Mahoney missed a spinning kick through the ropes and slipped out of the ring and Tanaka dived onto Mahoney but Mahoney threw him into the guardrail. Tanaka made a comeback by hitting Mahoney with a steel chair and then delivered a Tornado DDT onto the chair. The two men continued to brawl with each other through the chair until Mahoney superkicked thechair into Tanaka. Mahoney followed with a Nutcracker Suite onto four steel chairs but Tanaka countered with a Tornado DDT onto the chairs. Tanaka attempted a Rolling Elbow on Mahoney but Mahoney countered with a Nutcracker Suite and got a near-fall. Tanaka then executed a Diamond Dust on Mahoney to get a near-fall. Mahoney executed another Nutcracker Suite to Tanaka onto a pile of steel chairs and got another near-fall. Mahoney attempted a New Jersey Jam but missed it and Tanaka hit a Rolling Elbow to gain a near-fall. Tanaka then dived from the top rope to hit Mahoney with a steel chair and then delivered a Rolling Elbow to Mahoney for the win.

The next match that followed was the first three-Way dance of the show pitting Mikey Whipwreck against Simon Diamond and Little Guido. The match suffered a lot due to lights going off repeatedly during the match. Diamond was the first to get eliminated as Whipwreck executed a Whipper-Snapper on Diamond for the first elimination. This was followed by Guido delivering a Kiss of Death to Whipwreck to win the match.

It was followed by a match between Kid Kash and C. W. Anderson. Before the match started, Lou E. Dangerously praised Elektra as the toughest woman in wrestling until Jazz came out to brawl with The New Dangerous Alliance and then Anderson delivered a Superkick to Jazz and Kash came to her rescue to begin the match with Anderson. New Dangerous Alliance interfered on Anderson's behalf throughout the match. Near the end of the match, Kash attempted a Moonsault on Anderson but he caught him mid-air and countered it into a Ferris Wheel. Anderson followed it by powerslamming Kash and then superkicked Kash for a near-fall. Kash then delivered a Hurricanrana to Anderson from the top rope to win.

The second three-way match was next, in which Da Baldies (Angel and Tony DeVito) took on the team of Nova and Chris Chetti and the team of Danny Doring and Roadkill. All the three teams brawled with each other throughout the match until Vic Grimes interfered on Da Baldies' behalf, which allowed Angel to score the first elimination by hitting Doring with a guitar shot. After getting eliminated, Roadkill put Grimes through a table with a diving splash. The two teams continued to brawl with each other until Chetti executed an Amityville Horror to DeVito and then Nova and Chetti delivered a Tidal Wave to DeVito for the win. After the match, Da Baldies attacked Nova and Chetti until New Jack made the rescue by brawling with Da Baldies. He then drove DeVito through a table by performing a diving splash from the balcony and then Nova and Chetti held Angel and Jack struck him with a guitar and then began a match with Angel. Jack delivered a 187 to Angel to win the match.

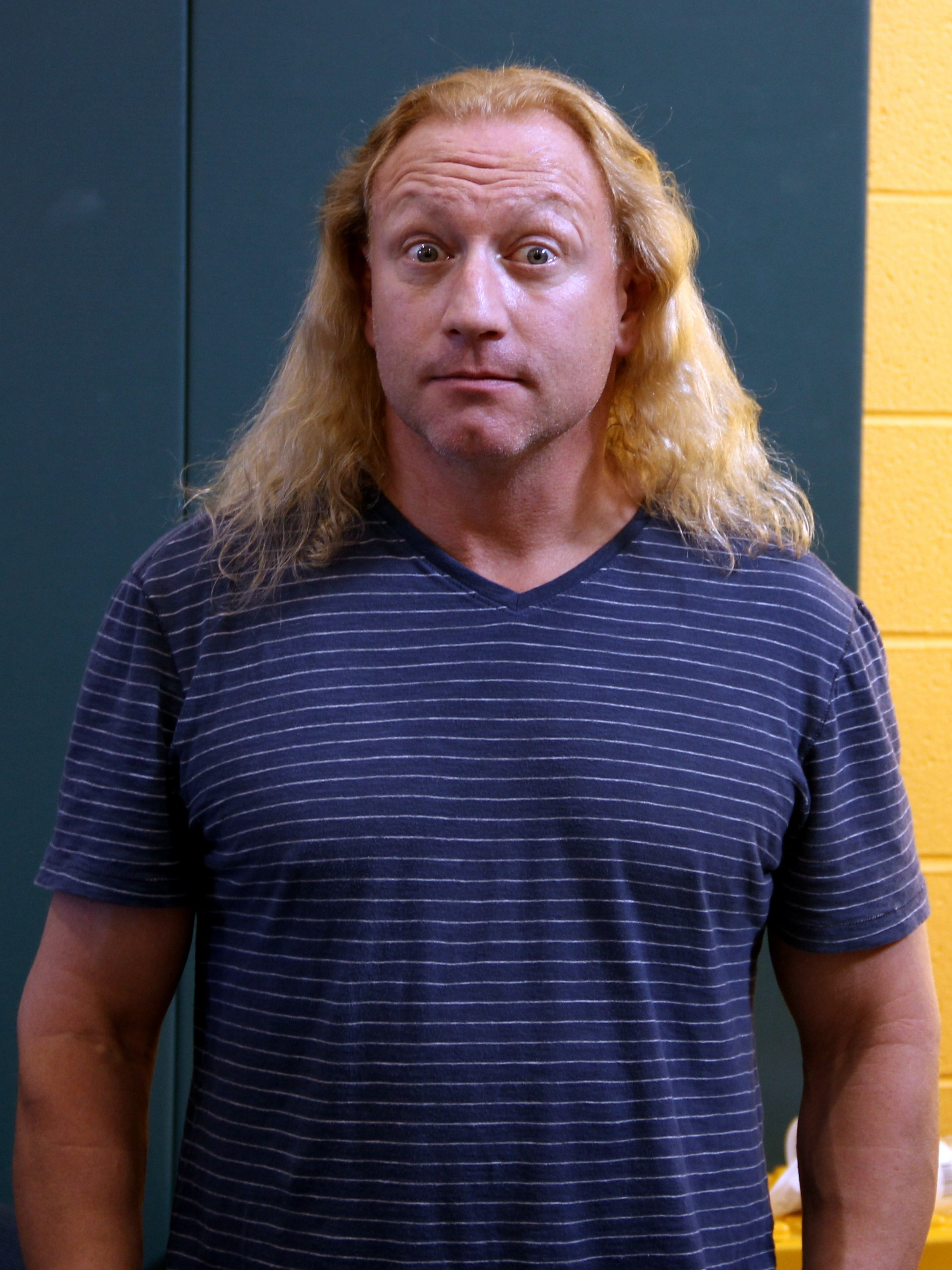
Jerry Lynn defeated Rob Van Dam in their second consecutive match at Hardcore Heaven.

Later, Yoshihiro Tajiri took on The Network's member Steve Corino. Tajiri made Corino bleed after hitting a Brainbuster in the earlier moments of the match. Jack Victory interfered on Corino's behalf during the match, allowing Corino to gain advantage over Tajiri. Near the end of the match, Corino placed a table in the ring and then applied an abdominal stretch on Corino but Tajiri reversed it into an octopus hold. Victory tried to interfere again but Tajiri blinded him with a mist. Tajiri then hit a series of quick punches and kicks to Corino and finished him off by putting him through the table with a diving double foot stomp. After the match, Tajiri was attacked by Kintaro Kanemura until Dusty Rhodes made the save against Network and then Rhino attacked Rhodes and The Sandman made the rescue for Rhodes. Rhino and Sandman then began their match with Rhino putting his World Television Championship on the line. During the match, Sandman's wife Lori Fullington interfered to prevent Network from interfering. Rhino delivered a Piledriver to Lori from the apron onto a table outside the ring to drive her through the table. Rhino set up a table in the corner of the ring and attempted a Gore to Lori through the table with Corino and Victory holding Lori for the Gore until Sandman struck them with a Singapore cane and then Rhino drove both Sandman and Lori through the cornered table with a Gore to retain the title.

In the penultimate match, Rob Van Dam took on Jerry Lynn, marking RVD's first match in three months. After a back and forth action between both men, Bill Alfonso crotched Lynn on the apron, allowing RVD to hit a Van Daminator and a Five-Star Frog Splash to Lynn with a steel chair beneath him. The Network then interfered in the match and then RVD and Lynn fought off Network and cleared them from the ring. Cyrus began giving instructions to Network and then RVD hit a Van Daminator to Cyrus. Lynn hit his own version of Van Daminator to Alfonso and then RVD hit a Van Daminator to Lynn and climbed the top rope to execute a Five-Star Frog Splash until RVD's friend Scotty Anton shoved him from the top rope into a cradle piledriver by Lynn for a near-fall. Lynn hit a second cradle piledriver to win the match. This marked RVD's first loss in two years.

=== Main event match ===
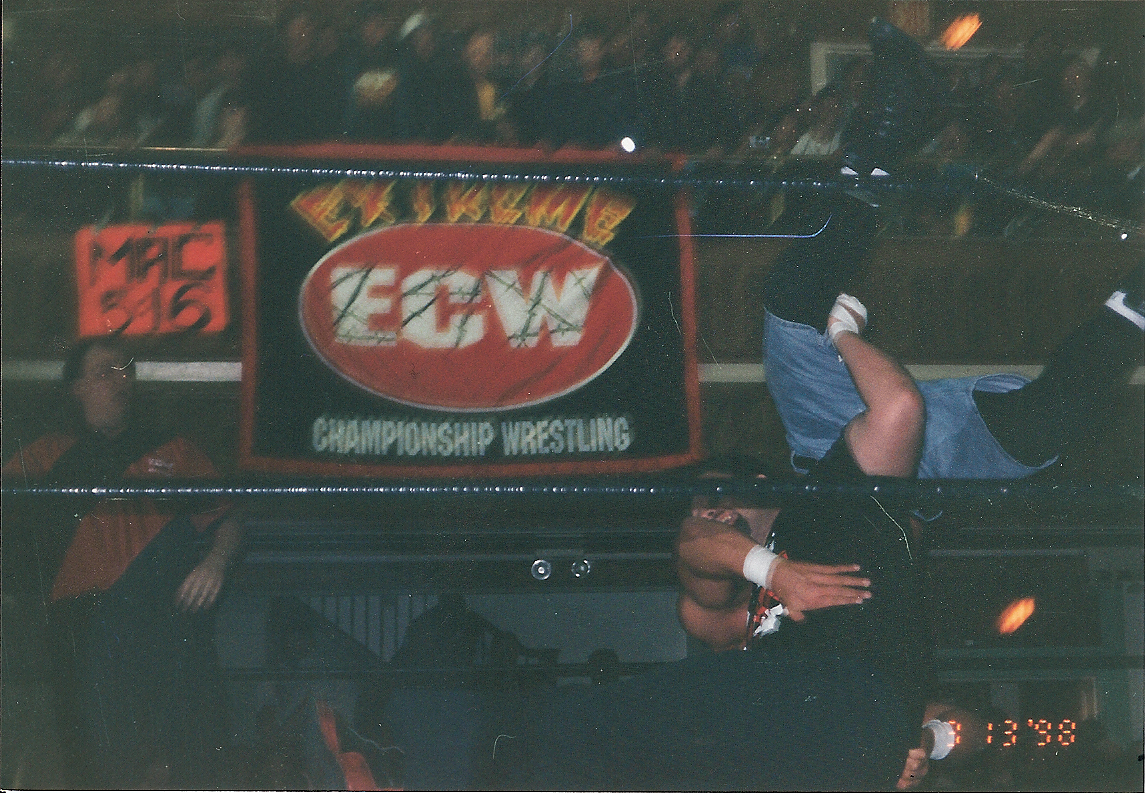
Tommy Dreamer executed a Dreamer Driver on Justin Credible after the main event.

Justin Credible was supposed to defend the World Heavyweight Championship against Tommy Dreamer and Lance Storm in a three-way dance but refused to defend the title against Dreamer and threatened to throw down the World Heavyweight Championship belt in a trashcan and Heyman held back Dreamer and Credible defended the title against Storm. Near the end of the match, Storm applied a single leg Boston crab on Credible until Francine broke it up and then Dawn Marie brawled with Francine. Credible executed a That's Incredible to Marie and then Storm hit Credible with a cane and followed with a Piledriver for a near-fall. Credible delivered a That's Incredible to Storm and gained a near-fall. Credible followed with an inverted DDT for another near-fall. Credible delivered a second That's Incredible to Storm to retain the title. After the match, Tommy Dreamer returned to the ring to hit Credible with a cane and then delivered a Dreamer Driver to Francine.

== Reception ==
Hardcore Heaven received positive reviews from critics. Kevin Pantoja of 411Mania appreciated the event, rating it a "good" event and gave it a score of 7, stating "This is one of the more enjoyable ECW Pay-Per-Views I can recall. It has a good mix of everything that stood out in ECW to me. You had the fast paced multi man matches, the extreme style of New Jack, the great exchanges between Lynn and RVD, the blood of Steve Corino and the insane spot with Sandman’s wife. There are some down moments like the lackluster main event but as a whole, it’s an enjoyable two and a half hours of wrestling."

Scott Keith of 411Mania gave a "marginal thumbs up" to the event and stated "the only real criteria left for ECW’s shows are entertainment value and workrate. And this certainly had both".

Arnold Furious of Wrestling Recaps gave a "thumbs up" to the show, with considering "a great mixture of wrestling and violence. This is ECW at its best. It’s a shame they felt the need to overbook the Lynn-RVD match. It didn’t need multiple run-ins it just needed the Anton heel turn. The main event was disappointing compared to the rest of the show and somewhat proved that Credible wasn’t really a viable champion. He could draw heat but he wasn’t good enough in the ring to match that. His match with Storm wasn’t what they expected."

John Powell of Canadian Online Explorer gave negative reviews on the show due to technical issues, stating "First they lost the introductory promo that usually follows Joey Styles and Joel Gertner's chat in the ring. Styles and Gertner looked dazed and confused as the cameras cut to shots of the audience. Then, the house lights went out during the three way match between Little Guido, Mikey Whipwreck and Simon Diamond. Spotlights were quickly turned on to illuminate the ring. The lights came back on after the match concluded. Also, several camera men were taken out when they got too close to the action. A rough night all around for ECW. In spite of the glitches, ECW maintained its composure and put on another rip-roaring show. Congrats to everyone for not missing a step. Though it might be nice in future if they announced the complete card ahead of time. Not doing so makes them look bush league at say the least."

== Aftermath ==
Mikey Whipwreck continued his feud with Little Guido after losing to him at Hardcore Heaven. On the May 19 episode of ECW on TNN, Whipwreck rescued Kid Kash from an assault by The Full Blooded Italians and then defeated Guido in a match.

The teams of Da Baldies, Nova and Chris Chetti and Danny Doring and Roadkill competed in a three-way dance rematch on the May 19 episode of ECW on TNN, which Doring and Roadkill won and then Da Baldies attacked Doring and Roadkill after the match until New Jack made the save. The feud carried onto Heat Wave, where Nova and Chetti defeated Da Baldies.

Masato Tanaka and Balls Mahoney competed in a rematch from Hardcore Heaven on the May 26 episode of ECW on TNN, which Tanaka won again. This would be Tanaka's last televised match in ECW as he left the company shortly after to return to Frontier Martial-Arts Wrestling.

Rhino and The Sandman continued their feud after Hardcore Heaven as the two faced in a rematch on the June 2 episode of ECW on TNN, which ended in a no contest due to interference by The Network, Rob Van Dam, Scotty Anton, Tajiri and Dusty Rhodes. The feud led to Rhino defending the title against Sandman again at Heat Wave, where Rhino retained the title again.

Scotty Anton's betrayal of Rob Van Dam at Hardcore Heaven, which cost RVD, the match against Jerry Lynn, resulted in a feud between RVD and Anton. Anton joined The Network and continued to feud with RVD. The two competed in a match at Heat Wave, which RVD won.

Lance Storm left ECW after losing to Justin Credible at Hardcore Heaven and joined World Championship Wrestling. After the event, Credible began a feud with Tommy Dreamer, which led to Credible defending the title against Dreamer in a Stairway to Hell match, which Credible won to retain the title.

On the June 23 episode of ECW on TNN, Steve Corino defeated Yoshihiro Tajiri in a rematch, with the help of Network-appointed special guest referee Jerry Lynn. Lynn tried to rectify his mistake by refereeing another match for Tajiri against Little Guido a week later on ECW on TNN but Tajiri ended up losing again. On the July 7 episode of ECW on TNN, Corino cost Lynn, a match against Tajiri, leading to Lynn beginning a feud with Network and defeating Corino in a match at Heat Wave.

== Results ==
No.	Results	Stipulations	Times
1	Masato Tanaka defeated Balls Mahoney	Singles match	9:15
2	Little Guido (with Sal E. Graziano) defeated Mikey Whipwreck (with The Sinister Minister) and Simon Diamond (with Mitch, Prodigy, Prodigette and The Musketeer)^{1}	Three-Way Dance	7:15
3	Kid Kash defeated C. W. Anderson (with Lou E. Dangerously, Billy Wiles and Elektra)	Singles match	5:57
4	Nova and Chris Chetti defeated Da Baldies (Angel and Tony DeVito), and Danny Doring and Roadkill^{2}	Three-Way Dance	6:32
5	New Jack defeated Angel (with Vic Grimes and Tony DeVito)	Singles match	9:00
6	Yoshihiro Tajiri defeated Steve Corino (with Jack Victory)	Singles match	10:22
7	Rhino (c) defeated The Sandman	Singles match for the ECW World Television Championship	6:15
8	Jerry Lynn defeated Rob Van Dam (with Bill Alfonso and Scotty Anton)	Singles match	19:54
9	Justin Credible (c) (with Francine) defeated Lance Storm (with Dawn Marie)	Singles match for the ECW World Heavyweight Championship	12:28
(c) / – the champion(s) heading into the match

=== Three-Way Dance eliminations ===
^1

Elimination	Wrestler	Eliminated by	Elimination move	Time
1	Simon Diamond	Mikey Whipwreck	Whipper-Snapper	5:34
2	Mikey Whipwreck	Little Guido	Kiss of Death	7:08
Winner:	Little Guido			

^2

Elimination	Wrestler	Team	Eliminated by	Elimination move	Time
1	Danny Doring	Danny Doring and Roadkill	Angel	Guitar shot	4:16
2	Tony DeVito	Da Baldies	Nova and Chris Chetti	Tidal Wave	6:35
Winners:	Nova and Chris Chetti				

== See also ==
- 2000 in professional wrestling
