= Heat Wave (1999) =

1999 Extreme Championship Wrestling pay-per-view event

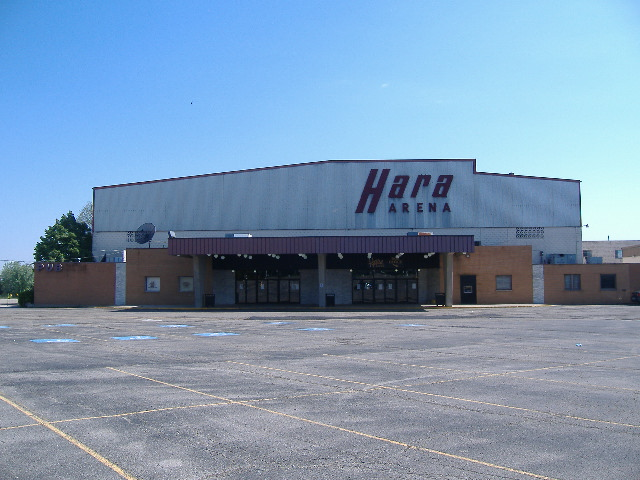
- The Hara Arena.
- Promotion: Extreme Championship Wrestling
- Date: July 18, 1999
- City: Dayton, Ohio
- Venue: Hara Arena
- Attendance: 3,400
- Buy rate: 100,000

Pay-per-view chronology
← Previous; Hardcore Heaven	Next → Anarchy Rulz

Heat Wave chronology
← Previous; 1998	Next → 2000

Heat Wave (1999) was the sixth Heat Wave professional wrestling pay-per-view (PPV) event produced by Extreme Championship Wrestling (ECW). The event took place on July 18, 1999 from the Hara Arena in Dayton, Ohio.

The event featured six professional wrestling matches. The main event was a tag team match, in which the team of Rob Van Dam and Jerry Lynn (with Bill Alfonso) defeated Impact Players (Lance Storm and Justin Credible). On the undercard, Taz successfully defended the World Heavyweight Championship against Yoshihiro Tajiri and the team of Spike Dudley and Balls Mahoney defeated The Dudley Boyz (Buh Buh Ray Dudley and D-Von Dudley) to win the World Tag Team Championship.

Rob Van Dam and Jerry Lynn versus Lance Storm and Justin Credible appeared on the 2012 WWE ECW Unreleased: Vol. 1 DVD and Blu-ray set.

== Event ==
Before the event aired live on pay-per-view, Vito LoGrasso defeated Simon Diamond in a match.

=== Preliminary matches ===
Before the opening match, Danny Doring proposed to on-screen girlfriend and manager, Angelica. In the opening match, Danny Doring and Amish Roadkill competed against Chris Chetti and Nova. Chetti brought Angelica in the ring to dance with him but Nova confronted him and then Angelica accidentally whacked Chetti with her hand. Chetti then nailed her with an Amityville Horror. Doring tried to attack but Nova nailed a Kryptonite Krunch to Doring and then Chetti hit an Amityville Horror to Roadkill. Chetti and Nova followed it with a Tidal Wave for the win.

Next, Jazz competed against Jason in an intergender match. Jason attempted to deliver a powerbomb to Jazz on a steel chair but Jazz reversed it into a Jazz Stinger on the chair for the win.

Next, Super Crazy took on Little Guido. Sal E. Graziano interfered in the match on Guido's behalf but Crazy took him out with a plancha and Guido nailed a Maritado to Crazy but got a near-fall. Crazy then hit a powerbomb on Guido for the win.

In the following match, The Dudley Boyz (Buh Buh Ray Dudley and D-Von Dudley) defended the World Tag Team Championship against Spike Dudley and Balls Mahoney. Before the match, the Dudleys unleashed an unscripted rant by throwing in insults towards the live audience and profane words. A woman spit at Buh Buh Ray Dudley's face and nearly incited a riot. Mahoney and Spike almost got the victory by nailing an Acid Drop and a Nutcracker Suite respectively and covered for the pinfall but Sign Guy Dudley pulled the referee out of the ring. Dudleys took advantage by attempting a 3D but Spike and Mahoney reversed it into roll-ups on both Dudleys to win the titles. After the match, Dudleys attacked the new champions and powerbombed Spike through a flaming table. New Jack then made his return to ECW and attacked Dudleys with weapons from a shopping cart.

Later, Tommy Dreamer cut a promo on ECW's new deal with TNN and said that he would be unable to become a part of the new ECW show on TNN due to his injury. Steve Corino interrupted Dreamer and demanded that Dreamer lay down for him, so he would pin him. Corino attacked Dreamer but Dreamer countered and Francine hit a DDT to Corino and pinned him with Dreamer counting the pinfall. Yoshihiro Tajiri came out and attacked Dreamer and Francine with kicks. He applied a Tarantula on Dreamer until Taz made the save and began the next match in which Taz defended the World Heavyweight Championship against Tajiri. Taz thwarted the interference of Corino, Jack Victory and Rhino and nailed Tajiri through a table with a Tazplex and then applied a Tazmission to Tajiri by wrapping barbed wire around his neck to retain the title.

=== Main event match ===
Rob Van Dam and Jerry Lynn took on The Impact Players (Lance Storm and Justin Credible) in the tag team main event. RVD tried to drive Credible through a table but Sabu interfered and splashed Credible through the table. RVD attempted a Five-Star Frog Splash on Storm but accidentally nailed Lynn with it and Storm crawled on Lynn but got a near-fall. RVD hit a Van Daminator to Storm and Lynn nailed a cradle piledriver for the win.

== Reception ==
Kevin Pantoja of 411Mania considered it an average event and gave a score rating of 6.5, writing "As with most ECW Pay-Per-Views, this flew by. Even with the long Dreamer and Dudley promos, something about ECW shows are just fun. The actual wrestling on the show was solid as well. Guido/Crazy and Lynn/RVD are probably the only two matches worth really checking out, but nothing is outright bad. Hell, even Jazz/Jason isn’t terrible."

Scott Keith of 411Mania wrote "There was almost an HOUR of interviews and promos, by my count, which is ridiculous. Other than that, a better than average ECW show, if a totally unremarkable one. It lacked the killer match-stealing show from last year, but then ECW is lacking Tanaka and Awesome right now anyway." He further stated "Thumbs up, but I doubt people will be able to remember the card two months from now."

Arnold Furious of Wrestling Recaps wrote "Lots of lovely solid action with the opening and closing tag matches being excellent." According to him, the main event match, the opening tag team match and the Super Crazy versus Little Guido match were the best matches of the show.

== Results ==
No.	Results	Stipulations	Times
1^{D}	Vito LoGrasso defeated Simon Diamond	Singles match	—
2	Chris Chetti and Nova defeated Danny Doring and Amish Roadkill (with Angelica)	Tag team match	7:03
3	Jazz defeated Jason Knight	Singles match	6:33
4	Super Crazy defeated Little Guido (with Sal E. Graziano)	Singles match	12:31
5	Spike Dudley and Balls Mahoney defeated The Dudley Boyz (Buh Buh Ray and D-Von) (c) (with Joel Gertner and Sign Guy Dudley)	Tag team match for the ECW World Tag Team Championship	15:41
6	Francine defeated Steve Corino	Singles match	—
7	Taz (c) defeated Yoshihiro Tajiri by submission	Singles match for the ECW World Heavyweight Championship	10:06
8	Rob Van Dam and Jerry Lynn (with Bill Alfonso) defeated Impact Players (Lance Storm and Justin Credible) (with Dawn Marie)	Tag team match	21:07
(c) / – the champion(s) heading into the match; D / – this was a dark match

== See also ==
- 1999 in professional wrestling
