= Hardcore Heaven (1999) =

1999 Extreme Championship Wrestling pay-per-view event

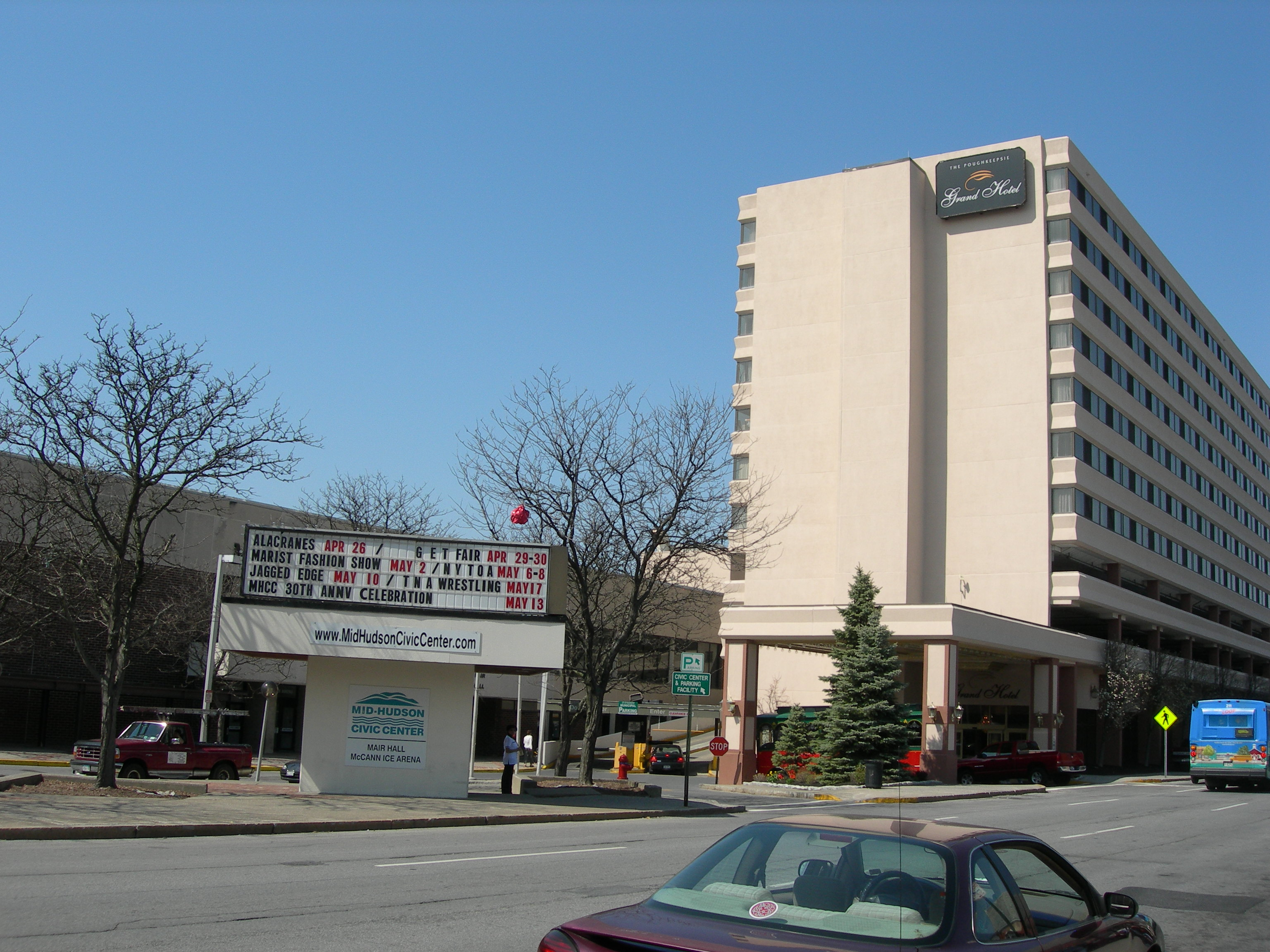
- The Mid-Hudson Civic Center.
- Promotion: Extreme Championship Wrestling
- Date: May 16, 1999
- City: Poughkeepsie, New York
- Venue: Mid-Hudson Civic Center
- Attendance: 2,800
- Buy rate: 75,000

Pay-per-view chronology
← Previous; Living Dangerously	Next → Heat Wave

Hardcore Heaven chronology
← Previous; 1997	Next → 2000

Hardcore Heaven (1999) was the fifth Hardcore Heaven professional wrestling pay-per-view (PPV) event and the second to be broadcast on pay-per-view. The event took place on May 16, 1999 at the Mid-Hudson Civic Center in Poughkeepsie, New York.

Eight professional wrestling matches took place at the event. The originally supposed main event was a singles match, in which Taz was supposed to defend the World Heavyweight Championship against Chris Candido, with Taz beating Candido to retain the title in the opening match. In the changed main event, Taz successfully defended the title against Buh Buh Ray Dudley in a falls count anywhere match. The World Television Championship and the World Tag Team Championship were also successfully defended at the event.

== Event ==
Before the event aired live on pay-per-view, Skull Von Crush defeated Danny Doring in a non-televised match.

=== Preliminary matches ===
Chris Candido interrupted Joey Styles' introduction and brought out The Dudley Boyz (Buh Buh Ray Dudley and D-Von Dudley) as his insurance policy for his World Heavyweight Championship match against Taz in the main event. Taz however came to confront Candido and their title match began. Taz took out Dudleys but Candido gained control by powerbombing Taz. Candido missed a diving headbutt, allowing Taz to hit a T-Bone Tazplex and apply a Tazmission to retain the title. After the match, Dudley Boyz hit a 3D to Taz. Dudleys then issued an open challenge to put the titles on the line which was answered by Balls Mahoney. Moments later, Spike Dudley joined Mahoney as his tag team partner. Dudleys were about to hit a 3D on Spike but Mahoney stopped it with chair shots. Joel Gertner got involved by hitting Mahoney with a chair and threw matches at him. Mahoney blasted him with a fireball, which distracted Mahoney enough for Dudleys to hit him with a 3D to retain the titles.

Next, Super Crazy competed against Taka Michinoku. Michinoku nailed a Michinoku Driver but was unable to cover Crazy due to a knee injury. Michinoku attempted another Michinoku Driver on Crazy but Crazy countered with a tornado DDT. Crazy nailed a sitout powerbomb to Michinoku for the win.

In the following match, Little Guido took on Yoshihiro Tajiri. Tajiri put Guido in a tree of woe and dropkicked Guido in the corner and then hit a brainbuster for the win.

Next, Tommy Dreamer took on Lance Storm. Dreamer hit a Dreamer Driver to Storm from the top rope onto a table. Cyrus interfered in the match but Francine countered his interference. Dawn Marie got involved into a brawl with Francine. Dreamer hit a piledriver to Marie, allowing Storm to place a trashcan on Dreamer's head and hit a flying spinning heel kick to Dreamer for the win.

Later, Rob Van Dam defended the World Television Championship against Jerry Lynn. RVD hit a Van Daminator and a Five-Star Frog Splash on Lynn to retain the title. After the match, RVD showed respect to Lynn by giving him a "high five".

In the penultimate match, Shane Douglas was scheduled to compete against Justin Credible but Douglas was injured. Judge Jeff Jones came to confront Credible and brought out Sid Vicious as Douglas' replacement and Credible's opponent. Sid dominated Credible and was about to hit a powerbomb but Jason interfered but sustained a powerbomb by Sid. Credible caned Sid but Sid chokeslammed him. Sid then attempted to hit a powerbomb on Credible but Lance Storm broke it up and Sid chokeslammed him, which disqualified Credible. Credible threw powder in Sid's eyes and then Storm and Credible placed Sid on a table until Sabu showed up to attack Credible and Storm. Sabu placed Credible along with Sid on the table and hit an Air Sabu on the table, with Storm pulling Credible out of it and Sid being driven through the table. Credible and Storm retreated while Sabu and Sid were about to brawl with each other until security separated the two. Sid hit two powerbombs to Judge Jeff Jones in the ring.

=== Main event match ===
Dudley Boyz attacked several wrestlers backstage including Nova, Chris Chetti and Jack Victory as ordered by Joel Gertner, which led to a match between Taz and Dudleys for the World Heavyweight Championship in the main event. D-Von Dudley injured his hand while attacking Chetti, so Buh Buh Ray Dudley challenged Taz for the title. Taz declared it to be a Falls Count Anywhere match. D-Von interfered in the match and Dudley Boyz hit a 3D II to Taz for the near-fall. Dudleys attempted another 3D but Taz countered by hitting a DDT to D-Von and drove Buh Buh through a table with a T-Bone Tazplex. Taz followed by applying a Tazmission on Buh Buh to retain the title.

== Reception ==
John Molinaro of the SLAM! Sports section of Canadian Online Explorer rated the event 7.5 out of 10 and wrote "Heyman was able to pull off a respectable show that was far better than the recent PPV efforts of the WWF and WCW. Heyman, displaying the resiliency that he has become so famous for, delivered a respectable and entertaining show as ECW presented its annual Hardcore Heaven spectacular last night on PPV."

Arnold Furious of Wrestling Recaps wrote "Started badly and ended badly but was really very good in the middle. Unusual for a PPV to be like that and normally a bad main event will let you down but I consider RVD-Lynn to be the main event so in this case the score isn’t affected."

Dylan Diot of 411Mania rated it 6 and wrote "ECW was no long a unique and edgy product by this point. WWF had successful incorporated elements of ECW into their product so everything ECW was doing was suddenly coming across as a second rate WWF product. They took cheat shots throughout the PPV about what the WWF and WCW was doing while putting on the same overbooked segments and matches that the other two companies that they were making fun on were doing. They had guys like RVD, Lynn, Tajiri, and Taz who were wrestling a totally different style than the other two companies were doing and could have shifted the style and focus of the company to keep them differentiated but chose to stick to their roots which ended up hurting them in the long run. This show was solid with a great RVD/Lynn match and some solid wrestling but you can see the magic of the company was starting to fade."

Scott Keith of 411Mania gave negative reviews on the event, citing Chris Candido's quick loss in the opening match, Taz versus Buh Buh Ray Dudley as the main event, Justin Credible's forced push and lack of mentioning Heat Wave and ECW's deal with TNN as the failure of the event.

== Results ==
No.	Results	Stipulations	Times
1^{D}	Skull Von Crush defeated Danny Doring (with Miss Congeniality)	Singles match	—
2	Taz (c) defeated Chris Candido (with Tammy Lynn Sytch)	Singles match for the ECW World Heavyweight Championship	1:10
3	The Dudley Boyz (Buh Buh Ray and D-Von) (c) (with Sign Guy Dudley and Joel Gertner) defeated Balls Mahoney and Spike Dudley	Tag team match for the ECW World Tag Team Championship	7:48
4	Super Crazy defeated Taka Michinoku	Singles match	8:28
5	Yoshihiro Tajiri defeated Little Guido (with Big Sal E. Graziano)	Singles match	11:06
6	Lance Storm (with Dawn Marie) defeated Tommy Dreamer (with Francine)	Singles match	13:40
7	Rob Van Dam (c) (with Bill Alfonso) defeated Jerry Lynn	Singles match for the ECW World Television Championship	26:57
8	Sid (with Judge Jeff Jones) vs. Justin Credible (with Jason and Jazz) ended in a no contest	Singles match	2:01
9	Taz (c) defeated Buh Buh Ray Dudley (with Sign Guy Dudley)	Falls Count Anywhere match for the ECW World Heavyweight Championship	12:17
(c) / – the champion(s) heading into the match; D / – this was a dark match

== See also ==
- 1999 in professional wrestling
