= 1999 in professional wrestling =

1999 in professional wrestling describes the year's events in the world of professional wrestling.

== List of notable promotions ==
These promotions held notable events in 1999.

Promotion Name	Abbreviation	Notes
All Japan Pro Wrestling	AJPW	
Catch Wrestling Association	CWA	
Consejo Mundial de Lucha Libre	CMLL	
Extreme Championship Wrestling	ECW	
Frontier Martial-Arts Wrestling	FMW	
Heroes of Wrestling	HOW	
International Wrestling Revolution Group	IWRG	
Lucha Libre AAA Worldwide	AAA	The "AAA" abbreviation has been used since the mid-1990s and had previously stood for the promotion's original name Asistencia Asesoría y Administración.
New Japan Pro-Wrestling	NJPW	
World Championship Wrestling	WCW	
World Wrestling Council	WWC	
World Wrestling Federation	WWF	

== Calendar of notable shows ==
=== January ===
Date	Promotion(s)	Event	Location	Main Event
January 4	NJPW	Wrestling World	Tokyo, Japan	Keiji Mutoh defeated Scott Norton (c) in a Singles match for the IWGP Heavyweight Championship
January 5	FMW	New Year Generation 1999: Day 1	Tokyo, Japan	Hisakatsu Oya vs. Mr. Gannosuke in a Singles match
January 10	ECW	Guilty as Charged	Kissimmee, Florida	Taz defeated Shane Douglas (c) by submission in a Singles match for the ECW World Heavyweight Championship
January 16	ECW	House Party	Philadelphia, Pennsylvania	Sid defeated Skull Von Krush in a Singles match
January 17	WCW: WCW; nWo	Souled Out	Charleston, West Virginia	Goldberg defeated Scott Hall in a Stun Gun Ladder match
January 24	WWF	Royal Rumble	Anaheim, California	Mr. McMahon won by last eliminating Stone Cold Steve Austin in a 30-man Royal Rumble match for a WWF Championship match at WrestleMania XV
(c) – denotes defending champion(s)

=== February ===
Date	Promotion(s)	Event	Location	Main Event
February 12	ECW	Crossing the Line '99	Queens, New York	Rob Van Dam (c) defeated Jerry Lynn by pinfall in a Singles match for the ECW World Television Championship
February 14	WWF	St. Valentine's Day Massacre: In Your House	Memphis, Tennessee	Stone Cold Steve Austin defeated Mr. McMahon by escaping the cage in a Steel Cage match to determine the #1 contender for the WWF Championship at WrestleMania XV
February 21	WCW: WCW; nWo	SuperBrawl IX	Oakland, California	Hollywood Hogan (c) defeated Ric Flair in a Singles match for the WCW World Heavyweight Championship
February 27	FMW	Over the Top Super Fighting Spirit Part Two: Day 7	Tokyo, Japan	Masato Tanaka vs. Tetsuhiro Kuroda in a Singles match
(c) – denotes defending champion(s)

=== March ===
Date	Promotion(s)	Event	Location	Main Event
March 7	AAA	Rey de Reyes	Naucalpan, Mexico	Perro Aguayo and Sangre Chicana defeated El Cobarde II in a Lucha de Apuesta, three-way "Hair vs. Hair" Bull Terrier Match
March 14	WCW: WCW; nWo	Uncensored	Louisville, Kentucky	Ric Flair defeated Hollywood Hogan (c) via Pinfall in a Barbed Wire Steel Cage First Blood match for the WCW World Heavyweight Championship
March 19	CMLL	Homenaje a Dos Leyendas	Mexico City, Mexico	Hijo del Santo and Negro Casas defeated Bestia Salvaje and Scorpio Jr. in a Best two-out-of-three falls Lucha de Apuestas, Mask and Hair vs. Hair and Mask match
March 21	ECW	Living Dangerously	Asbury Park, New Jersey	ECW World Heavyweight Champion Taz defeated FTW Heavyweight Champion Sabu in an Extreme Death match to unify the ECW and FTW World Heavyweight Championships
March 28	WWF	WrestleMania XV	Philadelphia, Pennsylvania	Stone Cold Steve Austin defeated The Rock (c) in a No Disqualification match for the WWF Championship with Mankind as special guest referee
March 29	FMW	Round Robin Tag League: Day 8	Tokyo, Japan	Hayabusa and Kodo Fuyuki vs. Masato Tanaka and Tetsuhiro Kuroda in a Singles match
(c) – denotes defending champion(s)

=== April ===
Date	Promotion(s)	Event	Location	Main Event
April 2	CMLL	43. Aniversario de Arena México	Mexico City, Mexico	Hijo del Santo and Negro Casas defeated Bestia Salvaje and Scorpio Jr. (c) by disqualification in a Best two-out-of-three falls tag team match for the CMLL World Tag Team Championship
April 3	ECW	CyberSlam	Philadelphia, Pennsylvania	The Dudley Boyz (Buh Buh Ray Dudley and D-Von Dudley) and Mr. Mustafa defeated New Jack and The Hardcore Chair Swingin' Freaks (Axl Rotten and Balls Mahoney) in an Ultimate Jeopardy match
April 11	WCW	Spring Stampede	Tacoma, Washington	Diamond Dallas Page defeated Ric Flair (c), Hollywood Hogan and Sting in a Four Corners match for the WCW World Heavyweight Championship with Randy Savage as special guest referee
April 20	FMW	Strongest Tag League: Day 1	Tokyo, Japan	Hayabusa and Kodo Fuyuki vs. Daisuke Ikeda and Muhammad Yone in a tag team match
April 25	WWF	Backlash: In Your House	Providence, Rhode Island	Stone Cold Steve Austin (c) defeated The Rock in a No Holds Barred match for the WWF Championship with Shane McMahon as special guest referee
(c) – denotes defending champion(s)

=== May ===
Date	Promotion(s)	Event	Location	Main Event
May 2	AJPW	Giant Baba Memorial Show	Tokyo, Japan	Mitsuharu Misawa defeated Vader in a Triple Crown title match
May 5	FMW	Strongest Tag League: Day 7	Tokyo, Japan	Kodo Fuyuki vs. Tetsuhiro Kuroda in a Singles match
May 9	WCW	Slamboree	St. Louis, Missouri	Kevin Nash defeated Diamond Dallas Page (c) in a Singles match for the WCW World Heavyweight Championship
May 15	Various	Break the Barrier	Philadelphia, Pennsylvania	Tom Brandi wins interpromotional battle royal
May 16	ECW	Hardcore Heaven	Poughkeepsie, New York	Taz (c) defeated Buh Buh Ray Dudley by submission in a Falls Count Anywhere match for the ECW World Heavyweight Championship
May 16	WWF	No Mercy (UK)	Manchester, England	Stone Cold Steve Austin (c) defeated Triple H and The Undertaker in a Anything Goes Triple Threat match for the WWF Championship
May 19	N/A	Second Annual Brian Pillman Memorial Show	Cincinnati, Ohio	Konnan and Rey Misterio Jr. defeated Chris Benoit and Dean Malenko in a tag team match
May 23	WWF	Over the Edge	Kansas City, Missouri	The Undertaker defeated Stone Cold Steve Austin (c) in a Singles match for the WWF Championship with Shane McMahon as special guest referee
(c) – denotes defending champion(s)

=== June ===
Date	Promotion(s)	Event	Location	Main Event
June 11	AAA	Triplemanía VII	Madero, Mexico	Perro Aguayo, Octagón and El Cobarde II defeated El Texano, Perro Aguayo Jr. and Sangre Chicana in a Best two-out-of-three falls six-man "Lucha Libre rules" tag team match
June 11	N/A	Fourth Annual Ilio DiPaolo Memorial Show	Buffalo, New York	Sting defeated Diamond Dallas Page in a Singles match
June 13	WCW	The Great American Bash	Baltimore, Maryland	Kevin Nash (c) defeated Randy Savage by disqualification in a Singles match for the WCW World Heavyweight Championship
June 15	FMW	Making of a New Legend: Day 2	Tokyo, Japan	Hayabusa, Masato Tanaka and Tetsuhiro Kuroda vs. Mr. Gannosuke, Yukihiro Kanemura and Hido in a Six-man tag team match
June 26	ECW	Hostile City Showdown	Philadelphia, Pennsylvania	The Impact Players (Justin Credible and Lance Storm) defeated Jerry Lynn and Sabu by pinfall in a "Non-sanctioned" tag team match
June 27	WWF	King of the Ring	Greensboro, North Carolina	Vince McMahon and Shane McMahon defeated Stone Cold Steve Austin in a 2 Vs 1 Handicap ladder match for control of the World Wrestling Federation
(c) – denotes defending champion(s)

=== July ===
Date	Promotion(s)	Event	Location	Main Event
July 11	WCW	Bash at the Beach	Fort Lauderdale, Florida	Randy Savage and Sid Vicious defeated Kevin Nash (c) and Sting in a Tag team match for the WCW World Heavyweight Championship
July 18	CMLL	Ruleta de la Muerte	Mexico City, Mexico	Shocker defeated Rey Bucanero via submission in a Lucha de Apuestas, mask vs. mask match
July 18	ECW	Heat Wave	Dayton, Ohio	Rob Van Dam and Jerry Lynn defeated Impact Players (Lance Storm and Justin Credible) in a tag team match
July 25	WWF	Fully Loaded	Buffalo, New York	Stone Cold Steve Austin (c) defeated The Undertaker in a First Blood match for the WWF Championship
July 30	N/A	Curtis Comes Home	Rostraver, Pennsylvania	The Triple Threat (Chris Benoit, Dean Malenko and Shane Douglas) defeated Chris Candido, Tim Horner and Tracy Smothers
July 31	FMW	Goodbye Hayabusa: Day 7	Tokyo, Japan	Team No Respect (Kodo Fuyuki, Koji Nakagawa and Gedo) defeated Hayabusa, Masato Tanaka and Tetsuhiro Kuroda in a Six-man tag team match
(c) – denotes defending champion(s)

=== August ===
Date	Promotion(s)	Event	Location	Main Event
August 14	WCW	Road Wild	Sturgis, South Dakota	Hulk Hogan (c) defeated Kevin Nash in a Retirement match for the WCW World Heavyweight Championship
August 14	WWC	WWC 26th Aniversario	Caguas, Puerto Rico	Abdullah the Butcher defeated The Tower of Doom in a "Lumberjacks with whips" match
August 20	FMW	Goodbye Hayabusa II: Haunted House	Tokyo, Japan	Masato Tanaka defeated Mr. Gannosuke (c) in a Singles match for the FMW Independent Heavyweight Championship with Kodo Fuyuki as special guest referee
August 22	WWF	SummerSlam	Minneapolis, Minnesota	Mankind defeated Stone Cold Steve Austin (c) and Triple H in a Triple Threat match for the WWF Championship with Jesse Ventura as special guest referee
August 23	FMW	Goodbye Hayabusa II: Hayabusa Graduation Ceremony	Tokyo, Japan	Hayabusa defeated Yukihiro Kanemura (c) in a Singles match for the FMW Brass Knuckles Heavyweight Championship
August 25	FMW	Goodbye Hayabusa II: Last Match	Sapporo, Japan	Hayabusa (c) defeated Mr. Gannosuke in a Singles match for the FMW Brass Knuckles Heavyweight Championship
August 26	ECW	The Last Show at the Madhouse	Queens, New York	Raven and Tommy Dreamer defeated the Dudley Boyz (Buh Buh Ray Dudley and D-Von Dudley) (c) by pinfall in a Tag team match for the ECW World Tag Team Championship
(c) – denotes defending champion(s)

=== September ===
Date	Promotion(s)	Event	Location	Main Event
September 12	WCW	Fall Brawl	Winston-Salem, North Carolina	Sting defeated Hulk Hogan (c) in a Singles match for the WCW World Heavyweight Championship
September 17	AAA	Verano de Escándalo	Mexico City, Mexico	Heavy Metal and Octagón defeated Jaque Mate and Kick Boxer in a Steel cage Lucha de Apuestas, "loser loses mask or hair" match
September 19	ECW	Anarchy Rulz	Villa Park, Illinois	Rob Van Dam (c) defeated Balls Mahoney in a Singles match for the ECW World Television Championship
September 24	CMLL	CMLL 66th Anniversary Show	Mexico City, Mexico	Mr. Niebla defeated Shocker by submission in a Best two-out-of-three falls Lucha de Apuestas mask vs. mask match
September 24	FMW	Making of a New Legend III: Day 6	Tokyo, Japan	H, Tetsuhiro Kuroda, Flying Kid Ichihara and Yoshinori Sasaki vs. "Hayabusa", Koji Nakagawa, Gedo and Chocoball Mukai in an eight-man tag team match
September 26	WWF	Unforgiven	Charlotte, North Carolina	Triple H defeated Big Show, The British Bulldog, Kane, Mankind and The Rock in a Six-pack challenge for the vacant WWF Championship with Stone Cold Steve Austin as special outside enforcer
(c) – denotes defending champion(s)

=== October ===
Date	Promotion(s)	Event	Location	Main Event
October 2	N/A	Fourth Annual Eddie Gilbert Memorial Show	Vineland, New Jersey	Tommy Gilbert and Kronus defeated The Public Enemy (Rocco Rock and Johnny Grunge) in a tag team match
October 2	WWF	Rebellion	Birmingham, England	Triple H (c) defeated The Rock by escaping the cage in a Steel Cage match for the WWF Championship
October 10	HOW	Heroes of Wrestling	Bay St. Louis, Mississippi	Jim Neidhart and King Kong Bundy defeated Jake Roberts and Yokozuna in a tag team match
October 17	WWF	No Mercy	Cleveland, Ohio	Triple H (c) defeated Stone Cold Steve Austin in a Anything Goes match for the WWF Championship
October 24	WCW	Halloween Havoc	Paradise, Nevada	Goldberg defeated Sting (c) in a Singles match for the WCW World Heavyweight Championship
October 29	FMW	Making of a New Legend IV: Day 7	Tokyo, Japan	Masato Tanaka, Tetsuhiro Kuroda, Hisakatsu Oya and Ricky Fuji vs. Kodo Fuyuki, Kintaro Kanemura, Koji Nakagawa and Jado in an eight-man tag team match
(c) – denotes defending champion(s)

=== November ===
Date	Promotion(s)	Event	Location	Main Event
November 7	ECW	November to Remember	Buffalo, New York	Rhino and Impact Players (Justin Credible and Lance Storm) defeated Raven, Tommy Dreamer and The Sandman in a Six-man tag team match
November 14	WWF	Survivor Series	Detroit, Michigan	Big Show defeated Triple H (c) and The Rock in a Triple threat match for the WWF Championship
November 21	WCW	Mayhem	Toronto, Ontario, Canada	Bret Hart defeated Chris Benoit by submission in a Final for the vacant WCW World Heavyweight Championship
November 23	FMW	FMW 10th Anniversary Show	Yokohama, Japan	H defeated Hayabusa in a Singles match with Shawn Michaels as special guest referee
(c) – denotes defending champion(s)

=== December ===
Date	Promotion(s)	Event	Location	Main Event
December 4	CWA	Euro Catch Festival	Bremen, Germany	Franz Schumann (c) defeated Jesus Cristobal in a Singles match for the CWA World Middleweight Championship
December 10	AAA	Guerra de Titanes	Madero, Mexico	Octagón defeated Jaque Mate in a Lucha de Apuestas "mask vs. mask" street fight match
December 12	FMW	Making of a New Legend VI: Day 5	Tokyo, Japan	H and Mr. Gannosuke vs. Masato Tanaka and Tetsuhiro Kuroda in a tag team match
December 12	WWF	Armageddon	Sunrise, Florida	Triple H defeated Mr. McMahon in a No Holds Barred match
December 19	WCW	Starrcade	Washington, D.C.	Bret Hart (c) defeated Goldberg by submission in a No Disqualification match for the WCW World Heavyweight Championship
December 19	IWRG	Arena Naucalpan 22nd Anniversary Show	Naucalpan, State of Mexico	El Hijo del Santo defeated Scorpio Jr. in a Best two-out-of-three-falls "Millenium Cup" match
(c) – denotes defending champion(s)

== Notable events ==
- January 4 – Fingerpoke of Doom
- January 12 - Shawn Michaels announces retirement
- January 13 - Biography of Andre the Giant airs to highest ratings in A&E history
- February 19 – Bill Goldberg makes a $100,000 challenge to Steve Austin on The Tonight Show
- April 29 – WWF SmackDown pilot airs on UPN
- May 23 – Owen Hart dies during live broadcast of Over the Edge
- June 7 – Sable files a 110 million-dollar lawsuit against WWF
- June 21 – Owen's widow, Martha Hart files a wrongful death claim against WWF
- June 28 – Tatsumi Fujinami named president of NJPW
- July 1 – Chris Jericho signs contract with WWF
- July 12 – Jerry Lawler announces candidacy for mayor of Memphis, Tennessee
- August 26 - WWF SmackDown debuts on UPN
- August 27 – ECW on TNN debuts
- August 28 – WWF Jakked/Metal debuted on Broadcast syndication replacing WWE Shotgun Saturday Night
- September 10 – Eric Bischoff was fired from World Championship Wrestling (WCW)
- September 17 – Nicole Bass files lawsuit against WWF
- October 3 – Vince Russo and Ed Ferrera become writers for WCW
- October 5 - Darren Drozdov suffers career ending neck injury during WWF SmackDown taping
- October 22 - Beyond the Mat releases in theaters
- November 15-19 – A&E airs new documentaries on Steve Austin, Owen Hart & Mick Foley

== Accomplishments and tournaments ==
=== AAA ===
Tournaments	Winner	Date won	Notes
Rey de Reyes	Cibernético	March 7	

=== AJW ===
Accomplishment	Winner	Date won	Notes
Japan Grand Prix 1999	Manami Toyota	August 15	
Tag League The Best 1999	Manami Toyota and Miho Wakizawa	December 26	

=== AJPW ===
Accomplishment	Winner	Date won	Notes
Champion Carnival 1999	Kenta Kobashi	April 16	
World's Strongest Determination League 1999	Stan Hansen and Akira Taue	December 3	

=== WCW ===
Accomplishment	Winner	Date won	Notes
WCW United States Championship Tournament	Scott Steiner	April 11	
WCW World Heavyweight Championship Tournament	Bret Hart	November 21	

=== WWF ===
Accomplishment	Winner	Date won	Notes
Royal Rumble	Mr. McMahon	January 24	
King of the Ring	Billy Gunn	June 27	

== Awards and honors ==
=== Pro Wrestling Illustrated ===
Category	Winner
PWI Wrestler of the Year	Stone Cold Steve Austin
PWI Tag Team of the Year	Kane and X-Pac
PWI Match of the Year	The Rock vs. Mankind (Royal Rumble)
PWI Feud of the Year	Vince McMahon vs. Stone Cold Steve Austin
PWI Most Popular Wrestler of the Year	The Rock
PWI Most Hated Wrestler of the Year	Diamond Dallas Page
PWI Comeback of the Year	Eddie Guerrero
PWI Most Improved Wrestler of the Year	Jerry Lynn
PWI Most Inspirational Wrestler of the Year	Hulk Hogan
PWI Rookie of the Year	Shane McMahon
PWI Lifetime Achievement	Owen Hart
PWI Editor's Award	Debra

=== Wrestling Observer Newsletter ===
==== Wrestling Observer Newsletter Hall of Fame ====
Inductee
Lioness Asuka
Jushin Thunder Liger
Keiji Mutoh
Jim Ross

==== Wrestling Observer Newsletter awards ====
Category	Winner
Wrestler of the Year	Mitsuharu Misawa
Most Outstanding	Mitsuharu Misawa
Best Box Office Draw	The Rock
Feud of the Year	Stone Cold Steve Austin vs. Vince McMahon
Tag Team of the Year	Kenta Kobashi and Jun Akiyama
Most Improved	Vader
Best on Interviews	The Rock

== Title changes ==
=== ECW ===
ECW World Heavyweight Championship
Incoming champion – Shane Douglas
Date	Winner	Event/Show	Note(s)
January 10	Taz	Guilty as Charged	
September 19	Mike Awesome	Anarchy Rulz	This was a three way dance also involving Masato Tanaka
December 17	Masato Tanaka	ECW on TNN	
December 23	Mike Awesome	ECW on TNN	

ECW FTW Heavyweight Championship
Incoming champion – Sabu
Unsanctioned championship
Date	Winner	Event/Show	Note(s)
March 21	Taz	Living Dangerously	
March 21	Retired	Living Dangerously	

ECW World Television Championship
Incoming champion – Rob Van Dam
Date	Winner	Event/Show	Note(s)
No title changes

ECW World Tag Team Championship
Incoming champions – Sabu and Rob Van Dam
Date	Winner	Event/Show	Note(s)
April 17	The Dudley Boyz (Buh Buh Ray and D-Von Dudley)	Hardcore TV #313	
July 18	Spike Dudley and Balls Mahoney	Heat Wave	
August 13	The Dudley Boyz (Buh Buh Ray and D-Von Dudley)	Hardcore TV #330	
August 14	Spike Dudley and Balls Mahoney	Hardcore TV #330	
August 26	The Dudley Boyz (Buh Buh Ray and D-Von Dudley)	ECW on TNN	
August 26	Tommy Dreamer and Raven	ECW on TNN	

=== FMW ===
FMW Brass Knuckles Heavyweight Championship
Incoming champion – Kodo Fuyuki
Date	Winner	Event/Show	Note(s)
May 18	Yukihiro Kanemura	FMW	
August 23	Hayabusa	FMW	
August 25	Retired	Goodbye Hayabusa II: Last Match	

FMW Brass Knuckles Tag Team Championship
Incoming champions – Hayabusa and Daisuke Ikeda
Date	Winner	Event/Show	Note(s)
January	Vacant	N/A	
May 3	Masato Tanaka and Tetsuhiro Kuroda	Strongest Tag League Tour	
June 13	Team No Respect (Koji Nakagawa and Gedo)	Making of a New Legend Tour	

FMW Independent World Junior Heavyweight Championship
Incoming champion – Kodo Fuyuki
Date	Winner	Event/Show	Note(s)
May 18	Masato Tanaka	Goodbye Hayabusa II: Haunted House	
August 25	Retired	N/A	

FMW Hardcore Championship
(Title created)
Date	Winner	Event/Show	Note(s)
September 24	Kintaro Kanemura	Making of a New Legend III tour	

=== NJPW ===
IWGP Heavyweight Championship
Incoming champion – Scott Norton
Date	Winner	Event/Show	Note(s)
January 4	Keiji Mutoh	Wrestling World 1999	
December 10	Genichiro Tenryu	Battle Final 1999	

IWGP Tag Team Championship
Incoming champions – Genichiro Tenryu and Shiro Koshinaka
Date	Winner	Event/Show	Note(s)
January 4	Tencozy (Hiroyoshi Tenzan and Satoshi Kojima)	Wrestling World 1999	
March 22	Cho-Ten (Kensuke Sasaki and Shiro Koshinaka)	Hyper Battle 1999	
June 27	The Mad Dogs (Michiyoshi Ohara and Tatsutoshi Goto)	Summer Struggle 1999	
August 28	Manabu Nakanishi and Yuji Nagata	Jingu Climax	

IWGP Junior Heavyweight Championship
Incoming champion – Jushin Thunder Liger
Date	Winner	Event/Show	Note(s)
March 17	Koji Kanemoto	Live event	
August 28	Kendo Kashin	Live event	
October 11	Jushin Thunder Liger	Final Dome	
November 29	Juventud Guerrera	Nitro	
December 6	Jushin Thunder Liger	Nitro	

IWGP Junior Heavyweight Tag Team Championship
Incoming champions – Shinjiro Otani and Tatsuhito Takaiwa
Date	Winner	Event/Show	Note(s)
January 4	Dr. Wagner, Jr. and Kendo Kashin	Wrestling World 1999	
April 10	The Great Sasuke and Jushin Thunder Liger	Strong Style Symphony	
July 13	Shinjiro Otani and Tatsuhito Takaiwa	Summer Struggle 1999	

=== WCW ===
WCW World Heavyweight Championship
Incoming champion – Kevin Nash
Date	Winner	Event/Show	Note(s)
January 4	Hollywood Hulk Hogan	Nitro	This was The Fingerpoke of Doom.
March 14	Ric Flair	Uncensored	This was a First Blood barbed wire steel cage match.
April 11	Diamond Dallas Page	Spring Stampede	This was a four corners match, also involving Sting and Hollywood Hulk Hogan. Randy Savage was the special guest referee.
April 26	Sting	Nitro	WWE.com mistakenly lists Sting's reign as lasting from April 26, 1999 to April 29, 1999, despite this and the following match's descriptions stating that this reign began and ended on the same night.
April 26	Diamond Dallas Page	Nitro	This was a four corners match, also involving Kevin Nash and Goldberg. WWE recognizes DDP's reign as lasting 14 days.
May 9	Kevin Nash	Slamboree	
July 11	Randy Savage	Bash at the Beach	This was a tag team match with Savage and Sid Vicious facing Kevin Nash and Sting where if someone pinned Nash or made him submit, that person would become champion. Savage pinned Nash to win the title.
July 12	Hollywood Hulk Hogan	Nitro	Hollywood Hogan reverted to his Hulkamania character midway through this reign.
September 12	Sting	Fall Brawl	
October 25	Vacated	Nitro	Sting was stripped of the title after losing an unsanctioned match against Goldberg and attacked referee Charles Robinson at Halloween Havoc.
November 21	Bret Hart	Mayhem	Defeated Chris Benoit in a tournament final for the vacant title.
December 20	Vacated	Nitro	Bret Hart vacated the title due to the controversial end to a match with Goldberg at Starrcade.
December 20	Bret Hart	Nitro	Defeated Goldberg in a rematch for the vacant title.

WCW Cruiserweight Championship
Incoming champion – Billy Kidman
Date	Winner	Event/Show	Note(s)
March 15	Rey Misterio, Jr.	Nitro	
April 19	Psychosis	Nitro	This was a four-way match also involving Juventud Guerrera and Blitzkrieg
April 26	Rey Misterio, Jr.	Nitro	
August 19	Lenny Lane	Thunder	
October 4	Vacant	Nitro	
October 4	Psychosis	Nitro	
October 4	Disco Inferno	Nitro	
November 21	Evan Karagias	Mayhem	
December 19	Madusa	Starrcade	Became the first female Cruiserweight champion

WCW United States Heavyweight Championship
Incoming champion – Bret Hart
Date	Winner	Event/Show	Note(s)
February 8	Roddy Piper	Nitro	
February 21	Scott Hall	SuperBrawl IX	
March 18	Vacant	Thunder	Scott Hall was stripped of the title by WCW President Ric Flair
April 11	Scott Steiner	Spring Stampede	
July 5	Vacant	Nitro	Scott Steiner was stripped of the title by WCW President Ric Flair
July 5	David Flair	Nitro	
August 9	Chris Benoit	Nitro	
September 12	Sid Vicious	Fall Brawl	
October 24	Goldberg	Halloween Havoc	
October 25	Bret Hart	Nitro	
November 8	Scott Hall	Nitro	
December 19	Chris Benoit	Starrcade	
December 20	Jeff Jarrett	Nitro	

WCW Hardcore Championship
(Title created)
Date	Winner	Event/Show	Note(s)
November 21	Norman Smiley	Mayhem	Defeated Brian Knobs in a tournament final to become inaugural champion

WCW World Television Championship
Incoming champion – Scott Steiner
Date	Winner	Event/Show	Note(s)
March 14	Booker T	Uncensored	
May 9	Rick Steiner	Slamboree	
September 13	Chris Benoit	Nitro	
October 24	Rick Steiner	Halloween Havoc	
November 21	Scott Hall	Mayhem	
November 29	Vacant	Nitro	Vacated after Scott Hall threw the belt in a trash can

WCW World Tag Team Championship
Incoming champions – Rick Steiner and Kenny Kaos
Date	Winner	Event/Show	Note(s)
January 4	Vacant	Nitro	WCW vacated the championship after Steiner sustained a legitimate injury
February 21	Barry Windham and Curt Hennig	SuperBrawl IX	
March 14	Chris Benoit and Dean Malenko	Uncensored	
March 29	Rey Misterio, Jr. and Billy Kidman	Nitro	
May 9	Raven and Perry Saturn	Slamboree	
May 31	The Jersey Triad (Diamond Dallas Page, Bam Bam Bigelow and Chris Kanyon)	Nitro	
June 8	Chris Benoit and Perry Saturn	Thunder	Aired on tape delay on June 10.
June 13	The Jersey Triad (Diamond Dallas Page, Bam Bam Bigelow and Chris Kanyon)	The Great American Bash	
August 14	Harlem Heat (Booker T and Stevie Ray)	Road Wild	
August 23	The West Texas Rednecks (Barry Windham and Kendall Windham)	Nitro	
September 12	Harlem Heat (Booker T and Stevie Ray)	Fall Brawl	
October 18	The Filthy Animals (Konnan and Rey Misterio Jr.)	Nitro	
October 24	Vacant	Halloween Havoc	WCW vacated the titles after Misterio Jr. sustained a legitimate leg injury
October 24	Harlem Heat (Booker T and Stevie Ray)	Halloween Havoc	This was a street fight also involving The First Family
October 25	The Filthy Animals (Konnan and Billy Kidman)	Nitro	
November 22	Creative Control (Gerald and Patrick)	Nitro	
December 7	Bret Hart and Goldberg	Thunder	Aired on tape delay on December 9.
December 13	The Outsiders (Kevin Nash and Scott Hall)	Nitro	
December 27	Vacant	Nitro	

=== WWF ===
WWF Championship
Incoming champion – Mankind
Date	Winner	Event/Show	Note(s)
January 24	The Rock	Royal Rumble	This was an "I Quit" match, which The Rock won by knocking Mankind unconscious while someone backstage played an audio recording of Mankind saying "I quit" while The Rock placed the microphone against his face. WWE recognizes The Rock's reign as lasting 7 days, ending on January 31, 1999, when the following match aired on tape delay.
January 26	Mankind	Halftime Heat	This was an Empty Arena match that aired on tape delay as a special during halftime of Super Bowl XXXIII on January 31, 1999. WWE recognizes Mankind's reign as lasting 15 days, beginning on January 31.
February 15	The Rock	Raw Is War	This was a ladder match.
March 28	Stone Cold Steve Austin	WrestleMania XV	This was a no disqualification match with Mankind as the special guest referee.
May 23	The Undertaker	Over the Edge	Both Vince McMahon and Shane McMahon were special guest referees.
June 28	Stone Cold Steve Austin	Raw Is War	
August 22	Mankind	SummerSlam	This was a triple threat match also involving Triple H. Jesse Ventura was the guest referee.
August 23	Triple H	Raw Is War	Shane McMahon was the guest referee. WWE recognizes Triple H's reign as lasting 24 days, ending on September 16, 1999, when the following episode aired on tape delay.
September 14	Vince McMahon	SmackDown!	Shane McMahon was the guest referee. WWE recognizes Vince's reign as lasting 4 days, beginning on September 16, 1999, when the episode aired on tape delay.
September 20	Vacated	Raw Is War	Vince McMahon vacated the title.
September 26	Triple H	Unforgiven	This was a six-pack challenge match also involving The Rock, Mankind, Big Show, The British Bulldog and Kane. Stone Cold Steve Austin was the special outside enforcer.
November 14	Big Show	Survivor Series	This was a triple threat match, also involving The Rock.

WWF Intercontinental Championship
Incoming champion – Ken Shamrock
Date	Winner	Event/Show	Note(s)
February 14	Val Venis	St. Valentine's Day Massacre: In Your House	Billy Gunn was the special guest referee
March 15	Road Dogg	Raw Is War	
March 29	Goldust	Raw Is War	
April 12	The Godfather	Raw Is War	
May 25	Jeff Jarrett	Raw Is War	Aired on tape delay on May 31.
July 24	Edge	House show	
July 25	Jeff Jarrett	Fully Loaded	
July 27	D'Lo Brown	Raw Is War	Aired on tape delay on August 2.
August 22	Jeff Jarrett	SummerSlam	
October 17	Chyna	No Mercy	
December 12	Chris Jericho	Armageddon	

WWF Light Heavyweight Championship
Incoming champion – Gillberg
Date	Winner	Event/Show	Note(s)
No title changes

WWF Women's Championship
Incoming champion – Sable
Date	Winner	Event/Show	Note(s)
May 10	Debra	Raw Is War	
June 8	Ivory	Raw Is War	Aired on tape delay on June 14.
October 17	The Fabulous Moolah	No Mercy	
October 25	Ivory	Raw Is War	
December 12	The Kat	Armageddon	This was a fatal four-way evening gown pool match, also involving Jacqueline and B.B.

WWF European Championship
Incoming champion – X-Pac
Date	Winner	Event/Show	Note(s)
February 15	Shane McMahon	Raw Is War	
March 30	Deactivated	Sunday Night Heat	Aired on tape delay on April 4.
June 21	Mideon	Raw Is War	
July 25	D'Lo Brown	Fully Loaded	
August 22	Jeff Jarrett	SummerSlam	
August 23	Mark Henry	Raw Is War	
September 26	D'Lo Brown	Unforgiven	
October 26	The British Bulldog	SmackDown!	Aired on tape delay on October 28.
December 12	Val Venis	Armageddon	This was a Triple Threat match also involving D'Lo Brown.

WWF Tag Team Championship
Incoming champions – The Corporation (Big Boss Man and Ken Shamrock)
Date	Winner	Event/Show	Note(s)
January 25	Jeff Jarrett and Owen Hart	Raw Is War	
March 30	Kane and X-Pac	Raw Is War	Aired on tape delay on April 5.
May 25	The Acolytes (Bradshaw and Faarooq)	Raw Is War	Aired on tape delay on May 31.
June 29	The Hardy Boyz (Matt and Jeff Hardy)	Raw Is War	Aired on tape delay on July 5.
July 25	The Acolytes (Bradshaw and Faarooq)	Fully Loaded	
August 9	Kane and X-Pac	Raw Is War	
August 22	The Unholy Alliance (Big Show and The Undertaker)	SummerSlam	
August 30	The Rock 'n' Sock Connection (Mankind and The Rock)	Raw Is War	
September 7	The Unholy Alliance (Big Show and The Undertaker)	SmackDown!	Aired on tape delay on September 9.
September 20	The Rock 'n' Sock Connection (Mankind and The Rock)	Raw Is War	
September 21	The New Age Outlaws (Billy Gunn and Road Dogg)	SmackDown!	Aired on tape delay on September 23.
October 12	The Rock 'n' Sock Connection (Mankind and The Rock)	SmackDown!	Aired on tape delay on October 14.
October 18	The Holly Cousins (Hardcore and Crash Holly)	Raw Is War	
November 2	Mankind and Al Snow	SmackDown!	Aired on tape delay on November 4.
November 8	The New Age Outlaws (Billy Gunn and Road Dogg)	Raw Is War	

WWF Hardcore Championship
Incoming champion – Road Dogg
Date	Winner	Event/Show	Note(s)
February 14	Vacant	St. Valentine's Day Massacre: In Your House	
February 14	Bob Holly	St. Valentine's Day Massacre: In Your House	
March 15	Billy Gunn	Raw Is War	
March 28	Hardcore Holly	WrestleMania XV	This was a triple threat hardcore match also involving Al Snow
April 25	Al Snow	Backlash: In Your House	
July 25	Big Boss Man	Fully Loaded	
August 22	Al Snow	SummerSlam	
August 24	Big Boss Man	SmackDown!	Aired on tape delay on August 26.
September 7	The British Bulldog	SmackDown!	Aired on tape delay on September 9.
September 7	Al Snow	SmackDown!	The British Bulldog awarded the title to Al Snow; Aired on tape delay on September 9.
October 12	Big Boss Man	SmackDown!	This was a triple threat match also involving Big Show; Aired on tape delay on October 14.

== Debuts ==
- Uncertain debut date

- Tank Abbott
- Carlito Caribbean Cool
- Primo Colón
- April Hunter
- Towel Boy
- Lance Cade
- Jasmin St. Claire

- February 6 – Eddie Valentine
- March 2 – Hub
- April 14 - Ai Fujita
- May 8 - GENTARO
- July 11 - Hikaru (All Japan Women's)
- August 10 - Daisuke Sekimoto
- October 4

- Bryan Danielson
- Hartley Jackson

- October 8 – Brian Kendrick
- October 10

- Hiroshi Tanahashi
- Katsuyori Shibata

- October 23 - Saika Takeuchi (GAEA)
- October 30 – Dave Bautista
- November 5 – John Cena
- November 11 - Tygress
- November 29 - Kaori Yoneyama
- December 8 - Ayako Seki (All Japan Women's)

== Retirements ==
- Marianna Komlos (1999)
- Kenny Kaos (1995–1999)
- The Gambler (1990-1999)
- Hercules (1979–1999)
- Jim Brunzell (1972–1999)
- Johnny Rodz (1964–1999)
- Mike Shaw (1980-1999, returned to wrestling in 2006 and wrestled his last match 2009)
- Steve McMichael (1995–1999)
- Takashi Ishikawa (November 8, 1977 – January 1999)
- Wayne Bloom (1988–1999)
- Yuji Yasuraoka (January 5, 1992 – June 20, 1999)

== Births ==
- January 15 - Niko Vance
- January 16 – Ryoya Tanaka
- January 23 – Yuto Kikuchi
- January 30 - Shiloh Hill
- February 12 - Jaida Parker
- February 17 – Jimmy Lloyd
- February 19 – Aigle Blanc
- March 11 – Takumi Baba
- March 18 – Moka Miyamoto
- March 20 - Damon Kemp
- March 27 – Jun Tonsho
- May 1 – Tiffany Stratton
- May 4 – Hook
- May 11 - Zaria (wrestler)
- May 15 – Yuma Anzai
- May 25 - Myles Borne
- June 13 – Takahiro Katori
- June 18 - Jordan Oliver (professional wrestler)
- July 13 - Izzi Dame
- July 28 – Riko Kawahata
- August 5 - Nikkita Lyons
- August 26 - Sol Ruca
- October 2 – Skye Blue
- October 11 - Tank Ledger
- December 29 - Trill London

== Deaths ==
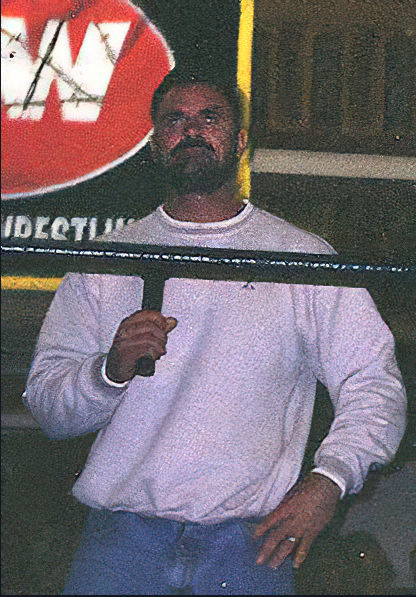
Rick Rude

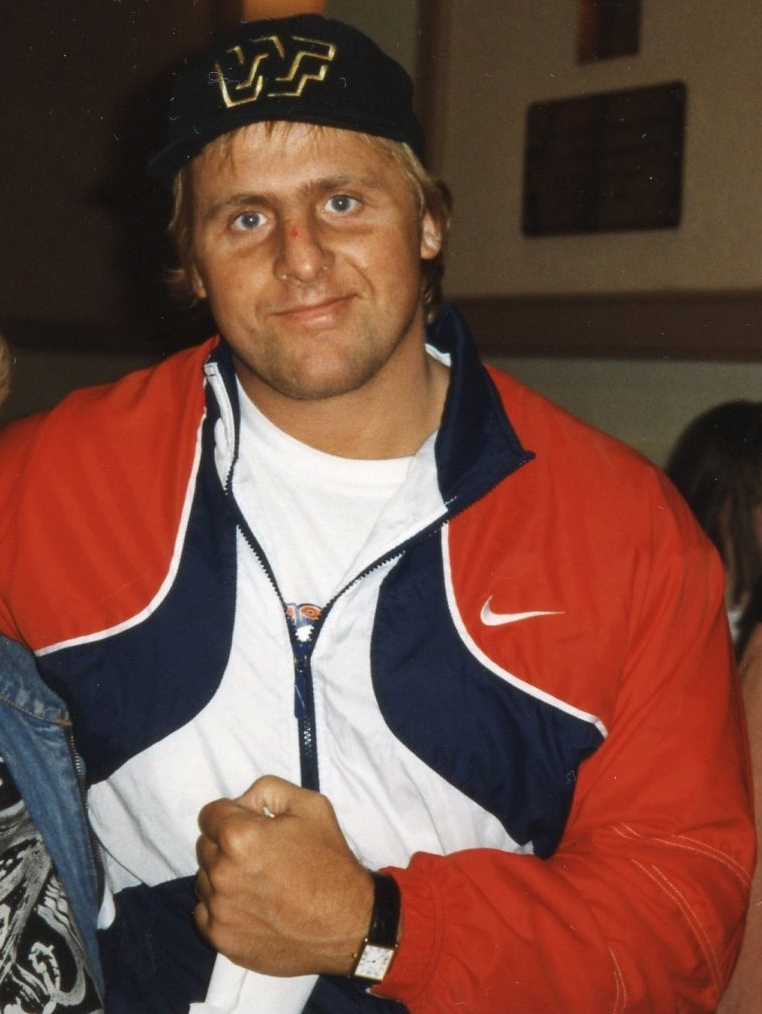
Owen Hart

- January 4 - Cyclone Anaya, 81
- January 6 - Joe Christie (wrestler), 82
- January 31 – Giant Baba, 61
- February 9 - Butch Levy, 77
- February 23 – The Renegade, 33
- March 1 - Satoshi Hasegawa, 22
- March 13 – Kurt Von Hess, 56
- March 29 - Herb Welch, 91
- April 9 – Emiko Kado, 23
- April 20 – Rick Rude, 40
- May 1 – Jos LeDuc, 54
- May 23 – Owen Hart, 34
- June 29 - Walter Johnson (defensive tackle), 56
- July 19 - Cavernario Galindo, 75
- August 7 – Jonathan Boyd, 54
- August 9 – Jackie Sato, 41
- September 8 – Brian Hildebrand, 37
- October 6 – Gorilla Monsoon, 62
- October 25 - George Becker, 85
- October 27 - José Aarón Alvarado Nieves, 33
- November 9:
  - Wolf Ruvinskis, 78
  - Joe Scarpello, 76
- November 13 – Tony Rumble, 43
- November 27 – Hiro Matsuda, 62
- December 3:
  - Jerry Monti, 59
  - Tami Mauriello, 76

== See also ==
- List of WCW pay-per-view events
- List of WWF pay-per-view events
- List of FMW supercards and pay-per-view events
- List of ECW supercards and pay-per-view events
