= Break the Barrier =

1999 professional wrestling event

- The "ECW Arena" where the event was held
- Promotion(s): Allied Powers Wrestling Federation; Combat Zone Wrestling; Extreme Championship Wrestling; Independent Pro Wrestling; Independent Professional Wrestling Alliance; Maryland Championship Wrestling; Music City Wrestling; NWA New Jersey; New Dimension Wrestling; South's Greatest Wrestling Fans; Steel City Wrestling; World Legion Wrestling; World Wrestling Organization
- Date: May 15, 1999
- City: Philadelphia, Pennsylvania
- Venue: Viking Hall

Break the Barrier was a professional wrestling supercard event held at Viking Hall, better known as the "ECW Arena", in Philadelphia, Pennsylvania on May 15, 1999. The event was organized by the founders of Scoopswrestling.com, Al Isaacs, Remy Arteaga and Barbi Bistrowitz, and brought together some of the top independent wrestlers from around the country. It was one of the biggest interpromotional events in the United States and saw the participation of 13 independent promotions including Allied Powers Wrestling Federation, Combat Zone Wrestling, Extreme Championship Wrestling, Independent Pro Wrestling, Independent Professional Wrestling Alliance, Maryland Championship Wrestling, Music City Wrestling, NWA New Jersey, New Dimension Wrestling, South's Greatest Wrestling Fans, Steel City Wrestling, World Legion Wrestling, and World Wrestling Organization. Pro Wrestling Illustrated has called it "one of the greatest Supercards of all time".

== Event ==
Tom Brandi won the main event, an interpromotional battle royal, and was presented a trophy from the promoter Al Isaacs. Instead of accepting the award, Brandi attacked Isaac and powerbombed him through a table. The undercard featured an interpromotional First Blood match between Fang (Allied Powers Wrestling Federation) and Blade Boudreaux (South's Greatest Wrestling Fans). Ten minutes into the match, Abdullah the Butcher came out and attacked both men. Abdullah cut Fang with a fork and then placed him into a coffin, which he rolled backstage.

Four new champions were also crowned at the event. Mike Quackenbush defeated Lou Marconi and Don Montoya to become the first SCW Lord of the Dance Champion, Nick Gage defeated Justice Pain in an impromptu staple gun match to become the first CZW Interpromotional Hardcore Champion, Scab defeated Natrone Steele in a ladder match to become the WWO Heavyweight Champion, and Stevie Richards defeated Jimmy Cicero and Tom Brandi in a Three Way Dance to win the APWF Heavyweight Championship. The event also saw the reunion of The Headbangers, and Shane Douglas, who was scheduled to represent Extreme Championship Wrestling (ECW), delivering a controversial "shoot" interview which ended with him quitting ECW one day before its Hardcore Heaven pay-per-view.

== Show results ==
No.	Results	Stipulations
1	Stevie Richards defeated Tom Brandi and Jimmy Cicero (c)	Three Way Dance for the APWF Heavyweight Championship
2	Derrick Stone (c) defeated Steve Sharpe	Falls Count Anywhere match for the WLW Heavyweight Championship
3	Rick Link (c) vs. Manny Fernandez ended in a double disqualification	Singles match for the NDW Brass Knuckles Championship
4	The Pitbulls (Pitbull #1 and Pitbull #2) defeated Phi DeKappa U (Biff and Chaz Wentworth) (c)	Tag team match for the IPW Tag Team Championship
5	Headbanger Mosh (c) defeated Romeo Valentino	Singles match for the MCW Heavyweight Championship
6	The Tennessee Volunteerz (Reno Riggins and Steven Dunn) defeated The Badstreet Boyz (Christian York and Joey Matthews)	Tag team match
7	Scab defeated Natrone Steele (c)	Ladder match for the WWO Heavyweight Championship
8	Cueball Carmichael (c) defeated Julio Sanchez	Singles match for the IPWA Heavyweight Championship
9	Mike Quackenbush defeated Lou Marconi (with "Hot $hot" Drew Lazario) and Don Montoya	Three Way Dance for the inaugural SCW Lord of the Dance Championship
10	Fang defeated Blade Boudreaux	APWF vs. SGWF First Blood match
11	Nick Gage defeated Justice Pain	Staple gun match for the inaugural CZW Interpromotional Hardcore Championship
12	Tom Brandi defeated Derek Stone, Maxx Justice, Reno Riggins, Rick Link Scab, and Steven Dunn	Interpromotional battle royal
(c) / – the champion(s) heading into the match

== See also ==
- 1999 in professional wrestling
