= November to Remember (1999) =

1999 Extreme Championship Wrestling pay-per-view event

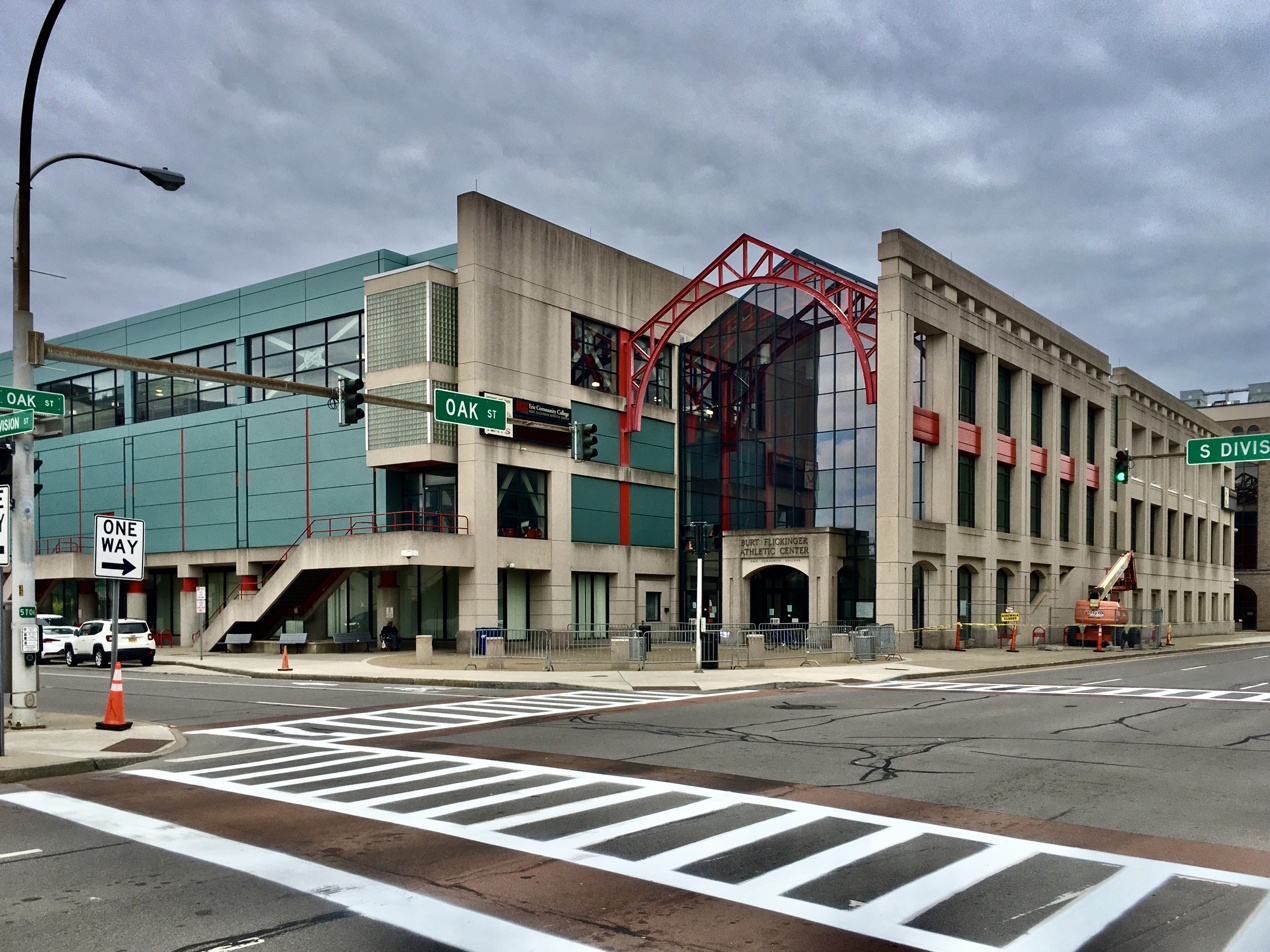
- The Burt Flickinger Center in Buffalo, New York.
- Promotion: Extreme Championship Wrestling
- Date: November 7, 1999
- City: Buffalo, New York, United States
- Venue: Burt Flickinger Center
- Attendance: 3,000
- Buy rate: 80,000

Pay-per-view chronology
← Previous; Anarchy Rulz	Next → Guilty as Charged

November to Remember chronology
← Previous; 1998	Next → 2000

November to Remember (1999) was the seventh annual November to Remember professional wrestling pay-per-view (PPV) event produced by Extreme Championship Wrestling (ECW). The event took place on November 7, 1999 from the Burt Flickinger Center in Buffalo, New York. It was the third to be broadcast on pay-per-view.

Mike Awesome versus Masato Tanaka was included on the 2012 WWE DVD and Blu-ray release ECW Unreleased: Vol 1. Jerry Lynn versus Yoshihiro Tajiri versus Super Crazy was included on the 2013 WWE DVD and Blu-ray release ECW Unreleased: Vol 2.

The main event was a six-man tag team match originally billed as Tommy Dreamer, Raven and a mystery partner against Impact Players (Lance Storm and Justin Credible) and a mystery partner. The returning Sandman was revealed as Dreamer and Raven's partner and Rhino was revealed as Impact Players's partner. Rhino and Impact Players won. The World Heavyweight and World Television Championships were defended on the event, with Mike Awesome and Rob Van Dam retaining the World Heavyweight and World Television Championships against Masato Tanaka and Taz respectively.

== Storylines ==
The professional wrestling matches at November to Remember involved professional wrestlers performing as characters in scripted events pre-determined by the hosting promotion, ECW. Storylines between the characters played out on ECW's television programs, Hardcore TV and ECW on TNN.

On the October 16, 1999 edition of Hardcore TV, Impact Players (Justin Credible and Lance Storm) bragged about ridding the company of Shane Douglas, Sid Vicious, and The Sandman, before claiming their last remaining challenge was to defeat dysfunctional World Tag Team Champions Tommy Dreamer and Raven. Raven cost Dreamer numerous singles matches, including a bout against Storm on the October 29 episode of ECW on TNN. The Impact Players would double team both champions after they fought among themselves. Storm's valet Dawn Marie also targeted Dreamer's valet Francine, attempting to unseat her as ECW's top female. On the October 30, 1999 edition of Hardcore TV, it was revealed the Impact Players and a mystery partner would face Dreamer, Raven, and a mystery partner at November to Remember.

At the September pay-per-view Anarchy Rulz, Mike Awesome defeated Masato Tanaka and champion Taz in a three-way dance to win the World Heavyweight Championship after last eliminating Tanaka. On the October 9 episode of Hardcore TV, Joey Styles announced that Awesome would defend his title against Tanaka at November to Remember. Awesome made numerous title defenses on television leading up to the pay-per-view.

On the October 16, 1999 edition of Hardcore TV, Joey Styles announced that Rob Van Dam would defend his World Television Championship against Taz at November to Remember in a match demanded by fans. On the October 29 episode of ECW on TNN, Taz lost a match to Sabu and then attacked Van Dam from behind with the Tazmission.

On the October 15 episode of ECW on TNN, Steve Corino interrupted Jerry Lynn's backstage promo and then lured him into a locker room attack by Yoshihiro Tajiri, with Tajiri targeting Lynn's broken ribs. Tajiri defeated Lynn on the October 30 episode of Hardcore TV after spraying red mist into Lynn's face, leading to a three-way dance between Lynn, Tajiri and Super Crazy at November to Remember.

On the October 29 episode of ECW on TNN, The Hardcore Chair Swingin' Freaks (Balls Mahoney and Axl Rotten) saved Nova from an attack by the Da Baldies faction of Angel, Tony DeVito, and Vito LoGrasso. On the November 5 episode of Hardcore TV, a match was officially announced for November to Remember pitting Da Baldies against the Freaks and New Jack, with footage shown of P. N. News joining Da Baldies in beating down the Freaks at the ECW Arena. New Jack attempted to make the save, only for Angel to staple him in the eye.

== Event ==
=== Preliminary matches ===
Before the pay per view, Danny Doring and Roadkill would defeat C. W. Anderson and "Wild" Bill Whiles in a dark match that would air on the November 13, 1999 episode of ECW Hardcore TV.

Simon Diamond and his bodyguard Dick Hertz cut a promo in the ring, leading to Jazz confronting Diamond and hitting a Jazz Stinger and Hertz executed an Emerald Flowsion on Jazz. Spike Dudley then drove Hertz with an Acid Drop and began a match with Diamond. Dudley executed an Acid Drop on Diamond to win the match. After the match, The Full Blooded Italians (Little Guido and Sal E. Graziano) came out to attack Dudley until Nova made the save, leading to a match between Nova and Guido taking place. Graziano interfered in the match by attempting a body avalanche to Nova in the corner but missed it and Nova nailed a tornado DDT, which distracted him enough for Guido to hit a Kiss of Death to win the match. FBI continued to assault Nova after the match until Chris Chetti made the save, only to get attacked by Danny Doring and Roadkill.

This was followed by a three-way dance, between Jerry Lynn, Super Crazy and Yoshihiro Tajiri. Lynn hit a cradle piledriver to Crazy and covered him for the pinfall until Tajiri broke the pinfall and then nailed a brainbuster to Crazy to eliminate him. Lynn and Tajiri continued the action until Lynn eventually nailed a cradle piledriver to win the match.

Next, New Jack and The Hardcore Chair Swingin' Freaks (Axl Rotten and Balls Mahoney) competed against Da Baldies (Spanish Angel, Tony DeVito, Vito LoGrasso and P. N. News) in a handicap match. During the match, both teams used several weapons against each other including computer keyboards and vacuum cleaners. Jack climbed up on a basketball backboard through a ladder and then leapt from the backboard onto a table on the Baldies. He then returned to the ring where he stapled LoGrasso but Angel hit him with a guitar for the victory.

Next, Sabu took on Chris Candido. Tammy Lynn Sytch tried to interfere on Candido's behalf until Sabu's manager Bill Alfonso put her on a table. Sabu then performed a diving leg drop on the table and Candido pushed Sytch away and got driven through the table. Sabu followed by executing an Arabian Facebuster on Candido and applied an Arabian Clutch to make Candido submit to the hold.

In the following match, Mike Awesome defended the World Heavyweight Championship against Masato Tanaka. After a back and forth action, Awesome nailed an Awesome Bomb to Tanaka from the top rope to retain the title.

In the penultimate match of the event, Rob Van Dam defended the World Television Championship against Taz. After a back and forth match, RVD nailed a leaping Van Daminator to Taz followed by a split-legged moonsault, which made Taz bleed for the mouth and then RVD executed a Five Star Frog Splash to retain the title.

=== Main event match ===
The main event was a six-man tag team match, in which Tommy Dreamer, Raven and their mystery partner was supposed to take on Rhino and Impact Players (Justin Credible and Lance Storm). The Sandman made his surprise return to ECW as the mystery tag team partner of Dreamer and Raven. Near the end of the match, the valets Francine and Dawn Marie got involved in a fight with each other. This distraction allowed Raven to accidentally hit Sandman with a Singapore cane, allowing Credible to hit a That's Incredible on Sandman to win the match.

== Reception ==
Arnold Furious of Wrestling Recaps wrote "They tried to squeeze too much into the early couple of matches and then blew the main event, which knocks this from thumbs up to more of a thumbs in the middle. Still it was a great way to finish a great year for ECW and was the best November to Remember to this point." He appreciated three of the matches, considering the three-way dance, the World Heavyweight Championship match and Sabu versus Candido matches to be the best matches of the night.

Scott Keith of 411Mania wrote "Another show, more of the same. A decent three-way dance, a pretty good Tanaka-Awesome match, some garbagy brawls, an overbooked mess to start the show…you might as well just call it Anarchy Rulz II and be totally upfront with it. Didn’t work half as well this time, though, although there was nothing brutally bad to really drag it below a mediocre rating. Still, there was nothing that really stood out, pretty much making this a November to Forget."

KB Wrestling Reviews staff wrote "how in the world is this supposed to be the main show of the year? It felt like it was missing about thirty minutes. The opening half hour is a massive mess and Taz being pissed off, the two more hardcore matches are forgettable at their best with Sabu and Candido being ok at best, the title matches had nothing of note at all, and the main event was entirely lackluster."

== Aftermath ==
New Jack and Hardcore Chair Swingin' Freaks continued their feud with Da Baldies after the event. On the November 19 episode of ECW on TNN, the Freaks defeated Baldies members P. N. News and Vito LoGrasso in a falls count anywhere match, in which the loser of the fall would be forced to leave ECW. LoGrasso was pinned and was forced to leave ECW as a result. Spanish Angel challenged New Jack to a street fight at a train station. The following week on ECW on TNN, Jack was attacked by Angel at a train station. On the November 28 episode of Hardcore TV, Angel and DeVito defeated the Freaks in a match. The feud continued on the following weeks as it would lead to a match between the two at Guilty as Charged.

The Sandman, Raven and Tommy Dreamer faced Rhino and The Impact Players in a rematch on the November 26 episode of ECW on TNN, where Rhino and Impact Players emerged victorious once again. The rivalry continued between both teams, leading to Impact Players receiving a title shot against Raven and Dreamer's World Tag Team Championship at Guilty as Charged.

Mike Awesome and Masato Tanaka continued their feud over the World Heavyweight Championship. The following month, on the December 24 episode of ECW on TNN, Tanaka defeated Awesome to win the title. However, Awesome defeated Tanaka in a rematch the following week to regain the title. After the match, Awesome was attacked by Spike Dudley with an Acid Drop but Judge Jeff Jones' interference led to Awesome attacking Dudley's girlfriend after she got involved by attacking Jones. This led to Awesome defending the title against Dudley at Guilty as Charged.

Taz would leave ECW after losing to Rob Van Dam at November to Remember and joined World Wrestling Federation, where he debuted at the 2000 Royal Rumble. He would return to ECW on the April 14, 2000 episode of ECW on TNN to challenge Mike Awesome for the World Heavyweight Championship.

== Results ==
No.	Results	Stipulations	Times
1^{D}	Danny Doring and Roadkill defeated C. W. Anderson and "Wild" Bill Whiles	Tag Team match	4:34
2	Spike Dudley defeated Simon Diamond (with Dick Hertz)	Singles match	2:59
3	Little Guido (with Sal E. Graziano) defeated Nova	Singles match	4:20
4	Jerry Lynn defeated Yoshihiro Tajiri (with Steve Corino and Jack Victory) and Super Crazy	Three-Way Dance	10:59
5	Da Baldies (Spanish Angel, Tony DeVito, Vito LoGrasso and P. N. News) defeated New Jack and The Hardcore Chair Swingin' Freaks (Axl Rotten and Balls Mahoney)	Handicap match	8:21
6	Sabu (with Bill Alfonso) defeated Chris Candido (with Tammy Lynn Sytch) via submission	Singles match	17:42
7	Mike Awesome (c) (with Judge Jeff Jones) defeated Masato Tanaka	Singles match for the ECW World Heavyweight Championship	12:26
8	Rob Van Dam (c) (with Bill Alfonso) defeated Taz	Singles match for the ECW World Television Championship	14:34
9	Rhino and Impact Players (Justin Credible and Lance Storm) (with Jason Knight and Dawn Marie) defeated Raven, Tommy Dreamer and The Sandman (with Francine)	Six-man tag team match	09:19
(c) / – the champion(s) heading into the match; D / – this was a dark match

=== Three-Way Dance eliminations ===
Elimination no.	Wrestler	Eliminated by	Elimination move	Time
1	Super Crazy	Yoshihiro Tajiri	Cradle Piledriver by Lynn and a Brainbuster	06:44
2	Yoshihiro Tajiri	Jerry Lynn	Cradle Piledriver	10:59
Winner:	Jerry Lynn			

== See also ==
- 1999 in professional wrestling
