= Hardcore Heaven =

- Promotions: Eastern Championship Wrestling/ Extreme Championship Wrestling
- First event: Hardcore Heaven (1994)
- Last event: Hardcore Heaven (2000)

Hardcore Heaven was a professional wrestling event produced by Eastern/Extreme Championship Wrestling (ECW). It took place annually from 1994 to 2000, with the exception of 1998. The 1997, 1999 and 2000 iterations aired on pay-per-view. The footage from the six Hardcore Heaven events is owned by WWE.

== Dates, venues and main events ==
Event	Date	City	Venue	Main event
Hardcore Heaven (1994)	August 13, 1994	Philadelphia, Pennsylvania	ECW Arena	Cactus Jack vs. Terry Funk
Hardcore Heaven (1995)	July 1, 1995	Philadelphia, Pennsylvania	ECW Arena	The Public Enemy (Rocco Rock and Johnny Grunge) vs. The Gangstas (New Jack and Mustafa Saed)
Hardcore Heaven (1996)	June 22, 1996	Philadelphia, Pennsylvania	ECW Arena	Sabu vs. Rob Van Dam
Hardcore Heaven (1997)	August 17, 1997	Fort Lauderdale, Florida	War Memorial Auditorium	Sabu (c) vs. Shane Douglas vs. Terry Funk in a Three-Way Dance for the ECW World Heavyweight Championship
Hardcore Heaven (1999)	May 16, 1999	Poughkeepsie, New York	Mid-Hudson Civic Center	Taz (c) vs. Buh Buh Ray Dudley in a Falls Count Anywhere match for the ECW World Heavyweight Championship
Hardcore Heaven (2000)	May 14, 2000	Milwaukee, Wisconsin	The Rave	Justin Credible (c) vs. Lance Storm for the ECW World Heavyweight Championship
(c) – refers to the champion(s) heading into the match
