= Impact Players =

Professional wrestling stable

The Impact Players

Tag team
- Members: Justin Credible; Lance Storm; Dawn Marie; Jason Knight
- Billed heights: 6 ft 0 in (1.83 m) - Credible; 6 ft 1 in (1.85 m) - Storm
- Combined billed weight: 453 lb (205 kg; 32.4 st)
- Debut: February 1999
- Disbanded: 2000

The Impact Players were a professional wrestling stable in Extreme Championship Wrestling that was composed of Lance Storm and Justin Credible.

== History ==
The Impact Players formed when Lance Storm and Justin Credible started teaming in ECW in February 1999. They were brought together when Shane Douglas announced his retirement on February 20, 1999 and was prepared to announce who the new "Franchise" was to be. Both Storm and Credible came to the ring and both said they were to be the next Franchise. Douglas then said neither of them were qualified and that the next one was to be Tommy Dreamer. Storm brought along his valet, Dawn Marie, and Credible brought along his manager, Jason. Together, they formed one of the most dominant units in ECW history.

They first feuded with Jerry Lynn and Sabu in singles matches and by late 1999, they had begun a violent feud with Tommy Dreamer and The Sandman. The team brutalized many singles stars during this period as well.

They won the ECW World Tag Team Championship at Guilty As Charged when they defeated Dreamer and his unwilling partner, Raven. They dominated the tag team scene for the next four months before splitting when Storm left for WCW and Credible won the ECW World Heavyweight Championship.

At Guilty as Charged 2001, Credible was joined by Steve Corino in the New Impact Players. This version of the group did not last long, as ECW filed for bankruptcy and went out of business two months later.

=== After ECW ===
During the Invasion storyline, both Storm and Credible were a part of The Alliance, and teamed together frequently throughout the storyline, mainly on Sunday Night Heat, where they had a series of matches with the Hardy Boys, who represented the WWF in the storyline.

They reunited at One Night Stand on June 12, 2005, when Credible helped Storm defeat Chris Jericho at the PPV, and they both interfered later in the night at the beginning of the main event of the PPV featuring Tommy Dreamer & The Sandman against The Dudley Boyz. They reunited again later the same year on Hardcore Homecoming: November Reign when Storm helped Credible in his cage match against Jerry Lynn.

Storm and Credible were scheduled as part of British promotion 1PW's Tag Title Tournament, to reform the Impact Players, but Credible missed his flight in order to be a part of WWE's ECW brand.

== Championships and accomplishments ==
- Extreme Championship Wrestling
  - ECW World Heavyweight Championship (1 time) – Justin Credible
  - ECW World Tag Team Champions (2 times)
