= Dawn Marie =

American model, wrestler and valet

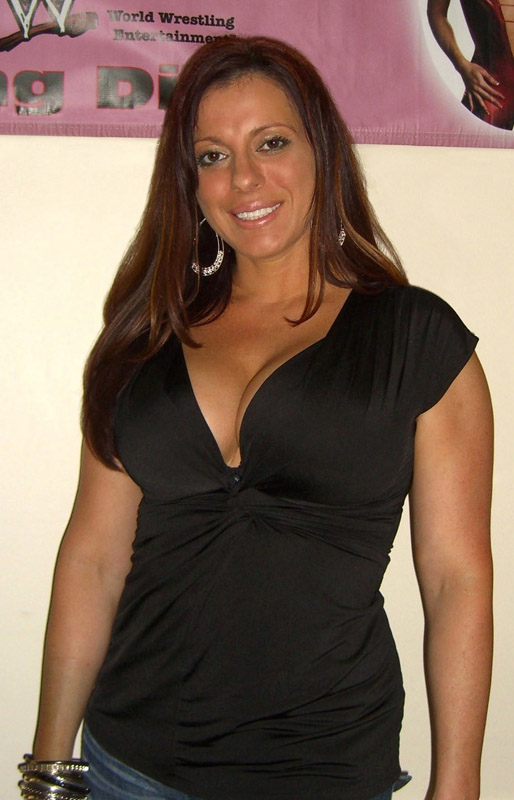
- Dawn Marie in 2011

Personal information
- Born: Dawn Marie Psaltis; November 3, 1970 (age 55) Rahway, New Jersey, U.S.
- Education: New York University Stern School of Business
- Spouse: Matthew DaMatta (m. 2005)
- Children: 2

Professional wrestling career
- Ring name(s): Dawn Marie; Dawn Marie Bytch; Dangerous Dawn; Dawn Marie Rinaldi; Tammy Lynn Bytch; Dawn Marie-Wilson; Dawn Marie Wilson
- Billed height: 5 ft 8 in (173 cm)
- Billed from: Woodbridge, New Jersey
- Trained by: Simon Diamond; Mikey Whipwreck; Buddy Landel; Devon Storm
- Debut: 1995
- Retired: 2012

Dawn Marie Psaltis (born November 3, 1970) is an American retired professional wrestler, professional wrestling valet, and actress. She is perhaps best known for her appearances with Extreme Championship Wrestling (ECW) and the SmackDown! brand of World Wrestling Entertainment (WWE) under her wrestling ring name Dawn Marie.

Before she entered the wrestling industry, Psaltis made her living in real estate. After deciding to pursue a career in modeling or acting, Psaltis began managing wrestlers on the independent circuit after meeting a wrestling promoter. She signed a deal with ECW after what was supposed to be a three-week stint. She managed The Impact Players and Simon and Swinger until ECW's bankruptcy in 2001.

Psaltis then joined WWE, where her most notable feud involved her marrying Al Wilson, the real-life father of her rival Torrie Wilson. She was released from her WWE contract in 2005 after revealing that she was pregnant, which resulted in her filing a lawsuit against her employers. Psaltis works as a nurse.

== Early life ==
Dawn Marie Psaltis was born on November 3, 1970, in Rahway, New Jersey, and raised by her father, a zoologist, and together, they spent their time camping and hunting. She is of Greek and Italian descent. In her youth, she was a fan of the World Wrestling Federation (WWF), admiring wrestlers such as Bob Backlund, Jimmy Snuka, and Roddy Piper. Psaltis graduated from the New York University Stern School of Business at the age of 22. She then went on to work for a real estate consultancy firm in Manhattan, New York, reaching the position of Director of International Real Estate.

After meeting an ex-boyfriend who had aspired to play football professionally and finding out that he had been signed by the Chicago Bears, Psaltis decided that she wanted to pursue a career in entertainment. She resigned from the firm and moved into the entertainment industry with the goal of becoming either a model or a professional actress.

== Professional wrestling career ==
=== Early career (1995–1998) ===
While signing modeling posters for Jonathan Gold, a talent agent and professional wrestling promoter, Psaltis jokingly told Gold that she would be interested in pursuing a career in wrestling. Gold took her comment at face value and later contacted Psaltis, informing her that she was scheduled to appear at a wrestling show in New Jersey. With some trepidation, she went to the show and managed Tony Atlas in his match against Jimmy Snuka. Psaltis made her professional wrestling debut in January 1995. She met her future fiancé Simon Diamond during her time in the independent wrestling promotions. She also met Buddy Landell and Devon Storm, both of whom helped train her. Psaltis spent four years working on the northeastern independent circuit, appearing with promotions such as Maryland Championship Wrestling and the Mid-Eastern Wrestling Federation.

=== Extreme Championship Wrestling (1998–2001) ===
In 1998, Psaltis was informed that Extreme Championship Wrestling (ECW) employee Buh Buh Ray Dudley was interested in bringing her into ECW. At the behest of Dudley, Psaltis traveled to the ECW Arena in Philadelphia, Pennsylvania, where ECW promoter Paul Heyman told her that he would book her for several appearances in an angle with Lance Storm. She debuted in ECW on August 28, 1998, as the manager of Storm, feuding with Chris Candido and his manager, Tammy Lynn Sytch. Although she was only supposed to have a three-week role in the company, Heyman was impressed by the chemistry between Psaltis and Storm and offered her a contract, which she accepted. Psaltis created her character to be in love with Storm and clumsy rather than glamorous.

Storm and Psaltis feuded with Candido and Sytch for several months, during which time Psaltis was renamed Tammy Lynn Bytch to spite Candido and his manager. After the respective feuds ended, she used the ring name Dawn Marie Bytch, which was eventually shortened to simply Dawn Marie. After Storm formed a tag team with Justin Credible known as the Impact Players in the summer of 1999, she managed both men, helping them win the ECW Tag Team Championship on two occasions. Psaltis continued to manage Storm until he left ECW for World Championship Wrestling (WCW) in May 2000. Psaltis was also offered a contract by WCW, but declined to leave ECW in order to remain with her fiancé, ECW wrestler Simon Diamond. She also had two years left on her ECW contract.

Storm then departed ECW, and Psaltis became a color commentator on ECW pay-per-views and the television series ECW on TNN. On December 3, 2000, at the Massacre on 34th Street pay-per-view, as part of a new angle, she announced that she would become the manager of the winner of the opening match pitting Simon Diamond and Swinger against Christian York and Joey Matthews. Although York and Matthews won the bout, Psaltis opted to join forces with Diamond and Swinger, whom she managed until ECW declared bankruptcy in April 2001.

=== Independent circuit (2001–2002) ===
Following the bankruptcy of ECW, Psaltis returned to the independent circuit, managing Diamond. The duo made several appearances alongside Swinger with the short lived X Wrestling Federation in November 2001. During her time on the independent circuit, she trained as a wrestler under Simon Diamond and Mikey Whipwreck. Also in 2001, Psaltis worked as a stock trader, and in 2002, she co-hosted a syndicated wrestling radio show known as the "Piledriver Rock and Wrestling Radio Show".

=== World Wrestling Federation/Entertainment (2002–2005) ===
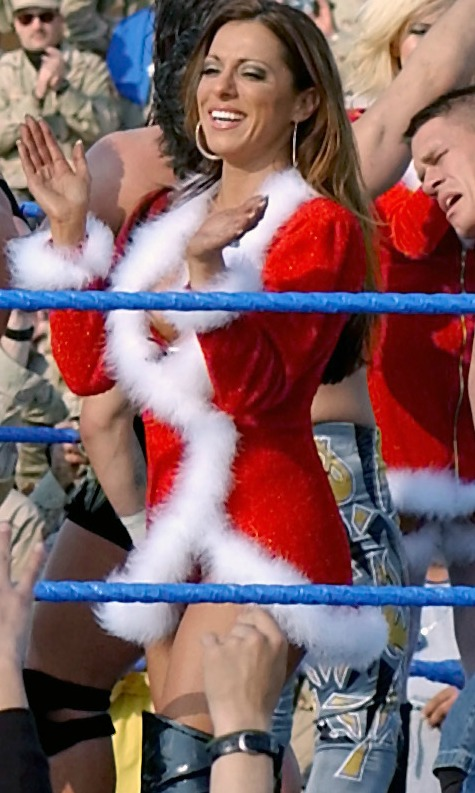
Marie at Tribute to the Troops in December 2003.

In April 2002, Psaltis began negotiating with the World Wrestling Federation (WWF), eventually agreeing to a deal. She made her World Wrestling Entertainment (WWE) television debut on the May 30 episode of SmackDown! as Vince McMahon's legal assistant. She debuted with the name "Dawn Marie Rinaldi" although it was quickly shortened to the original "Dawn Marie". In her initial storyline, she briefly feuded with Stacy Keibler over McMahon's affections until McMahon turned over the General Manager position to his daughter, Stephanie McMahon, which was followed shortly by Keibler's departure for the Raw brand.

Psaltis would begin a controversial feud with Torrie Wilson in 2002 until early 2003. On the October 17 episode of SmackDown!, Marie picked up her first victory when she teamed up with Matt Hardy to defeat Rikishi and Torrie Wilson. In response, Wilson defeated Psaltis at No Mercy in October. In the course of the angle, Psaltis developed a relationship with Wilson's real-life father Al Wilson. On the edition of November 7 of SmackDown!, Psaltis became engaged to Al. In December, Psaltis would attempt to bribe Wilson by inviting her to a hotel one night; if she arrived, she would break off the engagement. Footage of the event would later be shown at the Armageddon pay-per-view. Despite this, as part of the angle, the couple remained engaged, and the two got married on the January 2, 2003, episode of SmackDown!. Al then, in storyline, died from a heart attack after having rigorous sex numerous times in succession on their honeymoon. Wilson defeated Psaltis to seemingly end their feud at the Royal Rumble in 2003 in what was billed as a Stepmother vs. Stepdaughter match. On the March 13 episode of SmackDown!, Dawn Marie flashed the crowd, unbuttoning her outfit and opening it completely. In May 2004, Psaltis renewed her feud with Wilson. As part of the feud, the two had a match with Wilson's career on the line when the SmackDown! General Manager at the time, Kurt Angle, made the stipulation for the match at Judgment Day, which Wilson won.

After being on hiatus from SmackDown! programming, Psaltis returned in September 2004 and began a new storyline with Miss Jackie, involving whether she and Jackie's fiancée, Charlie Haas, had an affair. This angle led up to a match between the two at Armageddon, with Haas as the guest referee. Psaltis won the match, but afterward, Haas confirmed their affair and broke off both relationships.

At the No Way Out pay-per-view, on February 20, 2005, Dawn Marie entered a feud with Michelle McCool after McCool attacked Marie during the Divas Contest where Marie and Torrie Wilson co-hosted the contest. On the March 3 episode of Smackdown!, Marie teamed up with Rene Dupree in losing effort to Big Show and McCool in a mixed tag team match. On the March 24 episode of Smackdown!, Dawn Marie pinned McCool by using the ropes for leverage. On the April 14 episode of Smackdown!, Dawn Marie was defeated by Torrie in a Divas Match, this would turn out to be Marie's last match. Her last in-ring appearance with the company was at ECW One Night Stand, managing Lance Storm for his match against Chris Jericho. Her final appearance on WWE programming was during the June 19, 2005, episode of WWE Byte This!. On July 6, 2005, she was released from her WWE contract while on maternity leave.

=== Independent circuit (2005–2012) ===
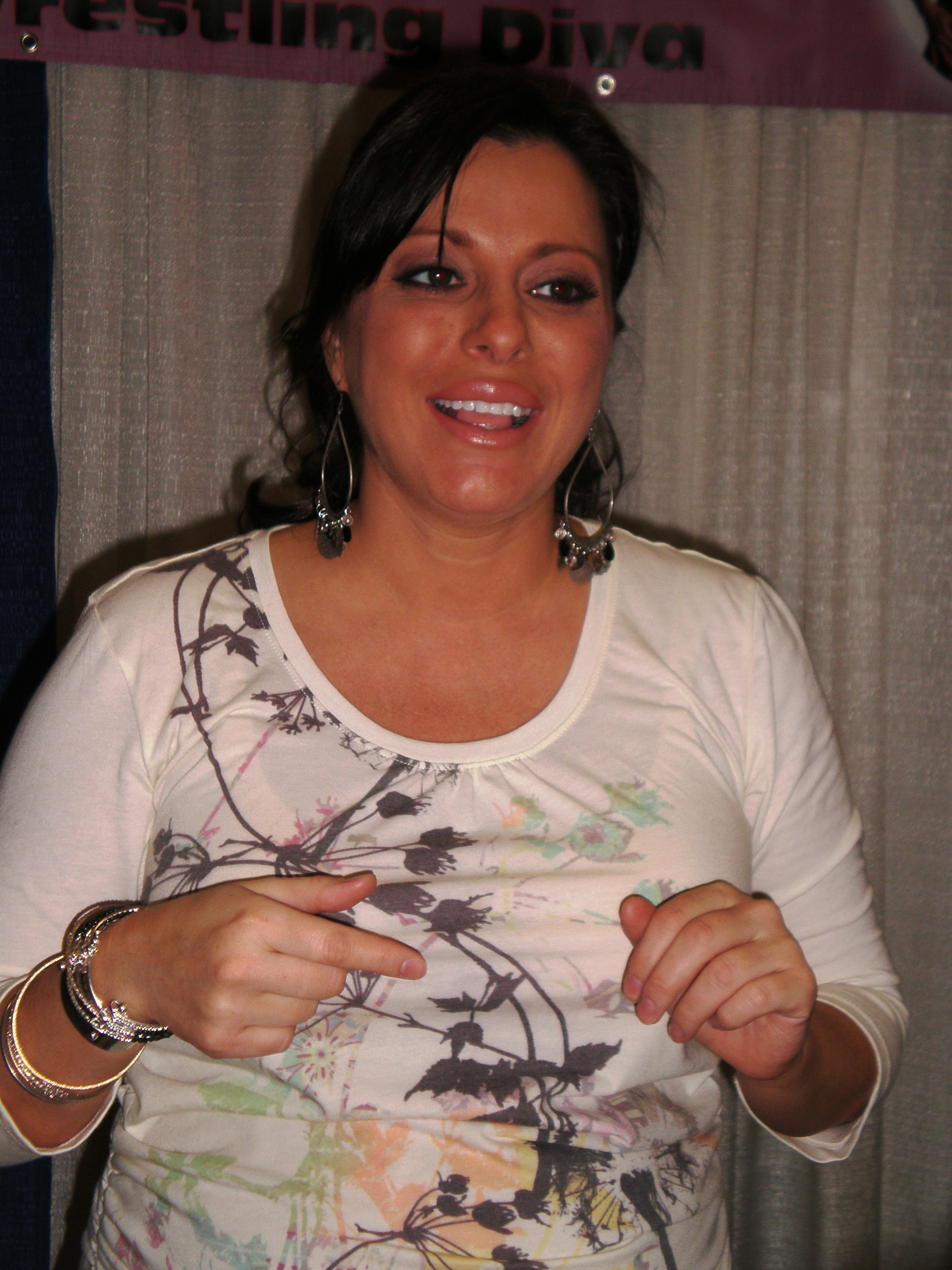
Psaltis in 2009.

After leaving WWE, on November 5, 2005, a visibly pregnant Psaltis appeared at the ECW reunion event Hardcore Homecoming: November Reign, which was unaffiliated with World Wrestling Entertainment, holding the key for the main event steel cage match between Jerry Lynn and Justin Credible. The match was won by Justin Credible after Psaltis, Jason Knight, and Lance Storm interfered on his behalf. In June 2006, she managed Johnny Candido in a match for the National Wrestling Superstars promotion.

On March 8, 2008, Marie made her debut for Women Superstars Uncensored as a special guest referee for match between Alexa Thatcher and Cindy Rogers versus Nikki Roxx and Alere Little Feather. Marie made her in-ring debut on the March 22, 2008, episode of Women Superstars Uncensored, competing in the WSU/NWS J-Cup Tournament and being managed by the villainous Tammy Lynn Sytch, but losing to Becky Bayless in the first round. On the June 21 episode of Women Superstars Uncensored, Marie was defeated by Becky Bayless following the match it was then turned in a tag team match where she teamed up with Portia Perez in a winning effort defeating Bayless and Angelina Love. On the August 23, 2008, episode of Women Superstars Uncensored, Marie's final match was where she competed in a no-contest with Trixie Lynn, Marie was scheduled to face Becky Bayless but was changed due to Bayless being signed to Total Nonstop Action Wrestling.

In July 2009, Psaltis signed with Dragon Gate USA as the "Live Event Hostess", a role similar to that of the ring announcer. Marie made appearance for UWE at their pay-per-view Meltdown', on July 21, 2012, managing Kevin Murphy and Richie Nightmare against "The Thrill Seeker" Sage Strong and The Mercenary whom was managed by Tommy Dreamer.

On the March 6, 2010, episode of Women Superstars Uncensored, Marie was inducted into the "Women Superstars Uncensored" Hall of Fame by Alicia.

Marie took part in the World Wrestling Fan Xperience showcase in 2012.

=== Return to WWE (2024) ===
At NXT Halloween Havoc on October 27, 2024, NXT general manager Ava announced that Marie would make her return to WWE as a special guest referee for a hardcore match between Jaida Parker and Lola Vice at NXT 2300 following which she made an appearance on the November 6 episode of NXT. This was her first appearance in WWE since her departure in 2005 and her first appearance on the NXT brand.

== Other media ==
Psaltis starred in The Vampire Carmilla, a 1999 independent film. In 2008, she appeared in the second installment of Paul Heyman's The Heyman Hustle video blog, which featured her and Heyman on the streets of New York City during the winter season, with Psaltis wearing only a bikini under a fur coat. Psaltis appears as a playable character in the games ECW Hardcore Revolution, ECW Anarchy Rulz and WWE WrestleMania XIX.

== Personal life ==
While wrestling in ECW, Psaltis took one college class a semester because of her love of learning and reading. She also took acting classes with the intention of becoming an actress after her career in professional wrestling was over. After her wrestling career, Psaltis became a nurse.

Psaltis began dating Simon Diamond in October 1998. Before dating, the two had been good friends for almost two years. They had planned to be married by the end of 2000 or into 2001. They did not wed, but stayed engaged for several years afterwards. After seven years together, their relationship had come to an end.

Later, Psaltis met Matthew DaMatta, whom she married in 2005 in Las Vegas. In 2005, Psaltis gave birth to her first child. In January 2006, she filed a complaint against WWE with the Equal Employment Opportunity Commission, claiming that her contract had been wrongfully terminated as a result of her pregnancy and that she had suffered mental duress as a result of the release. The case was reportedly settled in late 2007. Psaltis gave birth to her second child in 2009.

== Championships and accomplishments ==
- Women Superstars Uncensored
  - WSU Hall of Fame (2010)
- WrestleCrap
  - Gooker Award (2003) – "Al Wilson" feud with Torrie Wilson
- Women's Wrestling Hall of Fame
  - Class of 2025
