= D. C. Drake =

American professional wrestler and promoter (born 1957)

Personal information
- Born: Don Clyde Drake; September 16, 1957 (age 68) Phillipsburg, New Jersey, U.S.
- Spouse: Lydia

Professional wrestling career
- Ring name: D. C. Drake
- Billed height: 6 ft 1 in (185 cm)
- Billed weight: 256 lb (116 kg)
- Trained by: Tito Torres
- Debut: 1980
- Retired: 1995

Don Clyde Drake (born September 16, 1957) is an American addictions counselor, retired professional wrestler and former promoter. He is best known for his appearances on the northeastern independent circuit under the ring name D. C. Drake.

== Early life and education ==
The eldest of four children, Drake was born in Phillipsburg, New Jersey. He attended Phillipsburg High School. While growing up, he competed in wrestling and American Legion Baseball. After his father suffered a severe back injury, Drake began working in a filling station to supplement his family's income.

After graduating from Phillipsburg High School in 1974, Drake attended college, initially majored in criminal justice before moving to psychology and mental health.

== Career ==
In 1977, Drake began working for the New Jersey Department of Corrections as a corrections officer at the Mountainview Correctional Facility in Annandale, New Jersey. He left the Department of Corrections in 1987 to focus on his wrestling career.

=== Professional wrestling career ===
Drake was a fan of professional wrestling while growing up, running a backyard wrestling promotion during his teenage years. While working as a corrections officer, he trained as a professional wrestler under Tito Torres. He made his debut in 1980, facing The Hangman in Jersey City, New Jersey. He went on to wrestle on the independent circuit in New Jersey and New York.

==== Continental Wrestling Alliance/National Wrestling Federation (1982–1988) ====
In 1982, Drake founded the Allentown, Pennsylvania-based Continental Wrestling Alliance (CWA). The CWA had a roster of approximately 50 wrestlers and aired shows on cable television. In addition to running the promotion, Drake was the promotion's main babyface. He was managed by Uncle Bob, a local radio personality.

In 1986, Drake sold the CWA to Robert Raskin, who renamed the promotion the National Wrestling Federation. Drake became the promotion's booker and television producer and continued to wrestle, adopting a hardcore wrestling style. He developed the character of D. C. "Mad Dog" Drake, a frenzied wrestler. As part of the character, Drake foamed from the mouth (using Alka-Seltzer to create the effect), darkened his eyes with mascara, and was led to the ring on a chain by his manager Johnny Angel.

On June 7, 1986, Drake won a tournament for the newly created NWF Heavyweight Championship, defeating Rocky Jones in the final. His first reign ended on March 27, 1987 when he lost to Sgt. Slaughter. Drake held the title on two further occasions, feuding with wrestlers such as Jules Strongbow, Larry Winters and Bruiser Brody.

In 1988, Drake left the NWF after sustaining a series of injuries and becoming frustrated with the promotion's management.

==== ProStar Championship Wrestling (1988–1989) ====
In 1988, Drake founded another professional wrestling promotion, ProStar Championship Wrestling. The promotion, which staged shows at county fairs, featured multiple NWF wrestlers including Drake, Jules Strongbow, Sgt. Slaughter and Larry Winters. The promotion closed in 1989.

==== Tri-State Wrestling Alliance/Eastern Championship Wrestling (1990–1992) ====
In 1990, Drake was contacted by Joel Goodhart to wrestle for his newly formed promotion, the Philadelphia, Pennsylvania-based Tri-State Wrestling Alliance (TWA). The feud between Drake and Larry Winters was reignited in TWA, with the two facing one another in a series of stipulation matches including dog collar matches and stretcher matches. In one bout in the McGonigle Hall, Drake was thrown from the second floor balcony to the floor below.

On September 15, 1990, Drake won the vacant TWA Heavyweight Championship in a bout with Rockin' Rebel at the "Autumn Armageddon" supercard, breaking his ankle during the match. He lost the title to J.T. Smith on August 3, 1991.

In 1992, Goodhart sold his stake in TWA to Tod Gordon, who renamed the promotion Eastern Championship Wrestling (ECW). Drake wrestled on the first two ECW cards before retiring due to injuries.

==== Extreme Championship Wrestling (1995) ====
Drake made a one-off return to Eastern Championship Wrestling, later renamed Extreme Championship Wrestling, on February 25, 1995 at the Return of the Funker supercard. Drake was introduced as a mystery opponent for Cactus Jack by Woman as a continuation of Cactus Jack's feud with Woman and The Sandman. After Cactus Jack defeated Drake, The Sandman, Drake and Terry Funk attacked Cactus Jack until being driven off by Tommy Dreamer and Shane Douglas. After the match, ECW promoter Paul Heyman invited Drake to return for a series of matches with Dreamer but he declined and returned to retirement.

==== Retirement (1995–present) ====
In 1996, Drake began training for a return to professional wrestling. After an intensive session at the gym, Drake suffered a heart attack and was diagnosed with diffuse coronary artery disease, causing him to abort his comeback plans.

Drake made a one-night return to the ring with Top Rope Promotions on May 26, 2005, teaming with Spike Dudley in a loss to Chris Venom and Mike Bennett. He made a second return to the ring on August 27, 2005 at WrestleReunion, teaming with Amy Love and Gary Royal in a loss to George South, Jr, The Patriot and Wendi Richter.

=== Addictions counseling career ===
Drake studied for a master's degree in psychological counseling and was certified as an addictions counselor. He went on to run the Living and Recovering Community (LARC) program, a not-for-profit substance abuse treatment program for individuals with HIV at Lemuel Shattuck Hospital in Boston, Massachusetts.

== Personal life ==
Drake's first wife, with whom he had several children, contracted HIV from a blood transfusion. The couple divorced after Drake's wife developed AIDS and progressive multifocal leukoencephalopathy, causing behavioral changes. She later died from AIDS. Drake and his children did not contract HIV. Drake later remarried to Lydia.

Drake suffers from cardiovascular disease as a result of genetic disorders and anabolic steroid use, taking both metandienone and testosterone during his career. He has suffered a number of heart attacks since the age of 38 and has undergone coronary artery bypass surgery and percutaneous coronary interventions.

In the 1980s, Drake launched an anti-drug program aimed at schoolchildren called "Beyond No".

In December 2012, Drake was incorrectly reported as having died.

== Championships and accomplishments ==
- East Coast Wrestling Federation
  - ECWF Heavyweight Championship (1 time)
- Hardcore Hall of Fame
  - Class of 2025
- National Wrestling Federation
  - NWF Heavyweight Championship (3 times, first)
- New England Pro Wrestling Hall of Fame
  - Class of 2023
- Pro Wrestling Illustrated
  - PWI ranked him #178 of the top 500 singles wrestlers in the PWI 500 in 1991
- Tri-State Wrestling Alliance
  - TWA Heavyweight Championship (1 time)
