= Bubba Ray Dudley =

American professional wrestler (born 1971)

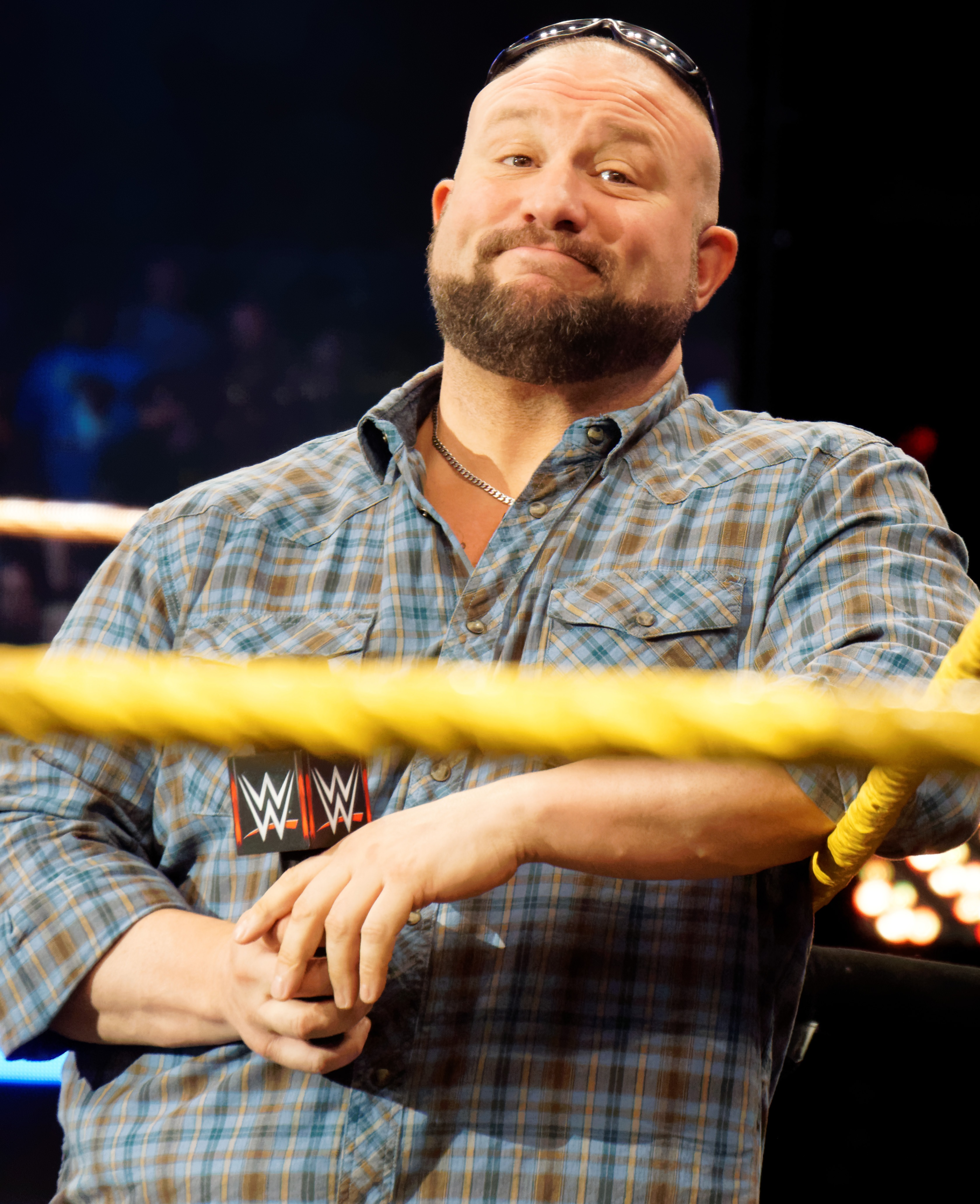
- Dudley in 2016

Personal information
- Born: Mark LoMonaco; July 14, 1971 (age 55) Queens, New York City, U.S.

Professional wrestling career
- Ring name(s): Brother Ray; Bubba Ray Dudley; Buh Buh Ray Dudley; Bully Ray; Mongo Vyle; The Terminator
- Billed height: 6 ft 3 in (191 cm)
- Billed weight: 280 lb (127 kg)
- Billed from: Dudleyville (as Bubba Ray Dudley/Buh Buh Ray Dudley); Hell's Kitchen, New York (as Mongo Vyle/Bully Ray); The Metropolitan area of Dudleyville (as Buh Buh Ray Dudley); New York, New York (as Brother Ray/Bully Ray)
- Trained by: Johnny Rodz
- Debut: 1991
- Retired: October 12, 2025

Mark LoMonaco (born July 14, 1971), known by his ring name Bubba Ray Dudley (also spelled Buh Buh Ray Dudley), is an American retired professional wrestler. He is signed to WWE as an ambassador. He is best known for being one-half of the Dudley Boyz tag team (also known as Team 3D) with D-Von Dudley, during his tenures in Extreme Championship Wrestling (ECW) and WWE.

Debuting in 1991, LoMonaco came to prominence when he joined ECW as a member of the Dudley Brothers in 1995, going by the ring name Bubba Ray Dudley. He formed a tag team with Devon Hughes (known as D-Von Dudley) called the Dudley Boyz, who became eight-time ECW World Tag Team Champions. In 1999, they moved to the WWF (now WWE) and became eight-time World Tag Team Champions, as well as one-time WWE Tag Team Champions and WCW World Tag Team Champions. An accomplished tag team wrestler, LoMonaco is considered one-half of one of the major teams that revived tag team wrestling during the Attitude Era. He also held the WWE Hardcore Championship eight times before leaving in 2005. Alongside Hughes, LoMonaco joined Total Nonstop Action Wrestling (TNA) later that year, changed their team name to Team 3D, in addition to changing his ring name to Brother Ray, and became one-time NWA World Tag Team Champions and two-time TNA World Tag Team Champions. After the team disbanded in 2010, LoMonaco competed as a singles wrestler under the name Bully Ray and went on to hold the TNA World Heavyweight Championship twice. He left TNA in 2015, and returned to WWE with Hughes as The Dudley Boyz for two years, before joining Ring of Honor (ROH), until 2020. He appears as a coach for WWE LFG.

LoMonaco has headlined several pay-per-view events, including the 2013 edition of TNA's flagship annual event, Bound for Glory. All totaled The Dudleyz/Team 3D won 23 tag team championships won between ECW, WWE, TNA and New Japan Pro-Wrestling (NJPW). Individually LoMonaco has won 36 total titles between ECW, WWE, TNA, NJPW, and Ring of Honor (ROH) factoring in the aforementioned tag team championships, eight WWE Hardcore Championships, two TNA World Championships, and one ROH World Six-Man Tag Team Championship (held with the Briscoe Brothers). LoMonaco and Hughes were inducted as a tag team into the TNA Hall of Fame in 2014, the WWE Hall of Fame in 2018, and the Hardcore Hall of Fame in 2024.

== Early life ==
Mark LoMonaco was born in the Queens borough of New York City on July 14, 1971. He moved to Dix Hills, New York, in his youth and graduated from Half Hollow Hills East High School, where he was a member of the track and football team. He is of Italian descent.

== Professional wrestling career ==
=== Early career (1991–1995) ===
LoMonaco trained under Johnny Rodz, and debuted in 1991. He used the ring name Mongo Vyle with the gimmick of a biker billed from Hell's Kitchen who was inspired by The Nasty Boys, The Road Warriors, and Maxx Payne. From 1993 to 1994, he worked as The Terminator for International World Class Championship Wrestling based in New York City.

=== Extreme Championship Wrestling (1995–1999) ===
LoMonaco received a tryout with Extreme Championship Wrestling in September 1995, appearing as Mongo, the bodyguard of Bill Alfonso. After impressing ECW owner Paul Heyman by taking a chokeslam from wrestler 911, LoMonaco was hired. He was recast as Buh Buh Ray Dudley, the stuttering, dancing, overweight, hillbilly member of the sprawling Dudley family. The unusual spelling of "Bubba" was a result of his stutter. In saying his name, Buh-Buh would stutter, causing him to say "my name is Buh-buh-buh-buh" until Big Dick Dudley struck him in the chest, at which point he would shout "my name is Bubba Ray Dudley". The fans embraced the comical Dudley boys and during Buh Buh's matches would chant "Buh Buh Buh Buh". The spelling eventually stuck.

On April 13, 1996, at Massacre on Queens Boulevard, D-Von Dudley debuted in ECW and began feuding with the other members of the Dudley Family (his kayfabe half-brothers), claiming that their comedic antics were not the way true Dudleys should act. D-Von eliminated Dances With Dudley, Dudley Dudley, and Chubby Dudley before joining forces with Buh Buh Ray, Big Dick, Sign Guy Dudley, and Joel Gertner. Known collectively as the Dudley Boyz, Buh Buh Ray and D-Von dominated the ECW tag team division, winning the ECW World Tag Team Championship a record eight times and defeating the four major tag teams in ECW: The Public Enemy, The Eliminators, The Gangstas, and Sabu and Rob Van Dam. Buh Buh Ray, D-Von, and Gertner all achieved a degree of infamy for their vitriolic interviews, which antagonized audiences to a point of near riot.

=== World Wrestling Federation/Entertainment (1999–2005) ===
==== The Dudley Boyz (1999–2002) ====
In 1999, Buh Buh Ray and D-Von left ECW and joined the World Wrestling Federation, where the "Buh Buh" stutter-spelling of "Bubba Ray Dudley" was rescinded. Throughout 2000 and 2001, the Dudley Boyz engaged in a three-way feud for the WWF Tag Team Championship with The Hardy Boyz and Edge & Christian. The feud incorporated one Ladder Match and two critically acclaimed Tables, Ladders, and Chairs matches, the Ladder at WrestleMania 2000, and the TLC matches at SummerSlam (2000), and WrestleMania X-Seven. While they were initially heels, one of the things Bubba Ray was known for was driving women through tables including WWE Divas Terri, Mae Young, Lita, Trish Stratus, Tori, Torrie Wilson, Stacy Keibler and Jazz. The Dudley Boyz were soon cheered by the crowd and were turned face in early 2000. On the December 28, 2000 episode of SmackDown!, Bubba Ray received a title shot against WWF Champion Kurt Angle, which he lost. In early 2001, The Dudleys were joined in the WWF by Spike Dudley.

In mid-2001, the Dudley Boyz turned heel once again by joining The Alliance, a large stable of former ECW and World Championship Wrestling (WCW) wrestlers led by Shane McMahon and Stephanie McMahon-Helmsley who attempted to take over the WWF (Spike, along with other ECW alumni, did not join The Alliance). The ECW-WCW invasion ended at the Survivor Series, when five WWF wrestlers defeated five Alliance wrestlers in a match to determine the ownership of the WWF. The Alliance disbanded and its members left the WWF, but the Dudley Boyz retained their jobs due to their possession of the WWF Tag Team Championship, which they had unified with the WCW Tag Team Championship that night.

==== Hardcore Champion and Dudley Boyz reunion (2002–2005) ====
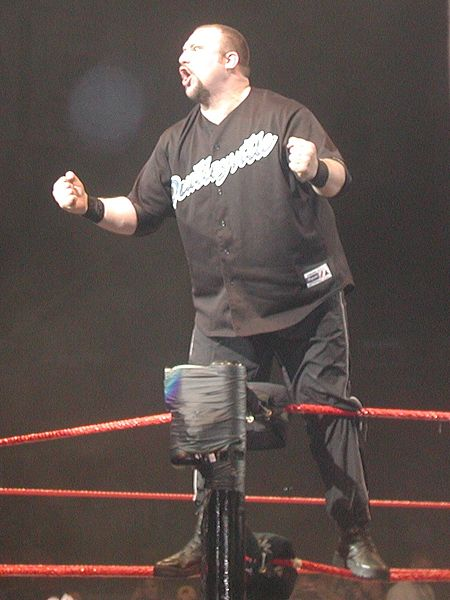
Dudley as a singles competitor on Raw in 2002

Following WrestleMania X8, the WWF was renamed "World Wrestling Entertainment" (WWE) in May 2002 and the roster was divided into two brands: Raw and SmackDown!. The Dudley Boyz were separated when Bubba Ray was drafted to the Raw brand and D-Von was drafted to the SmackDown! brand. On Raw, Bubba Ray found moderate success as he competed for the WWE Hardcore Championship, formed a tag team with Spike, and even competed in a World Heavyweight Championship match against Triple H. D-Von's new gimmick on SmackDown! failed to get over, however, and he was reunited with Bubba Ray and Spike at Survivor Series on November 17, when he moved to the Raw brand to help Bubba Ray and Spike defeat Rico and 3-Minute Warning (Rosey and Jamal) in a Six Man elimination tables match.

The Dudley Boyz became a force to be reckoned with in the Raw tag team division over the next sixteen months, feuding with teams such as 3-Minute Warning, La Résistance, and various combinations of The Un-Americans. They held the World Tag Team Championship several more times before being traded (along with Booker T) to the SmackDown! brand on March 22, 2004, in exchange for Triple H. Shortly after arriving on SmackDown!, the Dudley Boyz turned heel once again, siding with Paul Heyman and feuding with Rob Van Dam and Rey Mysterio. On the May 27 episode of SmackDown!, the Dudley Boyz kidnapped Paul Bearer, the manager of Heyman's enemy The Undertaker. On June 27 at The Great American Bash, The Undertaker defeated the Dudley Boyz in a handicap match. In July, the Dudley Boyz reunited with Spike. For the remainder of the year, they assisted Spike in his matches for the WWE Cruiserweight Championship. They also won the WWE Tag Team Championship one more time. In early 2005, the Dudley Boyz were removed from WWE television and sent to Ohio Valley Wrestling while the WWE creative team attempted to devise an angle for them.

The Dudley Boyz returned to WWE television in June 2005 in order to promote ECW One Night Stand, an ECW reunion show. In the weeks preceding ECW One Night Stand they, along with several other ECW alumni, vied with General Manager Eric Bischoff and his "anti-hardcore crusaders". At ECW One Night Stand on June 12, the Dudley Boyz defeated Tommy Dreamer and The Sandman in the main event of the night after driving Dreamer through a flaming table. On July 5, 2005, WWE announced that it had opted not to continue contract renewal negotiations with the Dudley Boyz. In addition, fifteen other wrestlers were released by WWE, which was decreasing its spending as a result of a fall in projected revenue. In August 2005, all three former Dudleys were issued with legal notices instructing them not to use the (WWE trademarked) name "Dudley". This led to a degree of acrimony between the former Dudleys and their erstwhile employers, as they had used the names since 1996, several years before all ECW intellectual property was acquired by WWE as a result of bankruptcy proceedings. Soon after, LoMonaco and Hughes (D-Von) announced that they intended to pursue legal action against WWE.

=== Total Nonstop Action Wrestling (2005–2014; 2015) ===
==== Team 3D (2005–2010) ====
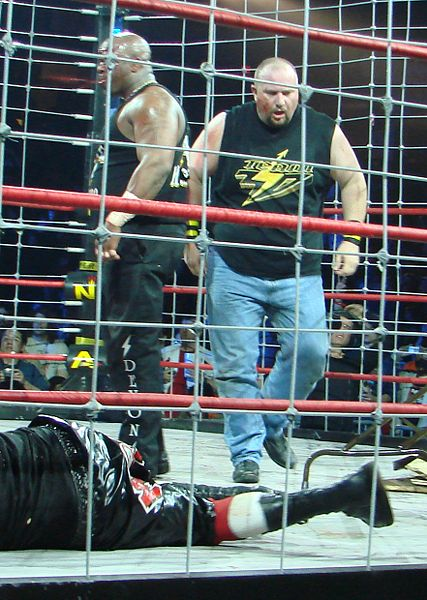
Team 3D in a steel cage

No longer able to use the Bubba Ray Dudley name, LoMonaco adopted (and trademarked) the ring name Brother Ray Deadly, while Hughes became Brother Devon Deadly. The team also trademarked the terms "Deadly Brothers" and "Deadly Death Drop". In August and September 2005, Ray and Devon made several appearances on the independent circuit, most notably Hardcore Homecoming, an unofficial ECW reunion show organized by ECW alumnus Shane Douglas, a frequent critic of WWE and Chairman Vince McMahon. On September 21, 2005, it was announced that they had signed multi-year contracts with Total Nonstop Action Wrestling (TNA).

Ray and Devon debuted in TNA on the October 1, 2005 episode of TNA Impact! – the first episode of Impact! to be aired on Spike TV and in a prime time slot. They were identified as "Brother Ray" and "Brother Devon" respectively (with the suffix "Deadly" apparently having been dropped) and as Team 3D collectively. Team 3D quickly established themselves as faces by confronting the heel NWA World Heavyweight Champion Jeff Jarrett and his allies, the NWA World Tag Team Champions, America's Most Wanted (AMW). Team 3D defeated AMW at pay-per-view events in November and December 2005, but failed to defeat them in a title match at Final Resolution on January 15, 2006, due to the interference of Team Canada. Ray and Devon continued to feud with America's Most Wanted and Team Canada over the following months. On the April 13 episode of Impact!, an attempted ambush by Team Canada was foiled by the debuting Spike Dudley, identified as "Brother Runt". They had many battles with The Latin American Xchange (LAX) until winning the NWA World Tag Team Championship from LAX at Lockdown in an "electrified" steel cage match.

Upon the disintegration of TNA's contract with the NWA, Ray and D-Von were stripped of the NWA Tag Team Championships and awarded the TNA World Tag Team Championship as compensation. They defended these belts against the team of Road Warrior Animal and Rick Steiner at Slammiversary. Following a match on Impact! to determine opponents, Ray would headline Victory Road alongside his partner in a match of champions encounter against TNA World Champion Kurt Angle and X Division Champion Samoa Joe. At Victory Road, Ray and D-Von lost their match, and the TNA tag titles, to Angle and Joe, though only Joe gained complete control of the titles as he scored the pinfall and could select a partner of his choosing.

The next feud had Team 3D along with the X-Division traitor Johnny Devine against Motor City Machine Guns (Alex Shelley and Chris Sabin) and the entire TNA X Division. Team 3D and Devine lost at Against All Odds 2008 meaning that they have to be under two-hundred seventy-five pounds in order to compete in the X Division. However, the angle was dropped. Brother Ray and Devon aligned themselves with Angle during his feud with A.J. Styles. This led to them feuding with Christian Cage and Rhino as well. At Hard Justice, they lost to Cage and Rhino in a New Jersey Street Fight. They then feuded with Matt Morgan and Abyss, losing to them at No Surrender. At Bound for Glory IV, they participated in a Monster's Ball match for the Tag Team Championship, but came up short. Team 3D appeared to join Main Event Mafia but turned face by double crossing the stable and jumping them along with TNA Front Line leaders Samoa Joe, A.J. Styles, and Rhino. They also attempted to put former ally Kurt Angle through a table.

At Lockdown Team 3D won the TNA World Tag Team Championship and retained the IWGP Tag Team Championship against Beer Money, Inc. (Robert Roode and James Storm). At Slammiversary they lost the TNA tag titles to Beer Money, Inc. and on the July 30 episode of Impact!, the IWGP tag titles to The British Invasion of Brutus Magnus and Doug Williams. On October 18, 2009, at Bound for Glory, Team 3D captured their 23rd tag team championship when they defeated Beer Money, British Invasion, and The Main Event Mafia's Scott Steiner and Booker T in a Full Metal Mayhem Tag Team match.

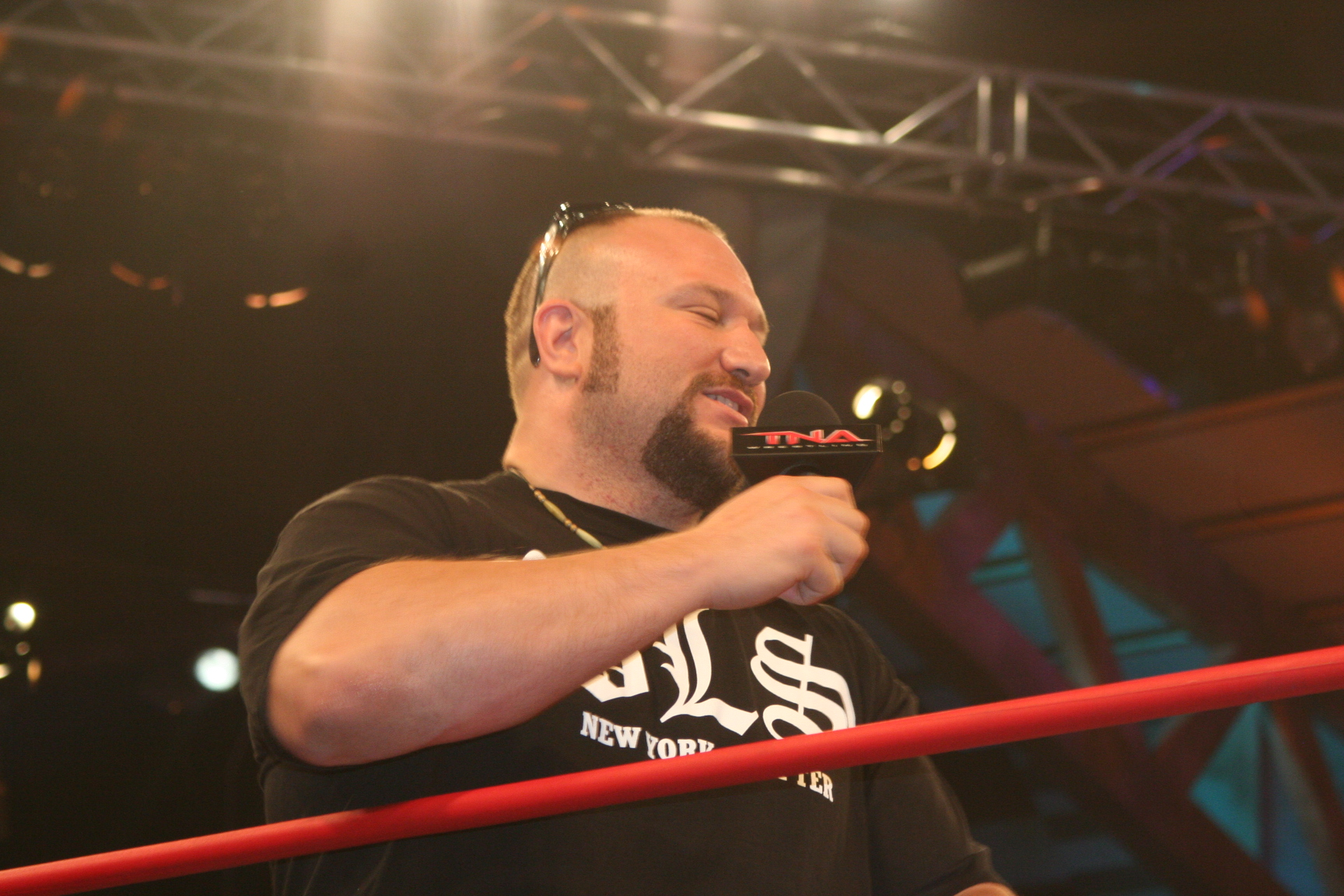
Brother Ray in 2010

With both the IWGP and TNA Tag tiles on the line, they captured the IWGP titles which were formerly held by The British Invasion. During the following weeks Team 3D turned heel and aligned themselves with Rhino in a battle against the younger talent of the company. On the November 19 episode of Impact!, Team 3D Academy of Professional Wrestling and Sports Entertainment graduate Jesse Neal joined Team 3D and Rhino, and two weeks later Suicide joined Morgan, Hernandez and Dinero to level the playing field. At Final Resolution Morgan, Hernandez, Dinero and Suicide defeated Neal, Team 3D and Rhino in an eight-man elimination tag team match. On January 4, 2010, at Wrestle Kingdom IV, Team 3D lost the IWGP Tag Team Title to No Limit (Tetsuya Naito and Yujiro) in a three-way hardcore match, which also included Bad Intentions (Giant Bernard and Karl Anderson). When Hulk Hogan and Eric Bischoff took over TNA at the beginning of 2010, Team 3D's angle with Rhino and Neal was discontinued and they reverted to being faces, while starting a feud with The Nasty Boys (Brian Knobbs and Jerry Sags), who were a part of the new wave of wrestlers brought in by Hogan and Bischoff. At Against All Odds, The Nasty Boys defeated Team 3D in a tag team match, when Jimmy Hart made his return to the company and interfered in the match on the Nasty Boys' behalf.

Team 3D avenged their loss on the February 25 episode of Impact!, when Neal helped them defeat the Nasty Boys in a tables match. On the March 15 episode of Impact!, Team 3D and Neal were scheduled to face the Nasty Boys and Hart in a six-man tag team match, but prior to the match the Nasty Boys attacked Neal backstage and put him through a table. Team 3D found Neal a replacement in the returning Brother Runt, but were still defeated in the match by the Nastys and Hart. However, after the match Neal made the save for Team 3D and helped them put Sags through a table. On May 16 at Sacrifice, Ray turned heel by attacking Neal and costing him and Shannon Moore their match for the TNA World Tag Team Championship, after feeling he had been disrespected by Neal. The following month at Slammiversary VIII, Neal defeated Ray in a singles match after a distraction from the debuting Tommy Dreamer. The following month at Victory Road, Ray faced Neal and Devon in a three-way match. During the match, the members of Team 3D attacked each other, before Neal accidentally speared Devon and was then pinned by Ray. On the following episode of Impact!, Devon joined fellow ECW alumni Mick Foley, Dreamer, Raven, Stevie Richards, Rhino, Pat Kenney and Al Snow and TNA World Heavyweight Champion Rob Van Dam in attacking Brother Ray, Abyss and the rest of the TNA locker room. The following week, Ray declined Devon's offer to join the ECW alumni, before TNA president Dixie Carter agreed to give them their own reunion pay-per-view event, Hardcore Justice: The Last Stand, as a celebration of hardcore wrestling and a final farewell to the company. However, on the July 29 episode of Impact!, Ray decided to join the ECW alumni and seemingly buried the hatchet with his brother, becoming a face again in the process. On August 8 at Hardcore Justice, Team 3D, accompanied by Joel Gertner, defeated Axl Rotten and Balls Mahoney, billed as Kahoneys, in a South Philadelphia Street Fight. After the match Ray and Devon were assaulted by the Gangstas. On the following episode of Impact!, the ECW alumni, known collectively as Extreme, Version 2.0 (EV 2.0), were assaulted by A.J. Styles, Kazarian, Robert Roode, James Storm, Douglas Williams and Matt Morgan of Ric Flair's Fourtune stable, who thought they did not deserve to be in TNA. This would mark Team 3D's final appearance on their old TNA contracts, which expired shortly thereafter. The two then entered negotiations over new contracts. Team 3D returned to TNA television two month later on the October 7 live episode of Impact!, promising a major announcement at Bound for Glory. At the pay-per-view Team 3D announced their retirement, but asked for a one final match against the TNA World Tag Team Champions, the Motor City Machine Guns. Their new multi-year contracts with TNA were confirmed shortly thereafter. At Turning Point, the Motor City Machine Guns defeated Team 3D to retain the TNA World Tag Team Championship.

==== Immortal (2010–2012) ====
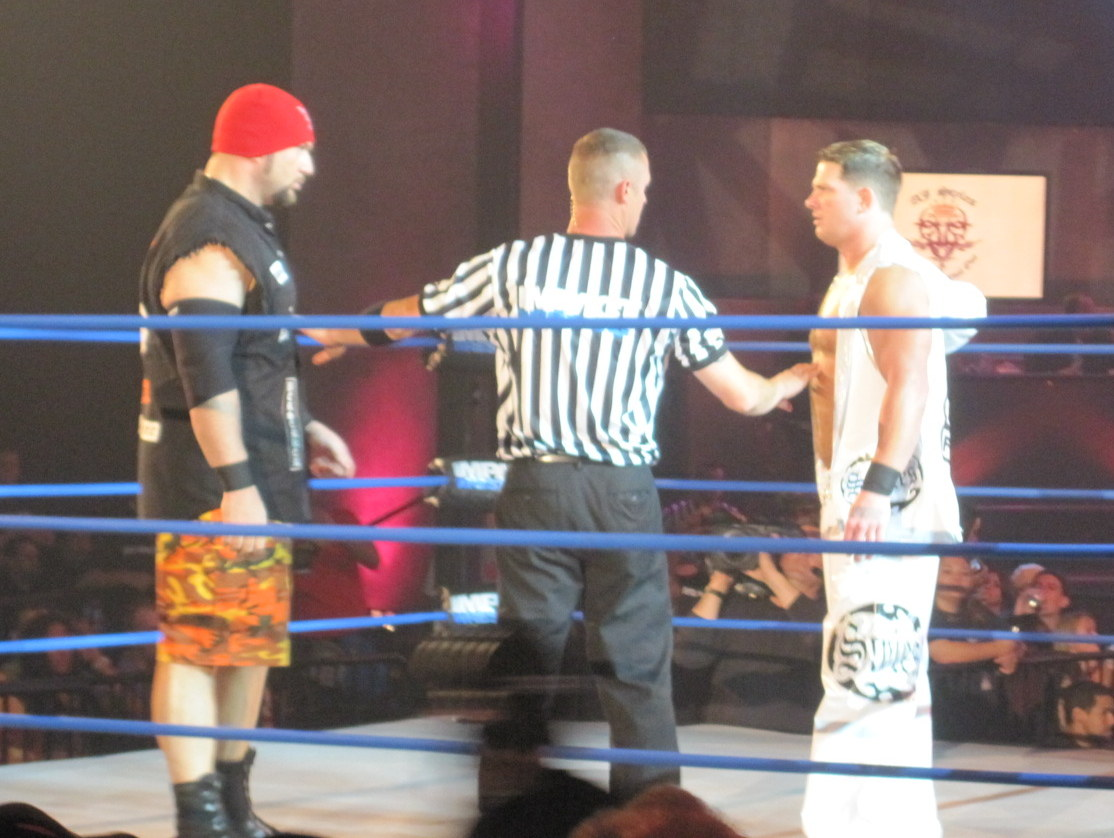
Ray facing A.J. Styles at Slammiversary IX

During Team 3D's retirement ceremony on the following episode of Impact!, Ray turned heel by attacking Devon, reigniting the feud between the two. The following week Ray claimed that Devon had gotten weak, since Chris Sabin had managed to kick out of a 3D (Dudley Death Drop) at Turning Point, calling him the Marty Jannetty and himself the Shawn Michaels of the team. On the December 16 episode of Impact!, LoMonaco renamed himself Bully Ray, as he defeated Amazing Red in a squash match. On January 9, 2011, at Genesis, Ray defeated Devon via disqualification, after Devon hit his former partner with his own chain. In the following weeks, Devon's sons Terrence and Terrell began making appearances on Impact!, and were regularly abused by Ray. At Against All Odds Ray faced his former tag team partner in a Street Fight. After Devon's sons interfered in the match, Ray low-blowed him and pinned one of his sons for the win. On March 13 at Victory Road, Devon and his sons interfered in a Falls Count Anywhere match between Ray and Tommy Dreamer, costing Ray the match. On the following episode of Impact!, Ray's feud with Devon was abruptly ended as he aligned himself with Immortal and moved on to feuding with Fortune. At the show's end, Ray powerbombed A.J. Styles off the entrance stage through a table, sidelining him with a storyline injury. On April 17 at Lockdown, Immortal, represented by Ray, Abyss, Matt Hardy and Ric Flair, was defeated by Fortune members James Storm, Kazarian and Robert Roode and Christopher Daniels, who replaced Styles, in a Lethal Lockdown match. During the match, Styles made his return, attacking Ray as he was beating Daniels. On the April 28 episode of Impact!, Ray challenged Sting for the TNA World Heavyweight Championship, but was defeated following interference from Styles. Ray then recruited Dreamer as his partner and helped him defeat Styles at Sacrifice. On the May 26 episode of Impact Wrestling, Styles and Daniels defeated Ray and Dreamer in a No Disqualification Street Fight. On June 12 at Slammiversary IX, Ray defeated Styles in a Last Man Standing match to win the feud. After the match Ray, though still retaining his status as a heel, put over Styles' resilience.

On the July 28 episode of Impact Wrestling, Ray began having problems with fellow Immortal member Mr. Anderson, when he cost him his steel cage match against Kurt Angle. The tension between the two stablemates eventually led to a match on August 7 at Hardcore Justice, where Ray defeated Anderson with a low blow. From June to September, Ray was one of the twelve participants in the Bound for Glory Series to determine the number one contender to the TNA World Heavyweight Championship. When the group stage of the tournament concluded, Ray finished in the top four and thus advanced to the finals at No Surrender along with James Storm, Robert Roode and his Immortal stablemate, Gunner. On September 11 at No Surrender, Ray defeated Storm via disqualification, moving him up to 52 points. However, later in the event Roode managed to defeat Gunner via submission, which meant that he tied Ray's score to set up a tiebreaker match between the two. In the tiebreaker match, Ray was defeated by Roode via pinfall. On October 16 at Bound for Glory, Ray was defeated by former Immortal stablemate Mr. Anderson in a Falls Count Anywhere match. On November 13 at Turning Point, Ray and Scott Steiner were defeated by Anderson and Abyss in a tag team match. On January 8, 2012, at Genesis, Ray was defeated by Abyss in a Monster's Ball match. Ray later aligned himself with Bobby Roode, interfering in his matches especially ones relating to Roode's title. On February 12 at Against All Odds, Ray was unable to capture the TNA World Heavyweight Championship from Roode in a four-way match, which also included James Storm and Jeff Hardy. On the February 16 episode of Impact Wrestling, Ray was defeated by James Storm in a number one contender's match. On March 18 at Victory Road, Ray was defeated by Storm in a rematch to retain his spot as the number one contender. On the following episode of Impact Wrestling, Ray started a rivalry with X Division Champion Austin Aries, after interrupting an X Division Championship match between Aries, Anthony Nese, Kid Kash and Zema Ion. The rivalry between Ray and Aries continued on April 15 at Lockdown, where the two were on opposing teams in the annual Lethal Lockdown match. On the April 12, 2012 episode of Impact, Ray with Eric Bischoff, Flair, Kazarian, Daniels and Gunner defeated Styles with Garett Bischoff, Aries and Mr. Anderson. Aries' team, led by Garett Bischoff, ended up defeating Ray's team, led by Eric Bischoff. On May 13 at Sacrifice, Ray was defeated by Aries in a singles match. Afterwards, Ray returned to his rivalry with Abyss, when his supposed brother Joseph Park accused him of Abyss' disappearance. On June 10 at Slammiversary, Park defeated Ray in an Anything Goes match, following interference from Abyss. On the following episode of Impact Wrestling, Ray entered the 2012 Bound for Glory Series, taking part in the opening gauntlet match, from which he was eliminated by an interfering Abyss. Ray and Park had a rematch on the July 12 episode of Impact Wrestling in an Anything Goes match, which Ray won after hitting his opponent with a chain. After the match, Park attacked Ray and hit him with Abyss' signature Black Hole Slam.

==== Aces & Eights (2012–2013) ====
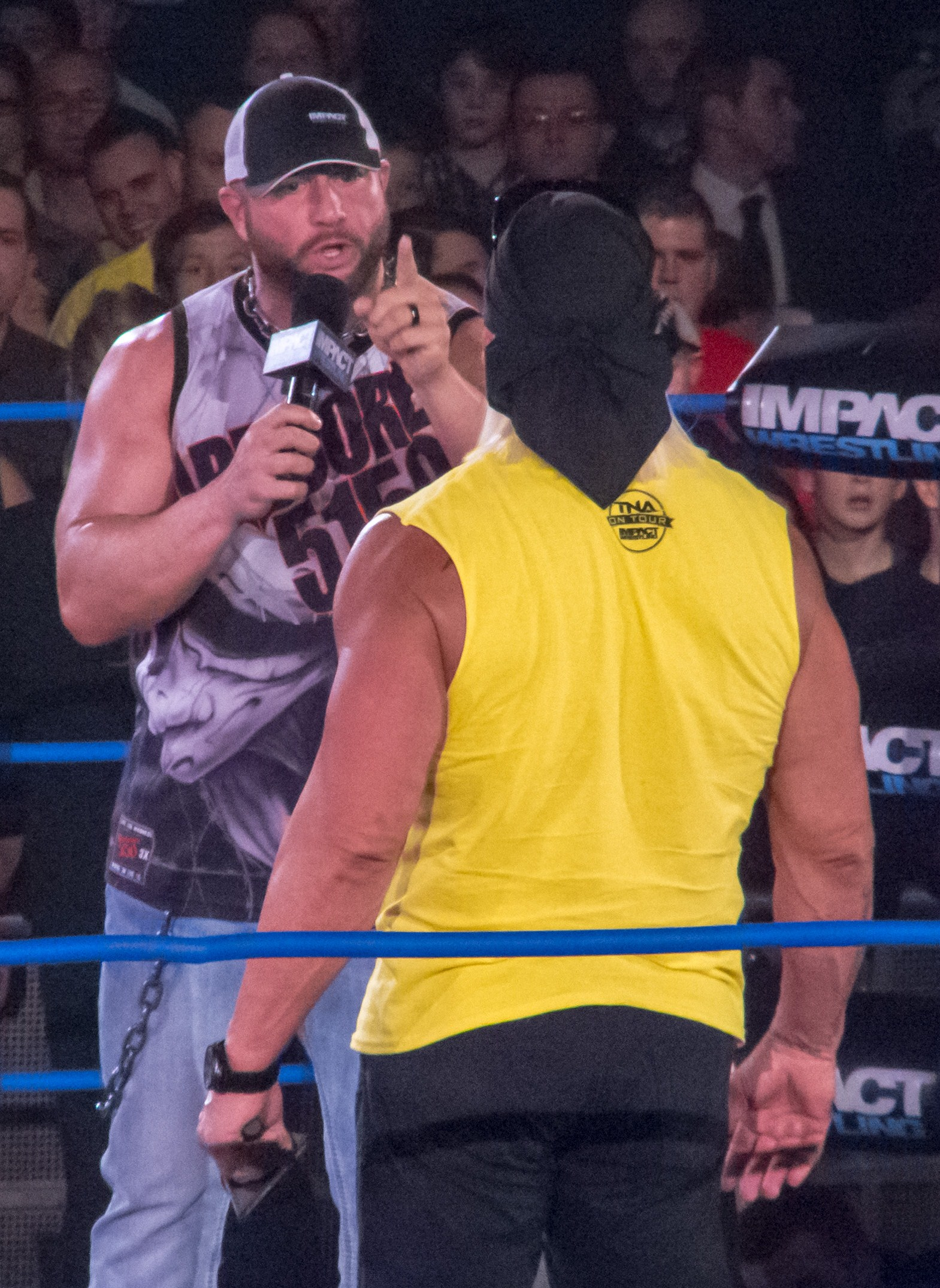
In March 2013, Bully Ray revealed himself as the President of Aces & Eights and began a feud with Hulk Hogan.

In August, Ray came together with the rest of the TNA locker room to battle the villainous Aces & Eights stable, who had been attacking random TNA wrestlers during the past months, in the process making a gradual face turn. In September, Ray, unlike his longtime tag team partner Devon, signed a two-year contract extension with TNA. On the September 6 episode of Impact Wrestling, Ray finished his Bound for Glory Series group stage with a win over Rob Van Dam, thus finishing third and advancing to the semifinals of the tournament. On September 9 at No Surrender, Ray defeated James Storm in his semifinal match, following interference from Bobby Roode, before losing to Jeff Hardy in the finals of the 2012 Bound for Glory Series, despite Hardy being attacked by the Aces & Eights before the match. On the following episode of Impact Wrestling, Ray was granted another opportunity to become the number one contender to the TNA World Heavyweight Championship, but was again defeated by Hardy. On the September 20 episode of Impact Wrestling, Ray defeated World Heavyweight Champion Austin Aries in a non-title match, after hitting him with a steel chain. On the October 4 episode of Impact Wrestling, Ray defeated both Aries and his number one contender Jeff Hardy in a three-way match, after which Hulk Hogan agreed to let him become Sting's partner for the match against the Aces & Eights stable at Bound for Glory. On October 14 at Bound for Glory, Ray and Sting were defeated by the Aces & Eights, who in the process earned full access to TNA. Afterwards, the returning Devon was revealed as one of the members of the Aces & Eights. On November 1, Ray and Devon faced off in the main event of Impact Wrestling, however, the match ended in a brawl between the Aces & Eights and the TNA locker room.

Over the next few weeks, tension would be teased between Ray and Hulk Hogan after Austin Aries revealed a secret relationship between Ray and the general manager's daughter Brooke. On December 9 at Final Resolution, Ray was defeated by Austin Aries in a singles match, following a distraction from both Brooke and Hulk Hogan and a low blow from Aries. On the January 3, 2013 episode of Impact Wrestling, Hogan suspended both Ray and Brooke after seeing them kissing in the parking garage two weeks before. The following week, Ray proposed to Brooke after saving her from the Aces & Eights, which she accepted. The ceremony took place the next week on Impact Wrestling, where Ray's groomsman Taz interrupted and revealed himself a member of Aces & Eights, leading to the group attacking Ray, Hulk Hogan, and the rest of the groomsmen. On the January 31 episode of Impact Wrestling, Hogan reinstated Ray and pitted him and Sting against Aces & Eights (Devon and DOC) in a Tables match the following week, where Ray won the match by putting Devon through a table.

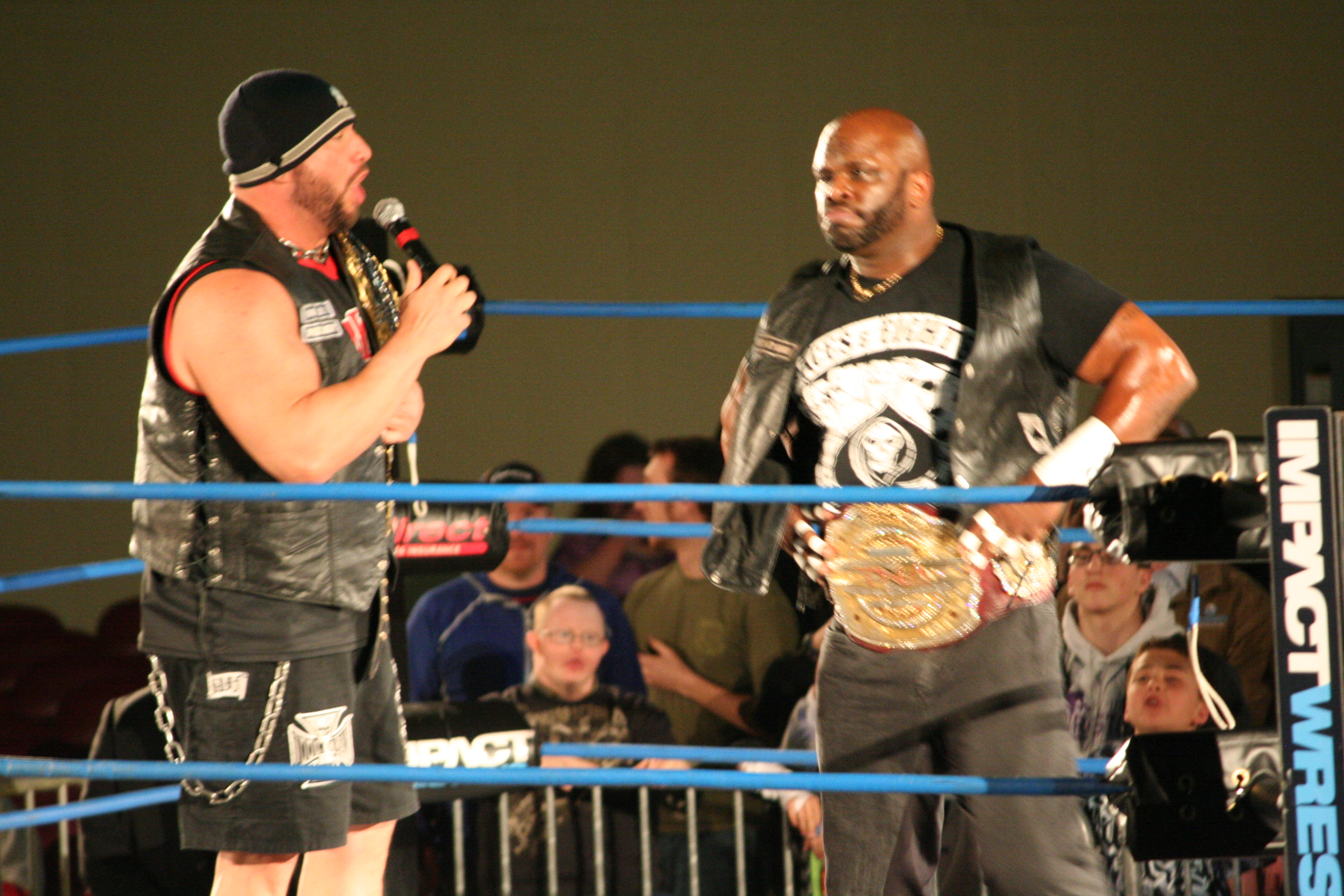
Bully Ray and Devon reunited again in the stable Aces & Eights.

On the February 21 episode of Impact Wrestling, Hogan named Ray the number one contender to the TNA World Heavyweight Championship. Ray received his shot in a steel cage match on March 10 at Lockdown, where he defeated Jeff Hardy, following interference from Aces & Eights, to win his first World Heavyweight Championship. Afterwards, Ray revealed himself as the president of Aces & Eights, turning heel again in the process, and reuniting with Devon. Ray made his first televised title defense on the April 11 episode of Impact Wrestling, defeating Jeff Hardy in a Full Metal Mayhem match to retain his title. On June 2 at Slammiversary XI, Ray successfully defended the World Heavyweight Championship against Sting in a No Holds Barred Match after an interference by Aces & Eights, with the added stipulation, that Sting would never get another World title opportunity again. Following Slammiversary, Ray and Aces & Eights would continue feuding with Sting and his New Main Event Mafia (Kurt Angle, Magnus, Samoa Joe, and Rampage Jackson). On July 18, during the Destination X episode of Impact Wrestling, Ray lost the TNA World Heavyweight Championship to Chris Sabin, ending his reign at 130 days. Ray received his rematch in a steel cage on August 15 at Impact Wrestling: Hardcore Justice, where he defeated Sabin, following interference from Mr. Anderson and Tito Ortiz, to regain the TNA World Heavyweight Championship. On the August 22 episode of Impact Wrestling, Ray revealed his marriage with Brooke Hogan fell apart as he broke up with her, and announced his relationship with Brooke Tessmacher. Later that night, Devon was forced to leave TNA after being pinned by A.J. Styles in a five-on-five tag team match against the Main Event Mafia. The following week, tension began to be teased between Bully Ray and Aces & Eights Vice-president Mr. Anderson, with Anderson disagreeing with Ray claiming he never needed Devon and bring Tito Ortiz into the stable without a group vote. During Ray's match with Sting on the September 5 episode of Impact Wrestling, Anderson cost Ray by refusing to help him. Afterwards, Anderson attacked Ray and announced that he would be his challenger at No Surrender. The following week, Ray successfully defended his title against Anderson in a Last Man Standing match. Afterwards, as Anderson was being stretchered away, Ray attacked him and piledrived him onto the stage. While beginning a feud with Styles, the Bound for Glory Series winner, Ray was also dealing with the implosion of Aces & Eights. On October 20 at Bound for Glory, Ray lost the TNA World Heavyweight Championship to Styles in a No Disqualification match, ending his reign at 66 days.

On the following episode of Impact Wrestling, Ray was attacked by the returning Mr. Anderson, who later in the evening, cost Ray his title rematch with Styles. Two weeks later, after teasing a break-up with Aces & Eights, the group ambushed Anderson in retaliation. On November 21, at Turning Point, Mr. Anderson and Bully Ray faced off in a match where it was Anderson's career vs. the Aces & Eights stable. Anderson won, forcing the end of the Aces & Eights.

On February 13, 2014, Bully Ray lost to Mr. Anderson in a Casket match, ending the feud.

==== Feud with the Carters and TNA Hall of Fame (2014–2015) ====
On March 9, Bully Ray was introduced by Dixie Carter to be the special guest referee for the Eight-Man Lethal Lockdown match at Lockdown. During the match, he attacked Team Dixie's captain, Bobby Roode, allowing Team MVP to be victorious, turning face once again. Ray then feuded with Roode, culminating in a match at Sacrifice; Carter interfered and cost Ray the match. Over the following weeks, Ray invaded TNA Headquarters and Dixie Carter's home, threatening to put her through a table. On May 22, Dixie and Ethan Carter III came out to confront MVP and his alliance for their actions. But, when Ray interrupted the confrontation, he was ultimately laid out by MVP's alliance and put through a table by EC3. On June 5, MVP along with EC3 and Rockstar Spud challenged Ray, Austin Aries and Samoa Joe to a First Blood Match, which Bully and his team won after Bully hit EC3 with a steel chain. At Slammiversary, Ray was defeated by EC3 after Bully went through a table from the top rope. Later that night it was announced that Ray, along with Devon, would be inducted into the TNA Hall of Fame as Team 3D at Bound for Glory. On August 7, Bully Ray finally succeeded in putting Dixie Carter through a table. At Bound for Glory, Team 3D defeated Tommy Dreamer and Abyss. This event was the final contracted date for each member of Team 3D.

On the May 8, 2015 episode of Impact Wrestling, Ray made a one-night appearance as the special guest referee for the TNA World Heavyweight Championship match between Kurt Angle and Eric Young. On the July 15 episode of Impact Wrestling, Bully made his return to TNA, where he was revealed by Dixie Carter as the new general manager. However, it was announced on July 24 that Ray had departed from the company, due to being unhappy with the "current state of affairs within the company."

=== Independent circuit (2013–2015) ===
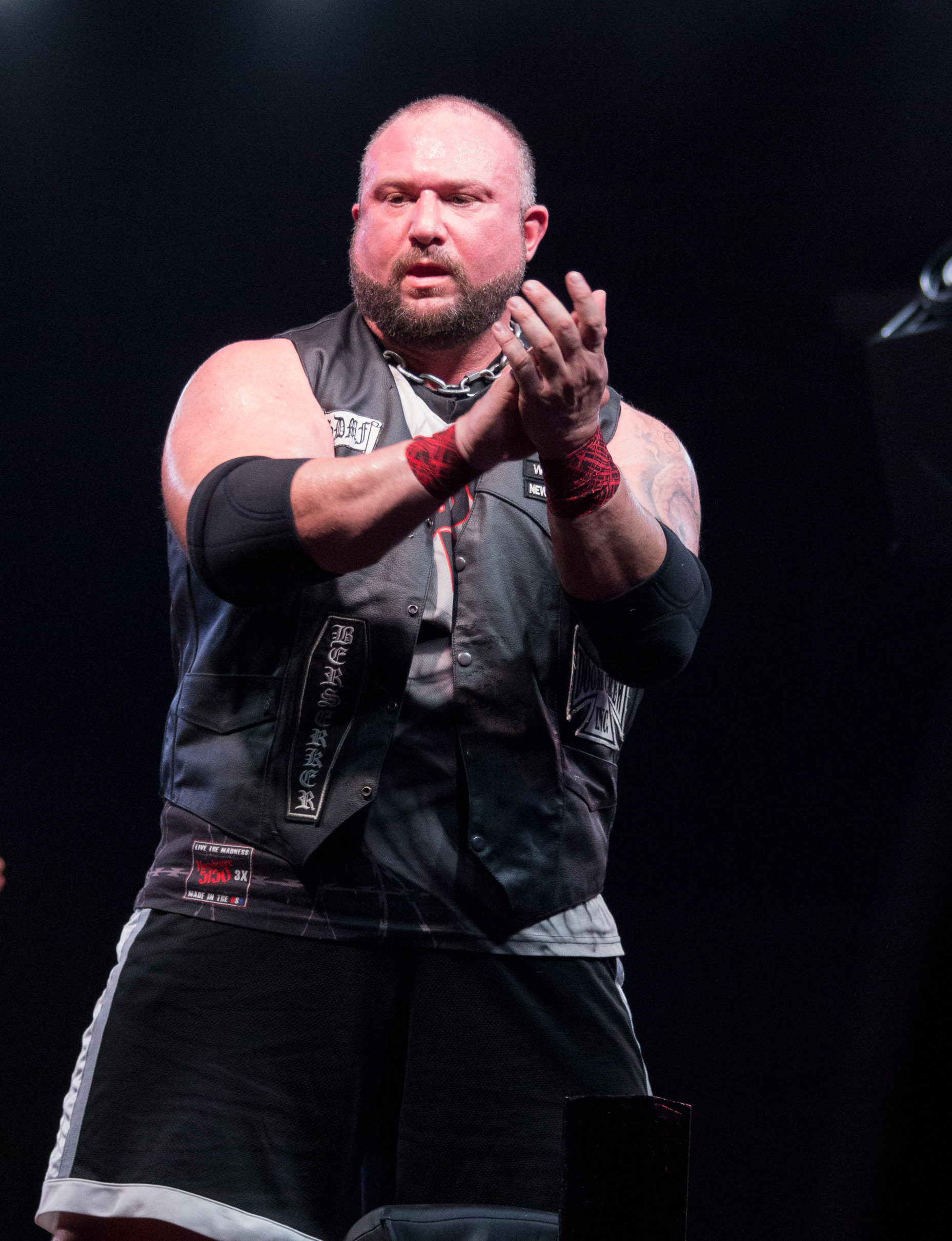
Bully Ray in 2015

Starting in late 2013, Bully Ray and Devon were something of a fixture within Tommy Dreamer's House of Hardcore promotion. On November 9, 2013, at HoH 3, Ray attacked Dreamer and Terry Funk following the main event, claiming that Dreamer offended him by not inviting him to the show, before challenging Dreamer to a falls-count-anywhere street fight at the TNA One Night Only pay-per-view event Old School. Spike Dudley came out to make the save only to be beaten by Ray as well, whereas Devon appeared to confront Bully—only to turn around and aid him as the two hit Dreamer with a 3D, then fended off an attempted save by the Sandman.

Team 3D were also scheduled to officially team together against Dreamer and Abyss, then against Bad Influence (Christopher Daniels and Frankie Kazarian), on June 6 and 7, 2014 at House of Hardcore 4 and 5 respectively. However, Ray would be pulled out of both events by TNA President Dixie Carter, turning the on-screen feud between Ray and Carter in TNA into a crossover storyline involving talent associated with both promotions. On July 13, 2014, Team 3D defeated Kevin Steen and Jason Axe to win the 2CW Tag Team Championship. At House of Hardcore VII, Team 3D defeated Killer Elite Squad.

On February 7, 2015, Ray defeated Dom Vitalli to win the Destiny Wrestling Organization (DWO) Heavyweight Championship.

=== Return to WWE (2015–2018) ===
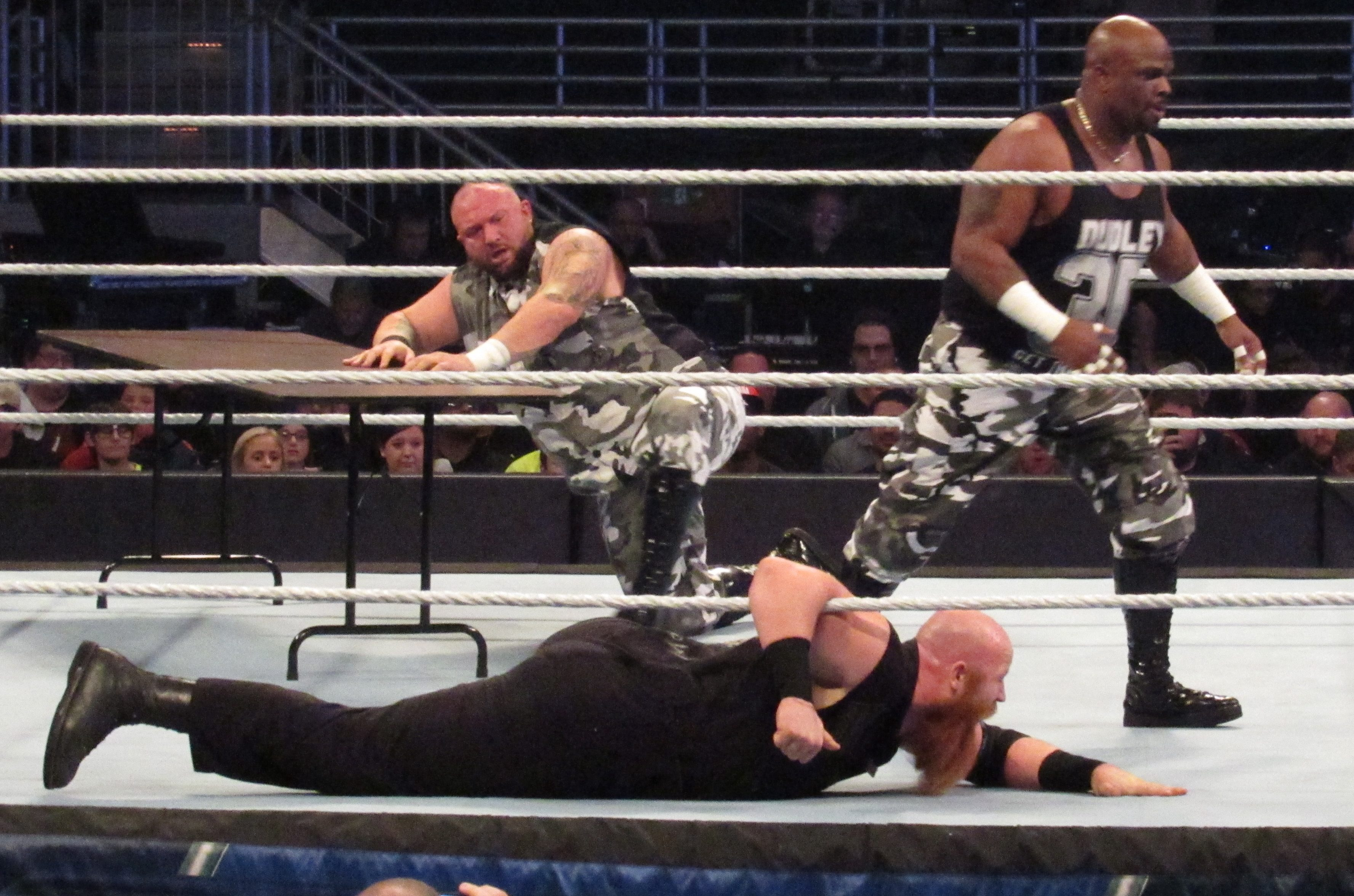
The Dudley Boyz wrestling The Wyatt Family in January 2016

LoMonaco made a one night appearance with WWE at the 2015 Royal Rumble entering as a surprise entrant at number 3, reprising his Bubba Ray Dudley character. He eliminated The Miz and R-Truth before being eliminated by Bray Wyatt.

On the August 24, 2015 episode of Raw, he and D-Von Dudley made a surprise return to the WWE, reviving their Dudley Boyz tag team persona. They attacked the WWE Tag Team Champions, The New Day, and gave a 3D through a table to Xavier Woods. On the August 27 episode of SmackDown, they defeated The Ascension and after the match they put Viktor through a table. On the August 31 episode of Raw, they wrestled their first match on the show in 10 years against The New Day in a winning effort. Following the match, they would attempt to 3D Big E through a table, but Big E would be saved by Woods and Kofi Kingston. On the September 3 episode of SmackDown, The Dudley Boyz defeated The Prime Time Players. At both Night of Champions, and Live from Madison Square Garden, the Dudley Boyz challenged The New Day for the WWE Tag Team Championship, but would win both matches by disqualification, which allowed New Day to retain their titles. At Hell in a Cell, the Dudley Boyz would challenge for the titles again, where they would be defeated by New Day. At Survivor Series, the Dudley Boyz would team with Goldust, Neville and Titus O'Neil to defeat Stardust, The Ascension, The Miz and Bo Dallas in a 5-on-5 traditional Survivor Series elimination tag team match.

From the November 23 episode of Raw, the Dudley Boyz began a short rivalry with The Wyatt Family, and later aligned themselves with the returning Tommy Dreamer and Rhino in the feud. At TLC: Tables, Ladders and Chairs, The Wyatt Family defeated The ECW Originals in an eight-man elimination tables match.

On the December 31 episode of SmackDown, the Dudley Boyz teamed with Kalisto in a winning effort against The New Day in six-man tag team match. They would face The New Day in a rematch on the January 4, 2016, episode of Raw in a losing effort. At Royal Rumble, the Dudley Boyz would compete in a Fatal 4-Way tag team match on the pre-show for a spot in the Royal Rumble match itself, with the match being won by Mark Henry and Jack Swagger.

On the February 8 episode of Raw, the Dudley Boyz attacked The Usos after a match involving them against The New Day and Mark Henry, thus turning heel in the process. Explaining that they did not come back to WWE to be a "nostalgia act" and reminding the fans that they are "the baddest tag team on the planet", the Dudley Boyz abandoned using tables. In the following weeks, the Dudley Boyz and The Usos began a feud, setting up a tag team match between the two teams at WrestleMania 32, where the Dudley Boyz lost to The Usos. The following night on Raw, the Dudley Boyz defeated The Usos in a tables match, breaking their vow to never again use tables and officially ending the feud. Afterwards, the duo were interrupted by the debuting Enzo Amore and Colin Cassady, who proceeded to insult them and ignite a new feud. In a tournament set up by Shane McMahon to determine the new number 1 contenders to the WWE Tag Team Championship, they would defeat the Lucha Dragons to advance to the semi-finals, where they clashed with Amore and Cassady in a losing effort. On July 19 at the 2016 WWE draft, the Dudley Boyz were drafted to Raw. At SummerSlam, they would lose to Sami Zayn and Neville.

The Day after SummerSlam, the Dudley Boyz announced that they were announcing their departure from WWE on that night's Raw. During their farewell segment, they were confronted by The Shining Stars. After receiving insults from The Shining Stars, the Dudley Boyz attacked them, turning face once again in the process. As they set up Primo for a 3D through a table, Luke Gallows and Karl Anderson attacked both Bubba Ray and D-Von, sending D-Von through the table.

On January 22, 2018, the Dudley Boyz appeared on the Raw 25 Years episode when they interrupted a fight between the team of Heath Slater and Rhyno and Titus Worldwide (Apollo Crews and Titus O'Neil), and gave a 3D to Heath Slater through a table. The Dudley Boyz were inducted into the WWE Hall of Fame Class of 2018.

=== Return to the independent circuit (2016–2017) ===
On August 28, 2016, it was announced that Team 3D would be competing at Insane Championship Wrestling's Fear and Loathing IX event on November 20, 2016.

On September 17, 2016, at House of Hardcore 18, LoMonaco reprised his Bully Ray character as he saved Tommy Dreamer from "Broken" Matt Hardy. He later threatened Hardy that he would put him on the table like what he did to Dixie Carter.

At Delete WCPW, LoMonaco defeated Hardy in a No Disqualification Match with the help from Adam Pacitti. He was defeated by Drew Galloway in a No Disqualification Match for the WCPW Championship.

=== Ring of Honor (2017–2020) ===
==== Storyline with the Briscoes (2017–2018) ====
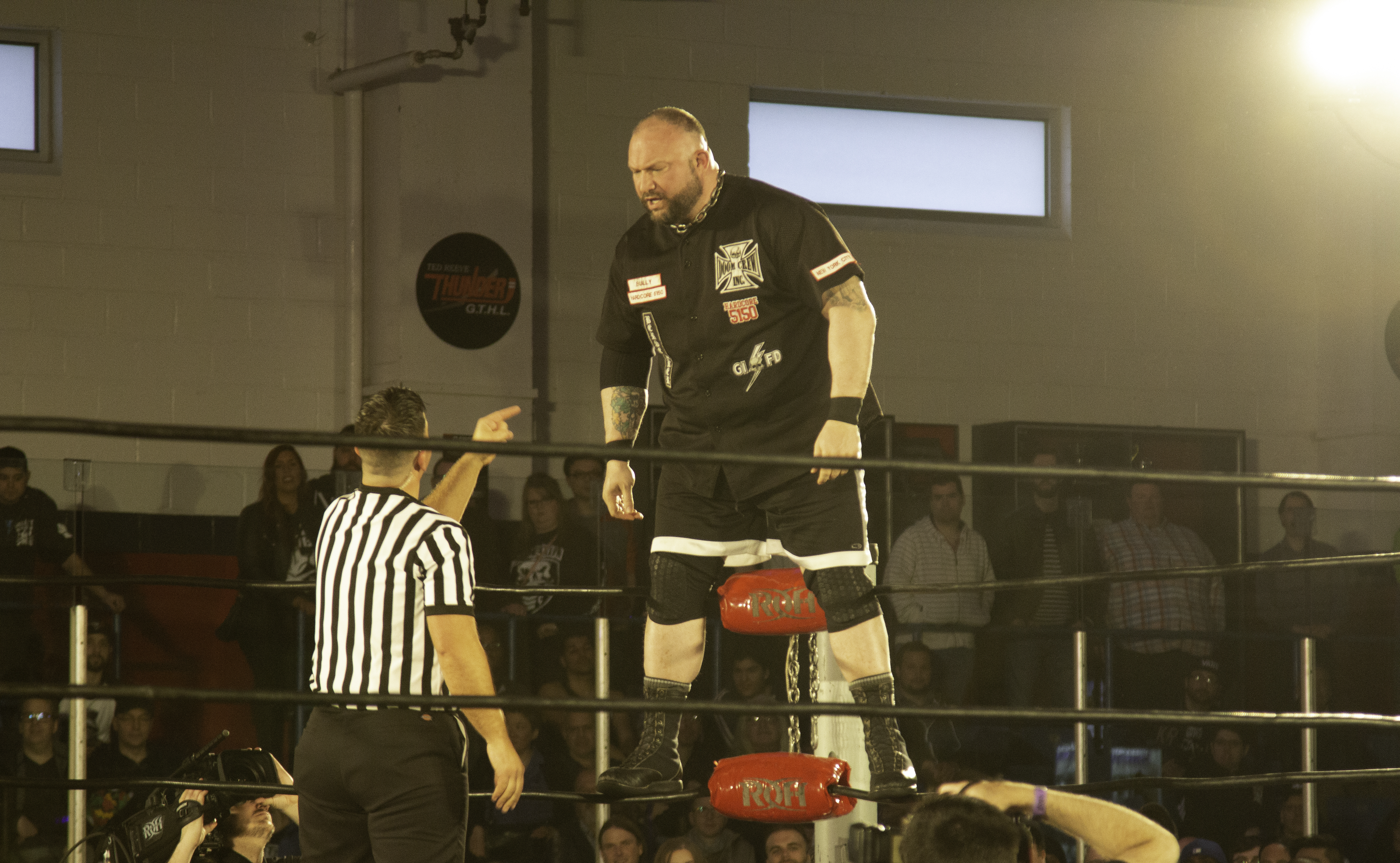
Bully Ray signed with ROH in 2017.

At Manhattan Mayhem VI, LoMonaco made his ROH debut by saving the Briscoe Brothers (Jay Briscoe and Mark Briscoe) and Bobby Fish from Bullet Club, by putting Adam Cole through a table. On March 10, at the ROH 15th Anniversary Show, Ray would team with the Briscoes as they defeated War Machine (Hanson and Raymond Rowe) and Davey Boy Smith Jr. On March 11, Ray and the Briscoes defeated The Kingdom to win the ROH World Six-Man Tag Team Championship. On April 1, 2017, at Supercard of Honor XI, Ray and the Briscoes successfully defended the ROH World Six-Man Tag Team Championship against Bullet Club (Hangman Page, Tama Tonga and Tanga Loa). They lost the title to Dalton Castle and The Boys on June 23. Ray and the Briscoes challenged for the title again on September 22 at Death Before Dishonor XV, but they were defeated by Page and The Young Bucks, when Jay turned on Ray. Afterwards, Ray started teasing his retirement from professional wrestling. On October 20, Mark Briscoe also turned on Ray, joining Jay in attacking him and Tommy Dreamer, when Velvet Sky came to Ray's aid during his attack. Ray's last match took place at Final Battle, teaming with Dreamer against The Briscoes, losing in a New York Street Fight. Ray confirmed he is retired on February 10, 2018, on his official Twitter page. However, he still made appearances for Ring of Honor as an enforcer.

==== Final storylines and departure (2018–2020) ====
On April 7, 2018, at Supercard of Honor XII, Bully Ray turned heel by powerbombing Cheeseburger. On the May 12 episode of ROF Wrestling, Ray was confronted by Cheeseburger; they exchanged a quick staredown, before Ray chokeslammed Cheeseburger. The ROH COO Joe Koff came out and told Ray that he was done being an enforcer. Ray told Koff that he unretired. On December 14, at Final Battle, Ray was defeated by Flip Gordon in an "I Quit" match.

On April 1, 2020, Ray left Ring of Honor after his contract expired.

=== National Wrestling Alliance (2022–2023) ===
On June 11, 2022, Ray was the special guest commentator for the NWA World Women's Championship at Alwayz Ready. On the June 14 episode of NWA Powerrr, Bully Ray, special master of ceremonies for the night, was confronted by Mike Knox and VSK of the Cardona Family. Knox initially acted in kind to Ray, due to their past as members of Aces & Eights in Impact Wrestling. However, after accusing Ray of "leaving him high and dry" in Impact, Knox and VSK would attack him before putting him through a table. At NWA 74th Anniversary Show he defeated Knox in a Tables match. On the following episode of Powerrr, Ray started a rivalry with Matt Cardona, after Cardona interrupted his interview with Kyle Davis. The rivalry between Ray and Cardona continued on February 11, 2023, at Nuff Said, Ray helped NWA Worlds Heavyweight Champion Tyrus, who agreed to give Ray a title shot anytime he wanted.

On April 7, at NWA 312, Ray defeated NWA World Television Champion Thom Latimer by disqualification, after Latimer would not stop attacking Ray in the corner. Prior to this, Ray went and grabbed Latimer's Television title, grabbed a microphone, and started talking about Kamille.

=== Return to Impact/TNA (2022–2023) ===
On October 7, 2022, Ray returned to Impact Wrestling at Bound for Glory where he would win the Intergender Call Your Shot Gauntlet for a championship match of his choosing. On November 18 at Over Drive, Ray defeated Moose in a Tables match. Later in the show, Ray would confront Impact World Champion Josh Alexander and invoked his opportunity at Hard To Kill, which Alexander accepted. Ray attacked Alexander and threatened to piledrive his wife Jen, turning heel in the process. On January 13, 2023, at Hard To Kill, Ray was unsuccessful at winning the Impact World Championship from Alexander. After Hard To Kill, Ray would enter a feud with former friend Tommy Dreamer, with Dreamer challenging Ray to match for Sacrifice. On March 24 at the event, Ray defeated Dreamer in Busted Open match, after The Good Hands (Jason Hotch and John Skyler) made Dreamer bleed, while the referee was knocked out. On April 16 at Rebellion, Ray competed in a 10-wrestler Hardcore War teaming with Brian Myers, Kenny King, Masha Slamovich and Moose, facing Dreamer, Bhupinder Gujjar, Frankie Kazarian, Killer Kelly and Yuya Uemura, in a losing effort.

On May 26 at Under Siege, Ray came from behind and strangled President of Impact Wrestling Scott D'Amore with a cable. Ray and Impact World Champion Steve Maclin put D'Amore through a flaming table. On June 9 at Against All Odds, Ray competed in the 8-4-1 match, when D'Amore struck Ray with a steel chair to incapacitate him. On the June 15 episode of Impact!, Ray cut a promo that revealed he filed a complaint with the Anthem Sports & Entertainment Board of Directors about D'Amore's involvement in his business. D'Amore confronted Ray soon after, saying that the board advised that he take a leave of absence from his duties as president. D'Amore also said he agreed with the board, though only because it allowed him to attack Ray right then and there. Maclin would soon come out and assist Ray once again before PCO appeared and took out both men. On July 15 at Slammiversary, Ray teamed with Deaner losing to D'Amore and his mystery partner which was Eric Young.

On September 14 at Impact 1000, Ray teamed up with Brother Devon reuniting Team 3D, winning over The Desi Hit Squad (Rohit Raju and Champagne Singh). After the match, Team 3D put Singh through a table turning Ray face in the process. on the October 5 episode of Impact!, Ray, Myers, KiLynn King, Jody Threat and Shera lost to Champagne Singh, Dirty Dango, Eric Young, Jake Something and Jordynne Grace. On October 21, at Bound for Glory, Ray pushed Maclin off the top rope through a barbed wire table. Later in the night, Ray was a participant in the 20-person Intergender Call Your Shot Gauntlet, eliminating KiLynn King, before being eliminated by Jordynne Grace. on the November 16 episode of Impact!, Ray and Jordynne Grace defeated Maclin and KiLynn King.

=== Second return to WWE (2024–present) ===
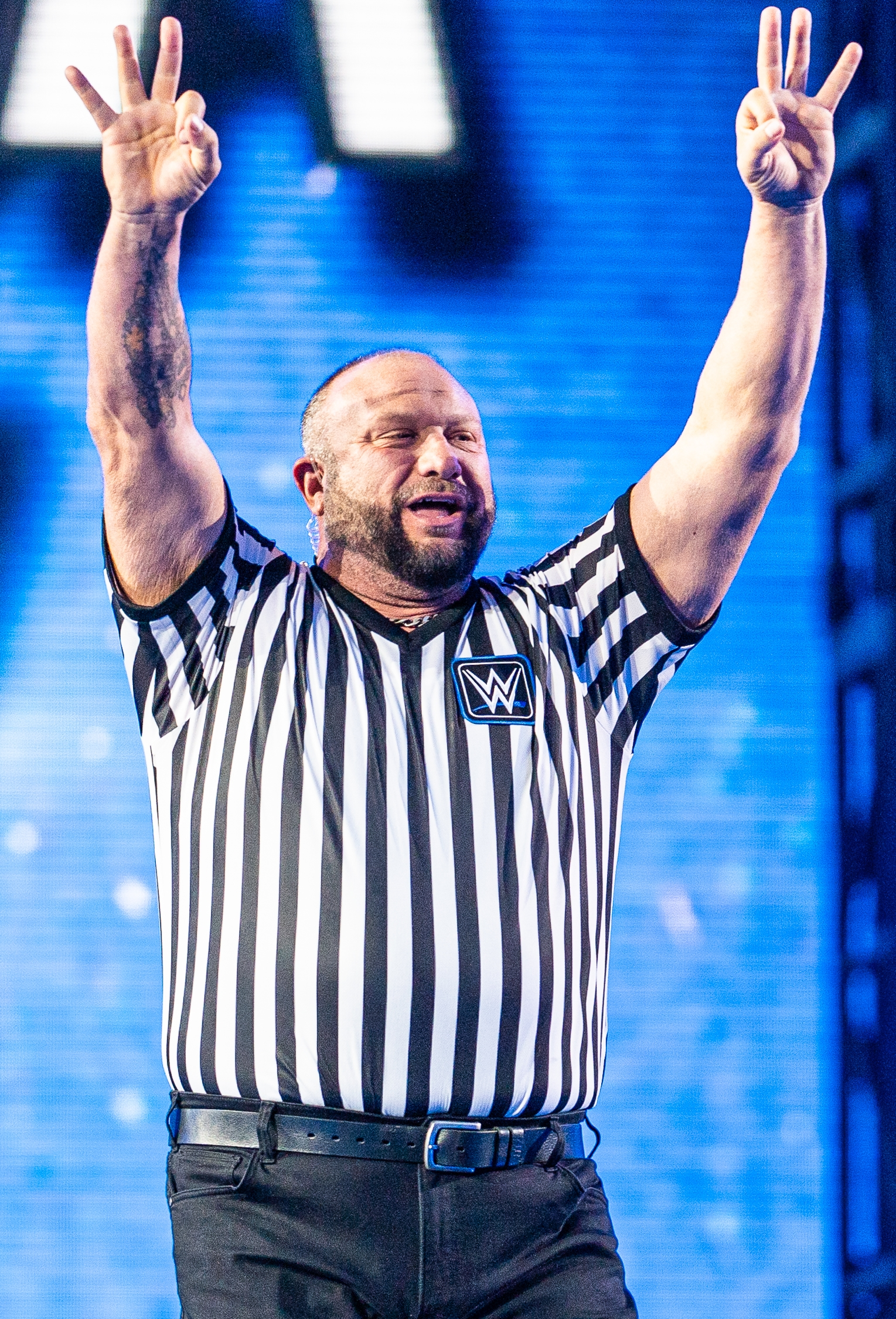
Dudley as the special guest referee at WrestleMania XL

At Night 2 of WrestleMania XL on April 7, 2024, Dudley made a guest appearance as the special guest referee for the Philadelphia Street Fight between The Final Testament (Karrion Kross and the Authors of Pain) and The Pride (Bobby Lashley and the Street Profits). After numerous spots collaborating with the latter, The Pride defeated The Final Testament. At NXT Halloween Havoc on October 27, Dudley appeared as a host of the countdown show along with SiriusXM's Busted Open podcast host Dave LaGreca. Ridge Holland, who was due to have an Ambulance match in the event, interrupted Dudley and LaGreca twice. After the NXT Championship match in the main event, Holland attacked NXT Champion Trick Williams after his successful title defense against Ethan Page. Dudley then ran into the ring to save Williams from Holland and Page. On the following episode on NXT, Dudley appeared in a segment with Williams, where Dudley initially declined the latter's offer to be his tag team partner against Ridge and Page at NXT 2300. Later on however, after being saved by Williams from an attack by Holland and Page, Dudley changed his mind and accepted Williams' offer. At NXT 2300 on November 6, Dudley and Williams lost to Holland and Page. After the match, Dudley and Williams put Page through a table that was brought to the ring by D-Von, reuniting the Dudley Boyz in WWE for the first time since 2018 in the process. In December 2024, Dudley was announced as a coach for WWE's new reality competition series LFG.

=== Maple Leaf Pro-Wrestling (2024) ===
On October 19, 2024, Ray performed in the inaugural show for Maple Leaf Pro Wrestling, Forged in Excellence, on both of its two-night shows. On the first night, he defeated Raj Dhesi in a tables match, whilst on the second night, he tagged with Q. T. Marshall in a losing effort against Dhesi and Bhupinder Gujjar.

=== Second return to TNA (2025) ===
On July 20, 2025 at Slammiversary, Ray returned to TNA, confronting the newly crowned TNA World Tag Team Champions The Hardys (Matt Hardy and Jeff Hardy) and announced that he and D-Von Dudley would reunite to challenge The Hardys for the tag titles at Bound for Glory on October 13. At the event he and Devon lost after going through tables and his retirement was confirmed following the match.

== Other media ==
LoMonaco appeared on the second WWE edition of the game show The Weakest Link, losing in the sudden death final to Kane, and was the strongest link in the majority of the rounds. At the start of the game, he stated that he was playing for the American Cancer Society and his "mommy".

The Wrestling Figure Checklist records LoMonaco as having 26 different action figures produced from the 1990s to 2010s by Toymakers, Jakks Pacific, and Mattel.

In 2018, LoMonaco began co-hosting the professional wrestling-themed talk show Busted Open on SiriusXM.

Alongside Hughes, LoMonaco has appeared in several wrestling video games, the most recent being WWE 2K26.

== Personal life ==
LoMonaco is of Italian descent, particularly having Sicilian roots.

LoMonaco dated Fawnfeather "Fawn" Carr, an esthetician, from 1999 to 2013. From May 2016 to November 2021, he was in a relationship with former TNA wrestler Jamie Szantyr, known professionally as Velvet Sky.

LoMonaco, along with longtime tag team partner Devon Hughes, operates a wrestling school called the Team 3D Academy of Professional Wrestling and Sports Entertainment, in Kissimmee, Florida.

== Filmography ==
Television
Year	Title	Role	Notes
2002	Weakest Link	Himself	Episode: "WWF Superstars Edition 2"
2003	The Mullets	Himself	Episode: "Smackdown"
2004	Headbangers Ball	Himself	Episode: "March 13, 2004"
2014	Guys Choice Awards	Himself	TV Special
2014	See Dad Run	Dr. Mayhem	Episode: "See Dad Get In the Ring"; credited as Mark "Bully Ray" LoMonaco
2017	Impractical Jokers	Himself	Episode: "Catastrophe"
2020	WWE Ruthless Aggression	Himself	2 episodes
2021	WWE Icons	Himself	Episode: "Rob Van Dam"
2022	Steve Austin's Broken Skull Sessions	Himself	Episode: "Bubba Ray Dudley"
2023	Paltrocast with Darren Paltrowitz	Himself	Episode: "Mickie James + Jean-Marc Mineo + Ying Julaluck Ismalone + Will Skudin + Bully Ray"
2024	WWE Rivals	Himself	2 episodes
2024	Biography: WWE Legends	Himself	3 episodes
2024	Gutfeld!	Himself	2 episodes; credited as Bully Ray Dudley
2025	WWE LFG	Himself	

Film
Year	Title	Role	Notes
1999	Beyond the Mat	Himself	Uncredited
2020	You Cannot Kill David Arquette	Himself	Credited as Bully Ray

== Championships and accomplishments ==
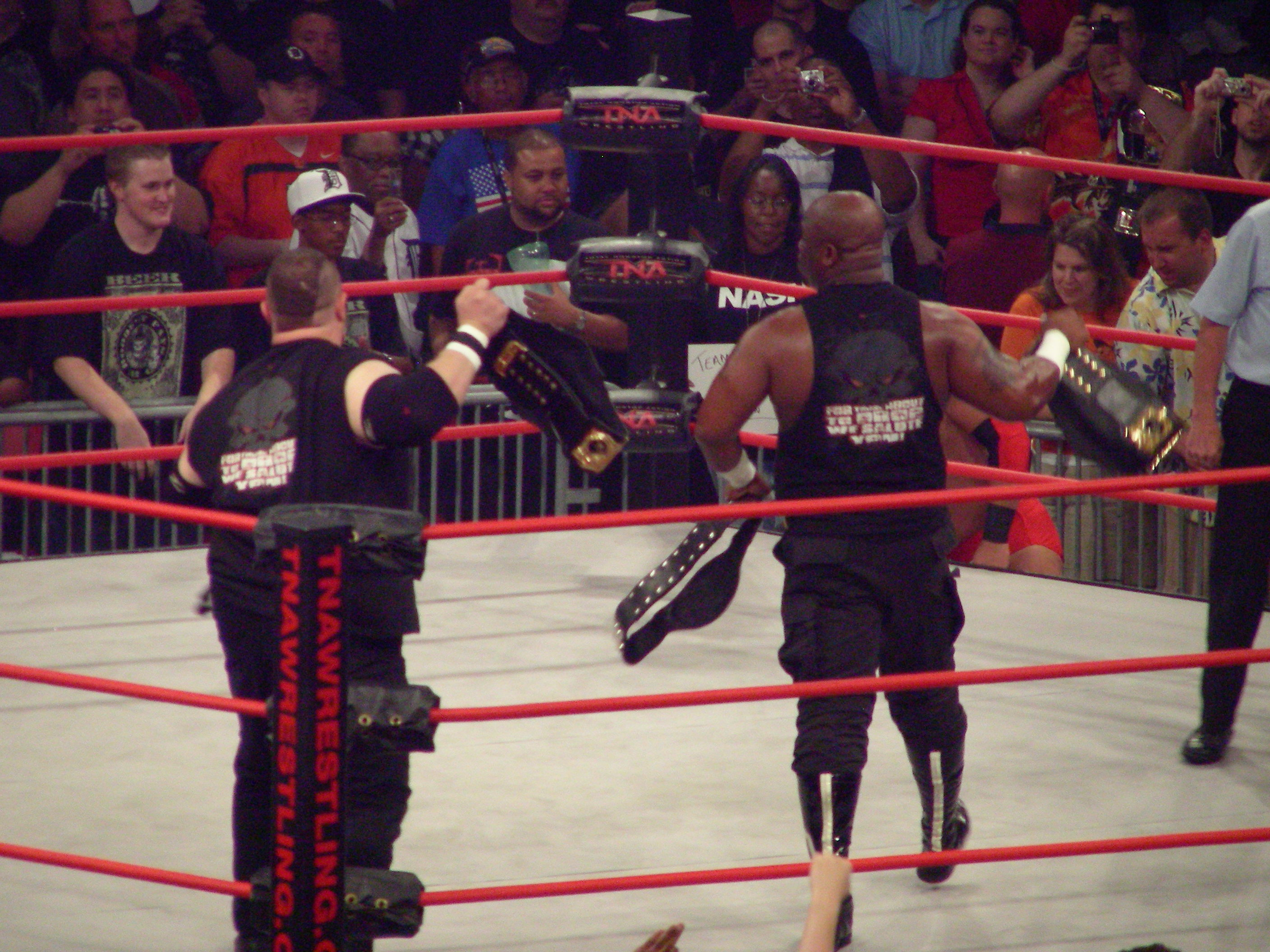
Team 3D as TNA and IWGP Tag Team Champions, titles they have held twice each

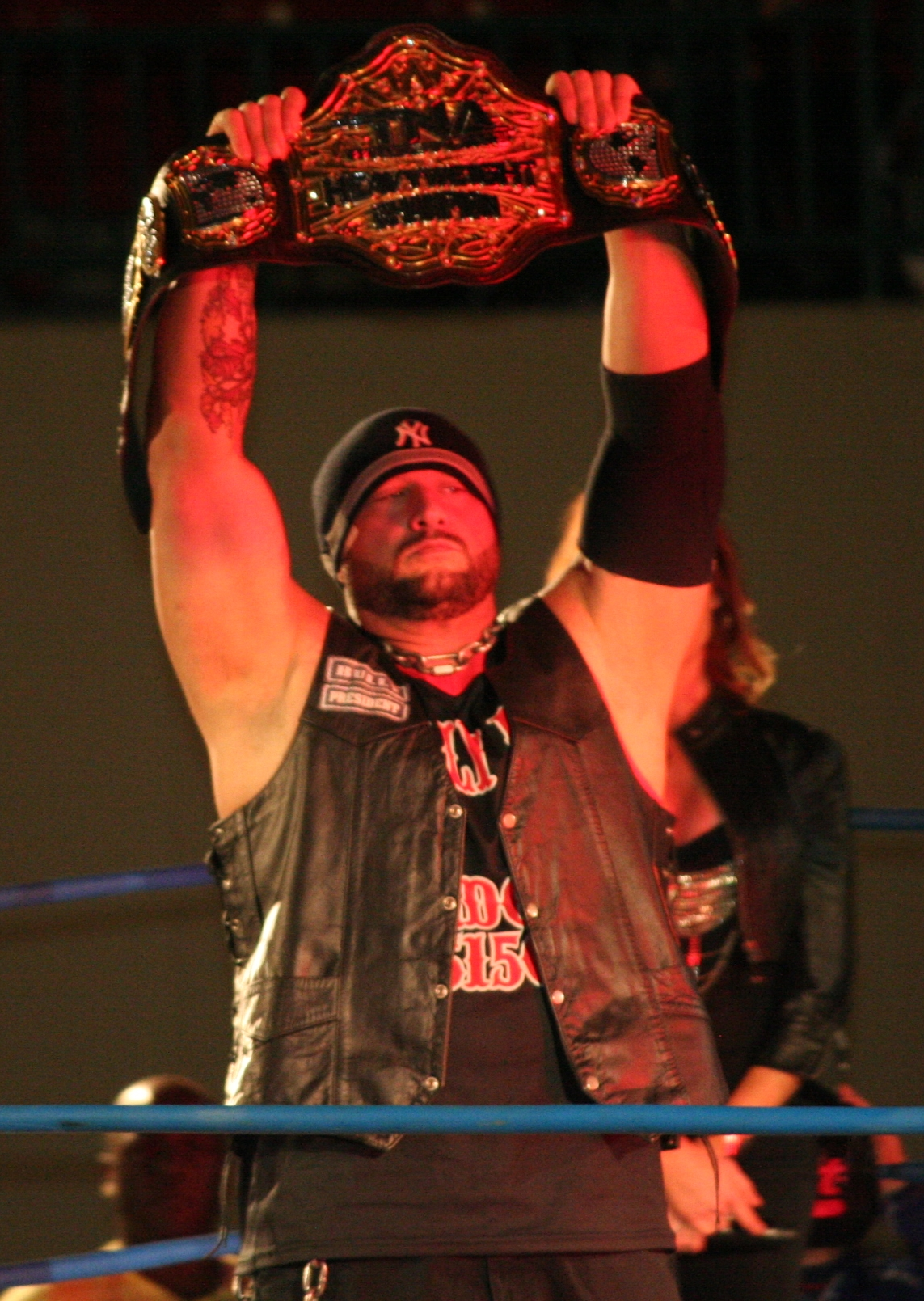
As Bully Ray, LoMonaco is a two-time TNA World Heavyweight Champion.

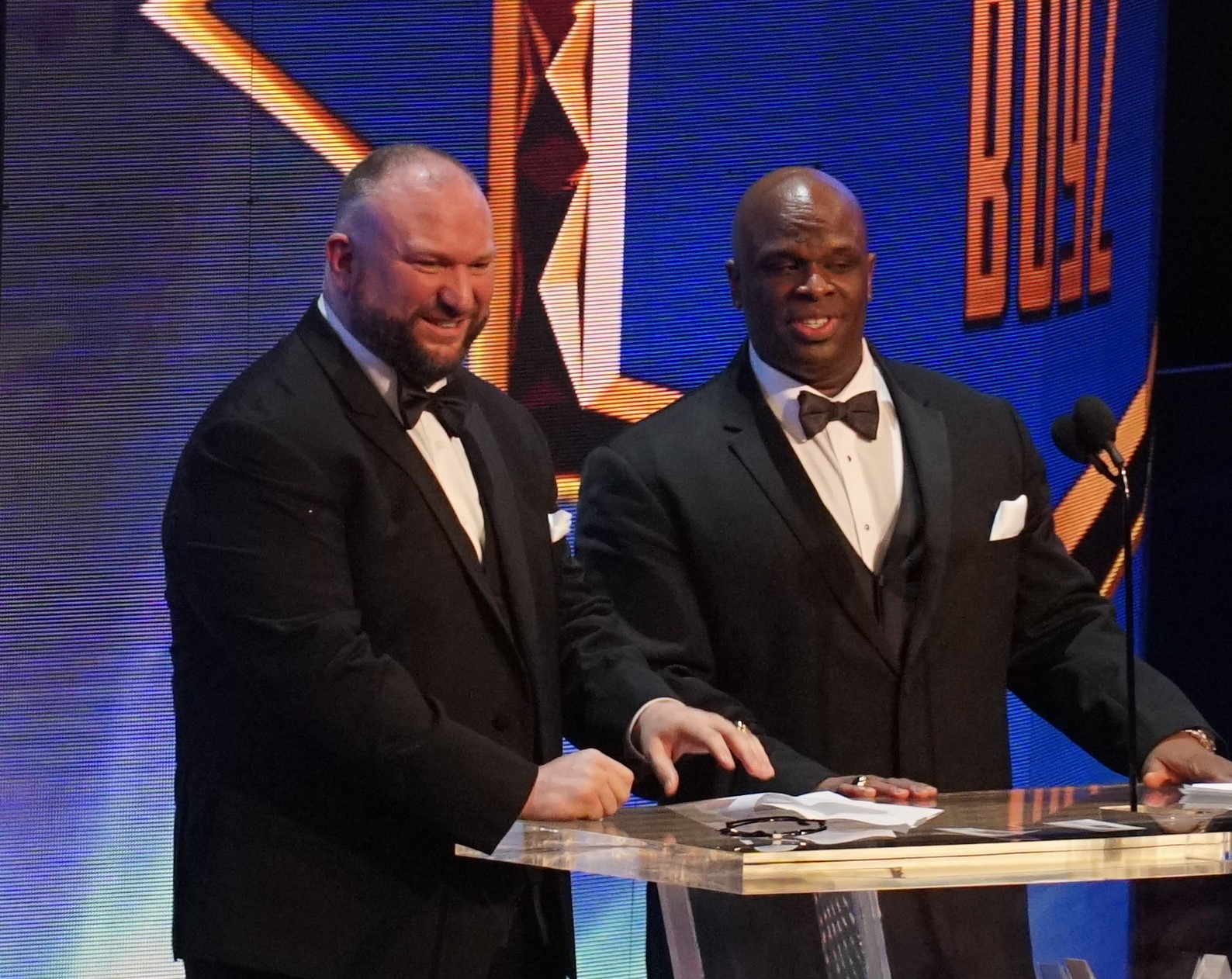
The Dudleys being inducted into the WWE Hall of Fame in 2018

- All Japan Pro Wrestling
  - World's Strongest Tag Determination League (2005) – with Brother Devon
- The Baltimore Sun
  - Tag Team of the Year (2007) – with Brother Devon
- Cauliflower Alley Club
  - Other honoree (1997) – with Brother Devon
- Destiny Wrestling Organization
  - DWO Heavyweight Championship (1 time)
- Extreme Championship Wrestling
  - ECW World Tag Team Championship (8 times) – with D-Von Dudley
- Hardcore Hall of Fame
  - Class of 2024 (with D'Von Dudley)
- House of Glory
  - HOG Crown Jewel Championship (1 time)
- Hustle
  - Hustle Super Tag Team Championship (1 time, final) – with Brother Devon
- New Japan Pro-Wrestling
  - IWGP Tag Team Championship (2 times) – with Brother Devon
- Pennsylvania Premier Wrestling
  - PPW Heavyweight Championship (1 time)
- Pro Wrestling Illustrated
  - Match of the Year (2000) with D-Von Dudley vs. Edge and Christian and The Hardy Boyz in a Triangle Ladder match at WrestleMania 2000
  - Match of the Year (2001) with D-Von Dudley vs. Edge and Christian and The Hardy Boyz in a Tables, Ladders, and Chairs match at WrestleMania X-Seven
  - Tag Team of the Year (2001, 2009) – with D-Von Dudley
  - Tag Team of the Decade (2000–2009) – with D-Von Dudley
  - Ranked No. 4 of the top 500 singles wrestlers in the PWI 500 in 2013
  - Ranked No. 354 of the top 500 singles wrestlers of the "PWI Years" in 2003
- Ring of Honor
  - ROH World Six-Man Tag Team Championship (1 time) – with Jay Briscoe and Mark Briscoe
- Squared Circle Wrestling
  - 2CW Tag Team Championship (1 time) – with Brother Devon
- Total Nonstop Action Wrestling/Impact Wrestling
  - TNA World Heavyweight Championship (2 times)
  - TNA World Tag Team Championship (2 times, inaugural) – with Brother Devon
  - NWA World Tag Team Championship (1 time) – with Brother Devon
  - Tag Team Tournament (2013) – with Brother Devon
  - TNA World Cup of Wrestling (2014) – with Eric Young, Gunner, Eddie Edwards, and ODB
  - Call Your Shot Gauntlet (2022)
  - TNA Hall of Fame (2014) – as a member of Team 3D
- World Wrestling Federation/Entertainment
  - WWF/E Hardcore Championship (8 times)
  - WWF/World Tag Team Championship (8 times) – with D-Von Dudley
  - WWE Tag Team Championship (1 time) – with D-Von Dudley
  - WCW Tag Team Championship (1 time) – with D-Von Dudley
  - WWE Hall of Fame (Class of 2018) as a member of The Dudley Boyz
- Wrestling Observer Newsletter
  - Worst Gimmick (2013) Aces & Eights
