= Acid-Fest: A Tribute to Trent Acid =

2010 professional wrestling event

- Promotion(s): Combat Zone Wrestling; Jersey All Pro Wrestling
- Date: July 10, 2010
- City: South Philadelphia, Pennsylvania
- Venue: Viking Hall
- Attendance: 650-750

Acid-Fest: A Tribute to Trent Acid was an interpromotional professional wrestling memorial event co-produced by the Combat Zone Wrestling (CZW) and Jersey All Pro Wrestling (JAPW) promotions, which took place on July 10, 2010, at the Viking Hall in South Philadelphia, Pennsylvania. The show was held in honor of Trent Acid, one-half of the independent wrestling tag team The Backseat Boyz with Johnny Kashmere, who died of an accidental drug overdose at his home in Philadelphia less than a month before. It was the second such event held at the venue following the Pitbull/Public Enemy Memorial Cup, an event The Backseat Boyz had participated at, in 2006. It was the 106th wrestling event held by CZW in the building, once known as the ECW Arena, surpassing the record number of events held by Extreme Championship Wrestling. Six professional wrestling matches were featured on the event's card with all the participants being among Acid's closest friends in the industry.

== Show ==
The main event was a standard wrestling match between Johnny Kashmere and Devon Moore. Kashmere was accompanied to the ring by Donnie B, a retired manager and owner of Phoenix Championship Wrestling, who agreed to make a one-time appearance at the event. It was Donnie who had paired the two together earlier in their careers. The match was originally scheduled to be a Three-Way Dance between Kashmere, Moore and CZW founder John Zandig, however, Zandig was forced to pull out when he was seriously injured in a car accident a week before the show.

Another featured match was a four-way tag team elimination match with The S.A.T., The Carnage Crew, Da Hit Squad and The H8 Club, managed by Dewey Donovan and Justice Pain, which The S.A.T. won; the match was also the first time that Da Hit Squad had wrestled as a team in six years. Homicide and B-Boy defeated Sonjay Dutt and Ruckus in a tag team match and a 6-person tag team match between Amy Lee, Missy Sampson and Annie Social, as "Acid's Angels", beat Alere Little Feather, Roxxie Cotton and Detox. The event also hosted one of the largest battle royals ever held, involving a "cast of thousands" as one reviewer called it, and included wrestlers from throughout Acid's career from personal friends to his own students. The battle royal was won by Acid's childhood friend Helter Skelter, with manager Missy Hyatt, after eliminating Big Vito.

One of the highlights of the show came when Lou E. Dangerously, in his "Danger Zone" interview segment, gave a short speech to the crowd and brought out Tod Gordon, founder of Extreme Championship Wrestling and co-promoter of Pro Wrestling Unplugged with Kashmere, who both presented a plaque to Trent Acid's parents, for "Acid's lifetime achievements in professional wrestling". He was also unexpectedly inducted into the ECW Arena Hardcore Hall of Fame by CZW owner D. J. Hyde during the event's opening ceremony. The event was free of charge with a suggested $10 minimum donation to the Trent Acid Memorial Fund to help pay for the funeral costs, a fee paid by all the wrestlers that night, and was successful in raising $7,540 by the end of the show. Additional money was raised through merchandise sales of Acid-Fest T-shirts and programs, and a memorabilia auction of a World Wrestling Entertainment watch, designed to look like a spinner belt, donated by John Cena. The show was attended by an estimated 650 to 750 fans and was filmed by several different companies, most notably Smart Mark Video and RF Video, and later released on DVD.

== Results ==
#	Results	Stipulations	Times
1	Helter Skelter (with Missy Hyatt) defeated at least 27 other participants by last eliminating Big Vito.^{[a]}	Trent Acid Memorial battle royal	Unknown
2	The Softcore Connection (Nick Berk and Z-Barr) defeated Robby Mireno and Don Montoya (with Reckless Youth)	Tag team match	Unknown
3	Acid's Angels (Amy Lee, Missy Sampson and Annie Social) (with Dr. Don Bootz and Lexx) defeated Alere Little Feather, Roxxie Cotton and Detox (with Doc Daniels)	6-person tag team match	Unknown
4	The S.A.T. (Jose Maximo and Joel Maximo) defeated The Carnage Crew (H. C. Loc and Tony DeVito), Da Hit Squad (Monsta Mack and Mafia) and The H8 Club (Nick Gage and Nate Hatred) (with Dewey Donovan and Justice Pain)	Four-way scramble tag team elimination match	Unknown
5	Homicide and B-Boy defeated Sonjay Dutt and Ruckus	Tag team match	Unknown
6	Johnny Kashmere (with Matt Walsh and Donnie B) defeated Devon Moore (with Annie Social)	Singles match	Unknown
(c) - refers to the champion prior to the match

^{a} A full list of participants was not announced beforehand, however, the majority were wrestlers involved throughout Acid's career from personal friends to his own students. The match was held using "Royal Rumble" rules starting off with four men in the ring and another two men entering the ring at regular intervals. The known participants included were: Balls Mahoney, The Messiah, Adam Flash, Rockin' Rebel, Greg Matthews, Bison Bravado, Matt Walsh, Kwame, Ron Starr, Earl Cooter, Nate Stein, Eddie Valentine, John Dahmer, Lil’ Greatness, Slayer, Deranged, Billy Angus, Danny Angus, Kid America, Flash Wheeler, Aramis, Cory Kastle, Darren Wyse, and the Dirty Rotten Scoundrelz (EC Negro and KC Blade).
