= Hardcore Hall of Fame =

Professional wrestling hall of fame

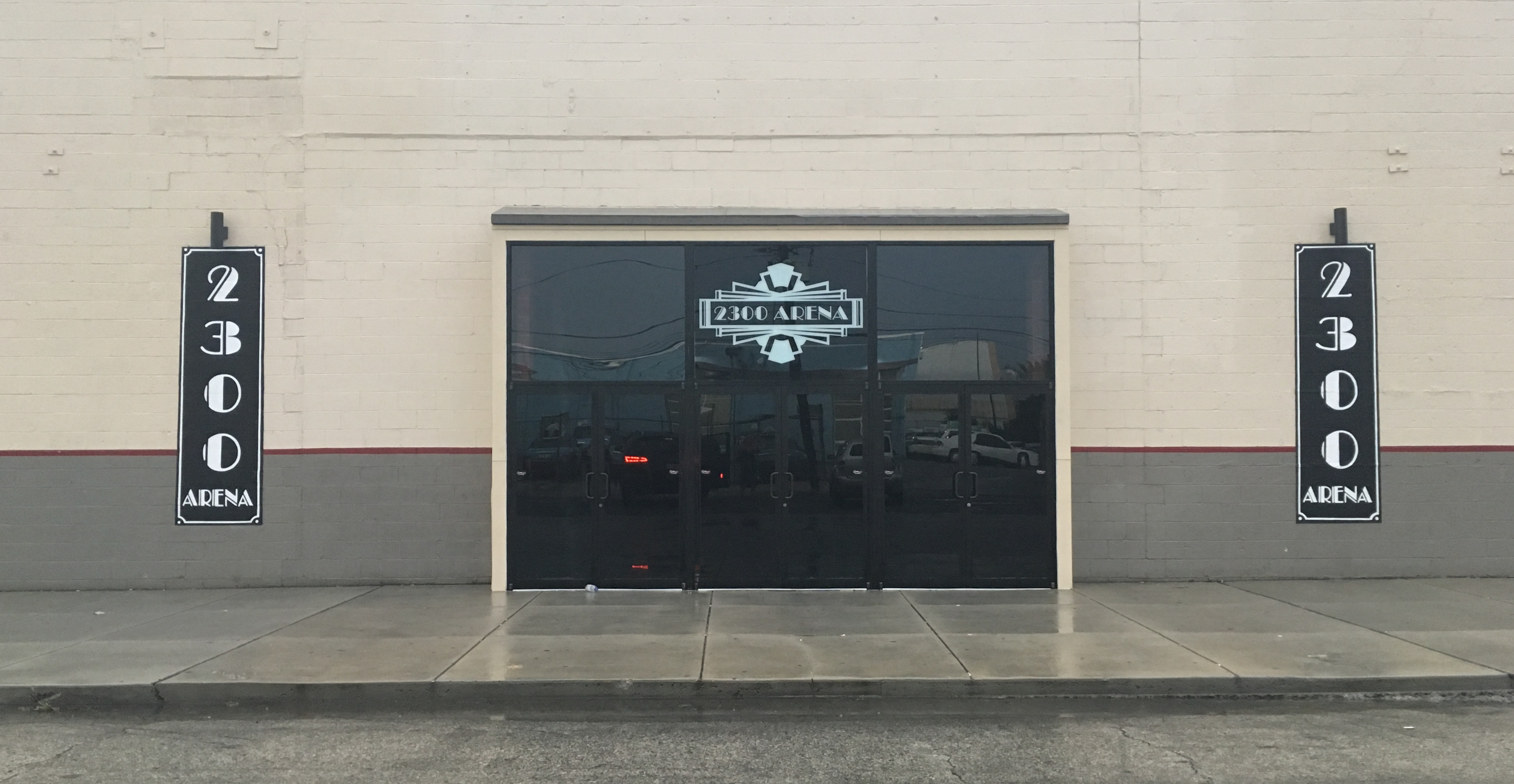
- 2300 Arena entrance
- Formation: October 19, 2002 (23 years ago)
- Location: Philadelphia, Pennsylvania, U.S.
- Members: 35 total inductees 24 Individual inductees 4 group inductee (11 wrestlers)
- Website: 2300 Arena

The Hardcore Hall of Fame is a hall of fame located within 2300 Arena in Philadelphia, Pennsylvania that was established to honor the careers of professional wrestlers and wrestling personalities who contributed to the history of 2300 Arena and hardcore wrestling.

== History ==
The Hardcore Hall of Fame was established in October 2002 following the death of former Extreme Championship Wrestling star Rocco Rock, who suffered a fatal heart attack while traveling to 2300 Arena for a match with Pro-Pain Pro Wrestling.

The Triple Threat (Bam Bam Bigelow, Chris Candido and Shane Douglas) were scheduled to be inducted at Francine's Legends of the Arena show in June 2009. However, only Candido was inducted that night after Douglas no-showed the event. Douglas was later inducted in June 2014, but Bigelow remains unenshrined.

Banners commemorating the inductees are on permanent display inside 2300 Arena.

== Inductees ==
#	Image	Year	Ring name (Birth name)	Inducted by	Notes	Ref
1		2002	Rocco Rock (Theodore James Petty)	Tod Gordon	Posthumous inductee. Four-time ECW World Tag Team Champion. His former tag-team partner Johnny Grunge was present for the ceremony.	
2		2005	Terry Funk (Terrence Funk)	Tod Gordon	Two-time ECW World Heavyweight Champion.	
3		2007	Johnny Grunge (Michael Lynn Durham)	Gary Wolfe	Posthumous inductee. Four-time ECW World Tag Team Champion.	
4		2007	The Sandman (James Fullington)	Tod Gordon	Five-time ECW World Heavyweight Champion.	
5		2008	John Zandig (John Corson)	Roger Artigiani	Founder of Combat Zone Wrestling. Six-time CZW World Heavyweight Champion.	
6		2009	Eddie Gilbert (Thomas Edward Gilbert, Jr.)	The Sandman	Posthumous inductee. First booker of Eastern Championship Wrestling. One-time ECW World Tag Team Champion.	
7		2009	Chris Candido (Christopher Barrett Candito)	The Sandman	Posthumous inductee. Three-time ECW World Tag Team Champion.	
8		2009	Tod Gordon	The Sandman	Founder of Eastern Championship Wrestling.	
9		2009	Sabu (Terry Michael Brunk)	The Sandman	Two-time ECW World Heavyweight Champion.	
10		2010	Trent Acid (Michael Verdi)	D. J. Hyde	Posthumous inductee. Four-time CZW World Tag Team Champion. Three-time CZW Junior Heavyweight Champion.	
11		2010	Jerry Lynn (Jeremy Lynn)	Jim Cornette	One-time ECW World Heavyweight Champion. One-time ROH World Champion.	
12		2010	Tommy Dreamer (Thomas James Laughlin)	Eddie Kingston	Two-time ECW World Heavyweight Champion.	
13		2011	ECW Arena Fans	Greg Excellent	In honor of the loyal fan base of ECW Arena.	
14		2014	The Blue Meanie (Brian Daniel Heffron)	Al Snow	Founder of Pro-Pain Pro Wrestling. Founding member of the Blue World Order.	
15		2014	The Pitbulls (Anthony Durante and Gary Wolfe)	Jason Knight	Anthony Durante inducted posthumously. One-time ECW World Tag Team Champions.	
16		2014	2 Cold Scorpio (Charles Bernard Scaggs)	Tod Gordon	Four-time ECW World Television Champion.	
17		2014	Shane Douglas (Troy Allan Martin)	Roger Artigiani	Four-time ECW World Heavyweight Champion. Two-time ECW World Television Champion. One-time NWA World Heavyweight Champion.	
18		2015	Dean Malenko (Dean Simon)	Justin Roberts	Two-time ECW World Television Champion. One-time ECW World Tag Team Champion.	
19		2015	Eddie Guerrero (Eduardo Gory Guerrero Llanes)	Dean Malenko	Posthumous inductee. Two-time ECW World Television Champion.	
20		2021	The Road Warriors (Joseph Laurinaitis and Michael Hegstrand)	Bubba Ray Dudley	Posthumous inductees. Their former manager Paul Ellering was present for the ceremony.	
21		2021	Charlie Bruzzese (Charles Bruzzese)	Stephen DeAngelis	Television producer for ECW and MLW.	
22		2022	Rob Van Dam (Robert Szatkowski)	Jerry Lynn	One-time ECW World Champion. One-time ECW World Television Champion. Two-time ECW World Tag Team Champion.	
23		2024	Team 3D (Devon Hughes and Mark LoMonaco)	David Adams	Eight-time ECW World Tag Team Champions.	
24		2025	Tri-State Wrestling Alliance (Anthony Matteo, Don Clyde Drake, Joel Goodhart, John Weiss, and Larry Winters)	Bay Ragni	Winters inducted posthumously. Predecessor to Extreme Championship Wrestling.	
25		2025	Nick Gage (Nicholas William Wilson)	Matt Tremont	Four-time CZW World Heavyweight Champion.	
26		2025	Missy Sampson (Melissa Sampson)	Heidi Lee Morgan	One-time PWU Unified Women's Champion.	
27		2025	Taz (Peter Senerchia)	Tony Khan	Two-time ECW World Heavyweight Champion.	
28		2026	Ruckus (Claude Marrow Jr.)	John Zandig	Three-time CZW World Heavyweight Champion.	

== Ceremony dates ==
Date	Promotion	Event	Inductee(s)	Ref
October 19, 2002	Pro-Pain Pro Wrestling	A Night for the Flyboy	Rocco Rock	
November 5, 2005	Hardcore Homecoming	November Reign	Terry Funk	
June 16, 2007	Pro Wrestling Unplugged	The Crazy 8	Johnny Grunge, The Sandman	
December 13, 2008	Combat Zone Wrestling	Cage of Death X	John Zandig	
June 27, 2009	Legends of the Arena	Legends of the Arena	Eddie Gilbert, Chris Candido, Tod Gordon, Sabu	
July 10, 2010	Combat Zone Wrestling	Acid-Fest	Trent Acid	
July 17, 2010	Ring of Honor	Ring of Honor Wrestling	Jerry Lynn	
July 25, 2010	Chikara	Chikarasaurus Rex: King of Show	Tommy Dreamer	
July 11, 2011	Combat Zone Wrestling	New Heights	ECW Arena Fans	
June 14, 2014	Wrestling with Disaster	The Final Cut	The Blue Meanie, The Pitbulls, 2 Cold Scorpio, Shane Douglas	
November 13, 2015	House of Hardcore	House of Hardcore 10	Dean Malenko, Eddie Guerrero	
September 18, 2021	Battleground Championship Wrestling	Battleground Championship Wrestling	The Road Warriors	
November 6, 2021	Major League Wrestling	War Chamber	Charlie Bruzzese	
December 17, 2022	Battleground Championship Wrestling	A Tribute to the Extreme	Rob Van Dam	
April 5, 2024	Battleground Championship Wrestling	A Tribute to the Extreme 2	Team 3D	
May 3, 2025	Tri-State Wrestling Alliance	One and Done	D. C. Drake, Joel Goodhart, Johnny Hotbody, Tony Stetson, Larry Winters	
May 31, 2025	Battleground Championship Wrestling	Original Sin	Nick Gage	
July 12, 2025	Battleground Championship Wrestling	Hot Summer Nights	Missy Sampson	
September 3, 2025	All Elite Wrestling	AEW Dynamite	Taz	
May 2, 2026	Game Changer Wrestling	One Night Only	Ruckus	

== Select banners ==
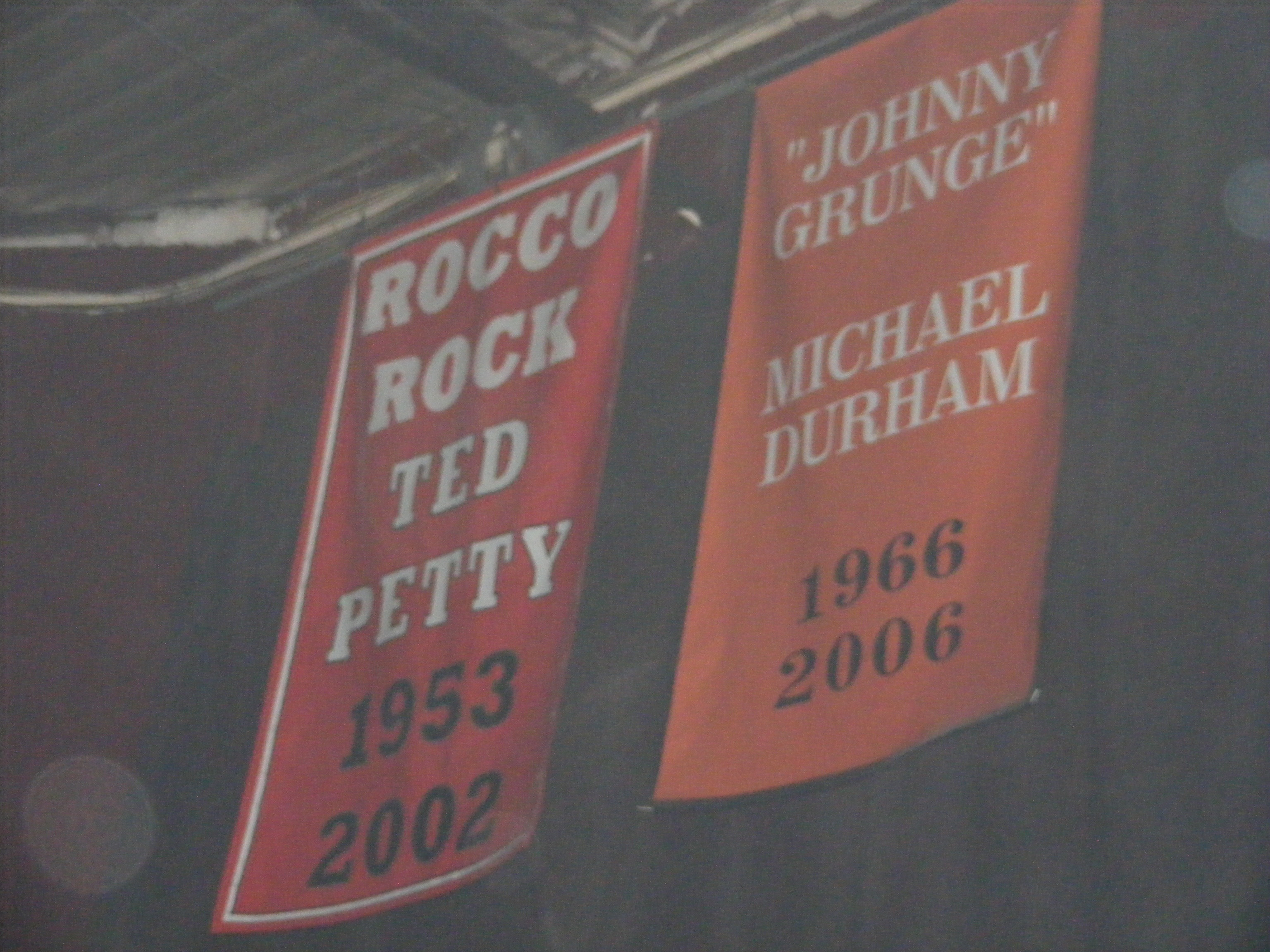
The Public Enemy

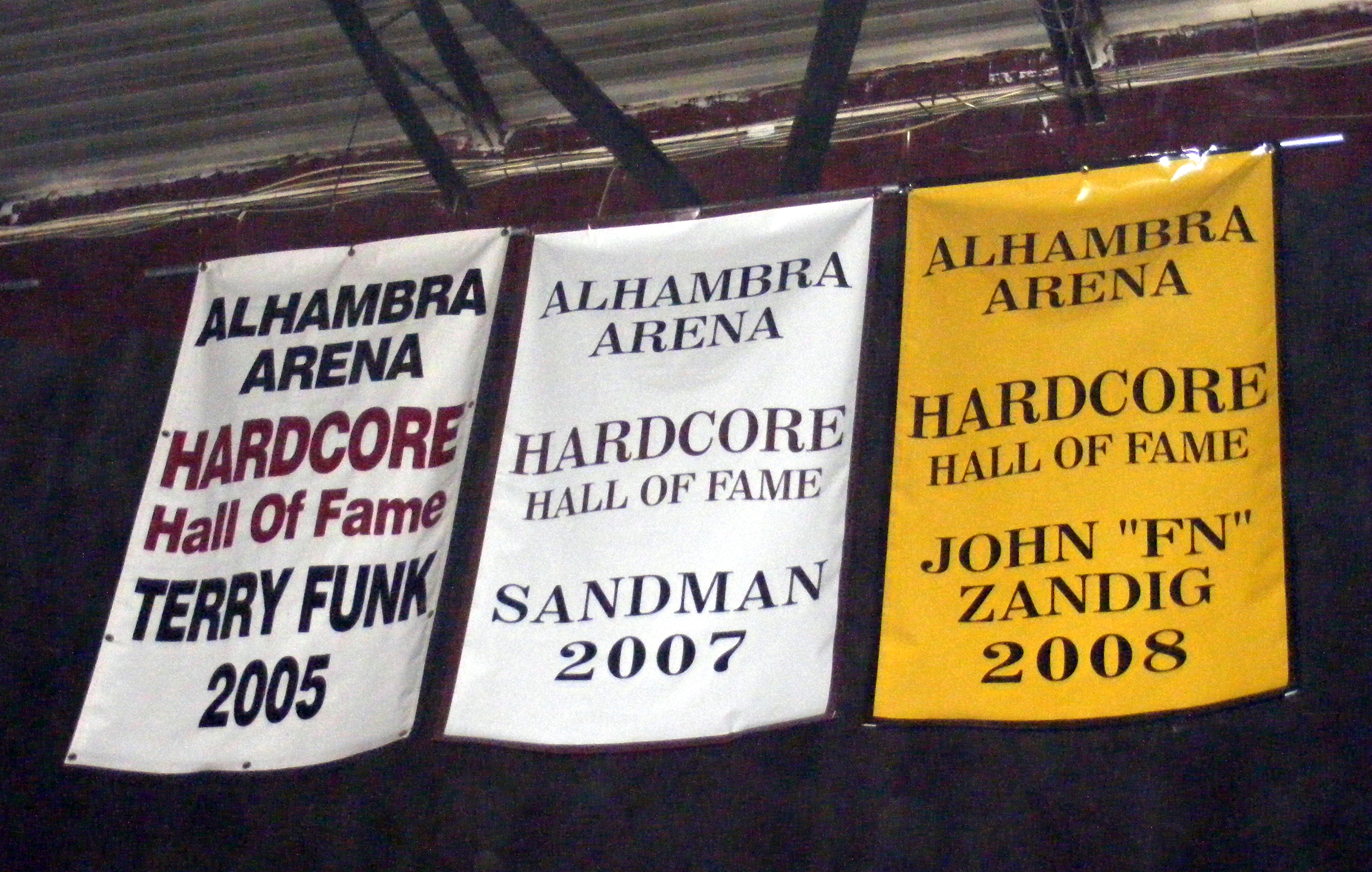
Terry Funk. The Sandman and John Zandig

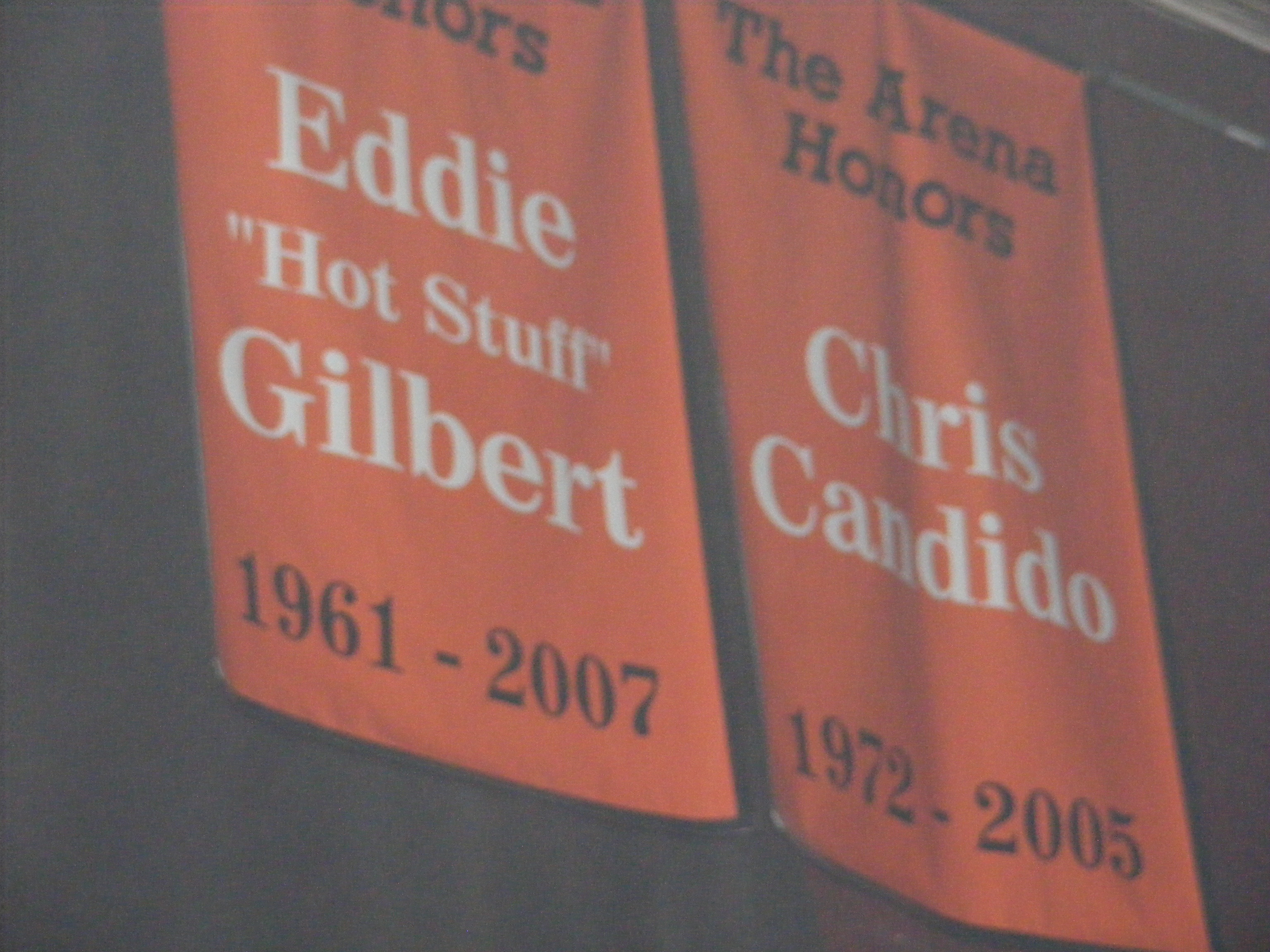
Eddie Gilbert and Chris Candido

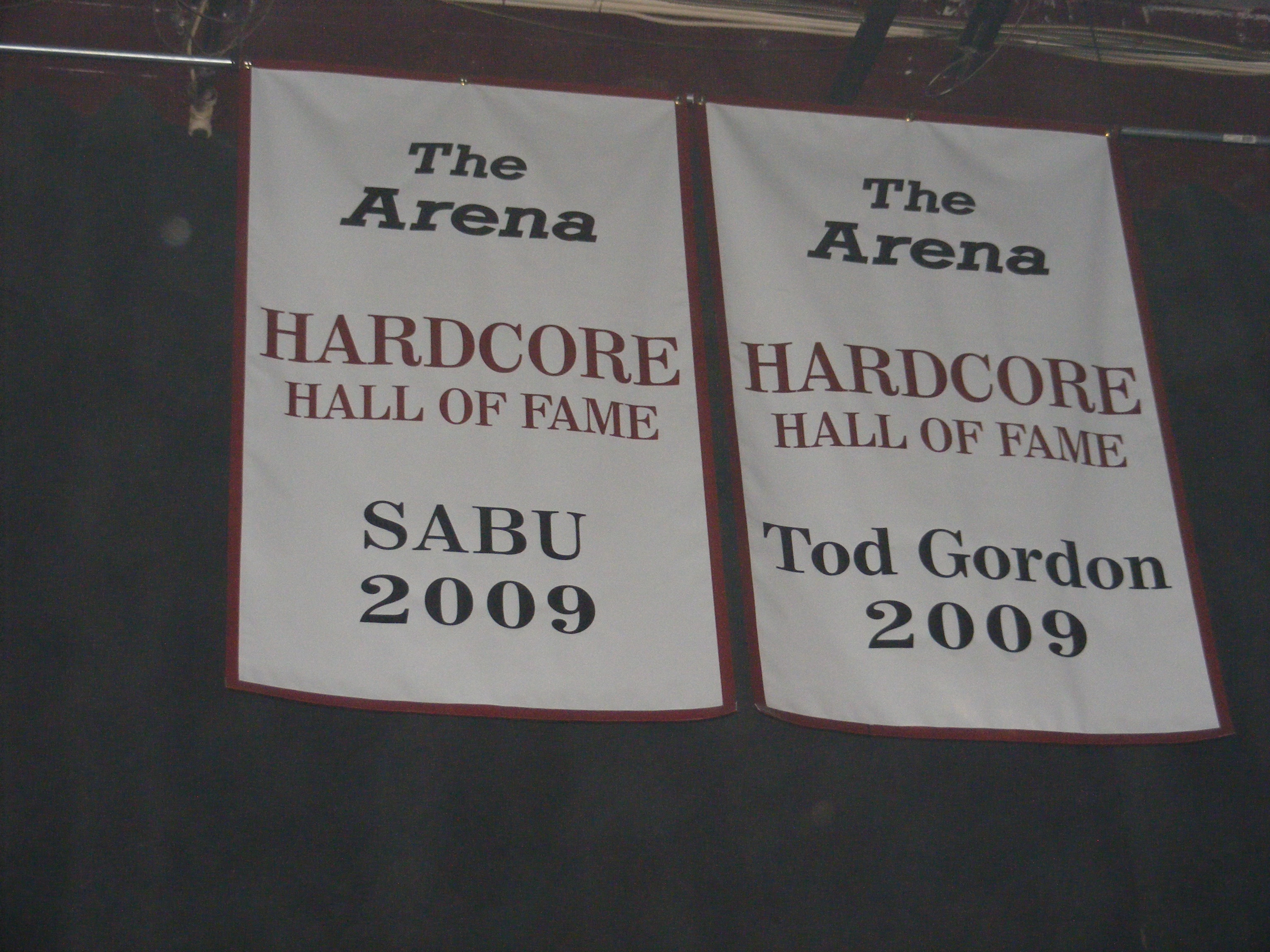
Sabu and Tod Gordon

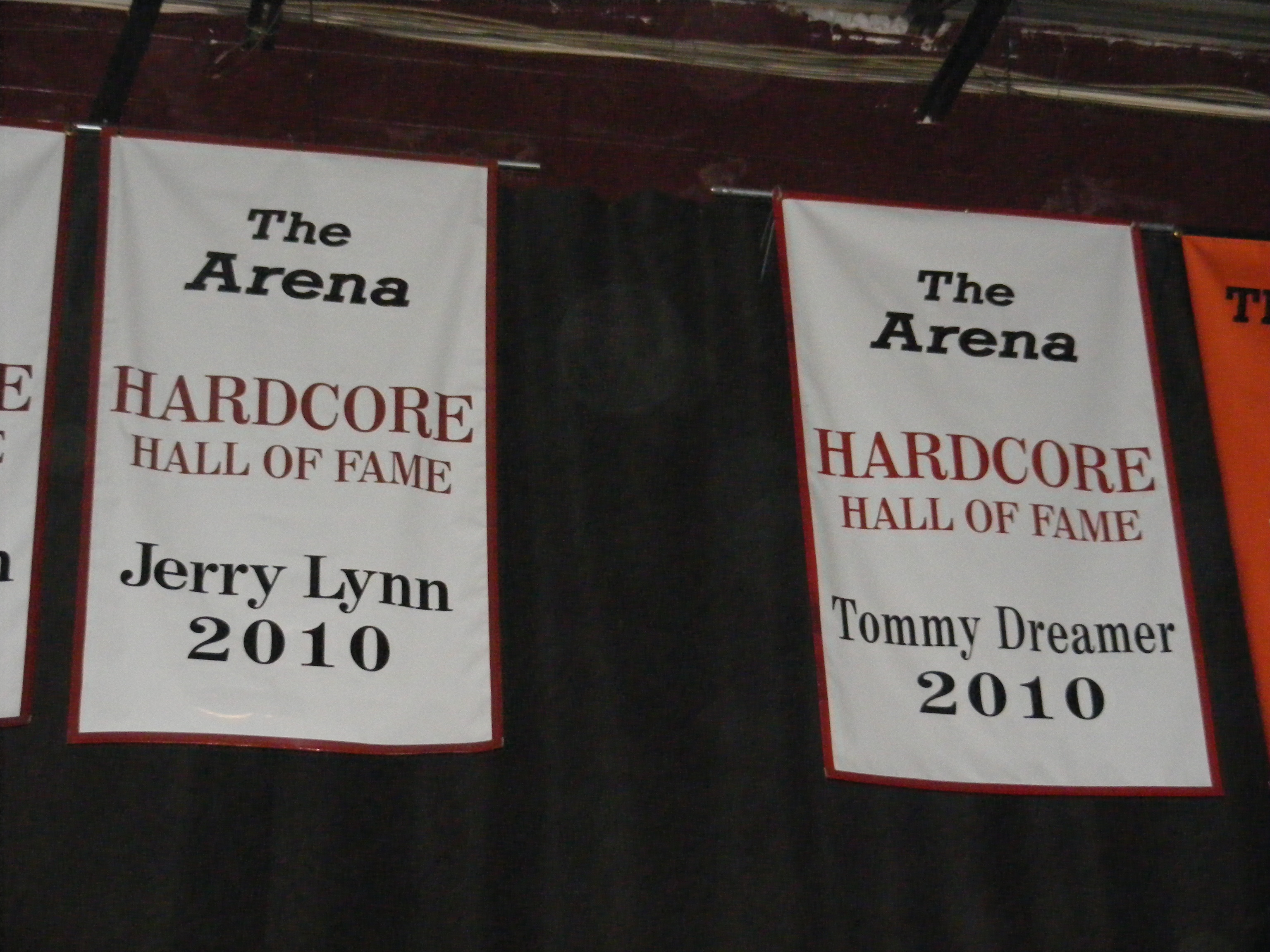
Jerry Lynn and Tommy Dreamer

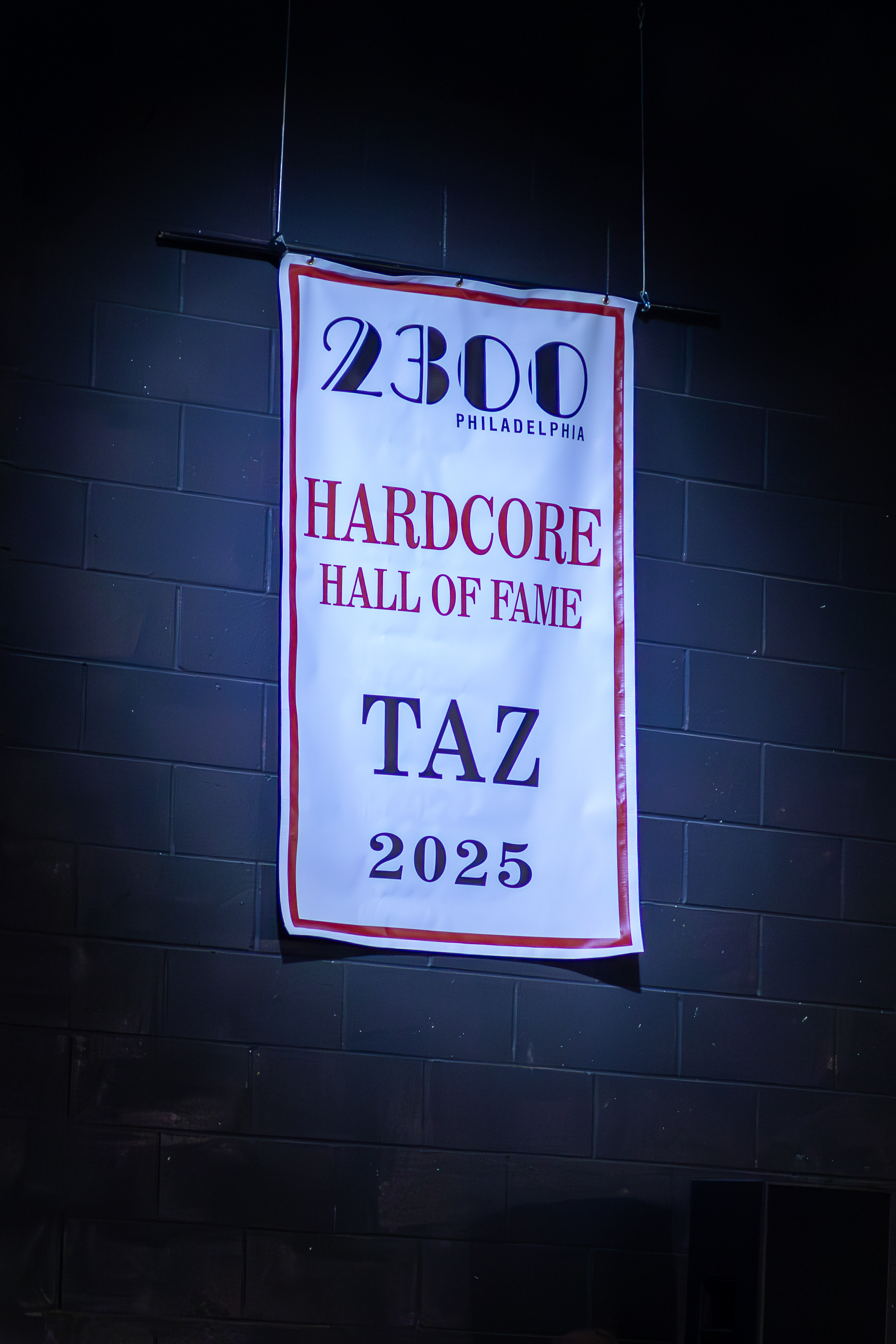
Taz

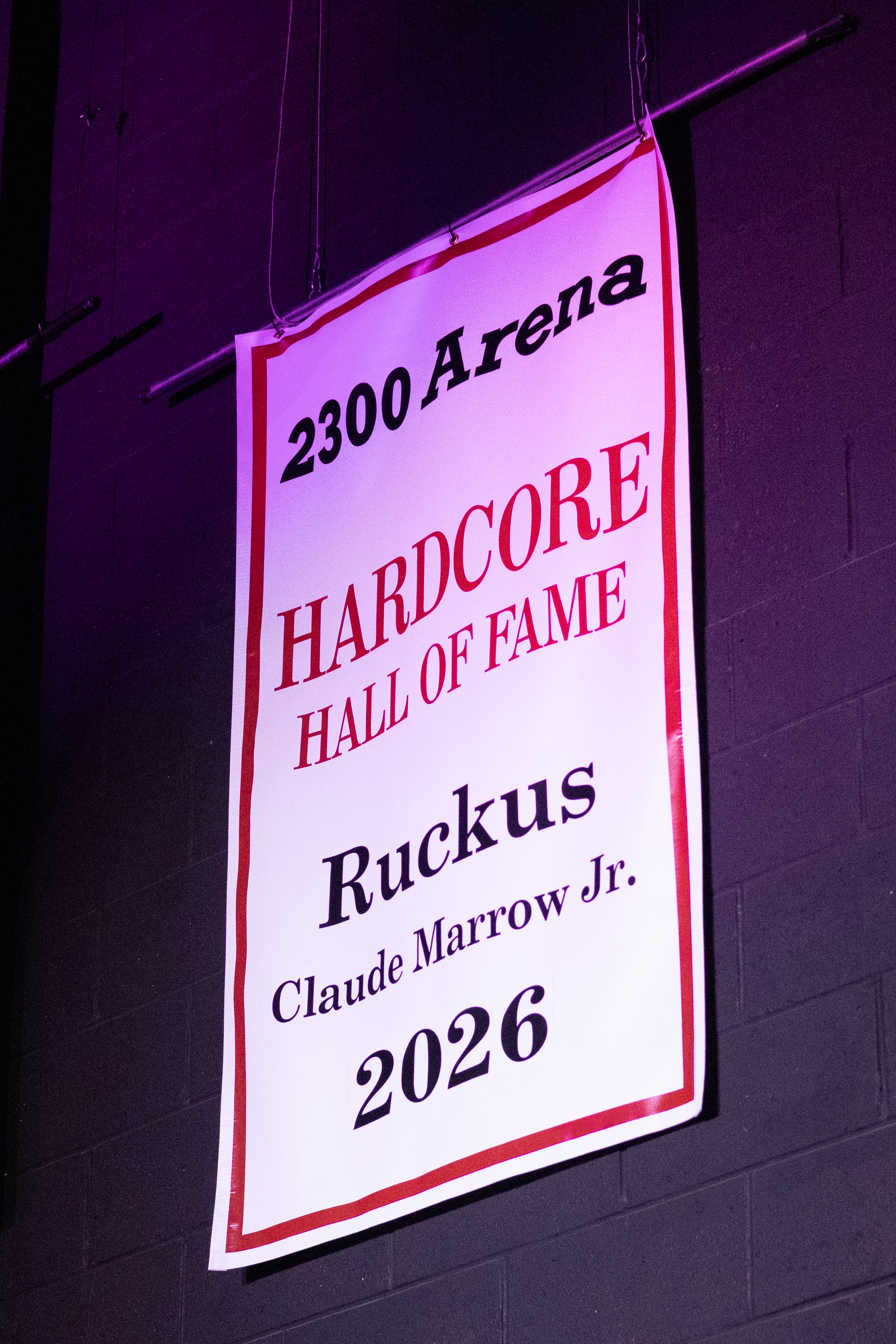
Ruckus
