= Tod Gordon =

American businessman

Personal information
- Born: June 19, 1955 (age 71) Philadelphia, Pennsylvania, U.S.

Professional wrestling career

Tod Gordon (born June 19, 1955, in Philadelphia, Pennsylvania) is an American businessman. Gordon is the president of Carver W. Reed Co. Inc, a Philadelphia jewelry store and loan office that was established in 1860. He is also the founder of defunct professional wrestling promotion Eastern Championship Wrestling (later Extreme Championship Wrestling). He owned the promotion until it was sold to his head booker Paul Heyman in May 1995.

== Extreme Championship Wrestling ==
One of Gordon's most notable involvements within ECW (Eastern Championship Wrestling at the time) was a tournament branded under the NWA name and for the NWA World Heavyweight Championship. After Shane Douglas defeated 2 Cold Scorpio to win the title, he was scripted by Gordon and Paul Heyman, who were trying to evolve into a separate company from NWA, to tell every person ever associated with the NWA to 'kiss my (Douglas') ass', throw the NWA title belt down, and personally declare himself as 'the new ECW World Heavyweight Champion'. Shortly afterward, it was confirmed that ECW was renamed to Extreme Championship Wrestling. Gordon would remain the figurehead commissioner of ECW until he left the company in May 1997 amid controversy about alleged "moles" in the ECW locker room leaking information and talent to WCW.

== Wrestling career following ECW ==
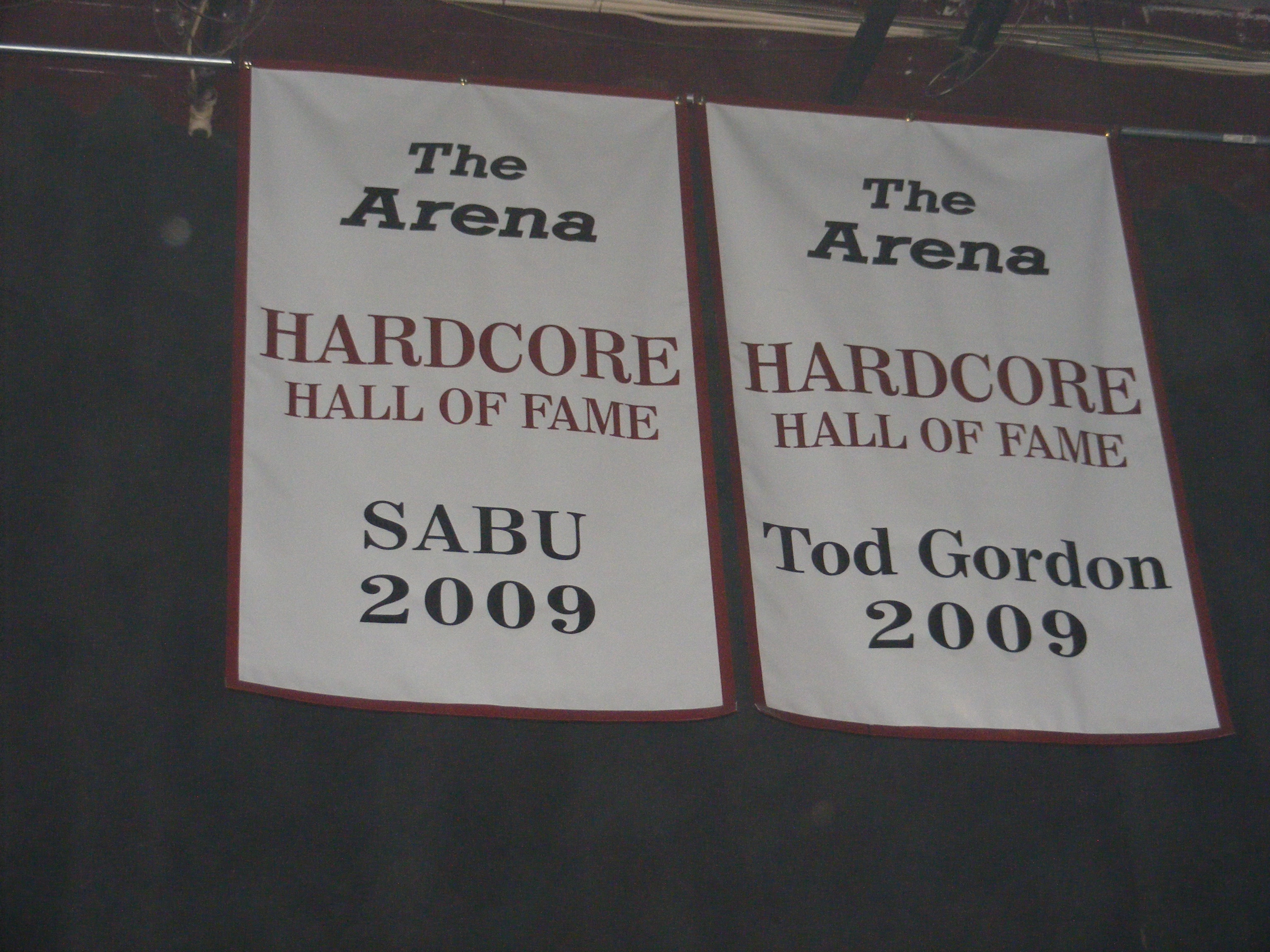
Gordon's Hardcore Hall of Fame banner in the former ECW Arena.

After ECW, Gordon booked Pro-Pain Pro Wrestling and founded Xtreme Fight Club. Gordon was involved with Pro Wrestling Unplugged and on their September 20, 2006, second anniversary event, Gordon was announced as their new owner.

On April 19, 2008, Pro Wrestling Unplugged held a farewell show for Tod Gordon.

On February 10, 2010, Tod Gordon announced that he and Paul Heyman would be collaborating on a new project, with an announcement coming in 2011. This ultimately never came to pass, with Heyman signing with WWE in 2012.

Tod Gordon returned to The Arena on July 10, 2010, to be a part of Acid-Fest as a tribute to Trent Acid.

On August 8, 2010, Gordon returned via satellite, to pay tribute to ECW on TNA's Hardcore Justice.

Gordon would appear on a WWE produced DVD documentary of Paul Heyman.

== Personal life ==
Gordon has two daughters and a son, Alexandra, Rebecca, and Charlie Gordon. Tod has been married twice. He is currently married. He owns the Philadelphia pawnbroker shop Carver W. Reed. He is a past president of the Pennsylvania State Pawnbroker's Association. He is also a past President of The Variety Club, an international charity serving children with disabilities.

== Accomplishments ==
- Hardcore Hall of Fame
  - Class of 2009
