= Requiem for a Pitbull =

1996 Extreme Championship Wrestling supercard event

- Promotion: Extreme Championship Wrestling
- Date: August 23, 1996
- City: Reading, Pennsylvania, U.S.
- Venue: Bodyslams Arena
- Attendance: c. 500

Event chronology
← Previous; ECW vs. IWA vs. True FMW: Total War	Next → Natural Born Killaz

Requiem for a Pitbull was a professional wrestling live event produced by Extreme Championship Wrestling (ECW) on August 23, 1996. The event was held in the Bodyslams Arena in Reading, Pennsylvania in the United States. A "fan cam" recording of the event was released on DVD. Requiem for a Pitbull was held to raise money for ECW wrestler Gary "Pitbull #1" Wolfe, who had suffered a cervical fracture of the spine on July 13, 1996 at Heat Wave.

== Event ==
Requiem for a Pitbull was attended by approximately 500 people. The referees for the event were Jim Molineaux, John Finnegan, and John Moore.

The event began with "troubleshooting referee" Bill Alfonso coming to the ring and stating that Shane Douglas - Pitbull #1's rival - had paid him $1,000 to stop the show. After Alfonso attempted to stop the show, ECW commissioner Tod Gordon attacked him, with multiple wrestlers coming to the ring to separate them. This drew out Taz, who German suplexed multiple wrestlers before applying the Tazmission to Gordon until being attacked by the Sandman. The Sandman and Taz then brawled until they were separated.

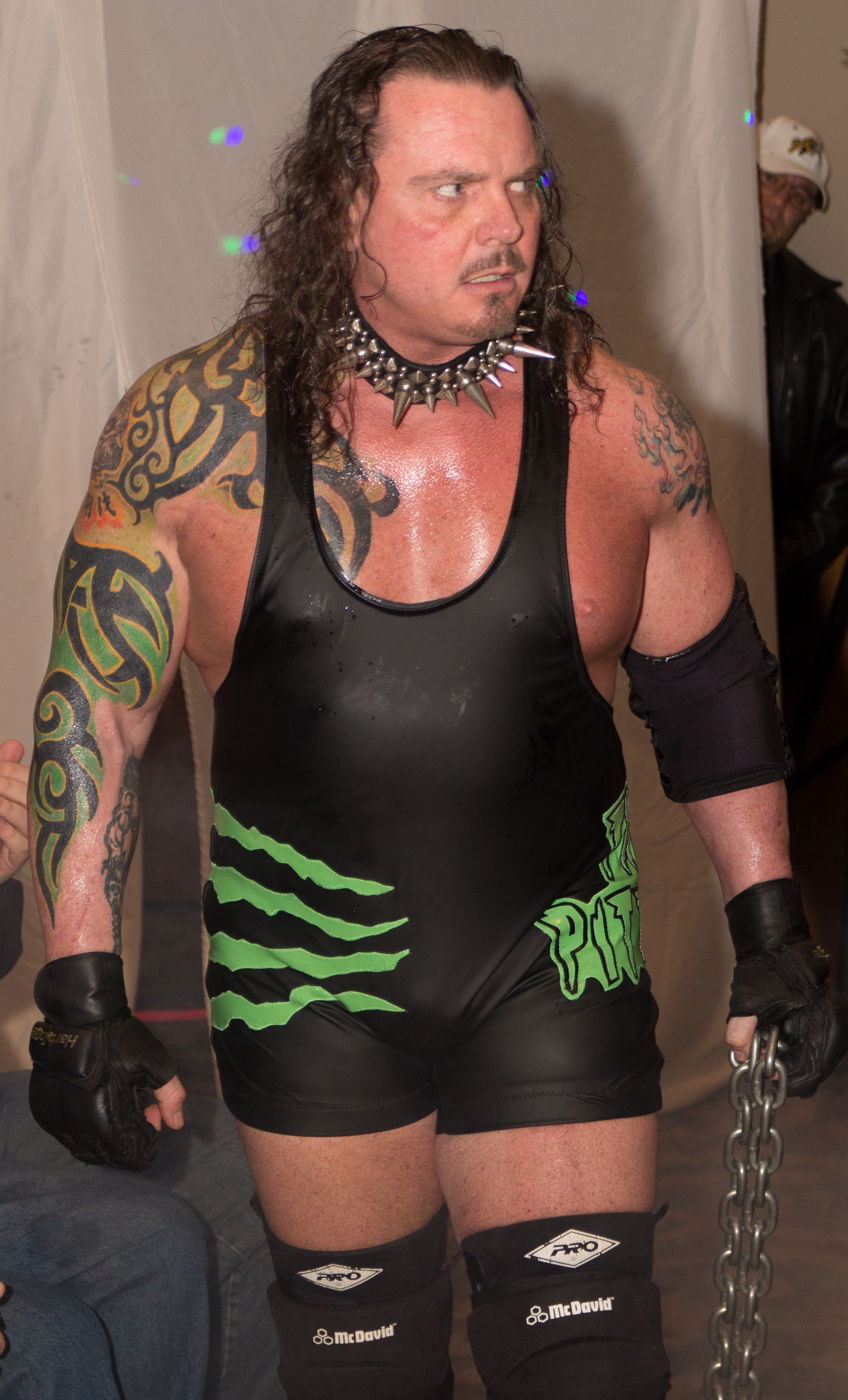
Requiem for a Pitbull was held in support of ECW wrestler Gary "Pitbull #1" Wolfe, who suffered a cervical fracture of his spine the month before.

Before the opening match, the Blue Meanie, Stevie Richards, and Super Nova (the future Blue World Order) came to the ring dressed as The Jackson 5 and danced to ABC and Billie Jean until being attacked by The Sandman. This drew out The Sandman's rival Raven, which in turn drew out the men's valets, Missy Hyatt and Lori Fullington. This led to an intergender tag team match pitting Fullington and Raven against Hyatt and the Sandman. Before the match began, Damien Kane and Lady Alexandra came to the ring and stated that they should be included in the match, only to be driven off by Hyatt and the Sandman. Hyatt and the Sandman went on to win a very short match, with the Sandman pinning Raven following a DDT.

The second bout was a singles match between Hack Meyers and Super Nova. Meyers won by pinfall following a modified diving facebuster.

The third bout saw European Junior Heavyweight Champion Mikey Whipwreck defend his title against Little Guido. Whipwreck won the bout by pinfall following a FrankenMikey and a diving bulldog.

The fourth bout was a singles match between Buh Buh Ray Dudley and Louie Spicolli. During the match, Axl Rotten and D-Von Dudley came to ringside and attacked Sign Guy Dudley, drawing out Buh Buh Ray Dudley who they also attacked. Spicolli then pinned Buh Buh Ray Dudley using a small package. Following the match, D-Von Dudley, Rotten, and Spicolli attacked Buh Buh Ray Dudley until Sign Guy Dudley went backstage and returned with Big Dick Dudley. After Big Dick Dudley chokeslammed Rotten and Spicolli, D-Von Dudley fled.

The fifth bout saw ECW World Tag Team Champions the Gangstas defend their titles against the Samoan Gangsta Party. The Gangstas won by pinfall following a running powerslam by Mustafa and a 187 by New Jack.

The sixth bout was a tag team match pitting the Eliminators against Terry Gordy and Tommy Dreamer. Dreamer and Gordy won the bout when Dreamer pinned Perry Saturn following a DDT.

The seventh bout was a singles match between Brian Lee and Pablo Márquez. Lee won a short squash by pinfall following a Prime Time Slam. After the match, Lee gave Márquez a second Prime Time Slam through a table at ringside.

The main event was a singles match between Rob Van Dam and Tommy Dreamer. After Shane Douglas interfered in the match, hitting Dreamer with his ECW World Television Championship, Van Dam gave Dreamer a spin kick and then pinned him.

Following the match, Pitbull #1 gave a short speech thanking the audience for attending.

== Results ==
No.	Results	Stipulations
1	Missy Hyatt and The Sandman defeated Lori Fullington and Raven (with the Blue Meanie, Stevie Richards, Super Nova, and Tyler Fullington) by pinfall	Intergender tag team match
2	Hack Meyers defeated Super Nova (with the Blue Meanie and Stevie Richards) by pinfall	Singles match
3	Mikey Whipwreck (c) defeated Little Guido (with J.T. Smith and Sal Bellomo) by pinfall	Singles match for the European Junior Heavyweight Championship
4	Louie Spicolli defeated Buh Buh Ray Dudley (with Sign Guy Dudley) by pinfall	Singles match
5	The Gangstas (Mustafa and New Jack) (c) defeated the Samoan Gangsta Party (Big Matty Smalls and Sammy the Silk) by pinfall	Tag team match for the ECW World Tag Team Championship
6	Terry Gordy and Tommy Dreamer (with Beulah McGillicutty) defeated the Eliminators (Kronus and Saturn) by pinfall	Tag team match
7	Brian Lee defeated Pablo Márquez by pinfall	Singles match
8	Rob Van Dam defeated Tommy Dreamer (with Beulah McGillicutty and Pitbull #1) by pinfall	Singles match
(c) / – the champion(s) heading into the match
