= ECW Natural Born Killaz =

1996 Extreme Championship Wrestling live event

Natural Born Killaz
- The ECW Arena
- Promotion: Extreme Championship Wrestling
- Date: August 24, 1996 (aired August 27, September 3, and September 10, 1996)
- City: Philadelphia, Pennsylvania, US
- Venue: ECW Arena
- Attendance: c.1,400

Event chronology
← Previous; Requiem for a Pitbull	Next → Unlucky Lottery

Natural Born Killaz was a professional wrestling live event produced by Extreme Championship Wrestling (ECW) on August 24, 1996. The event was held in the ECW Arena in Philadelphia, Pennsylvania in the United States. Excerpts from Natural Born Killaz aired on episodes #175, #176, and #177 of the syndicated television show ECW Hardcore TV, while the event was released on VHS in 1996 and on DVD in 2001. It was made available for streaming on the WWE Network in 2020. The main event was featured on the 2001 compilation DVD ECW - Hardcore History and the 2007 compilation DVD ECW - Extreme Rules.

The title of Natural Born Killaz referred to the 1994 single Natural Born Killaz by Dr. Dre and Ice Cube. The Gangstas, who performed in the main event, used Natural Born Killaz as their entrance music.

== Event ==
The commentator for Natural Born Killaz was Joey Styles. The ring announcer was Joel Gertner. The referees were Jim Molineaux, John Finnegan, and John Moore. The event was attended by approximately 1,400 people.

The opening bout was a singles match between Louie Spicolli and Devon Storm. Before the match began, Taz entered the commentary booth and commandeered a video camera to deliver a fiery promo in which he challenged his rival Sabu. Spicolli went on to defeat Storm by pinfall following a Death Valley Driver. Following the match, Storm's manager Damien Kane fired Storm and then attempted to convince Spicolli to join his stable, only for Spicolli to refuse and give him three Death Valley Drivers.

In the second bout, Mikey Whipwreck defended the EWA European Junior Heavyweight Championship against Little Guido. Despite attempted interference from the other members of the Full Blooded Italians, Whipwreck defeated Little Guido by pinfall following a diving elbow drop. During the match, Whipwreck suffered a knee injury while performing a FrankenMikey.

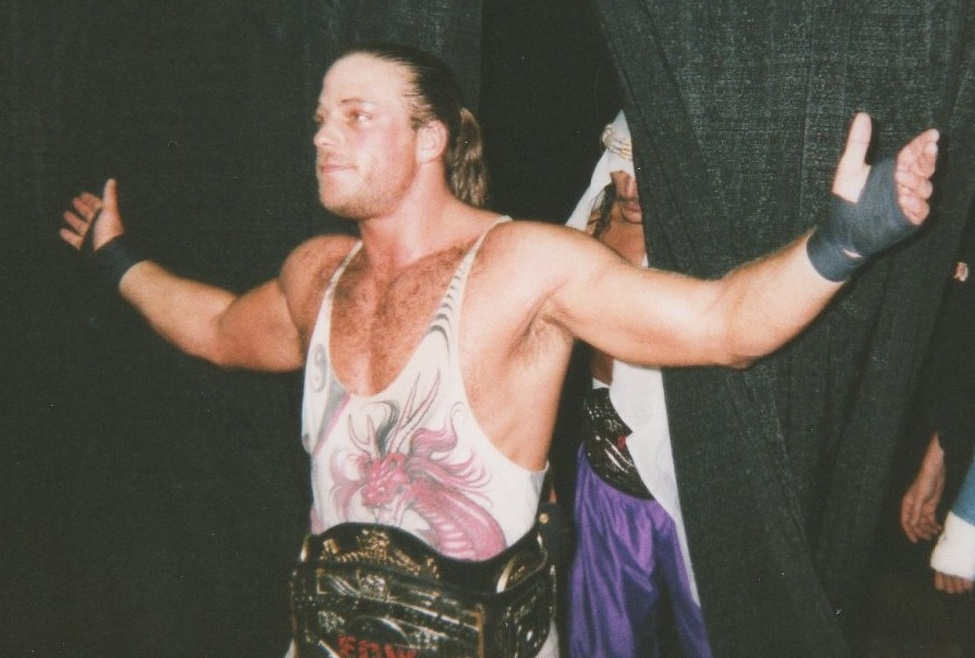
Rob Van Dam defeated Doug Furnas at Natural Born Killaz.

The third bout was a tag team match pitting Axl Rotten and D-Von Dudley against Big Dick Dudley and Buh Buh Ray Dudley. The match ended when Buh Buh Ray Dudley pinned Rotten with a big splash.

The fourth bout was scheduled to be "Catfight '96" between Lori Fullington and Missy Hyatt, but Hyatt was announced as being unable to compete due to injury (she had broken her elbow at an ECW event earlier that month). After announcer Joel Gertner insulted Hyatt, Hyatt and the Sandman beat him down using the Sandman's Singapore cane. Stevie Richards - who had announced at Big Apple Extreme Blast that he was suing Hyatt for sexual harassment due to her kissing him at Holiday Hell - then offered to drop the lawsuit if Hyatt denounced the Sandman. Hyatt agreed and insulted the Sandman, leading him to cane her in the back of the head as she turned to leave. This marked Hyatt's final appearance with ECW.

In a match that was not broadcast, Lori Fullington faced Lady Alexandra, who was substituting for Hyatt. Fullington defeated Alexandra by pinfall in a very short match when Stevie Richards hit Alexandra with a loaded boot.

The fifth match was a "no rules Badstreet match" between Brian Lee and Terry Gordy. During the match, the two men brawled outside of the ECW Arena. Gordy won the bout by pinfall using the Asiatic Spike.

The sixth bout was a singles match between Rob Van Dam and a mystery opponent, who was revealed to be the debuting Doug Furnas. Van Dam won the match by pinfall following a Van Daminator. Following the match, Van Dam offered Furnas a handshake in an uncharacteristic show of respect, only for Furnas to lariat him and then give him a belly-to-back suplex, resulting in Van Dam being stretchered out of the ring.

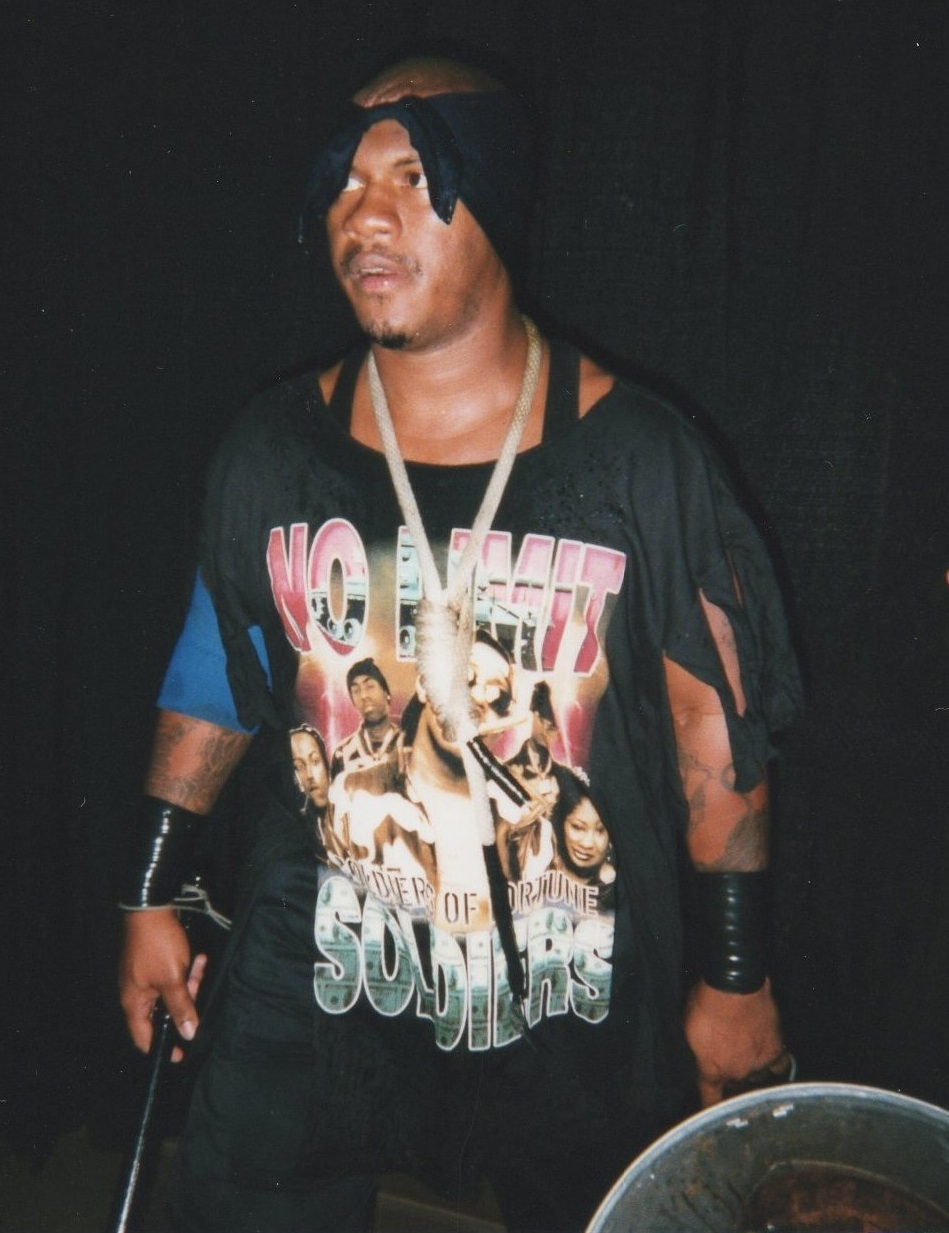
New Jack, one-half of The Gangstas, wrestled in the main event of Natural Born Killaz.

The seventh bout was a singles match between Taz and Tommy Dreamer. Towards the end of the match, Taz knocked the referee unconscious as he attempted to prevent Taz from giving Dreamer a chair shot. Shortly thereafter, Taz applied his Tazmission hold to Dreamer with the referee still unconscious. After Dreamer's valet Beulah McGillicutty entered the ring to plead for Taz to release the hold, Taz's manager Bill Alfonso entered the ring and threatened McGillicutty. This drew out Terry Gordy to protect McGillicutty, which in turn drew out the Eliminators, who performed Total Elimination on Gordy, and Brian Lee, who performed the Asiatic Spike on Gordy. The undercard wrestlers El Puerto Riqueño, Don E. Allen, the Bad Crew, Buh Buh Ray Dudley, Sign Guy Dudley, and Hack Meyers all came to the ring in turn to try and intervene, but were variously beaten down by the Eliminators, Lee, and Taz. The match itself was ultimately ruled a no contest.

The eighth bout was a tag team dog collar match pitting Pitbull #2 and the Sandman against Raven (the then-ECW World Heavyweight Champion) and Shane Douglas. The match began with the Sandman wrestling on his own due to Pitbull #2 having been injured prior to the match by Douglas. After several minutes, Pitbull #2 joined the match wearing a neck brace. The match ended when Pitbull #2 pinned Raven after hitting him with a loaded boot, with Douglas abandoning Raven instead of breaking the pinfall. Following the match, the Sandman attempted to cane Raven, only for Raven to pull the Sandman's young son Tyler - who he had indoctrinated - in front of him. The Sandman knelt down and tried to convince Tyler to leave Raven, but instead Tyler took the Sandman's Singapore cane and struck him with it twice. Raven then used the distraction to attack the Sandman before fleeing.

The main event saw ECW World Tag Team Champions the Gangstas defend their titles against the Eliminators in a steel cage weapons match. During the match, the Eliminators received assistance from a disguised Shane Douglas, who hit New Jack with a guitar as he attempted to retrieve a weapon. Towards the end of the match, Perry Saturn - who had executed multiple moves from the top of the cage - climbed to the top of the cage a final time, only for New Jack to hurl a trash can at him, knocking him off the cage and through a table. The Gangstas went on to win the bout after Mustafa gave John Kronus a running powerslam, then New Jack gave him a 187 and pinned him to retain the titles. Following the match, the Eliminators argued until Douglas calmed them down, then gave the Triple Threat hand signal.

== Results ==
No.	Results	Stipulations	Times
1	Louie Spicolli defeated Devon Storm (with Damien Kane and Lady Alexandra) by pinfall	Singles match	5:22
2	Mikey Whipwreck (c) defeated Little Guido (with Big Guido, J.T. Smith, and Sal Bellomo) by pinfall	Singles match for the EWA European Junior Heavyweight Championship	8:57
3	The Dudley Brothers (Big Dick Dudley and Buh Buh Ray Dudley) (with Chubby Dudley and Sign Guy Dudley) defeated Axl Rotten and D-Von Dudley by pinfall	Tag team match	8:54
4	Lori Fullington (with Stevie Richards) defeated Lady Alexandra (with Damien Kane) by pinfall	Singles match	—
5	Terry Gordy defeated Brian Lee by pinfall	"No rules Badstreet match”	5:12
6	Rob Van Dam defeated Doug Furnas by pinfall	Singles match	13:07
7	Taz (with Bill Alfonso and Team Taz) vs. Tommy Dreamer (with Beulah McGillicutty) ended in a no contest	Singles match	12:36
8	Pitbull #2 and the Sandman defeated Raven (with the Blue Meanie, Lori Fullington, Stevie Richards, Super Nova, and Tyler Fullington) and Shane Douglas (with Francine) by pinfall	Tag team dog collar match	15:22
9	The Gangstas (Mustafa and New Jack) (c) defeated the Eliminators (Kronus and Saturn) by pinfall	Steel cage weapons match for the ECW World Tag Team Championship	15:03
(c) / – the champion(s) heading into the match
