= ECW The Doctor Is In =

1996 Extreme Championship Wrestling live event

The Doctor Is In
- The ECW Arena
- Promotion: Extreme Championship Wrestling
- Date: August 3, 1996 (aired August 6 and 20, 1996)
- City: Philadelphia, Pennsylvania, U.S.
- Venue: ECW Arena
- Attendance: c. 1,400

Event chronology
← Previous; Heat Wave	Next → ECW vs. IWA vs. True FMW: Total War

The Doctor Is In was a professional wrestling live event produced by Extreme Championship Wrestling (ECW) on August 3, 1996. The event was held in the ECW Arena in Philadelphia, Pennsylvania in the United States. The title of the event referred to the debuting "Dr. Death" Steve Williams.

Excerpts from The Doctor Is In aired on episodes #172 and #174 of the syndicated television show ECW Hardcore TV on August 6 and 20, 1996, while the full event was released on VHS in 1996. It was made available for streaming on the WWE Network in 2020. The main event (a stretcher match between Rob Van Dam and Sabu) was included on the 2001 Pioneer Entertainment compilation DVD Hardcore History and the compilation DVD Bloodsport: ECW's Most Violent Matches released by WWE in 2006, while the bout between Pitbull #2 and Shane Douglas was also featured on Hardcore History and the bout between 2 Cold Scorpio and Chris Jericho was included on the compilation DVD ECW Unreleased, Vol. 1 released by WWE in 2012.

== Event ==
The commentator for the event was Joey Styles. The ring announcer was Bob Artese, with Joel Gertner acting as guest ring announcer for Shane Douglas.

The event began with J.T. Smith - who often sang at ECW events - coming to the ring. Smith announced that, instead of singing himself, Kiss would perform. Stevie Richards, the Blue Meanie, Super Nova, and Don E. Allen then came to the ring dressed as Kiss members Paul Stanley, Gene Simmons, Ace Frehley, and Peter Criss respectively, complete with musical instruments. They then lip synched and mimed to the Kiss song "Rock and Roll All Nite" until the Sandman came to the ring and caned them. The Sandman's rival Raven - who had a broken foot - then came to the ring and distracted the Sandman, enabling Stevie Richards to regroup and give him a Stevie Kick. Raven then took the Sandman's Singapore cane and struck him in the eye with it.

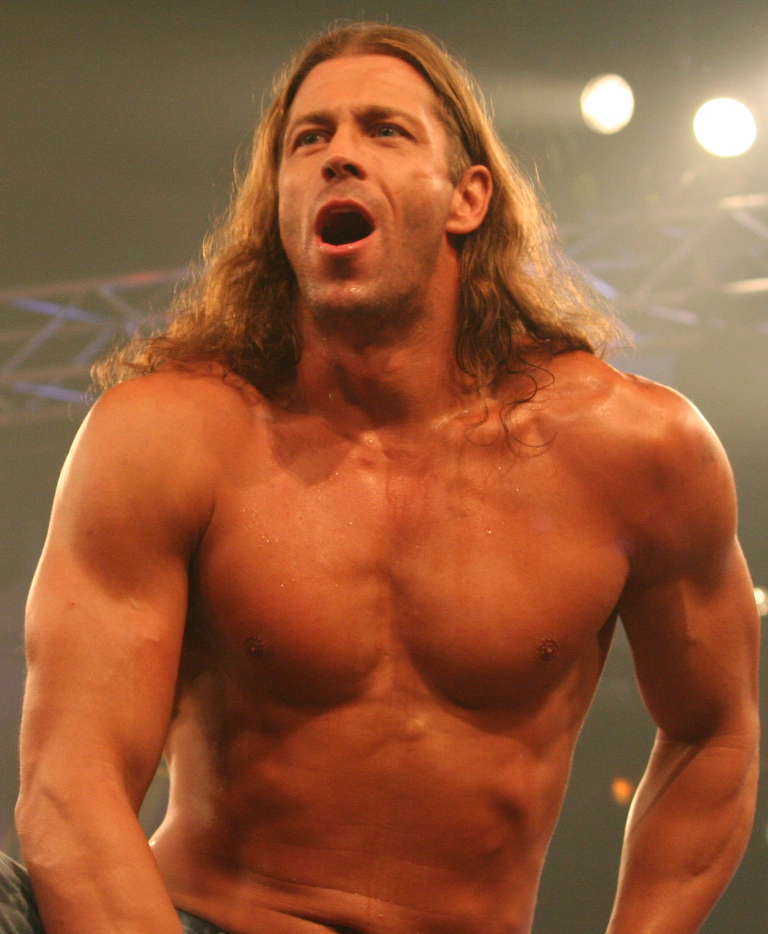
Stevie Richards successfully defended the ECW World Heavyweight Champion on behalf of Raven at The Doctor Is In.

The opening match saw Mikey Whipwreck face Devon Storm. Whipwreck had recently won the European Wrestling Association's European Junior Heavyweight Championship and wore the title to the ring. The matched when Whipwreck pinned Storm with a FrankenMikey after interference from Storm's manager Damien Kane backfired.

The second bout was a singles match between Johnny Smith and Louie Spicolli, both of whom had recently debuted in ECW. Smith won a fast-paced technical bout by pinfall following a tiger driver. After the match, the audience gave both men a standing ovation.

The third bout was a singles match between Axl Rotten and D-Von Dudley. The match was never started after the Dudley Brothers interfered, leading Axl Rotten and D-Von Dudley to join forces against them.

The fourth match was scheduled to be ECW World Heavyweight Champion Raven defending his title against the Sandman. After Raven announced that he could not wrestle due to a broken foot, ECW Commissioner Tod Gordon announced that Raven's lackey Stevie Richards had volunteered to defend the championship on his behalf, angering Raven who have a DDT to Richards before the match commenced. After repeated interference from Raven's Nest (including the Sandman's estranged wife Lori and son Tyler, who had become followers of Raven), some of which backfired on Richards, Richards was able to hit the Sandman in the back of the head with a loaded boot. Raven then pushed Richards out of the way and pinned the Sandman himself. During the match, Lori hit the Sandman's manager Missy Hyatt with her boot and knocked out Hyatt's hair extension, resulting in legitimate heat between the two women.

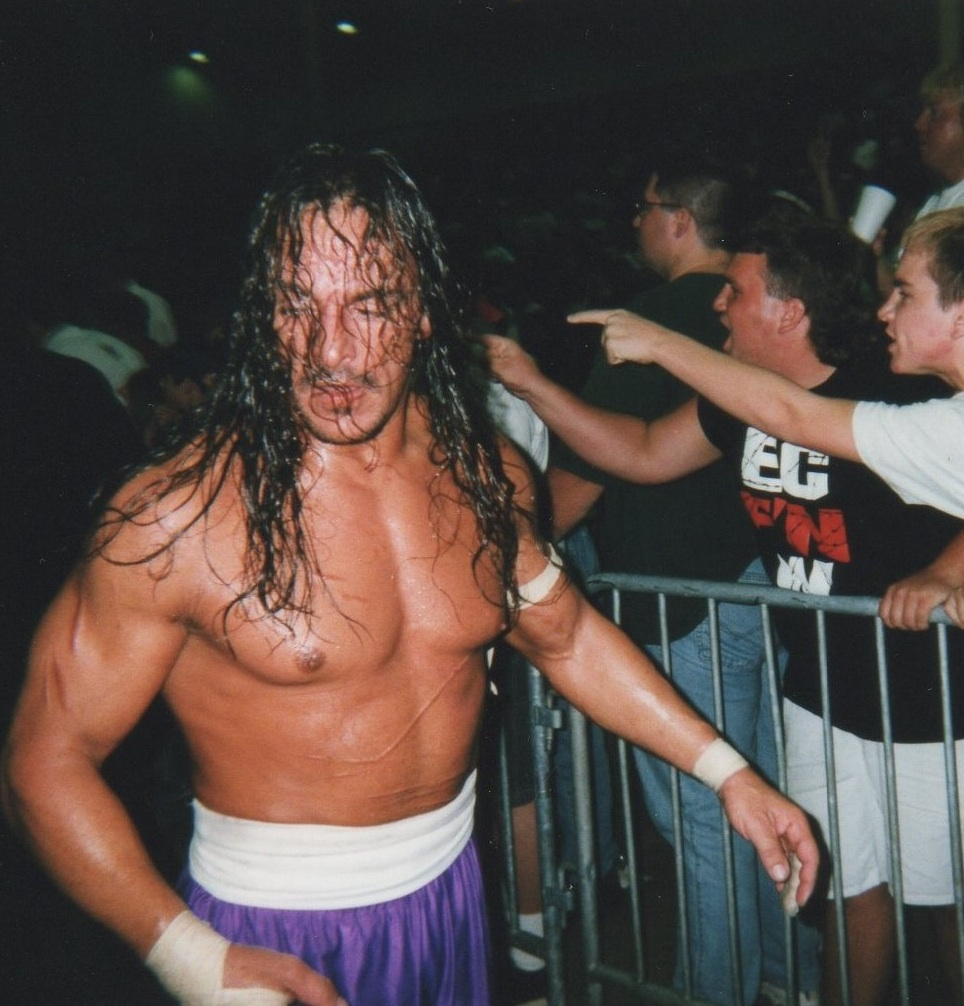
Sabu won the main event of The Doctor Is In, defeating Rob Van Dam in a stretcher match.

The fifth bout saw 2 Cold Scorpio face Chris Jericho in Jericho's final appearance with ECW before departing to join World Championship Wrestling. 2 Cold Scorpio defeated Jericho by pinfall using a shooting star press.

In the sixth bout, ECW World Television Champion Shane Douglas defended his title against Pitbull #2. Pitbull #2 was accompanied to the ring by his tag team partner, Pitbull #1, who was wearing a neck brace after suffering a cervical fracture of his spine at Heat Wave when Douglas gave him a DDT onto the ECW World Television Championship. The match saw Pitbull #2 repeatedly target Douglas' neck in an attempt to avenge Pitbull #1. The match ended when a heavily bleeding Pitbull #2 attempted to give Douglas a Superbomb but was unable to deliver the move due to weakness from blood loss, enabling Douglas to counter and give him two belly-to-belly suplexes for a pinfall victory.

The seventh bout was a "dream partners" tag team match between rivals Brian Lee and Tommy Dreamer, with Lee choosing Taz as his partner and Dreamer choosing the debuting "Dr. Death" Steve Williams. The match ended when Lee pinned Dreamer following a Prime Time Slam onto a trash can. During the match, Dreamer's valet Beulah McGillicutty brawled with Taz's manager Bill Alfonso, suffering a broken wrist in the process.

The penultimate match was a four-way tag team elimination match for the ECW World Tag Team Championship, with the Eliminators defending against the Bruise Brothers, the Gangstas, and the Samoan Gangsta Party. The Samoan Gangsta Party were the first team eliminated after New Jack performed a 187 on Sammy Silk and pinned him. The Bruise Brothers were the second team eliminated after the Eliminators performed Total Elimination on one of the Brothers and pinned him. The Gangstas won the match by pinfall after another 187 from New Jack to John Kronus, thus becoming the new ECW World Tag Team Champions.

The main event was a stretcher match between Rob Van Dam and Sabu in a continuation of their rivalry that had begun at Hostile City Showdown. Sabu won the match after Van Dam attempted a somersault plancha on Sabu while he lay on the stretcher outside of the ring, only for Sabu to roll out of the way, resulting in Van Dam knocking himself unconscious atop the stretcher.

== Results ==
No.	Results	Stipulations	Times
1	Mikey Whipwreck defeated Devon Storm (with Damien Kane and Lady Alexandra by pinfall	Singles match	12:25
2	Johnny Smith defeated Louie Spicolli by pinfall	Singles match	5:39
3	Axl Rotten vs. D-Von Dudley ended in a no contest	Singles match	—
4	Stevie Richards (with The Blue Meanie, Don E. Allen, Lori Fullington, Raven, Super Nova, and Tyler Fullington) defeated the Sandman (with Missy Hyatt) by pinfall	Singles match for Raven's ECW World Heavyweight Championship	7:12
5	2 Cold Scorpio defeated Chris Jericho by pinfall	Singles match	19:56
6	Shane Douglas (with Francine) (c) defeated Pitbull #2 (with Pitbull #1) by pinfall	Singles match for the ECW World Television Championship	15:26
7	Brian Lee and Taz (with Bill Alfonso and Team Taz) defeated Steve Williams and Tommy Dreamer (with Beulah McGillicutty) by pinfall	Tag team match	6:57
8	The Gangstas (Mustafa and New Jack) defeated the Bruise Brothers (Don Bruise and Ron Bruise), the Eliminators (Kronus and Saturn) (c), and the Samoan Gangsta Party (Mack Daddy Kane and Sammy Silk) by pinfall	Four-way tag team elimination match for the ECW World Tag Team Championship	11:01
9	Sabu defeated Rob Van Dam	Stretcher match	23:22
(c) / – the champion(s) heading into the match
