= ECW vs. IWA vs. True FMW: Total War =

Professional wrestling event

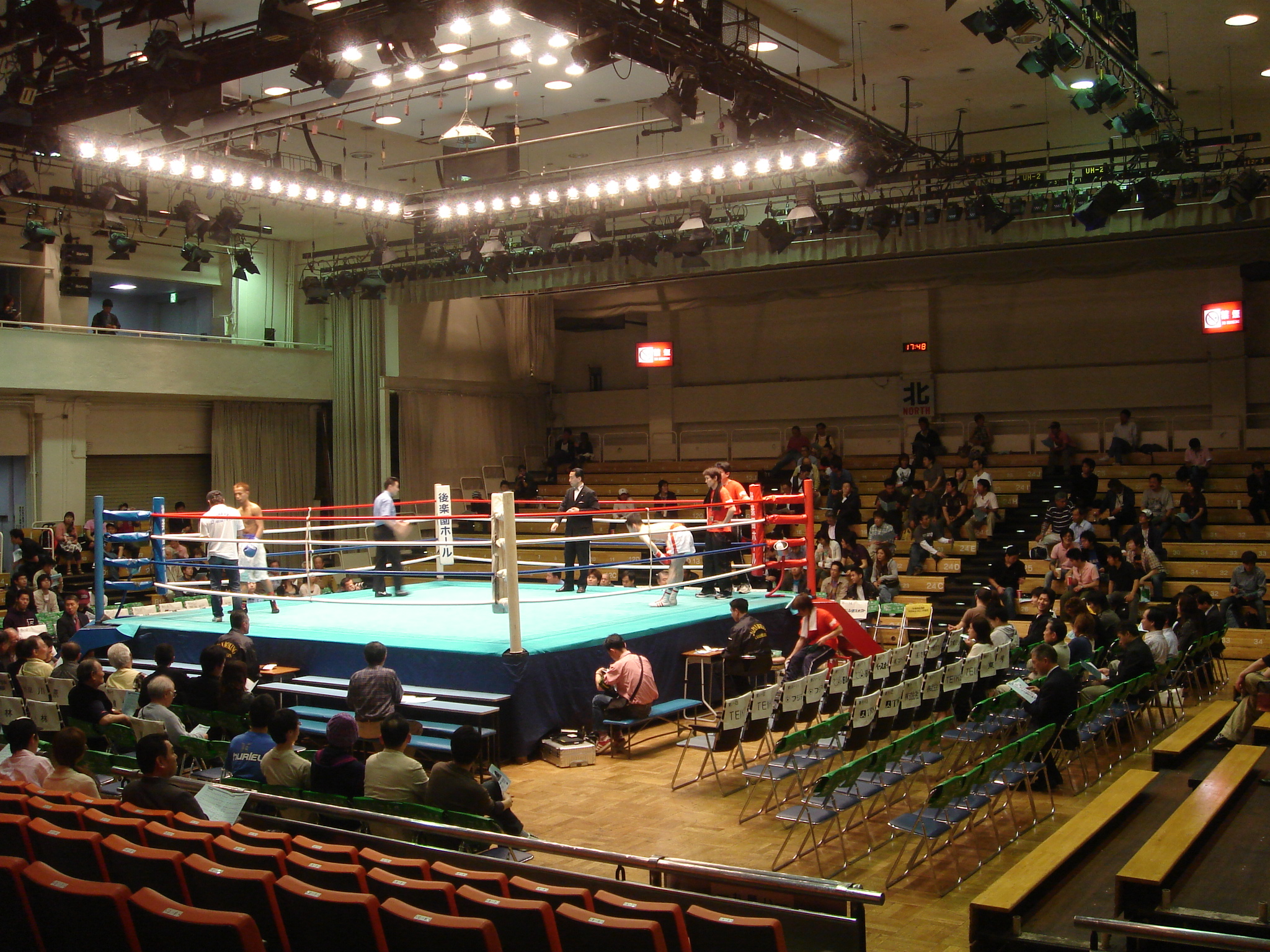
- Korakuen Hall, the venue for the second day of ECW vs. IWA vs. True FMW: Total War.
- Promotion(s): Extreme Championship Wrestling; International Wrestling Association of Japan
- Date: August 10, 1996; August 11, 1996 (aired August 13, 1996)
- City: Yokohama, Kanagawa, Japan (August 10, 1996); Tokyo, Japan (August 11, 1996)
- Venue: Yokohama Cultural Gymnasium (August 10, 1996); Korakuen Hall (August 11, 1996)
- Attendance: 1,700 (August 10, 1996); 2,000 (August 11, 1996)

Event chronology
← Previous; The Doctor Is In	Next → Requiem for a Pitbull

In professional wrestling, ECW vs. IWA vs. True FMW: Total War (also translated as All Out War) was an event staged in Japan by the International Wrestling Association of Japan (IWA Japan) in conjunction with the United States–based professional wrestling promotion Extreme Championship Wrestling (ECW) on August 10 and 11, 1996. The event took place over two days, with the first day's event taking place in the Yokohama Cultural Gymnasium, Yokohama on August 10 and the second in Korakuen Hall, Tokyo on August 11. It formed part of IWA Japan's August 1996 "Danger & Pleasure" tour.

Highlights from the event aired on episode #173 of the syndicated television show ECW Hardcore TV on August 13, 1996. Several bouts from the event were released on DVD by RF Video as ECW vs IWA Japan and by Wrestling Epicenter as ECW Doing it in Japan. The bout between Raven and Tommy Dreamer was included on the DVD and Blu-ray ECW Unreleased Vol. 3 released by WWE in 2015.

== Background ==
The event was presented as a three-way conflict between ECW, IWA Japan, and "True FMW" (the stable of Tarzan Goto, Flying Kid Ichihara and Mr. Gannosuke (the latter of whom did not participate in the event) – also known as "Shin FMW" – who had joined IWA Japan from the rival Frontier Martial-Arts Wrestling promotion).

The event marked ECW's first foray into Japan. It was the culmination of a working agreement between ECW and IWA Japan that saw IWA World Heavyweight Champion Tarzan Goto travel to the United States in July 1996 to wrestle at the ECW supercard Heat Wave.

== August 10, 1996 ==
=== Event ===
The first show of the event was held on August 10, 1996 in the Yokohama Cultural Gymnasium in Yokohama, Japan. It was attended by approximately 1,700 people.

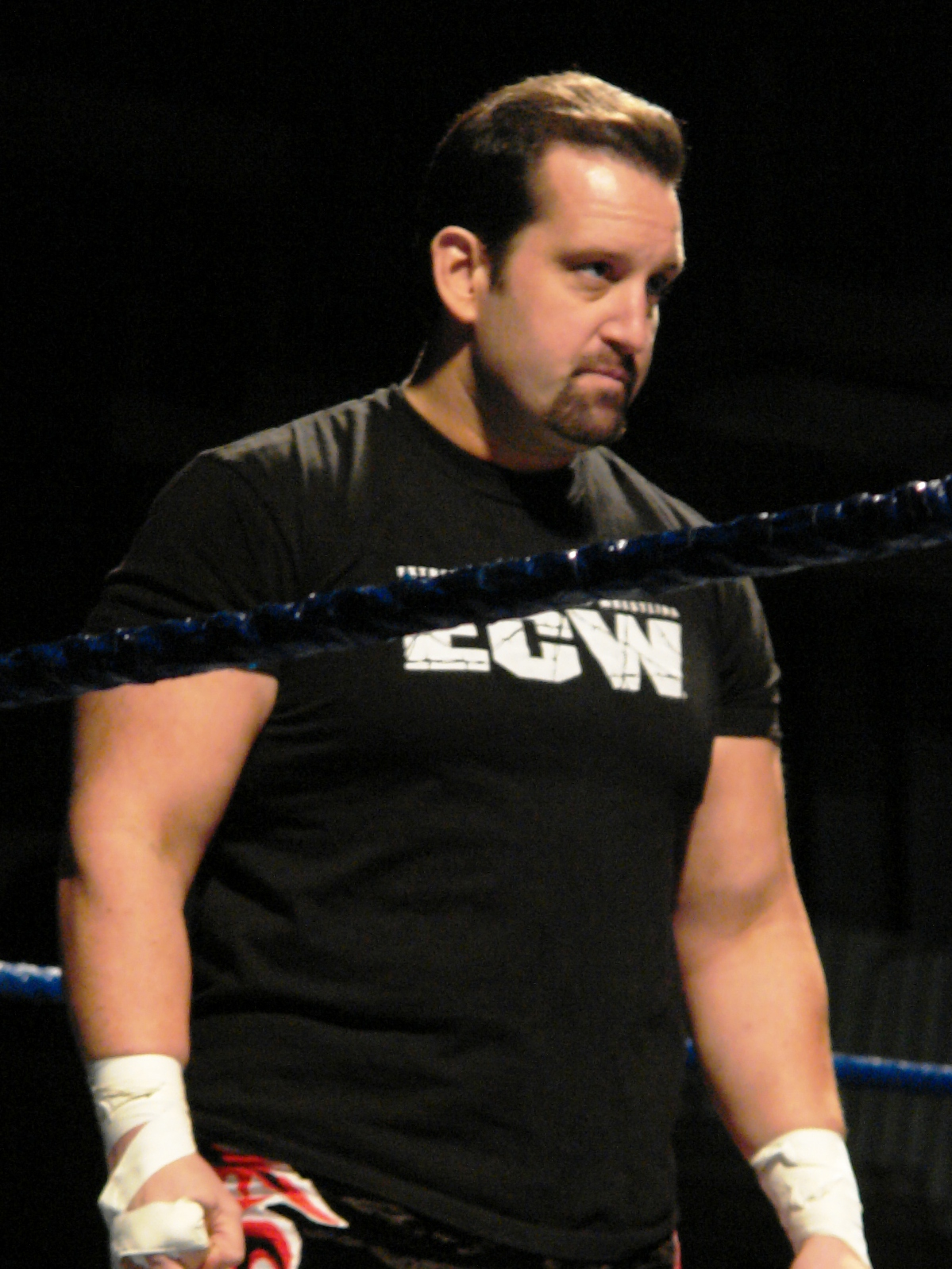
Tommy Dreamer and his tag team partner Terry Gordy won the main event of the August 10, 1996 show.

The opening bout was a singles match between the IWA Japan wrestlers Felinito and Orito. The match was won by Ortio, who pinned Felinito with a huracánrana.

The second bout was a singles match featuring IWA Japan wrestlers Emi Motokawa and Kiyoko Ichiki. The match was won by Ichiki, who forced Motokawa to submit using a cross kneelock.

The third bout was a tag team match featuring IWA Japan wrestlers, with Keizo Matsuda and Tortuga defeating Jun Nagaoka and Takeshi Sato, with Matsuda pinning Nagaoka following a guillotine leg drop.

The fourth bout was a tag team match featuring IWA Japan wrestlers, with Keisuke Yamada and Takashi Okano defeating Flying Kid Ichihara (a member of Shin FMW) and Ryo Miyake when Yamada pinned Miyake with a diving crossbody.

The fifth bout was an inter-promotional singles match pitting the ECW wrestlers Buh Buh Ray Dudley against the IWA Japan wrestler Katsumi Hirano. The match was won by Dudley, who pinned Hirano following a Buh Buh Bomb.

The sixth bout was a tag team match featuring IWA Japan wrestlers, with the Blackhearts defeating Hiroshi Itakura and Leatherface when Blackheart Apocalypse pinned Itakura following a guillotine leg drop.

The first of two main events was an inter-promotional handicap match pitting IWA Japan wrestler Tarzan Goto (the then-IWA World Heavyweight Champion and the leader of Shin FMW) against the ECW tag team the Eliminators. The match was won by the Eliminators, with Kronus pinning Goto using a diving crossbody.

The second of two main events was a tag team match featuring ECW wrestlers pitting Raven and Stevie Richards against Terry Gordy and Tommy Dreamer in a continuation of the lengthy feud between Raven and Dreamer. The match was won by Dreamer and Gordy, with Gordy pinning Richards following a powerbomb.

=== Results ===
No.	Results	Stipulations	Times
1	Orito defeated Felinito by pinfall	Singles match	7:43
2	Kiyoko Ichiki defeated Emi Motokawa by submission	Singles match	8:33
3	Keizo Matsuda and Tortuga defeated Jun Nagaoka and Takeshi Sato by pinfall	Tag team match	11:08
4	Keisuke Yamada and Takashi Okano defeated Flying Kid Ichihara and Ryo Miyake by pinfall	Tag team match	13:25
5	Buh Buh Ray Dudley defeated Katsumi Hirano by pinfall	Singles match	3:37
6	The Blackhearts (Blackheart Apocalypse and Blackheart Destruction) defeated Hiroshi Itakura and Leatherface by pinfall	Tag team match	9:17
7	The Eliminators (Kronus and Saturn) defeated Tarzan Goto by pinfall	Handicap match	8:53
8	Terry Gordy and Tommy Dreamer defeated Raven and Stevie Richards by pinfall	Tag team match	13:08

== August 11, 1996 ==
=== Event ===
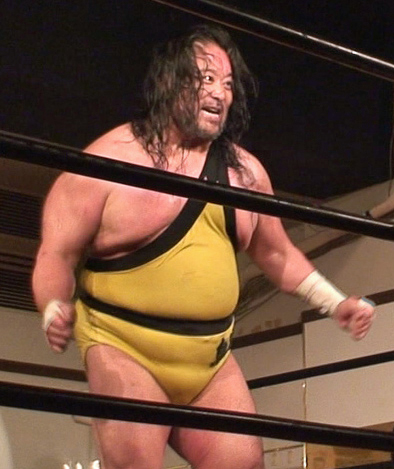
IWA World Heavyweight Champion Tarzan Goto successfully defended his title in the main event of the August 11, 1996 show.

The second and final show of the event was held on August 11, 1996, in Korakuen Hall in Tokyo, Japan. It was attended by a sell-out crowd of 2,000 people.

The opening bout was a singles match between IWA Japan wrestler Felinito and Orito in a rematch from the prior day. The match was once again won by Orito, who pinned Felintio using la magistral.

The second bout was a singles match between Emi Motokawa and Kiyoko Ichiki in another rematch from the prior day. The match was won by Motokawa, who pinned Ichiki with a diving crossbody.

The third bout was a six man tag team match featuring IWA Japan wrestlers in which Hiroshi Itakura, Katsumi Hirano, and Tortuga defeated Akinori Tsukioka, Flying Kid Ichihara (a member of Shin FMW), and Ryo Miyake.

The fourth bout was an inter-promotional singles match pitting ECW wrestler Stevie Richards against IWA Kapan wrestler Keizo Matsuda. The match was won by Richards, who pinned Matsuda following a Stevie Kick.

The fifth bout was a promotional tag team match featuring IWA Japan wrestlers pitting The Blackhearts against Leatherface and Terry Gordy. The match was won by Gordy and Leatherface, with Gordy pinning Blackheart Apocalypse following a powerbomb.

The first of three main events was an inter-promotional tag team match pitting the Eliminators against IWA Japan wrestlers Keisuke Yamada and Takashi Okano. The Eliminators defeated Okano and Yamada, with Saturn pinning Okano after The Eliminators performed Total Elimination on him.

The second of three main events featured ECW wrestlers, with ECW World Heavyweight Champion Raven defending his title against Tommy Dreamer in a continuation of their lengthy feud. Raven's ally Stevie Richards repeatedly interfered in the match, giving Dreamer several Stevie Kicks. The match ended when Raven's ally Miss Patricia attempted to interfere in the match, with Dreamer giving her a piledriver; Raven took advantage of the distraction to give Dreamer two chair shots and then pin him to retain his title.

The third of three main events was an inter-promotional match in which IWA World Heavyweight Champion Tarzan Goto (the leader of Shin FMW) defended his title against ECW wrestler Buh Buh Ray Dudley. Goto defeated Dudley to retain his title, pinning him following a brainbuster.

=== Results ===
No.	Results	Stipulations	Times
1	Orito defeated Felinito by pinfall	Singles match	6:51
2	Emi Motokawa defeated Kiyoko Ichiki by pinfall	Singles match	11:18
3	Hiroshi Itakura, Katsumi Hirano, and Tortuga defeated Akinori Tsukioka, Flying Kid Ichihara, and Ryo Miyake	Six man tag team match	14:06
4	Stevie Richards defeated Keizo Matsuda by pinfall	Singles match	5:38
5	Leatherface and Terry Gordy defeated the Blackhearts (Blackheart Apocalypse and Blackheart Destruction) by pinfall	Tag team match	7:01
6	The Eliminators (Kronus and Saturn) defeated Keisuke Yamada and Takashi Okano by pinfall	Interpromotional tag team match	14:01
7	Raven (c) defeated Tommy Dreamer (with Beulah McGillicutty) by pinfall	Singles match for the ECW World Heavyweight Championship	11:18
8	Tarzan Goto (c) defeated Buh Buh Ray Dudley by pinfall	Singles match for the IWA World Heavyweight Championship	4:38
(c) / – the champion(s) heading into the match
