= Missy Hyatt =

American professional wrestling valet (born 1963)

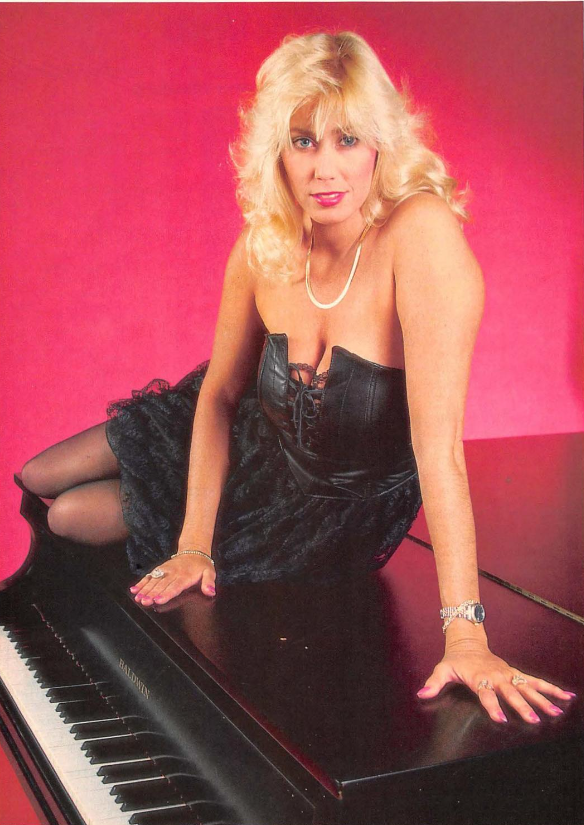
- Hyatt c. 1988
- Born: Melissa Ann Hiatt; October 16, 1963 (age 62); Tallahassee, Florida, U.S.
- Education: Marymount Manhattan College
- Occupations: Professional wrestling valet and commentator; occasional professional wrestler
- Spouse: Eddie Gilbert (m. 1987; div. 1989)
- Professional wrestling career
- Ring name: Missy Hyatt
- Billed from: Tampa, Florida
- Debut: September 1985
- Retired: July 18, 2021

Melissa Ann Hiatt (born October 16, 1963), better known by her ring name, Missy Hyatt, is an American retired professional wrestling valet, commentator, model and occasional professional wrestler. She is best known for her appearances with World Championship Wrestling from 1987 to 1994; she has also appeared with World Class Championship Wrestling, the Universal Wrestling Federation, the World Wrestling Federation (now WWE), Extreme Championship Wrestling, and Impact Wrestling.

== Professional wrestling career ==
=== World Class Championship Wrestling (1985–1986) ===
Hyatt's professional wrestling career began in September 1985 when she was hired by the Dallas, Texas-based promotion World Class Championship Wrestling (WCCW) as a valet for her then-boyfriend, professional wrestler John Tatum. She became known for hitting her rivals with a "loaded" Gucci purse. She was embroiled in a feud with another valet in WCCW, Sunshine. This rivalry culminated into a mud-pit match at Texas Stadium in 1986.

=== Universal Wrestling Federation (1986–1987) ===
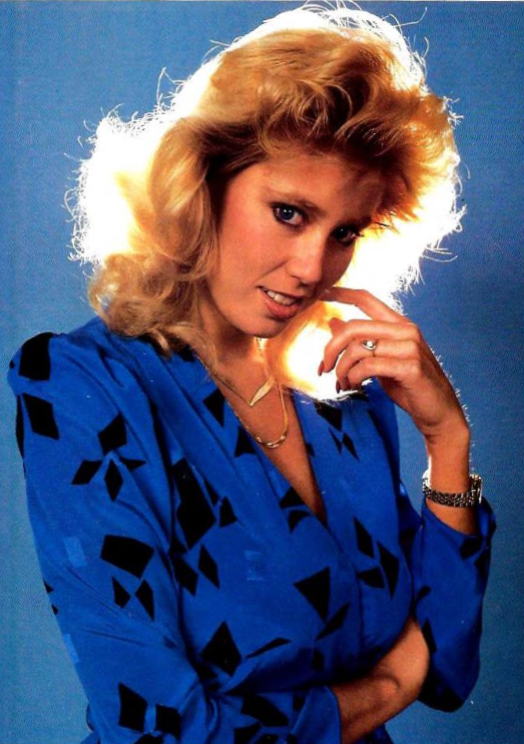
Hyatt in 1986

In mid-1986, Hyatt and Tatum joined the Oklahoma-based Universal Wrestling Federation. Hyatt quickly began a lengthy feud with fellow valet Dark Journey that lasted until early-1987. Hyatt and Tatum joined Eddie Gilbert's stable, "Hot Stuff International", which was eventually renamed "Hot Stuff & Hyatt International". After a disagreement between Tatum and Gilbert, Hyatt aligned herself with Gilbert by hitting Tatum with her loaded purse during a bout between the two men.

=== World Wrestling Federation (1987) ===
While still under UWF contract, Hyatt was contacted about working for the World Wrestling Federation (WWF). Vince McMahon wanted Hyatt to replace Rowdy Roddy Piper and his segment, Piper's Pit, with a new segment called "Missy's Manor". "Missy's Manor" segments were taped on March 21 and 22, and April 23, 1987. Despite having big name stars on her segment such as "Macho Man" Randy Savage with Miss Elizabeth, The Honky Tonk Man and Harley Race, the show was considered a disappointment, and McMahon asked Hyatt to become a "Federette", one of the female attendants employed at television tapings to carry wrestlers' gowns and other pre-match apparel backstage at the start of bouts. She thought the role was beneath her, and she went back to the UWF.

=== Continental Wrestling Association / Continental Championship Wrestling (1988) ===
In 1987, when the UWF was purchased by the National Wrestling Alliance's Jim Crockett Promotions, Hyatt and Gilbert briefly came along (Gilbert appeared in a six-man tag match as Starrcade (1987)) before moving to the Memphis, Tennessee-based Continental Wrestling Association where Hyatt accompanied Gilbert in his feud with Jerry Lawler. The couple later moved to the Knoxville, Tennessee-based Continental Championship Wrestling promotion where Hyatt revived the "Missy's Manor" interview segment. On one edition, Hyatt was held down by Samoans Sika and Kokina and forcibly kissed by their manager Alan Martin. After Gilbert declined to help Hyatt owing to important alliances with Martin, she began managing opponents to feud with Martin.

=== World Championship Wrestling (1988–1994) ===
Hyatt returned to WCW with Gilbert when he decided to help Jimmy Garvin in his feud with Kevin Sullivan. She was used as a commentator, conducting her debut interview with Sir Oliver Humperdink on the December 31, 1988 edition of World Championship Wrestling on TBS.

In spring 1989, Hyatt became the manager of the Steiner Brothers, during which time she was billed as the girlfriend of Scott Steiner. After Robin Green was introduced as the girlfriend of Rick Steiner, Hyatt gave her a makeover on the August 26, 1989 episode of WCW Saturday Night. At Fall Brawl in September 1989, during a match between the Steiner Brothers and the Fabulous Freebirds, Scott Steiner was tripped by one of the women at ringside, with Hyatt and Green blaming one another. Later that month, it was revealed that Green had tripped Steiner, with Green turning on the Steiner Brothers and adopting the new name "Woman".

In 1990, Hyatt returned to her role as commentator and hosted WCW Main Event.

In 1991, Hyatt began a rivalry with fellow commentator, Paul E. Dangerously. The feud led to various competitions between the two, including an arm wrestling match at the Clash of the Champions XIV: Dixie Dynamite on January 30, 1991, in which Hyatt defeated Dangerously. A contributing factor to her victory might be that Hyatt had removed her jacket to reveal her low-cut top as the ref started the contest. In the run-up to the 1991 Great American Bash, Hyatt teamed with various partners to face Dangerously in a series of tag team matches. At the Bash in July 1991, Hyatt and Rick Steiner faced Dangerously and Arn Anderson in a tag team match; Dick Murdoch and Dick Slater carried Hyatt backstage, with Steiner going on to defeat Anderson and Dangerously alone.

Missy would engage in a battle over who the "First Lady of WCW" was with The Dangerous Alliance's Madusa, with Hyatt narrowly winning a Bikini Showdown at the 1992 Beach Blast pay-per-view event. While in WCW, Hyatt made an appearance in the IWA at ringside during a match between The Bushwhackers and The Thunderfoots.

In mid-1993, Hyatt briefly became the manager for the Barbarian, and attempted to recruit Ric Flair on an episode of WCW Saturday Night. At Fall Brawl in September 1993, Hyatt began managing the Nasty Boys, who were re-joining WCW from the World Wrestling Federation. At the event, the Nasty Boys defeated Arn Anderson and Paul Roma for the WCW World Tag Team Championship. Hyatt went on to accompany them to ringside for their title defences at Halloween Havoc and Starrcade. She made her final appearance with WCW on the February 26, 1994 episode of WCW WorldWide, accompanying the Nasty Boys for their successful title defence against Chris Nelson and Scott Allen.

During the Nasty Boys' match at Starrcade, Hyatt's breast had been accidentally exposed when she jumped on Sting's back to interrupt a three count, with a photographer at ringside photographing it. Hyatt states that, when she went to the CNN Center for a photoshoot, a blown-up version of the photograph had been affixed to the wall. Hyatt states that, when she complained to WCW president Eric Bischoff, he failed to take action, and that when Hyatt went over Bischoff's head to his boss, Bischoff fired her in February 1994. Bischoff, however, claimed that Hyatt was fired for her behavior and jealousy over the signing of Sherri Martel. Hyatt filed a lawsuit against WCW for sexual harassment and for overdue payments for her time doing a 1-900 hotline for the company; the lawsuit was ultimately resolved in December 1996.

=== Extreme Championship Wrestling (1995–1996, 2001) ===
After a year-long hiatus from wrestling, Hyatt debuted in Extreme Championship Wrestling at Holiday Hell on December 29, 1995. While giving a promo insulting members of the audience, Stevie Richards spotted Hyatt, who had been planted in the audience. Hyatt agreed to kiss Richards after he promised to get her a date with his ally Raven. Hyatt reappeared at Big Apple Blizzard Blast on February 3, 1996, where Richards announced that he was suing her for sexual harassment (an in-joke referring to Hyatt's legitimate lawsuit against her former employer World Championship Wrestling for sexual harassment). Raven then invited Hyatt to join his stable, Raven's Nest, but she refused and instead offered to become the manager of Raven's enemy the Sandman.

At Fight the Power on June 1, 1996, the Sandman faced Stevie Richards. Prior to the match, Richards served Hyatt by stuffing a summons into her cleavage. Subsequently, a doctor who had recently operated on the Sandman's injured knee came to the ring. After the doctor refused to clear the Sandman to wrestle, Hyatt kissed him, causing him to faint and thus allowing the match to commence. The Sandman went on to win the match. At Hardcore Heaven on June 22, Hyatt allegedly persuaded mixed martial artist Paul Varelans to agree to lose to Taz by claiming she would give him oral sex if he complied, only to renege on the offer after the match, angering Varelans by telling him she did not "blow jobbers". At The Doctor Is In on August 3, 1996, the Sandman faced Richards (substituting for Raven, who was injured) for the ECW World Heavyweight Championship. During the match, the Sandman's wife Lori Fullington (who had become a follower of Raven) hit Hyatt with her boot and knocked out her hair extension, resulting in legitimate heat between the two women.

On August 17, 1996, Hyatt suffered a legitimate broken elbow at an ECW event in New York City. At Requiem for a Pitbull on August 23, 1996, Hyatt wrestled her sole match for ECW, teaming with the Sandman to defeat Raven and Lori Fullington in a very brief intergender tag team match. At Natural Born Killaz on August 24, 1996, Hyatt was scheduled to face Lori Fullington in what was billed as "Catfight '96". However, Hyatt was unable to compete due to her injury. At the event, Stevie Richards offered to drop his lawsuit if Hyatt denounced the Sandman. Hyatt agreed and insulted the Sandman, leading him to give her a stiff blow to the back of the head with his Singapore cane as she turned to leave. Hyatt subsequently left ECW.

In January 2001, Hyatt made a cameo appearance at Guilty as Charged, ECW's final pay-per-view.

=== Independent circuit (1996–2016) ===
After leaving ECW, Hyatt worked for various independent promotions. In 2007, she began appearing with Women Superstars Uncensored (WSU) in New Jersey where she hosted an interview segment, Missy's Manor.

On April 2, 2016, at the 2016 Wrestlecon, Hyatt managed Lance Storm in what was advertised as her final professional wrestling appearance. In the match, Storm was defeated by Matt Hardy, managed by Reby Sky.

=== Impact Wrestling (2021) ===
At Homecoming, Hyatt would appear as Brian Myers' tag team partner in the Homecoming tournament, and would lose to ECW legend, Tommy Dreamer and Rachael Ellering (the daughter of Paul Ellering) in the first round.

== Personal life ==
Hyatt is Jewish. She married professional wrestler Eddie Gilbert in 1987; the couple divorced two years later in 1989. She attended Marymount Manhattan College, graduating in 2001 with a degree in psychology.

Hyatt is a frequent participant in American Civil War reenactments.

Sometime prior to 2026, Hyatt began a long-term relationship with a man named Matthew Roblez, who idolized her when he was in high school.

== Championships and accomplishments ==
- !BANG!
  - !BANG! Women's Championship (2 times)
- Apocalypse Wrestling Federation
  - AWF Heavyweight Championship (1 time)
- Women Superstars Uncensored
  - WSU Hall of Fame (Class of 2009)
- Women's Wrestling Hall of Fame
  - Class of 2024

== Books ==
- Autobiography: Missy Hyatt, First Lady of Wrestling, 2001, ISBN 1-55022-498-0.
