= Stevie Richards =

American professional wrestler and podcaster (born 1971)

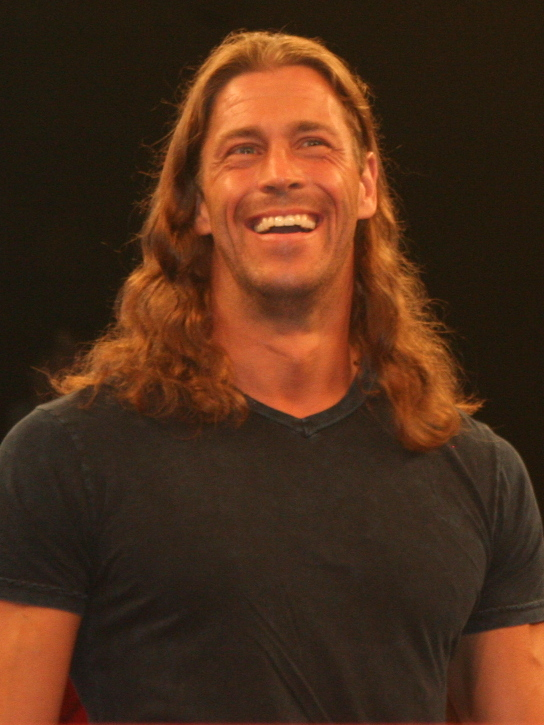
- Richards in 2010

Personal information
- Born: Michael Stephen Manna; October 9, 1971 (age 54) Philadelphia, Pennsylvania, U.S.

Professional wrestling career
- Ring name(s): Big Stevie Cool; Dr. Stevie; Dr. Stevie Richards; Steve Richards; Steven Richards; Stevie Night Heat; Stevie Richards; Stevie Flamingo; Stevie the Body
- Billed height: 6 ft 2 in (188 cm)
- Billed weight: 230 lb (104 kg)
- Billed from: Philadelphia, Pennsylvania "New York City's Bellevue Hospital" (as Dr. Stevie)
- Trained by: Jimmy Jannetty
- Debut: November 10, 1991
- Retired: 2021

Michael Stephen Manna (born October 9, 1971), better known by his ring name Stevie Richards, is an American media personality and retired professional wrestler. Since June 2024, Richards has hosted The Stevie Richards Show, presented by co-host James Romero on the WSI Network.

Over the course of his career, Richards has performed for major professional wrestling promotions including Eastern/Extreme Championship Wrestling, World Championship Wrestling, World Wrestling Federation/Entertainment, Total Nonstop Action Wrestling and Ring of Honor. Championships held by Richards include the ECW World Tag Team Championship, the WWE Hardcore Championship (21 times), the NWA National Heavyweight Championship and the Extreme Rising World Championship.

== Professional wrestling career ==
=== Early career (1992–1994) ===
Michael Manna trained as a professional wrestler under Jimmy Jannetty at Mike Sharpe's wrestling school in Brick Township, New Jersey. He wrestled his first match on February 25, 1992, for the Tri-State Wrestling Alliance as "Stevie Richards", facing Jannetty. He wrestled a handful of matches for Eastern Championship Wrestling before spending two years working on the independent circuit for seasoning.

=== NWA Eastern / Extreme Championship Wrestling (1994–1997) ===
==== Raven's Nest (1994–1996) ====
Richards returned to Eastern Championship Wrestling on June 26, 1994, as "Steve Richards" (later tweaked to "Stevie Richards") in a preliminary wrestling role. His first televised appearance was on the June 28, 1994, episode of NWA Eastern Championship Wrestling, teaming with Hack Meyers in a loss to Dory Funk Jr. and Terry Funk. Shortly after his return, Richards was given a valet, Angel. In addition to his in-ring role, Richards answered calls to the ECW hotline under the pseudonym "Lloyd Van Buren".

At Heatwave '94: the Battle for the Future on July 16, 1994, Richards lost to Tommy Dreamer. In late-1994, he developed an "identity crisis", performing under the ring names "Stevie Flamingo", "Stevie the Body", and "Stevie Polo"—all references to former ring names used by Scott Levy in World Championship Wrestling and the World Wrestling Federation. After sustaining another loss to Dreamer, Richards became irate and claimed he would present "the real Johnny Polo". On the January 7, 1995, episode of ECW Hardcore TV, Levy—now known as "Raven"—made his ECW debut, with Richards as the first member of Raven's Nest, Raven's stable of lackeys. As a member of Raven's Nest, Richards began wearing jean shorts and half shirts for glam metal bands such as Cinderella, Nelson, Poison and Winger. His behavior attracted the scorn of commentator Joey Styles, who repeatedly described him as a "clueless putz" and referred to his attending the Blue Oyster Bar, a (fictional) gay bar.

Immediately upon debuting in ECW, Raven began feuding with Dreamer. On April 8, 1995, at Three Way Dance, Raven revealed that he and Dreamer had attended summer camp together as teenagers, where Raven slept with Beulah McGillicutty, an overweight girl with acne who had been spurned by Dreamer. Richards then revealed that he had tracked down McGillicutty, who was now a Penthouse model, who also harbored a grudge against Dreamer. Later that night, Raven wrestled Dreamer for the first time, defeating him following interference from both Richards and McGillicutty. The feud between Raven and Dreamer would continue for another two years, with Dreamer constantly unable to pin Raven.

In May 1995 at Enter the Sandman, Dreamer introduced Luna Vachon to ECW to counter the continual interference from Richards and Raven's Nest. On June 30, 1995, at Mountain Top Madness, Raven and Richards defeated The Public Enemy to win the ECW World Tag Team Championship. At Hardcore Heaven on July 1, 1995, Raven and Richards defeated Dreamer and Vachon in a tag team match. Two weeks later at Heatwave '95: Rage in the Cage!, Vachon defeated Richards in a cage match.

In the summer of 1995, an unnamed woman began appearing in the audience during Richards' matches. On August 26, 1995, Richards introduced her to Joey Styles as his girlfriend, Francine. Francine began accompanying to Richards to ringside, but tensions quickly arose between her and McGillicutty. On August 26, 1995, McGillicutty defeated Francine after Richards turned on her by super kicking her at the behest of Raven. Francine subsequently aligned herself with The Pitbulls, helping them defeat Raven and Richards for the ECW World Tag Team Championship at Gangstas Paradise on September 16, 1995. Raven and Richards regained the titles from The Pitbulls on October 7, 1995 at South Philly Jam, only to lose them to The Public Enemy later that evening.

At November to Remember on November 18, 1995, Richards introduced a lackey of his own, The Blue Meanie. Over the following year, Richards and The Blue Meanie would perform numerous parodies of other wrestlers, including "Baron von Stevie" and "Colonel DeMeanie"; "Lord Stevie" and "Sir Meanie"; "Stevie Alexander Bagwell" and "Meanie Riggs"; and "Flyboy Stevie Rock" and "Meanie Grunge". In late 1995, Richards received another lackey, Super Nova.

During the opening of Holiday Hell on December 29, 1995, Richards received a kiss from Missy Hyatt, who was seated at ringside, after claiming he could get her "a date with Raven" in return. Later that evening, Richards and The Blue Meanie were squashed by Dreamer in consecutive matches. Dreamer went on to face Raven, who defeated him yet again after repeated interference from Richard and The Blue Meanie. At House Party on January 5, 1996, Richards attempted to kiss McGillicutty, who refused, eventually announcing that she was pregnant. After Raven angrily confronted McGillicutty, she informed him that he was not the father, causing Raven to attack Richards. McGillicutty then revealed that Tommy Dreamer was the father, with Dreamer storming the ring and beating down Raven, Richards and The Blue Meanie. On February 3, 1996, at Big Apple Blizzard Blast, Richards announced that he was suing Missy Hyatt—who had aligned herself with The Sandman—for sexual harassment (a reference to Hyatt's lawsuit against her former employer, World Championship Wrestling). On June 1, 1996, at Fight the Power he served Hyatt by stuffing a summons into her cleavage. The angle concluded at Natural Born Killaz on August 24, 1996, when Richards offered to drop the lawsuit if Hyatt would insult The Sandman. After Hyatt complied, The Sandman caned her, breaking their alliance.

In August 1996, Richards, The Blue Meanie, Super Nova and Don E. Allen parodied the rock band Kiss at The Doctor Is In as "Stevie Stanley", "Meanie Simmons", "Nova Frehley", and "Don E. Criss" respectively. At the same event, Richards substituted for Raven in his ECW World Heavyweight Championship title defense against The Sandman, with Raven entering the ring at the end of the match and pinning The Sandman. Later that month, Richards took part in ECW's first tour of Japan, defeating Keizo Matsuda in a bout in Korakuen Hall as well as helping Raven defend his title against Tommy Dreamer.

The relationship between Raven and Richards began to deteriorate in late 1996. At Ultimate Jeopardy on October 5, 1996, Raven was scheduled to team with Brian Lee against Dreamer and The Sandman in a match with Raven's ECW World Heavyweight Championship on the line. After Raven was announced as being unable to compete, Richards substituted for him, with Raven losing his title after The Sandman pinned Richards. Upon his return, Raven blamed Richards for the loss.

At "High Incident" on October 26, 1996, Richards was involved in one of ECW's most controversial angles, with Raven's Nest "crucifying" The Sandman by tying him to a cross and placing a crown made of barbed wire on his head. The angle, which was widely criticised as being in poor taste, led to Olympic gold medalist Kurt Angle severing his links with ECW and delayed the promotion's debut on pay-per-view.

==== Blue World Order (1996–1997) ====
At November to Remember on November 16, 1996, Richards debuted the Blue World Order (bWo), a comedy stable parodying the New World Order (nWo) in World Championship Wrestling (WCW). Richards began performing as "Big Stevie Cool", a reference to nWo member Kevin Nash, formerly "Big Daddy Cool". Later that night, Richards inadvertently superkicked Raven during his ECW World Heavyweight Championship bout against The Sandman. The tensions between Raven and Richards continued to build until, on December 28, 1996, Richards turned on Raven by superkicking him during a match with The Sandman. At House Party in January 1997, Richards once again superkicked Raven.

At "Crossing the Line Again" on February 1, 1997, Raven scored an upset victory over "Dr. Death" Steve Williams after interference from Richards backfired. At CyberSlam on February 22, 1997, Richards and the bWo came to the ring to berate Raven and Brian Lee, who had given a concussion to Terry Funk. After Lee chokeslammed Richards, Tommy Dreamer, and The Sandman entered the ring, eventually fighting off Raven and Lee. Dreamer then helped Richards to his feet and the two shook hands, marking an end to their lengthy rivalry.

As part of an agreement between ECW and the World Wrestling Federation (WWF), Richards and several other ECW wrestlers appeared on February 24, 1997, episode of Raw is War, with Richards defeating Little Guido.

At Hostile City Showdown on March 15, 1997, Richards faced Raven and Dreamer in a three-way dance for Raven's ECW World Heavyweight Championship. The match was won by Raven. At ECW's first pay-per-view, Barely Legal on April 13, 1997, Richards faced Terry Funk and The Sandman in a triple threat match, with the winner facing Raven for the ECW World Heavyweight Championship in the main event. The match was won by Funk, who went on to defeat Raven.

On May 1, 1997, episode of ECW Hardcore TV, a controversial angle took place in which a morose Raven confronted Richards, telling him he had one final "mission" for him. Raven then attacked Richards before begging him to "end my pain". At The Buffalo Invasion on May 11, 1997, Raven and Richards reformed their tag team to face Dreamer and Funk, with Richards pinning Funk despite bickering with Raven throughout the match. In the main event, Raven, Richards, Funk, and The Sandman faced one another in a four-way elimination match for Funk's ECW World Heavyweight Championship. During the match, Raven DDT'ed both Funk and The Sandman and then demanded that Richards pin them and then lay down for him. Richards refused, instead super kicking Raven and enabling Funk and The Sandman to pin him. During the match, Richards suffered a neck injury when Funk slammed the metal guardrail onto his back and neck. Shortly thereafter, he announced his retirement from professional wrestling, making his final appearance with ECW on the May 29, 1997, episode of ECW Hardcore TV.

=== World Championship Wrestling (1997) ===
Richards broke his retirement upon signing a contract with World Championship Wrestling (WCW) in mid-1997. He made his WCW debut on the July 13, 1997, episode of WCW Monday Nitro, confronting Raven, who had also just signed with WCW. At Clash of the Champions XXXV on August 21, 1997, Raven defeated Richards in a no disqualification match. In September 1997, Richards rejoined Raven, sitting with him in the audience during WCW events. He left WCW in November 1997.

=== Return to ECW (1997) ===
After leaving WCW, Richards wrestled a handful of matches for ECW in December 1997, defeating Chris Chetti at Better Than Ever, before returning to the independent circuit, where he primarily competed in the northeastern United States.

=== Independent circuit (1997–1999) ===
In February 1997, Richards won the MEWF Heavyweight Championship, defeating Axl Rotten. He dropped the title to Disco Inferno two months later.

In August 1998, Richards defeated Doug Gilbert to win the NWA National Heavyweight Championship. Gilbert regained the title in October 1998 at the NWA Anniversary Show. In November 1998, Richards joined Maryland Championship Wrestling, winning the MCW Tag Team Championship with Earl the Pearl in his debut match. The duo held the titles until February 1999. In April 1999, Richards won an eight-man tournament for the vacant NWA 2000 Heavyweight Championship. At the independent supercard Break the Barrier on May 15, 1999, Richards won the APWF Heavyweight Championship, which he held until August 1999.

Richards planned on retiring from professional wrestling to study information technology at the Community College of Philadelphia. His plans changed when he was offered a contract with the World Wrestling Federation in mid-1999.

=== World Wrestling Federation/Entertainment (1999–2008) ===
==== Imitations (1999–2000) ====
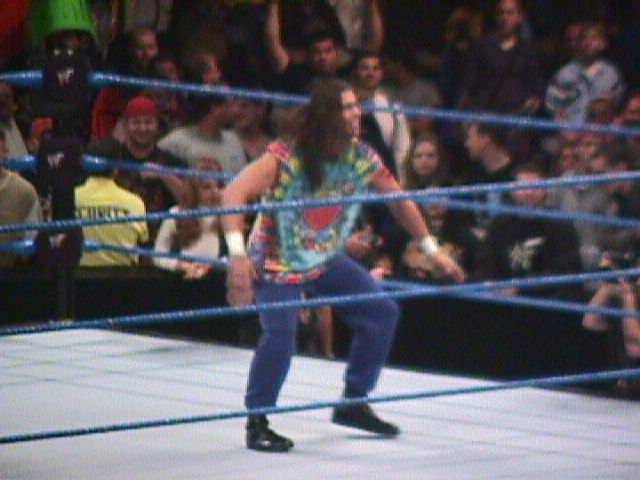
Richards dressed as Dude Love at Smackdown 1999

In 1999, Richards joined the WWF full-time. He debuted on August 15, 1999, episode of Sunday Night Heat, helping his old bWo partner, The Blue Meanie, win a match against Al Snow. The two formed a short-lived tag team, before Richards adopted an impersonator gimmick.

After Sable left the WWF, Richards and The Blue Meanie filmed a series of vignettes lampooning her titled "The Blonde Bytch Project" (a parody of The Blair Witch Project). One vignette aired on the August 23 edition of Raw. The rest ultimately did not as WWF chairman Vince McMahon did not feel they would be understood.

Mocking other wrestler's gimmicks, he appeared as an Acolyte, a Dudley Boy and a vampire of The Brood, until briefly settling on Mick Foley's Dude Love persona. After that, he impersonated Test, Chyna, and Chris Jericho, before being sidelined by an ankle injury. He returned to wrestle matches on Jakked and Metal, where he lost more often than not. He challenged both Dean Malenko and Scotty 2 Hotty for the WWF Light Heavyweight Championship in this period, unsuccessfully.

==== Right to Censor (2000–2001) ====
Richards returned on the June 26, 2000, episode of Raw, with a new look and gimmick, shorthaired and in a shirt and tie, reminiscent of Michael Douglas's character from the movie Falling Down. Over the next few weeks, he cut promos condemning the risqué content of WWF programming and preaching conservative values (the gimmick was a mocking reference to the Parents Television Council (PTC), which was publicly criticizing WWF content at the time). He became a full-fledged heel, formalized his name to "Steven Richards" and formed a stable known as the Right to Censor. He spoke for, managed, and tag-teamed with his recruits: The Godfather (renamed the Goodfather), Bull Buchanan, Ivory, and Val Venis. When Chyna was featured in Playboy magazine, the Right to Censor objected and feuded with her and her (onscreen) boyfriend, Eddie Guerrero.

==== Stevie Night Heat (2001–2004) ====
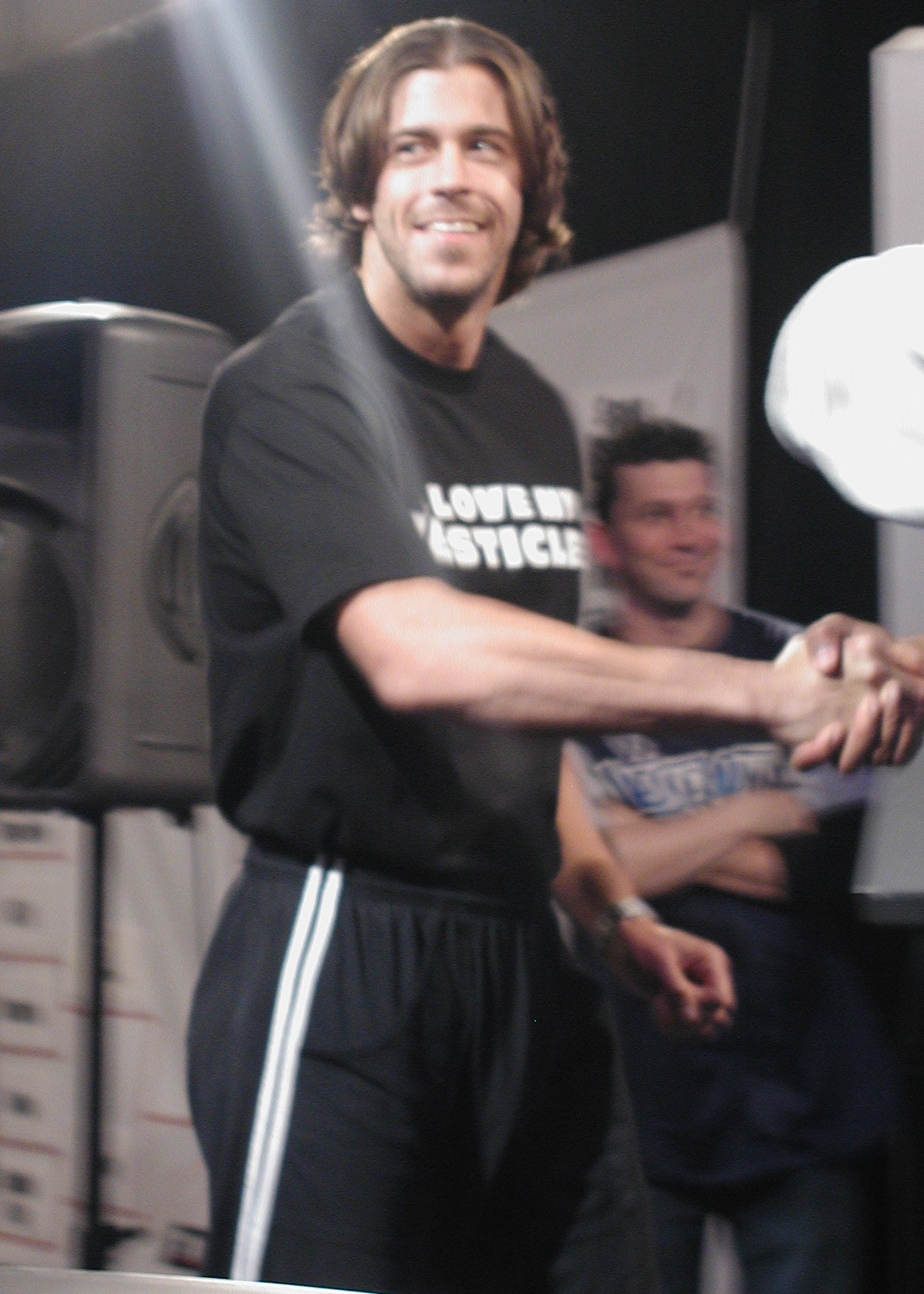
Richards in March 2003

After Right to Censor broke up, Richards disappeared from television for a short time. He returned to SmackDown! to cut a promo condemning The Undertaker for attacking Right to Censor and causing it to disband. When The Undertaker confronted Richards, KroniK attacked him. Richards announced his alliance with the WCW tag team, thus becoming a de facto member of The Alliance. He managed KroniK in a match against The Undertaker and Kane, after which KroniK was released from the WWF.

Richards then appeared mainly on the "B shows", Jakked and Metal, until Team Alliance lost at Survivor Series in 2001. Richards was then fired (in storylines) along with the rest of the Alliance roster by Vince McMahon. Ric Flair was able to save his job and get him drafted to the Raw brand.

There, he became a twenty-two-time Hardcore Champion, trading it several times with Bubba Ray Dudley, Booker T, Crash Holly, Shawn Stasiak, Justin Credible, Bradshaw, Terri, and Tommy Dreamer.

Richards formed an alliance with Victoria in late 2002, as a mentally unbalanced couple helping each other win their matches. He often helped her retain the WWE Women's Championship. This led to a feud with Bubba Ray Dudley and Trish Stratus, who would win their titles in a tag team match on RAW. As Victoria turned face, the duo quietly separated.

Around this time, he proclaimed himself "General Manager of Heat", a title that carried no actual authority. In August 2004, Richards began appearing in drag as "The Mystery Woman" during Victoria's matches, helping her win. The Mystery Woman's painfully obvious identity was "revealed" at Unforgiven, after "she" saved Victoria from Tyson Tomko and Trish Stratus. Richards then quickly lost an impromptu match to Tomko. He went on a losing streak on Heat from April 12, 2004, until May 9, 2005 (when he defeated Matt Cappotelli in a dark match).

==== Blue World Order reunion (2005–2006) ====
Richards was legitimately injured during the Raw debut match of Chris Masters in February 2005, when a botched Polish hammer broke his nose and orbital bone. After healing, Richards faced Masters in a rematch but lost again.

Richards appeared at the ECW reunion event, ECW One Night Stand in 2005, reuniting with his bWo comrades and proclaiming "We have only three words for you. We're taking over!" He then dropped The Sandman with a Stevie Kick.

Richards was traded to SmackDown! on June 30, 2005, and reformed the bWo with Nova and The Blue Meanie. At The Great American Bash, the bWo lost to The Mexicools (Juventud Guerrera, Psicosis, and Super Crazy) in a six-man tag team match.

Richards then had a short stint on WWE Velocity, dropping the bWo gimmick as he lost to Hardcore Holly and Booker T. After September 6, he disappeared from TV for over six months. He returned for an 18-Man inter-promotional Battle Royal at WrestleMania 22.

==== ECW (2006–2008) ====
Shortly after the introduction of the ECW brand in 2006, Richards left the SmackDown! brand to join it on the "WWE vs ECW Head to Head" show on June 7, 2006. He wrestled on ECW's weekly show under his old ring name of Stevie Richards. He soon returned to his heel persona, turning on the other ECW Originals and siding with the newer stars. His first win on ECW's weekly show was on September 5, 2006, over Balls Mahoney, after interference from Kevin Thorn, who was feuding with Mahoney at the time.

Richards wrestled before the ECW brand's first pay-per-view, December to Dismember, defeating Rene Dupree in a dark match. this would be his first victory since April 2004. Other than this match, he did not appear on ECW between September 2006 (when he joined up with the first version of ECW's New Breed—Test, Mike Knox, and Hardcore Holly) and February 2007 (when he lost to CM Punk for a second time).

Richards was a lumberjack in the pre-WrestleMania 23 Lumberjack Tag Team match. He then went on to lose to CM Punk three more times. In mid-2007, Richards turned face again, and teamed with Tommy Dreamer against The New Breed on house shows, replacing The Sandman (who was drafted to Raw) in the ECW Originals.

On July 24, Richards defeated Kevin Thorn by reversing a crucifix powerbomb into a backslide pin. This was his first victory on WWE television since December 2006. In a rematch the next week, he was dominated, yet again defeated Thorn, via roll-up. On August 7, he was ambushed by Thorn while giving an interview backstage. He again defeated Thorn on August 14 by a reverse decision disqualification, when Thorn continued to assault him after initially winning the match. Richards ambushed Thorn during an interview the next week. He teamed with Tommy Dreamer and lost to Thorn and Elijah Burke. A week later, he teamed with CM Punk and defeated them.

Richards was eliminated from the Elimination Chase for the ECW Championship on the September 18 episode of ECW. He then disappeared from WWE programming to have throat surgery.

Richards made his return on the February 12, 2008, episode of ECW, defeating Rory Fox with his signature Stevie-T. He beat James Curtis next, then Mike Knox (Richards' final victory on WWE TV).

In the following months, Richards wrestled in the pre-WrestleMania 24-Man Battle Royal, lost to Shelton Benjamin, The Great Khali and Mike Knox in singles matches, teamed with Kelly Kelly to lose to Mike Knox and Layla and was one of fourteen ECW wrestlers who faced Triple H and Mr. Kennedy in a 14 on 2 Handicap Match on Raw. He commentated on the Extreme Rules match between Mike Knox and Tommy Dreamer on the 100th episode of ECW.

Richards remained on the ECW brand after the June 2008 Draft, but wrestled his final three WWE matches on SmackDown. He lost to Vladimir Kozlov on July 11, 2008, and to The Brian Kendrick on July 25. He was released from his WWE contract shortly thereafter.

=== Return to the independent circuit (2008–present) ===
==== Various promotions (2008–present) ====
Before returning to the independent circuit, Richards' lung collapsed while undergoing a biopsy to determine the cause of a lung infection, causing him to wear a chest tube for several days and miss a scheduled appearance for Maryland Championship Wrestling (MCW).

Richards then occasionally wrestled for MCW and other promotions. He won the Force One Championship Wrestling Heavyweight Championship on February 28, 2009, in Barnegat, New Jersey, defeating Danny Doring, as well as the TRP and Showcase heavyweight championships.

On May 28, 2011, Richards debuted as an announcer for Lucha Libre USA. At the next taping on June 18, he turned heel by helping R. J. Brewer win the Lucha Libre USA Championship, joining his anti-Mexican stable, The Right, in the process. He made his promotional wrestling debut at the next taping on July 30, defeating Rocky Romero after interference from stablemate Petey Williams.

In 2012, Richards wrestled regularly for the Extreme Rising promotion, as well as for the NWA and Florida-based promotions CCW and ICW. On June 16, Richards retained his Showcase Championship Wrestling Heavyweight Title against Marty Jannetty. On October 6, 2012, Richards defeated Aramis to win the American Championship Pro Wrestling (ACPW) Heavyweight title in Vineland, New Jersey.

Stevie spent the majority of 2013 and 2014 either defending the Extreme Rising World Championship on the indie circuit or challenging for titles in other promotions, such as the WildKat Revolution Title, the SCW Southern Heavyweight Championship, the DWE Heavyweight Championship, the Freedom Pro Wrestling Heavyweight Championship, the CCW Southeastern Heavyweight Championship, the W.O.W Heavyweight Championship and the MPW Heavyweight Championship.

Other notable Independent appearances included a one-off return to the Steven Richards Right to Censor gimmick where he defeated Jack Hurley at the SCW Fallout in Florida, reuniting the b.W.o once again for a Pro Wrestling Syndicate iPPV in New Jersey, teaming again with Victoria for Tommy Dreamer's House of Hardcore promotion at "HOH 3" and main-eventing as the titular star of Canada Wrestling Elite's "Stevie Night Heat" event. Richards challenged Drew Galloway unsuccessfully for EVOLVE Championship in Nebraska on September 9, 2014. On November 16, 2014, at House of Hardcore VII, Richards defeated Danny Doring.

On September 4, 2015, Richards, Da Blue Guy, and Hollywood Nova reunited as the Blue World Order for Chikara's 2015 King of Trios tournament. They were eliminated from the tournament in their first-round match by the Devastation Corporation (Blaster McMassive, Flex Rumblecrunch and Max Smashmaster).

On May 28, 2016, in Louisiana, Richards defeated Curt Matthews to capture the WildKat Revolution Championship. Richards retained the title over Matthews in a rematch on July 23, 2016. He retained again over Bob Holly on September 10, 2016. Following his defense, Richards was offered the opportunity from Teddy Long to vacate the Revolution Championship and receive a WildKat Heavyweight Championship match in return. Richards accepted the offer. On November 12, 2016, at the Revolution Rumble event, Richards defeated Heavyweight Champion Bu Ku Dao by pin to capture the championship. Richards made his first successful defense the following week in New Orleans, defeating Vordell Walker.

On July 30, 2016, Richards entered a Metro Pro Wrestling tournament to a new MPW Heavyweight Champion. He was eliminated by Mike Sydal when Sydal used Richards' tights for leverage.

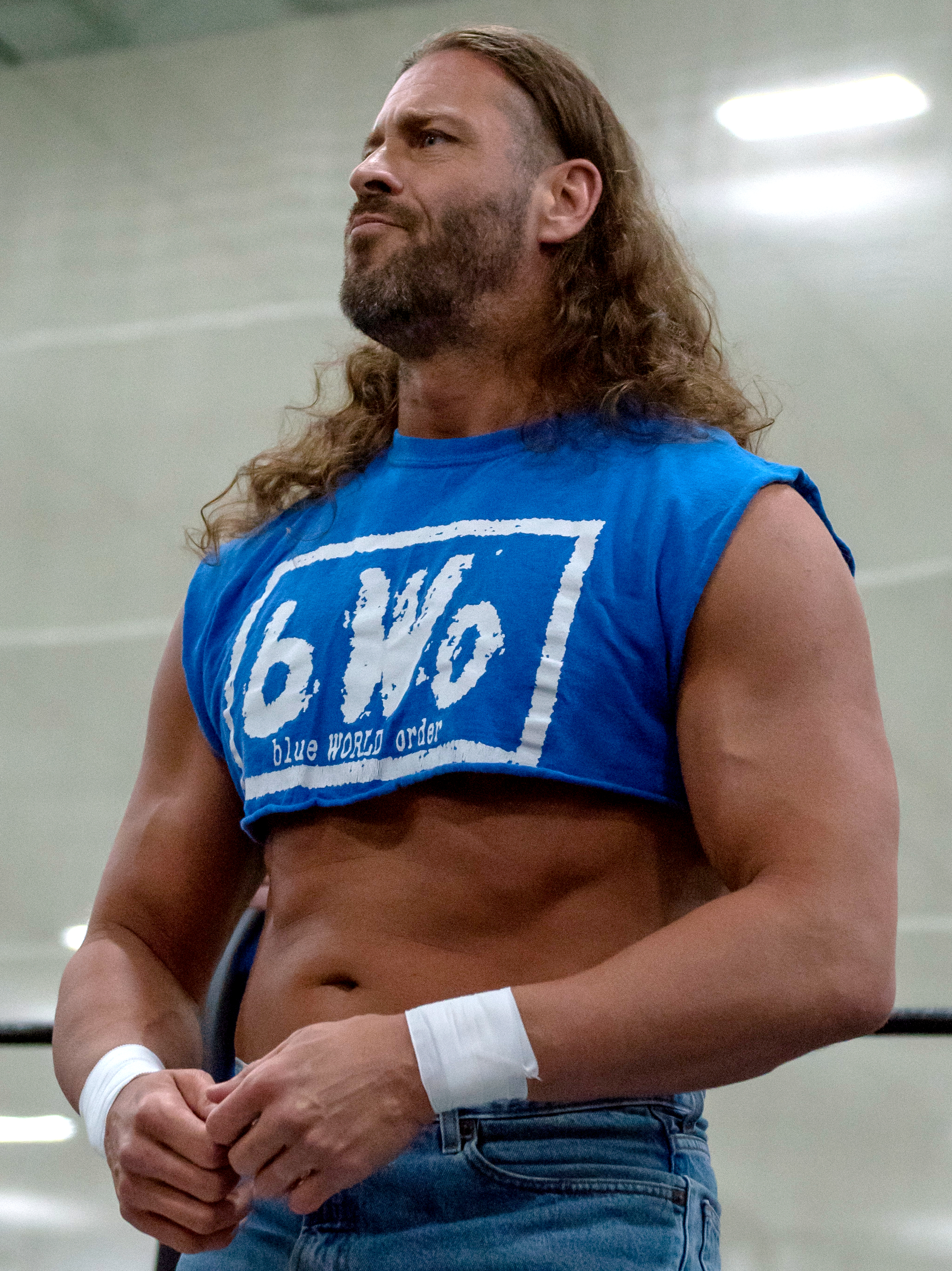
Richards in 2019

On August 7, 2016, in Nashville, Richards defeated Aramis to win the Freedom Pro Wrestling National Championship. Richards would return to successfully the defend the championship in 2017 against Nick Nero and Johnny Swinger.

Richards remained in title contention on the independent wrestling scene when on November 5, 2016, in Miami, he challenged for the No.1 contendership to the ICW Heavyweight Championship in a triple threat with Shawn Prime and Gangrel, where Gangrel was victorious.

Richards began what he dubbed "The Summer of Stevie" following a heel turn in WildKat Sports Wrestling, which would see him retain the WildKat Heavyweight Championship against Ryan Davidson, Matt Lancie, J. Spade, Mr. Anderson and Luke Hawx. His match against Hawx took place at WildKat's Philadelphia debut at the ECW Arena, where Richards competed in Apollo Creed-esque ring gear.

==== Extreme Rising (2012–2014) ====
In early 2012, Stevie Richards was announced to take part in the Extreme Reunion event that would take place on April 28 at the Pennsylvania National Armory in Philadelphia, he teamed with The Blue Meanie once more as the b.W.o against old foes The F.B.I (Guido and Mamaluke). The b.W.o were eventually defeated following outside interference that led to the Blue Meanie being pinned, Richards appearing frustrated would Stevie-Kick Thomas "Inchworm" Rodman, with the announcers who had previously been positively remarking on his conditioning and ring-shape that "Stevie was here to win, not for nostalgia".

Richards would then return for the company in June (now Extreme Rising) and begin a feud with Luke Hawx, who had been verbally attacking the ECW alumni. Hawx defeated Richards using heel tactics in New York but Richards would defeat him the following night in Philadelphia with a Stevie-Kick, earning his first win for the promotion. Richards was then entered into an eight-man tournament to crown the first Extreme Rising World Champion. On November 17 at the "Remember November" iPPV, Richards would defeat Papadon by submission to advance into the semi-finals. Later in the show, Richards would confront Raven who had been running down the promotion, which led to a "Loser Leaves Town" match which ended as No Contest due to interference from Raven's new Flock, who Richards would decimate through a series of Steve-Kicks and Stevie-Bombs.

On December 29, 2012, Richards would win the tournament and the World Championship by first defeating Luke Hawx in the semi-finals and then Rhino in the final round to become the first Extreme Rising World Champion. He would win all matches by submission with the "I'll Tap You", following this final round win, the Extreme Rising locker room surrounded the ring to congratulate him on his first World Championship.

Following Stevie's championship win over Rhino, he soon took the title overseas where he defended against Tarkan Aslan for the DWA promotion in Germany before returning to America and defending the belt for other independent promotions such as Coastal Championship Wrestling, I Believe In Wrestling, and Southern Championship Wrestling Florida. Title defenses then became less regular, though Stevie was due to defend the title three times at Extreme Rising's Wrestlemania weekend shows, notably against mentor/nemesis Raven, the events were cancelled which was followed by a brief dispute with Stevie and Extreme Rising. However, title defenses eventually resumed as Stevie defeated Kenny Kendrick at a SCW show in August 2013 prior to him making his first defense in an Extreme Rising ring at the December 28, 2013, iPPV "Unfinished Business" where he defeated former NWA World, ECW World and WWC Universal Heavyweight Champion Steve Corino by submission. Later that night he ran-out after the co-main-event and Stevie-Kicked top contenders Matt Hardy, Luke Hawx and Homicide as well as Hardy's wife Reby Sky which he would later justify in a video promo.

Extreme Rising and Stevie's World Title reign hit another roadblock when Extreme Rising were forced to reschedule their February/March shows for safety reasons where Richards was due to battle Sabu. Following this, Richards would lose a non-title match at an ECWA show in Delaware to Luke Hawx following outside interference from Papadon where Hawx would 'steal' the World Championship belt. Following this confusion, Stevie would continue to defend the championship without the belt while Hawx would continue to proclaim himself champion while 'defending' the belt also. During this period, Stevie would retain over Chachi in New York for Warriors of Wrestling, Ricky Martinez in Pennsylvania for Central PA Wrestling, Ring of Honor and CZW star Azrieal for PWA in Connecticut and Joey Ace in New York again for Warriors of Wrestling.

=== Total Nonstop Action Wrestling (2009–2011) ===
==== Various storylines (2009–2010) ====
On the February 12, 2009, episode of TNA Impact!, Manna made his Total Nonstop Action Wrestling (TNA) debut as Abyss's therapist, Dr. Stevie. For two months, Dr. Stevie's face did not appear on television, as the camera was positioned behind him during his sessions with Abyss and, later, Daffney. His identity was revealed when he interfered in Abyss's match with Matt Morgan at Lockdown, preventing Abyss from using a chair, which caused him to lose. Stevie's heel role was solidified the next month, when his sessions with Abyss became increasingly abusive. At Sacrifice, Abyss turned on Stevie and chokeslammed him onto a pile of thumbtacks, after he threatened Lauren, Abyss' girlfriend. On the May 28 episode of Impact!, Raven returned to TNA, attacked Abyss and aligned himself with Stevie and Daffney. Stevie lost to Abyss at the 2009 Victory Road pay-per-view.

Stevie scored his first TNA victory on July 19, defeating Cody Deaner with his new finishing move, General Anesthesia, in a match for TNA Xplosion, also streamed on TNA's website. On the July 30 Impact!, he announced he was not done with Abyss and placed a $50,000 bounty on his head. On September 1, he defeated Jay Lethal via submission in another webmatch.

After Lethal Consequences (Jay Lethal and Consequences Creed) and Jethro Holliday failed to collect the bounty on Abyss, Kevin Nash claimed it at No Surrender after pinning him in a Legends Championship match, even though it was supposed to be paid for ending his career. Stevie tried to explain this to Nash, only to receive a Jackknife Powerbomb. On the next Impact!, Stevie took the money back after using a taser on Nash. The feud ended a week later when Nash defeated Stevie in a non-title match.

On the October 8 Impact!, Mick Foley announced that Stevie would be the special guest referee in the Monster's Ball match between Foley and Abyss at Bound for Glory. The match ended after Abyss pushed the interfering Daffney off the top rope through a barbed-wire board (giving her a legit concussion), Black Hole Slammed the enraged Dr. Stevie onto a pile of thumbtacks and slammed Foley onto the barbed wire board. He covered Foley, pulled an unconscious Dr. Stevie over, and used his hand to count the pinfall.

Two weeks later, Stevie assaulted Abyss after losing a match to him; Foley turned on him and saved Abyss. The next week, Foley explained he had manipulated Dr. Stevie all along and had challenged Abyss to test how tough he really was. He then booked Stevie in a match with Abyss for the following week; if Abyss pinned Stevie, he would have to leave TNA. On the November 12 Impact!, Stevie defeated Abyss to save his job, after the lights suddenly went out and came back on with Abyss mysteriously laid out. After the match, Foley (who was commentating during the match) entered the ring and attacked Stevie when the lights went out again. In the darkness, a fireball was thrown in Foley's face. When the lights came back, Raven was revealed as the one who had interfered. Stevie, Raven and Daffney then reformed their alliance and feuded with Abyss and Foley. During the feud, Stevie set Abyss on fire. Spike (TNA's broadcaster) did not allow the footage to air, so it was streamed on the company's website. on the December 3 edition of Impact, Stevie and Raven faced Kurt Angle in a losing effort after interference from Abyss. on the December 17 edition of Impact, Stevie teamed with Scott Steiner, Brutus Magnus, Doug Williams and Raven for a ten-man tag team match against Styles, Angle, Lashley, Tomko and Abyss but lost the match. At Final Resolution, Abyss and Foley defeated Stevie and Raven in a "Foley's Funhouse" tag team match to end the feud. on the January 4, 2010, edition of Impact, Stevie and Raven faced Hernandez and Matt Morgan in a losing effort.

==== EV 2.0 (2010–2011) ====
After months of being off television, he (now billed as Stevie Richards) returned on the June 24 Impact!, in the audience beside Raven and Tommy Dreamer. The next week, the three were joined by Rhino. On the July 15 Impact!, Richards, Raven, Dreamer, Rhino, Brother Devon, Pat Kenney and Al Snow, led by Mick Foley, aligned themselves with TNA World Heavyweight Champion Rob Van Dam, by attacking Abyss and the rest of the TNA locker room, thus turning face.

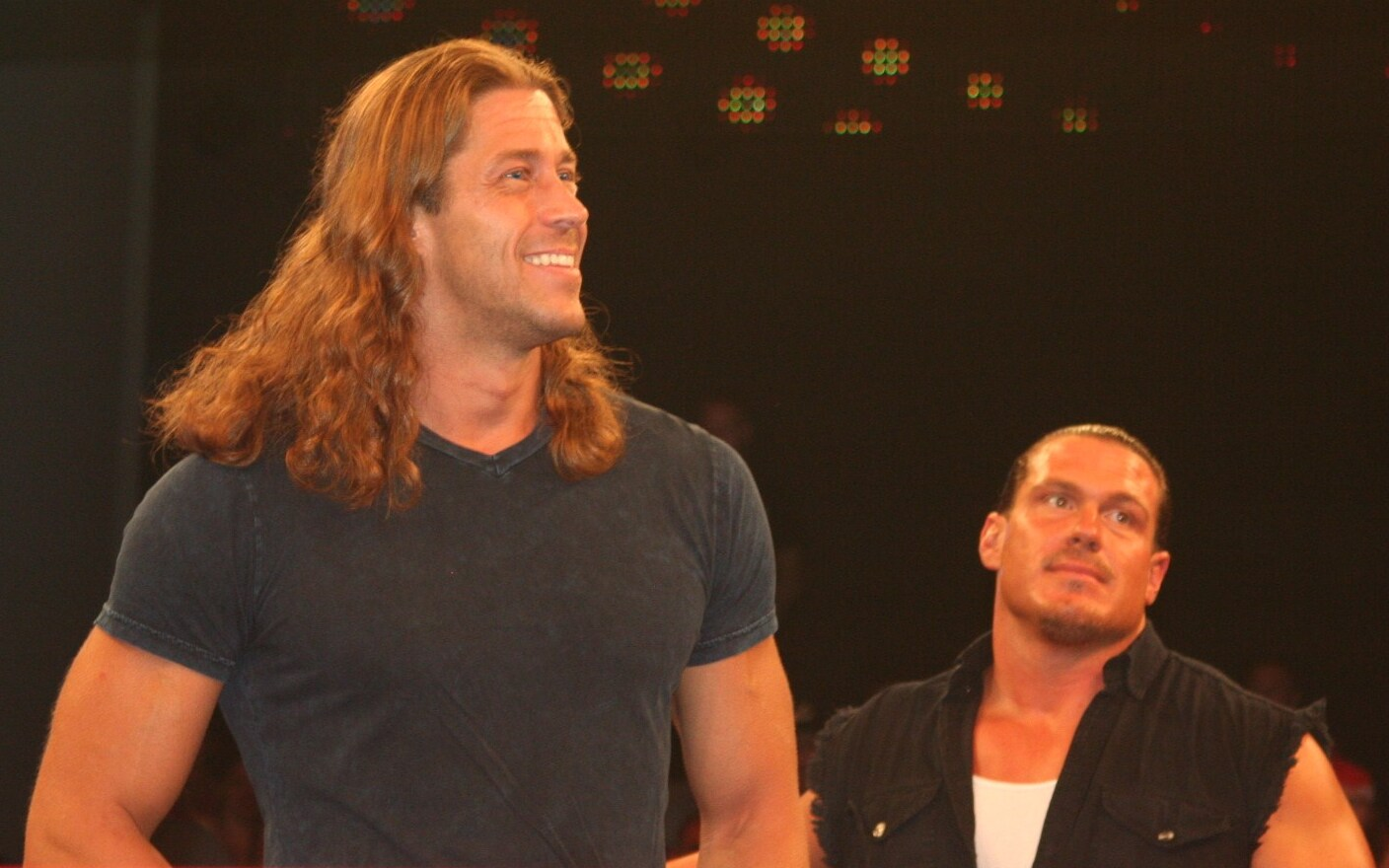
Richards (left) with Rhino in 2010

The next week, TNA president Dixie Carter agreed to give the ECW alumni their own reunion pay-per-view event, Hardcore Justice, a celebration of hardcore wrestling and a final farewell to ECW. At the event, Richards defeated P.J. Polaco.

On the next Impact!, the ECW alumni (known collectively as Extreme, Version 2.0 (EV 2.0)) were assaulted by A.J. Styles, Kazarian, Robert Roode, James Storm, Douglas Williams and Matt Morgan of Ric Flair's Fourtune stable, who claimed EV 2.0 did not deserve to be in TNA. During the assault, Abyss came out, fought Rob Van Dam backstage and caused him storyline injuries which forced him to vacate the TNA World Heavyweight Championship, and caused EV 2.0 to seek vengeance. On the August 26 Impact!, Richards volunteered to take out Abyss, but ended up beaten when he attacked him backstage. The following week on Impact!, Richards defeated Abyss in a singles match. After the match, Abyss was about to attack Richards with a nail-studded board, but he was saved by EV 2.0's newest member, Brian Kendrick.

In late August, Richards began writing a weekly health and fitness column for TNA's website. on the September 2 edition of Impact, Richards defeated "The Monster" Abyss. on the September 24 edition of TNA Xplosion, Richards faced Desmond Wolfe in a losing effort. on the October 7 edition of Impact, Richards participated in a $100,000 Invitational Gauntlet-style Battle Royal which was won by Kurt Angle. on the October 7 edition of TNA Xplosion, EV 2.0 (Richards and Raven) defeated Fortune (Matt Morgan and Douglas Williams).

At Bound for Glory, Richards, Dreamer, Raven, Rhino and Sabu defeated Fourtune members Styles, Kazarian, Morgan, Roode and Storm in a Lethal Lockdown match. At Turning Point, EV 2.0 faced Fortune in a ten-man tag team match, where each member of EV 2.0 put their TNA careers on the line. EV 2.0 lost the match and Sabu was released from TNA. Richards then challenged TNA Television Champion A.J. Styles to a match on the next Impact!. He failed to bring the Television Championship to EV 2.0, and was taken from the ring in a neck brace, suffering a storyline injury. Despite this, TNA streamed a match on Xplosion, in which Richards defeated Okada.

On January 11, 2011, Manna announced he had quit TNA. On an October 2014 interview, Manna explained that he quit TNA because TNA was not paying him a living wage at the time. TNA added Manna to their Alumni section on April 17, 2014.

=== Ring of Honor (2015–2016) ===
On August 29, Stevie Richards debuted for Ring of Honor during an in-ring interview with Kevin Kelly which got interrupted by Jay Lethal that led to a brawl between the two before getting broken up. On September 26, Richards fought (and lost) to Undisputed ROH World Champion Lethal in a Proving Grounds match. Though Richards lost the match, he indicated that he is not going to quit wrestling and will be back with ROH if the management at Sinclair Broadcast Group (ROH's parent company) will have him back. Richards returned to ROH on December 19 in a losing effort to ROH World Television Champion Roderick Strong. Richards returned to ROH in January 2016, losing to Adam Cole.

Richards returned in June 2016, for a series of matches, taking part in the "Road to Best in the World" tour. Richards returned again in September, in a losing effort to Silas Young.

== Podcasting career ==
In 2007, Richards started his own technology podcast, The T4 Show (standing for "Tech Today Tech Tomorrow"). Josh "Colm" Coleman joined the show as Manna's co-host in 2009.

In 2008, Richards joined the Stratford, Connecticut campus of the Connecticut School of Broadcasting as an instructor.

=== The Stevie Richards Show ===
The Stevie Richards Show

YouTube information
- Channel: The Stevie Richards Show
- Years active: 2024–present
- Genres: Professional wrestling (wrestling history); Humor; Current events
- Subscribers: 165 thousand
- Views: 61,134,658
- Last updated: March 28, 2026

In June 2024, Richards launched the weekly show The Stevie Richards Show on the WSI Network. The show sees Richards respond to wrestling-related question from his fans, and his producer and co-host, James Romero, as well as Richards shooting on his time and experiences throughout his time the professional wrestling business.

== Personal life ==
Manna is of Italian origin.

In 2011, he pitched a perfect game in the MLB 2K11 video game. A promotional contest offered a million dollars to the first person to accomplish this, but because Manna did so before the contest officially started, he did not win the money.

In early 2023, Manna suffered constant and high-level back pain following a morning workout. After treatment at the Mayo Centre in Jacksonville, Florida, it was discovered that he had an infection which had recently reached his spine and quickly progressed to osteomyelitis on his L4 and L5 vertebrae. Doctors told Manna that if this went undiagnosed it could have been fatal. Manna began to document his recovery on his social media channels. Manna believes the initial infection was a result of a dog bite he suffered at a neighbor's house a few months prior.

== Championships and accomplishments ==
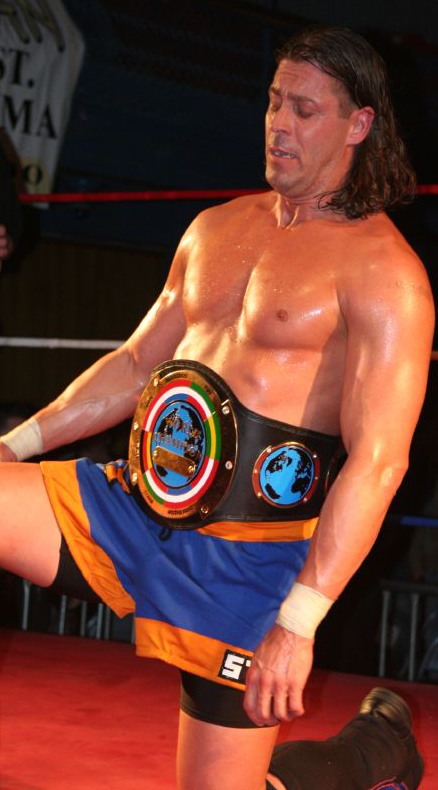
Richards as the Top Rope Promotions World Heavyweight Champion in March 2009

- Allied Powers Wrestling Federation
  - APWF Heavyweight Championship (1 time)
- American Championship Pro Wrestling
  - ACPW Heavyweight Championship (1 time)
- Cajun Wrestling Federation
  - CWF United States Heavyweight Championship (1 time)
- The Dynasty
  - Dynasty Tag Team Championship (1 time) – with Bin Hamin and Papadon
- Extreme Championship Wrestling
  - ECW World Tag Team Championship (2 times) – with Raven
- Extreme Rising
  - Extreme Rising World Championship (1 time)
  - Extreme Rising World Title Tournament (2012)
- Freedom Pro Wrestling
  - FPW National Championship (1 time)
  - FPW Tag Team Championship (1 time) – with The Blue Meanie
- Heartland Wrestling Association
  - HWA Heavyweight Championship (1 time)
- Liberty All-Star Wrestling
  - LAW Heavyweight Championship (1 time)
- Maryland Championship Wrestling
  - MCW Tag Team Championship (1 time) – with Earl "The Pearl" Joshi
  - Most Inspirational Wrestler Award (1999)
- Mid-Eastern Wrestling Federation
  - MEWF Heavyweight Championship (1 time)
  - Most Popular Wrestler Achievement Award (1996)
- National Wrestling Alliance
  - NWA National Heavyweight Championship (1 time)
- NWA 2000
  - NWA 2000 Heavyweight Championship (1 time)
  - NWA 2000 Heavyweight Title Tournament (1999)
- NWA Force One Pro Wrestling
  - NWA F1 Heavyweight Championship (1 time)
- NWA New Jersey
  - NWA World Light Heavyweight Championship (1 time)
- Pro Wrestling Illustrated
  - Ranked #66 of the top 500 singles wrestlers in the PWI 500 in 1997
  - Ranked #390 of the top 500 singles wrestlers of the "PWI Years" in 2003
- Pro Wrestling eXpress
  - PWX Tag Team Championship (1 time) – with The Blue Meanie
- Showcase Championship Wrestling
  - Showcase Heavyweight Champion (1 time)
- Steel City Wrestling
  - SCW Tag Team Championship (2 times) – with The Blue Meanie (1 time) and Frank Stalletto (1 time)
- Top Rope Promotions
  - TRP World Heavyweight Championship (1 time)
  - TRP Killer Kowalksi Cup (2009)
- Unified Championship Wrestling
  - UCW Heavyweight Championship (1 time)
- WildKat Pro Wrestling
  - WildKat Revolution Championship (1 time)
  - WildKat Heavyweight Championship (1 time)
- World Wrestling Federation / World Wrestling Entertainment
  - WWF/WWE Hardcore Championship (21 times)
