= The Eliminators =

Professional wrestling disbanded tag team

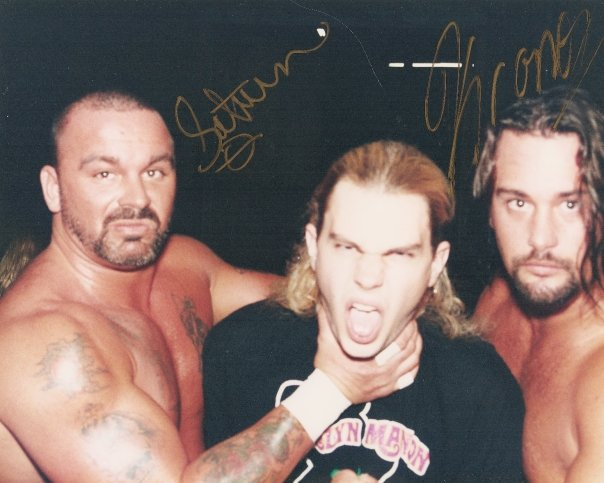
- Perry Saturn (left) and John Kronus (right) with a fan in 1995

Tag team
- Members: Perry Saturn; John Kronus
- Name: The Eliminators
- Billed heights: 5 ft 10 in (1.78 m) – Saturn; 6 ft 4 in (1.93 m) – Kronus
- Hometown: Boston, Massachusetts
- Debut: 1993
- Disbanded: 1997

The Eliminators were a professional wrestling tag team which consisted of Perry Saturn and John Kronus who were best known for their time in Extreme Championship Wrestling (ECW) between 1995 and 1997.

== History ==
=== Formation ===
While working as the manager of a nightclub in Boston, Perry Satullo met bouncer George Caiazzo, who expressed an interest in becoming a wrestler. Satullo sent Caiazzo to Killer Kowalski's school to train, and then offered to form a tag team with him. Satullo took the name Saturn, after the Roman god of agriculture and the harvest, and Caiazzo took the name of Saturn's Greek equivalent Cronus, with the spelling slightly altered as "Kronus". Satullo proposed that the team be known as "The Harvesters of Sorrow" due to the significance of their ring names, but promoter Jerry Lawler advised Satullo that the significance would not be evident to many fans. The team then became known as "The Eliminators".

=== United States Wrestling Association (1993–1995) ===
The Eliminators wrestled their first match together at a United States Wrestling Association house show in 1993. They were hired at a starting salary of $40 a week, and shared an apartment with Brendan Shanahan and James Lewis. After working with the USWA for a while, gaining experience as a team the two managed to negotiate a 100% pay raise. The team's first brush with tag-team gold came when they made it all the way to the finals of a tournament to crown new USWA Tag Team Champions but lost in the finals to Brian Christopher and Saturn's mentor "Hot Stuff" Eddie Gilbert in April 1994. The team kept pursuing the titles and a few weeks later on May 2, 1994, Saturn and Kronus beat Christopher and Gilbert for the titles.

The Eliminators held the gold for about 6 weeks until they came up against PG-13 on June 13, 1994, who beat them for the titles. The Eliminators stuck around the USWA for the remainder of 1994 working both as a tag-team and in individual competition.

=== WAR (1994-1995) ===
In 1994 and 1995, Saturn and Kronus branched out and traveled to Japan to work for the Japanese promotion WAR. On one WAR card they tangled with wrestling legends Mil Máscaras, Bob Backlund and Jimmy Snuka.

=== World Championship Wrestling (1995) ===
On April 2, 1995, The Eliminators wrestled for WCW Saturday Night in Atlanta defeating Barry Houston and Kenny Kendall.

=== World Wrestling Federation (1995) ===
On August 17, 1995, The Eliminators wrestled in a house show for WWF in Manchester, New Hampshire defeating Smooth Operator and Tim McNeeany.

=== Extreme Championship Wrestling (1995–1997) ===
During their tour of Japan the compactly-built and heavily tattooed Saturn and the high-flying Kronus caught the attention of booker Paul Heyman. Heyman signed the two with Extreme Championship Wrestling when they were originally brought in to job to the Steiner Brothers when he thought they were staying with the company for a lengthy period, however they would later defeat The Steiner Brothers and Taz at Gangstas Paradise on September 16, 1995. Heyman initially planned on giving the Eliminators a sadomasochism gimmick and but soon changed his mind and presented the duo as an unstoppable force ala The Road Warriors. He also gave them a manager, Jason Knight, to compensate for their weak interview skills.

The Eliminators started a violent feud with The Pitbulls whom they clashed with repeatedly between October 1995 and April 1996 losing to them at the supercard November To Remember 1995 although they would defeat them in rematches at December to Dismember and Holiday Hell 1995.

During their feud, the teams clashed in both in regular tag-team competition such as during December To Dismember when teaming with Raven, Stevie Richards and The Heavenly Bodies in an Ultimate Jeopardy Steel Cage match against the Pitbulls, Public Enemy and Tommy Dreamer on December 9, 1995. After The Pitbulls' manager Francine cut Saturn's hair at Big Apple Blizzard Blast in February 1996, he shaved his head completely in a homage to Mickey Knox, the character depicted by Woody Harrelson in Natural Born Killers (in reality, Saturn was beginning to go bald).

On February 2, 1996, at Big Apple Blizzard Blast the Eliminators beat Cactus Jack and Mikey Whipwreck to win the ECW World Tag Team Championship. After disposing of the longtime rivals the Pitbulls at Big Ass Extreme Bash on March 8 (although the team defeated the Pitbulls in later house shows), the Eliminators were targeted by The Gangstas setting off a bloody feud between the two teams facing them in a 6-man tag team match with Brian Lee against The Gangstas and Tommy Dreamer at A Matter of Respect 1996 and later faced them in title defences at Fight The Power and Hardcore Heaven 1996, the latter a resulting in a no contest.

On August 13, 1996, the Gangstas beat the Eliminators for the tag-team titles in a four corners elimination match with the Bruise Brothers and the Samoan Gangsta Party at the supercard The Doctor Is In and, although defeated in subsequent rematches, The Gangstas managed to hold on to the gold until the Eliminators regained the titles at a house show in Middletown, New York on December 20, 1996.

As the Eliminators/Gangstas feud continued into 1997, another team entered the fray making it a three way between the Eliminators, the Gangstas and The Dudley Boyz. After defenses against teams such as Axl Rotten and D-Von Dudley and Sabu and Rob Van Dam, the Dudley Boys won the tag-team titles from the Eliminators at Hostile City Showdown 1997 on March 15, 1997 only to lose them back to the Eliminators at ECW's first PPV Barely Legal on April 13, 1997.

On May 31, 1997, in Trenton, New Jersey, during a three-way dance with the Dudley Boyz and PG-13, Saturn tore his ACL when he landed on a crutch while executing a kick on Big Dick Dudley. Despite the injury, Saturn continued to compete and defeated the Dudley Boyz at Wrestlepalooza 1997 and Kronus continued defending the title in handicap matches against the F.B.I before Saturn competed in a match that saw the Eliminators drop the tag-team titles back to the Dudley Boyz at a house show in Waltham, Massachusetts on June 20, 1997.

After intense reconstructive surgery, Saturn was given a recovery time of as much as a year. He began rehabilitating after two months and returned to action in August although in a diminished capacity due to his knee problems. Saturn had become impatient with what he regarded as Kronus' lack of motivation and dedication, and refused to reform the Eliminators. Paul Heyman offered to release him from his contract if he could find alternate employment. Saturn entered into negotiations with World Championship Wrestling (WCW) and signed a contract with them while not being 100% recovered from his knee injury.

After Saturn left, Kronus began teaming with various wrestlers, including former enemy New Jack to form The Gangstanators but never achieved the same success as he did together with Saturn.

Kronus died from a heart attack on July 18, 2007, at 38.

== Championships and accomplishments ==
- Extreme Championship Wrestling
  - ECW World Tag Team Championship (3 times)
- Pro Wrestling Illustrated
  - PWI ranked them #89 of the 100 best tag teams of the "PWI Years" in 2003
- United States Wrestling Association
  - USWA World Tag Team Championship (1 time)

== See also ==
- The Gangstanators
