= The Blue Meanie =

American professional wrestler (born 1973)

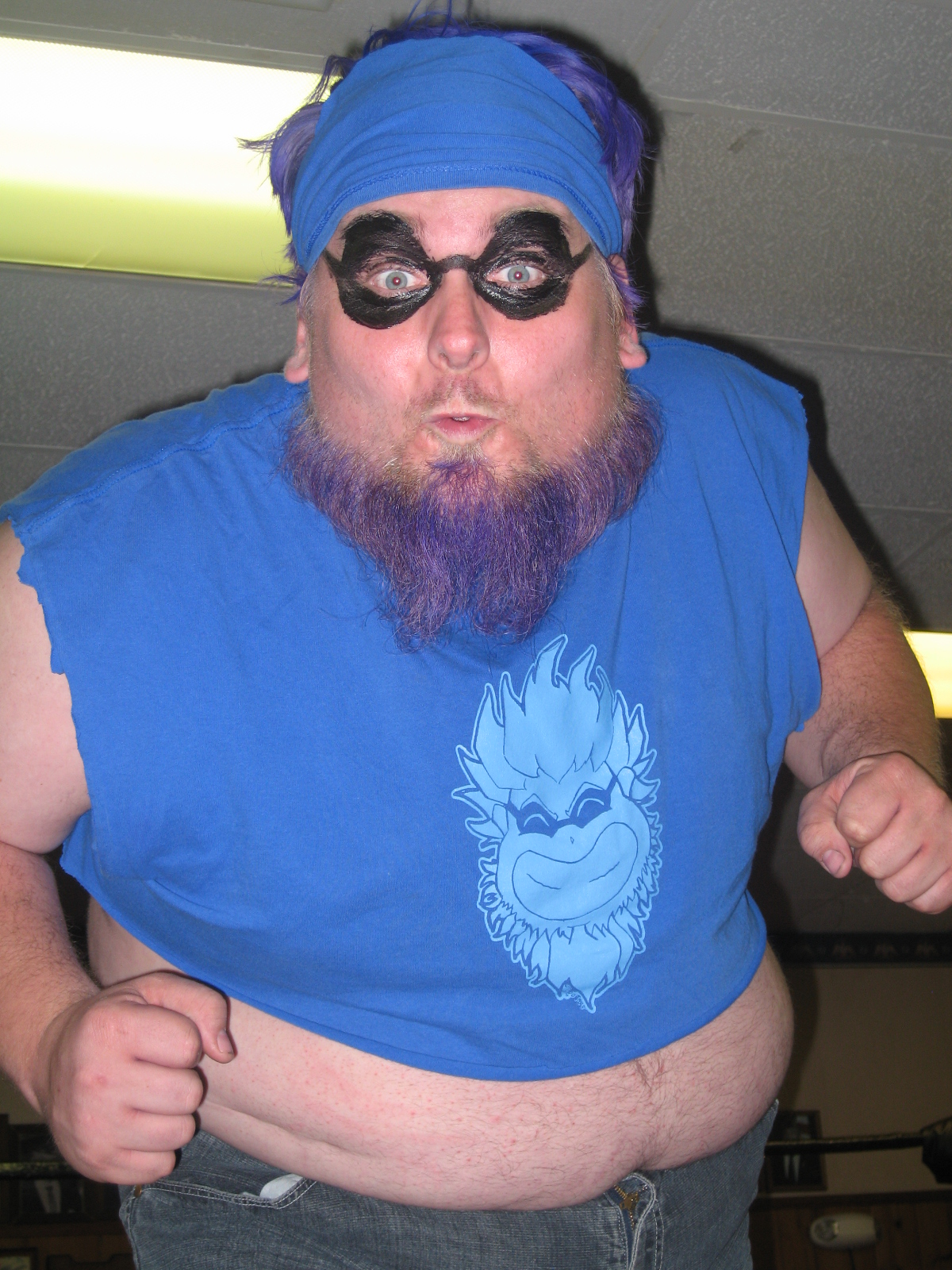
- The Blue Meanie in 2007

Personal information
- Born: Brian Heffron; May 18, 1973 (age 53) Philadelphia, Pennsylvania, U.S.

Professional wrestling career
- Ring name(s): Bluedust; Brian Estévez; Brian Rollins; Da Blue Guy; The Blue Boy; The Blue Meanie; The Zebra Kid
- Billed height: 6 ft 1 in (185 cm)
- Billed weight: 323 lb (147 kg)
- Billed from: "Pepperland"; Philadelphia, Pennsylvania; Atlantic City, New Jersey (as Brian Rollins)
- Trained by: Al Snow
- Debut: 1994

Brian Heffron (born May 18, 1973), better known by his ring name The Blue Meanie, is an American professional wrestler. He is best known for his appearances with Extreme Championship Wrestling and the World Wrestling Federation/Entertainment between 1995 and 2005. His ring name is a reference to the Blue Meanies, the antagonists from the 1968 animated film Yellow Submarine.

== Early life ==
Heffron graduated from Atlantic City High School in 1993.

== Professional wrestling career ==
=== Early career (1994–1995) ===
Heffron started wrestling in the Midwest out of Al Snow's Bodyslammers Pro Wrestling Gym in Lima, Ohio in March 1994. He continued to wrestle in various independent wrestling promotions throughout the Mid-Atlantic and Midwest regions until 1995.

=== Extreme Championship Wrestling (1995–1998) ===
Heffron was noticed by Raven and Stevie Richards at a Steel City Wrestling show in Pittsburgh, Pennsylvania, and was asked by Raven to become Richards' sidekick in ECW. He went on to become "The Blue Meanie", taking his name and persona from the villains of the 1968 animated film Yellow Submarine, in 1995 in ECW at the November To Remember event. He was the flunky for Richards, who was himself the flunky for Raven. Heffron, Richards, and Super Nova performed several skits but their most famous was the bWo, a parody of WCW's top heel group, the nWo. Meanie played the role of "Da Blue Guy" in the bWo, lampooning nWo member Scott Hall's nickname "The Bad Guy".

After Richards left ECW in May 1997, the Blue Meanie continued to team with Super Nova throughout 1997 and 1998. At Wrestlepalooza in May 1998, they defeated the Full Blooded Italians. At November to Remember in November 1998, they defeated Danny Doring and Roadkill. The Blue Meanie wrestled his final match for ECW on November 21, 1998, leaving to join the World Wrestling Federation later that month.

=== World Wrestling Federation (1998–2000) ===
Heffron made his World Wrestling Federation debut on the November 29, 1998, episode of Sunday Night Heat, interfering in a match between Duane Gill and Christian. He then spent some time as part of Al Snow's J.O.B. Squad. He rose to short prominence as "Bluedust", a revival of a 1996 mockery of the Goldust gimmick he used in ECW, this time paired with Goldust himself. Bluedust and Goldust were pitted against one another at the WWF's St. Valentine's Day Massacre: In Your House pay-per-view, a match Goldust eventually won. Heffron would later be pulled under Goldust's "spell", calling him "mommy" and serving as a manager, all the while bickering with Goldust's other manager, Ryan Shamrock. After Goldust dumped both Meanie and Shamrock, Heffron made little headway in the WWF. He challenged Jeff Jarrett for the WWF Intercontinental Championship on the July 17, 1999, episode of Shotgun Saturday Night, but lost. Throughout the remainder of 1999, the Blue Meanie wrestled primarily on house shows and on episodes of Shotgun Saturday Night, Sunday Night Heat, and Jakked. His last WWF match was on Sunday Night Heat on October 26, 1999, when he lost to Godfather. He appeared in cameo appearances on Raw and Smackdown until November 1999. He was featured at Survivor Series (1999) getting beaten up by The Big Show in the locker room.

Afterwards, he was sent down to developmental territories and the independent circuit. In March 2000, he was assigned to Memphis Championship Wrestling for seasoning; while there, he teamed with Jim Neidhart as the New Foundation. Meanie lost to K-Krush in a Loser Leaves Town match on April 29. He was released by the WWF in June 2000.

=== Extreme Championship Wrestling (2000) ===
Under the name "Blue Boy", Heffron returned to Extreme Championship Wrestling in August 2000. During this period, Heffron had lost over 100 pounds of weight. His gimmick was that of an arrogant stud who would insult the looks and weight of fans and other wrestlers, in an ironic twist. He wrestled for ECW until December 2000, with his final match being a bout against Chilly Willy at Holiday Hell 2000.

=== Independent circuit; Pro Pain Pro Wrestling (2001–2005) ===
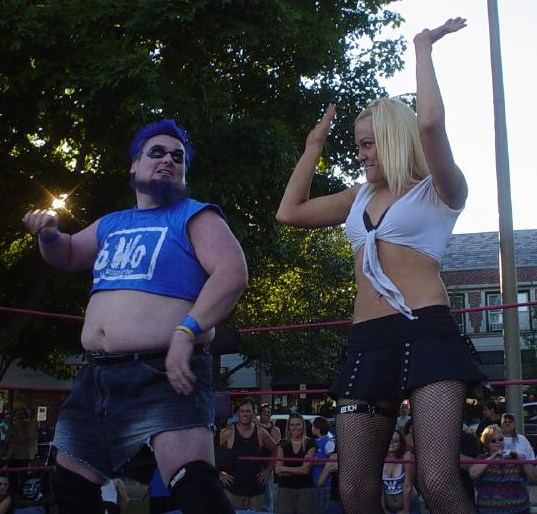
The Blue Meanie (left) and Talia Madison (right) at an independent show in 2005

After leaving ECW once more before the company was bought by the WWF, the Blue Meanie returned to the independent circuit. In February 2002, he opened his own promotion, the Philadelphia, Pennsylvania-based Pro Pain Pro Wrestling.

=== World Wrestling Entertainment (2005) ===
The Blue Meanie appeared at WWE's ECW One Night Stand pay-per-view on June 12, 2005. He made headlines at the event for being bloodied and deliberately (and legitimately) injured by WWE wrestler John "Bradshaw" Layfield (JBL). A few weeks after the incident, during which time Heffron indicated on his website that he was considering pursuing legal action against JBL, it was announced that he had signed a short-term deal with WWE and reformed the bWo with Stevie Richards and Simon Dean (formerly Nova). On the July 7 episode of SmackDown!, the bWo drove to ringside in JBL's limousine, then proceeded to spraypaint "bWo" on the hood. This led to a No Disqualification match between JBL and Meanie later that evening, which Meanie won after interference from Richards, who hit a notoriously stiff chair shot to JBL's head, and World Heavyweight Champion Batista. Stevie Richards has gone on to say that he "still feels bad about it". The Mexicools later defeated Meanie, Richards, and Nova in a six-man tag match at The Great American Bash.

=== Independent circuit (2005–2022) ===
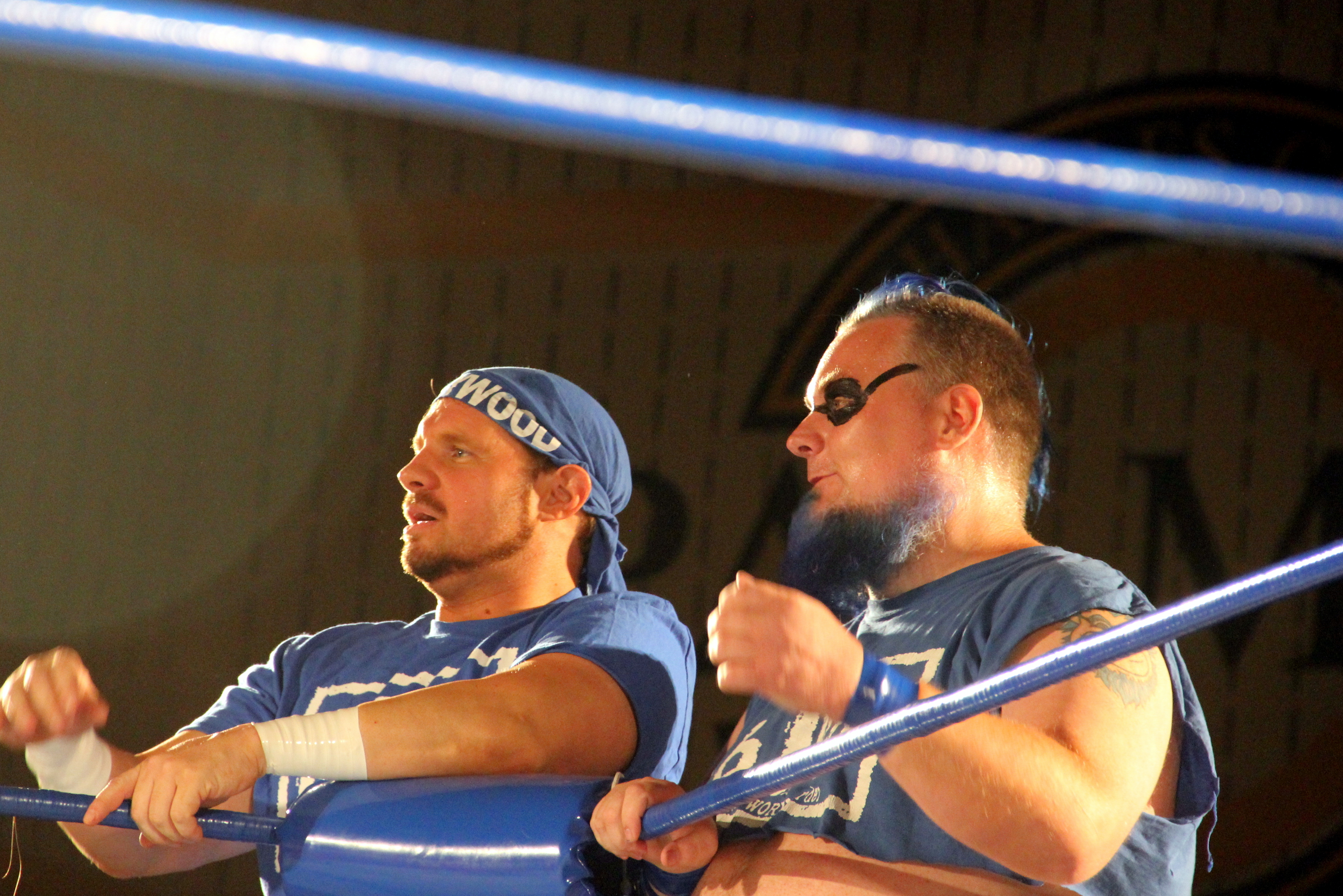
Da Blue Guy (right) with Hollywood Nova at Chikara's King of Trios event in 2015

In 2005, Heffron wrestled at Hardcore Homecoming against Tracy Smothers in what commentator Joey Styles called a "comedy match", and also appeared with Raven during Raven's match against Sandman. In April 2006, Heffron announced on his blog that he had been diagnosed with empyema, and had undergone emergency surgery to have part of his lung removed. On June 3, 2007, he defeated Smothers to become the World Champion again, but lost it at the next event on August 5, to Jason Bane in a Street Fight. On September 8, he defeated Troy Justice to become APWF Heavyweight Champion. On December 28, he was managed by Tammy Lynn Sytch and teamed with The Patriot to defeat The Sychadellic Sissies (Ace Darling and Nicky Oceans) at National Wrestling Superstars Holiday Tour.

On January 18, 2008, he defeated Danny Demanto at a National Wrestling Superstars event in Manville, New Jersey. On April 12, he and JD Love defeated Zaquary Springate III and Isys Ephex in a surprise appearance at 2CW's Living on the Edge. On August 8, 2010, Heffron was slated to appear at the TNA PPV Hardcore Justice; however, he could not attend the event and was replaced by a fake Blue Meanie named The Blue Tilly.

On September 4, 2015, Da Blue Guy, Big Stevie Cool and Hollywood Nova reunited as the Blue World Order for Chikara's 2015 King of Trios tournament. They were eliminated from the tournament in their first round match by the Devastation Corporation (Blaster McMassive, Flex Rumblecrunch and Max Smashmaster).

On March 20, 2022, The Blue Meanie joined Aron Stevens to take on the Dirt Sexy Boys in the NWA Crockett Cup.

Under his Blue Meanie name, Heffron currently wrestles; he is also a trainer at Monster Factory.

=== All Elite Wrestling (2021) ===
The Blue Meanie made a cameo appearance with AEW on October 11, 2021, on an episode of Dark: Elevation in Philadelphia, coming out to support Crowbar in a losing effort to Joey Janela.

== Other media ==
Heffron has appeared in the WB sitcom Nikki, the documentary film Beyond the Mat, the film Communication Breakdown, and the cult horror film Swamp Zombies (with Dan Severn). He also starred in the films Curse of the Wolf, Fist of the Vampire, and Warriors of the Apocalypse. He had a small cameo in the film The Wrestler.

In March 2020, Heffron began a podcast called Mind of the Meanie with co-host Josh Shernoff. In January 2022, Shernoff left the program and was replaced by Adam Barnard.

== Championships and accomplishments ==
- Allied Powers Wrestling Federation
  - APWF Heavyweight Championship (1 time)
- Cleveland All-Pro Wrestling
  - CAPW Heavyweight Championship (1 time)
- Dangerous Women Of Wrestling
  - DWOW Women's World Championship (1 time)
- Freedom Pro Wrestling
  - FPW Tag Team Championship (1 time) - with Stevie Richards
- Hardcore Hall of Fame
  - Class of 2014
- Memphis Championship Wrestling
  - MCW Southern Tag Team Championship (1 time) – with Jim Neidhart, as The New Foundation
- NWA New Jersey
  - NWA World Light Heavyweight Champion (New Jersey version) (1 time)
- Pro Wrestling eXpress
  - PWX Tag Team Championship (1 time) - with Stevie Richards
- Carolina Wrestling Syndicate
  - CWS Tag Team Championship (1 time) – with Mike Bucci
- Pro Wrestling Illustrated
  - Ranked #143 of the top 500 singles wrestlers in the PWI 500 in 2002
  - Ranked #500 of the top 500 singles wrestlers of the "PWI Years" in 2003
- Revolution Pro Wrestling
  - RevPro Mexican Lucha Libre Heavyweight Championship (1 time)
- Steel City Wrestling
  - SCW Television Championship (1 time)
  - SCW Tag Team Championship (3 times) – with Stevie Richards (1), Nova (1), and Cactus Jack (1)
- Ultimate Pro Wrestling
  - UPW Internet Championship (1 time)
- West Coast Wrestling Connection
  - WCWC Championship (1 time)
