= ECW High Incident =

1996 Extreme Championship Wrestling live event

High Incident
- The ECW Arena
- Promotion: Extreme Championship Wrestling
- Date: October 26, 1996 (aired October 29 and November 11, 1996)
- City: Philadelphia, Pennsylvania, US
- Venue: ECW Arena
- Attendance: c. 1,350

Event chronology
← Previous; Ultimate Jeopardy	Next → November to Remember

High Incident was a professional wrestling live event produced by Extreme Championship Wrestling (ECW) on October 26, 1996. The event was held in the ECW Arena in Philadelphia, Pennsylvania in the United States. The title of the event referred to the main event: a scaffold match.

Excerpts from High Incident aired on the syndicated television show ECW Hardcore TV in October and November 1996. The bout between the Eliminators and the Miracle Violence Connection was included in the 2000 ECW compilation DVD ECW Extreme Evolution and the 2015 compilation DVD ECW Unreleased Vol. 3, while the scaffold match featured on the 1996 ECW compilation VHS Extreme Warfare Volume 2, the 2001 Pioneer Entertainment compilation DVD Hardcore History and the 2007 WWE compilation DVD ECW – Extreme Rules.

High Incident is best known for a highly controversial angle in which ECW World Heavyweight Champion the Sandman was "crucified" by the villainous stable Raven's Nest, who tied him to a cross using barbed wire. The religious imagery was considered offensive by some and the angle was never aired on television, with ECW issuing an apology. High Incident is also notable for the first appearance of Olympic medallist (and future Impact and WWE Hall of Famer) Kurt Angle in professional wrestling. Angle had considered wrestling for ECW but lost interest after seeing the "crucifixion"; he did not return to professional wrestling until signing with the World Wrestling Federation (WWF) in 1998.

== Event ==
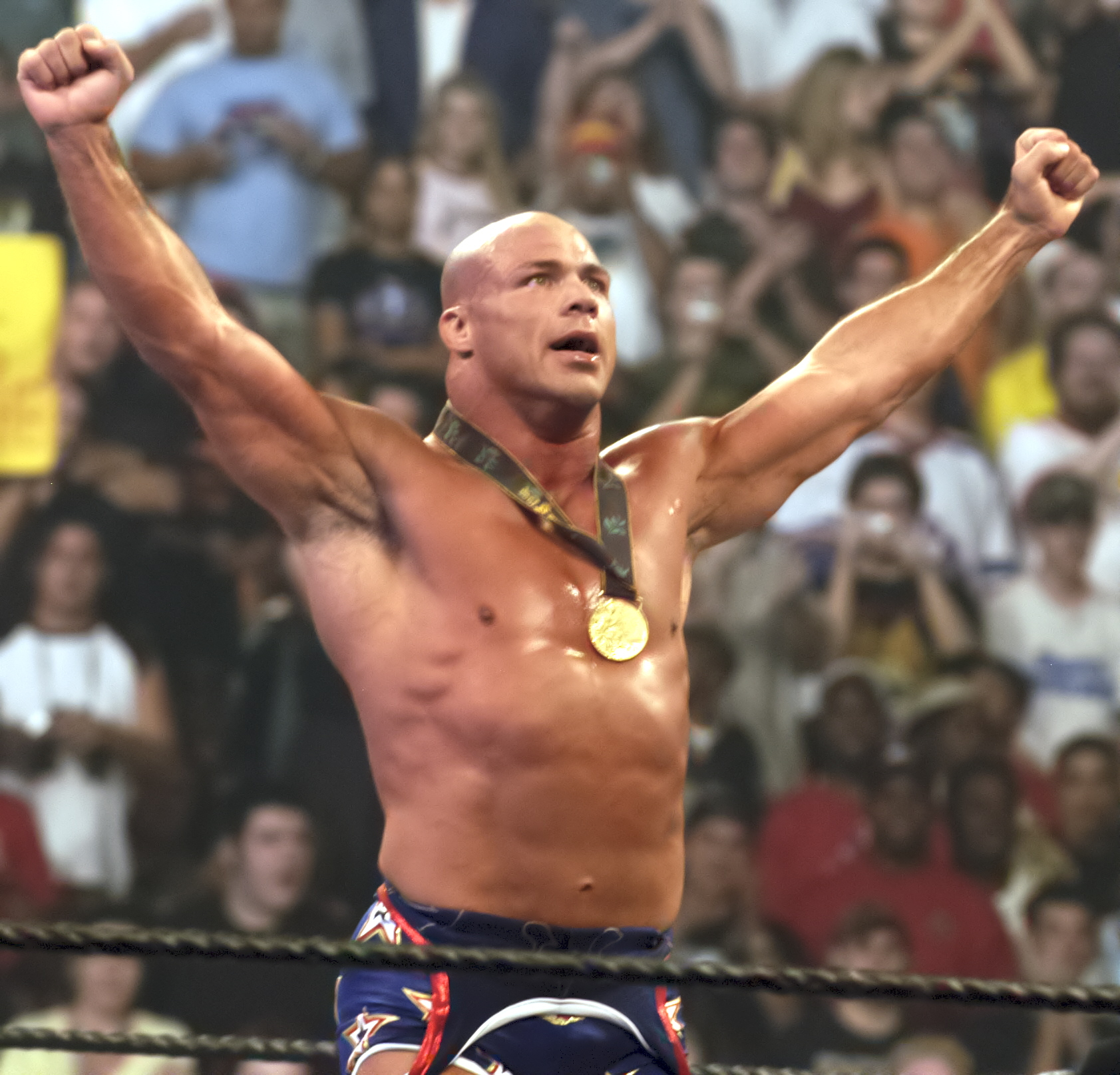
Olympic medallist Kurt Angle made his first appearance in professional wrestling at High Incident.

The commentator for High Incident was Joey Styles, with guest commentary from Kurt Angle for the bout between Little Guido and Taz. The event was attended by approximately 1,350 people.

The opening match was a six-man tag team match in which the team of Buh Buh Ray Dudley, Davey Morton, and Hack Meyers defeated Axl Rotten, D-Von Dudley, and J.T. Smith when Morton pinned Smith after Louie Spicolli interfered in the match, giving him a Spicolli Driver. After the pinfall, D-Von Dudley, Rotten, and Smith attacked Buh Buh Ray Dudley, Morton, and Meyers, and continued the assault until the Gangstas did a run in to make the save.

The second match saw Mikey Whipwreck defeat Johnny Smith by pinfall with a FrankenMikey.

After the second match, announcer Joey Styles introduced Olympic medallist Kurt Angle. Angle was confronted by Taz, who demanded that he join Styles on commentary for his bout with Little Guido. Taz defeated Little Guido in what was billed as a "shoot rules fight" in which the only way to win was by knockout or submission. Taz won the bout by submission using the Tazmission.

The fourth match saw the return of Chris Candido, who had recently left the World Wrestling Federation and worked in ECW 3 years prior. Candido pinned Spike Dudley in a short squash following the Blonde Bombshell, a superbomb.

High Incident featured a controversial angle in which ECW World Heavyweight Champion The Sandman was "crucified".

In the fifth match, Shane Douglas defended his ECW World Television Championship against the debuting Cody Michaels. After a series of moves targeting Michaels' neck, Douglas pinned Michaels following a belly-to-belly suplex. Following the match, Douglas applied a full nelson to Michaels until Pitbull #2 came to the ring and chased him away. Pitbull #2 then threw ring announcer Joel Gertner out of the ring after he insulted him while announcing the result of the match.

The sixth match saw the Sandman defend his ECW World Heavyweight Championship against his ally 2 Cold Scorpio. The Sandman pinned Scorpio to retain the title after Scorpio missed a somersault leg drop. Following the match, Raven's Nest - including The Sandman's estranged wife Lori and his young son Tyler, who had become devotees of Raven - attacked and "crucified" the Sandman, tying him to a wooden cross and putting a "crown" made out of barbed wire on his head. The event was heavily criticized. Raven was forced to make an out-of-character apology to the ECW audience. The footage of the "crucifixion" was never aired on ECW television. Kurt Angle - who had been considering wrestling for ECW in future - left the ECW Arena in disgust due to the incident.

The seventh match was a tag team match between the Eliminators and the Miracle Violence Connection. The Eliminators won after Saturn gave Terry Gordy a diving elbow drop from the scaffold that had been erected for the main event and then pinned him. This marked Gordy's final appearance with ECW, as he left for the World Wrestling Federation later that month.

The penultimate match was a tag team match pitting Rob Van Dam and Sabu against the Can-Am Express in a rematch from When Worlds Collide II. The match ended when Dan Kroffat accidentally delivered a diving splash to Doug Furnas, enabling Sabu to pin Furnas. Following the match, Van Dam accepted a handshake from Sabu for the first time. This marked the Can-Am Express' final appearance with ECW until September 1997, as they left for the World Wrestling Federation later that month.

The main event was a scaffold match between Tommy Dreamer and Brian Lee. The match marked the culmination of the feud between Dreamer and Lee, which had seen Lee repeatedly chokeslam Dreamer through stacks of tables from a balcony in the ECW Arena. The match saw the two men fight atop a scaffold above the ring, with the winner being the first man to knock the other man off the scaffold. Dreamer won the bout by knocking Lee off the scaffold and through a stack of tables in the ring with a flurry of punches.

== Results ==
No.	Results	Stipulations	Times
1	Buh Buh Ray Dudley, Davey Morton, and Hack Meyers defeated Axl Rotten, D-Von Dudley, and J.T. Smith by pinfall	Six-man tag team match	—
2	Mikey Whipwreck defeated Johnny Smith by pinfall	Singles match	—
3	Taz (with Bill Alfonso and Team Taz) defeated Little Guido by submission	"Shoot rules fight"	4:17
4	Chris Candido defeated Spike Dudley by pinfall	Singles match	3:24
5	Shane Douglas (c) (with Francine) defeated Cody Michaels by pinfall	Singles match for the ECW World Television Championship	—
6	The Sandman (c) defeated 2 Cold Scorpio by pinfall	Singles match for the ECW World Heavyweight Championship	—
7	The Eliminators (Kronus and Saturn) defeated the Miracle Violence Connection (Steve Williams and Terry Gordy) by pinfall	Tag team match	8:58
8	Rob Van Dam and Sabu defeated the Can-Am Express (Dan Kroffat and Doug Furnas) by pinfall	Tag team match	—
9	Tommy Dreamer defeated Brian Lee	Scaffold match	8:49
(c) / – the champion(s) heading into the match
