= ECW Better Than Ever =

1997 Extreme Championship Wrestling supercard event

Better Than Ever
- The ECW Arena.
- Promotion: Extreme Championship Wrestling
- Date: December 6, 1997 (aired December 13 and 20, 1997)
- City: Philadelphia, Pennsylvania, US
- Venue: ECW Arena
- Attendance: c. 1,600

Event chronology
← Previous; Ultimate Jeopardy	Next → House Party

Better Than Ever was a professional wrestling live event produced by Extreme Championship Wrestling (ECW) on December 6, 1997. The event was held in the ECW Arena in Philadelphia, Pennsylvania in the United States. Excerpts from Better Than Ever aired on episodes #242 and #243 of ECW Hardcore TV on December 13, 1997 and December 20, 1997 and were in turn released on DVD by RF Video.

== Event ==
The event was attended by approximately 1,600 people.

The opening bout was a tag team match pitting the Full Blooded Italians against Jerry Lynn and Tommy Rogers. The bout was won by Lynn and Rogers, with Rogers pinning Tracy Smothers following a Tomikaze.

The second bout was a "grudge match" between Justin Credible and Mikey Whipwreck in a rematch from November to Remember, where Whipwreck had defeated Credible in an upset. Whipwreck won the match by pinfall following a second-rope Whipper-Snapper after interference from Credible's manager Jason backfired.

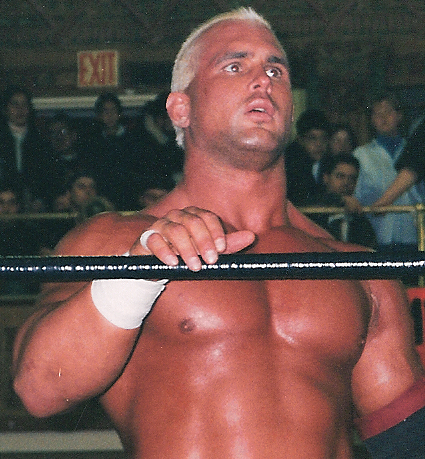
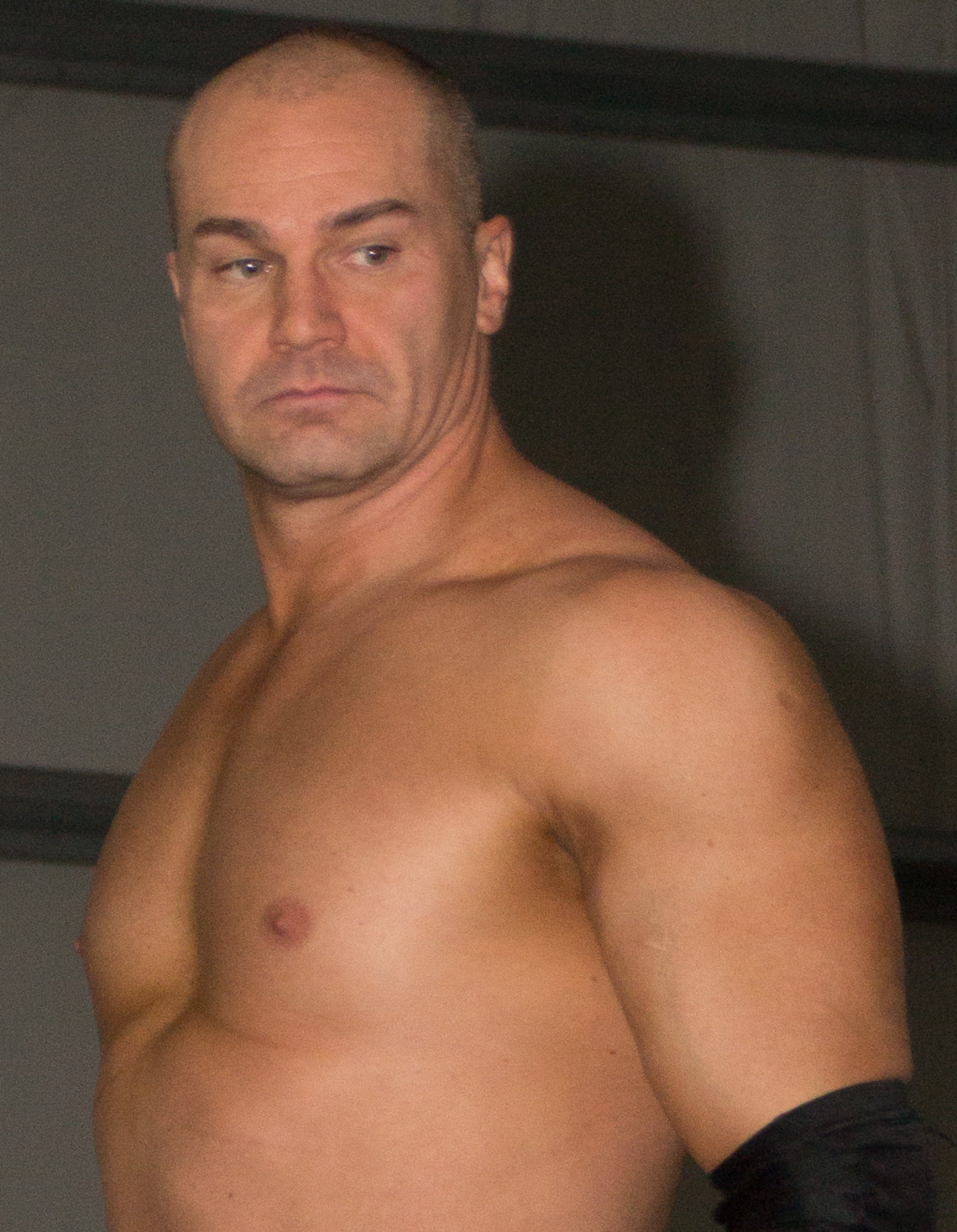
Chris Candido (left) and Lance Storm (right) won the ECW World Tag Team Championship at Better Than Ever.

The third bout was a singles match between Al Snow and Paul Diamond. The bout was won by Snow, who pinned Diamond following a Northern Lights Bomb.

Following the third bout, the Can-Am Express - who had won the ECW World Tag Team Championship at a house show the prior evening - came to the ring with Lance Wright and Brakkus. Wright announced that the Can-Am Express had signed contracts with the World Wrestling Federation and would throw the titles in a trash can on Monday Night Raw. This prompted challenges from both the Hardcore Chair Swingin' Freaks and Chris Candido and Lance Storm, with Candido and Storm's manager Francine suggesting a three way dance. The Can-Am Express were the first team eliminated, with Axl Rotten dropkicking his partner Balls Mahoney as Doug Furnas attempted to powerslam him, enabling Mahoney to pin Furnas. Candido and Storm then eliminated the Hardcore Chair Swingin' Freaks to win the ECW World Tag Team Championship, with Candido pinning Mahoney after the two men gave him a double superplex.

Following the fourth bout, commentator Joey Styles announced that John Kronus had sustained broken bones in both hands in a match against the Dudley Boyz. After Styles attempted to interview Kronus, the Dudley Boyz and Big Dick Dudley attacked him, attempting to crush his injured hands with a chair. This drew out Kronus's tag team partner New Jack to defend him. New Jack was in turn joined by Spike Dudley, resulting in an impromptu six-man tag team match. The Dudley Brothers won the match, with Buh Buh Ray Dudley pinning Spike Dudley following a powerbomb and a blow to the face with a trash can.

The sixth bout was a singles match between Chris Chetti and Stevie Richards in Richards' televised return to ECW following a stint in World Championship Wrestling. Richards won the bout by pinfall following a Stevie Kick.

The main event was a tag team match pitting Rob Van Dam and Sabu against Taz and Tommy Dreamer. The match was won by Sabu and Van Dam, with Van Dam pinning Dreamer after Stevie Richards interfered in the match, giving Dreamer a Stevie Kick. Following the match there was a large brawl involving multiple members of the roster.

== Aftermath ==
Justin Credible faced Mikey Whipwreck once again on December 13, 1997. Credible won the match by referee's decision after Whipwreck suffered a broken leg.

Chris Candido and Lance Storm embarked on a lengthy reign as ECW World Tag Team Champions that lasted until June 1998, when they lost to Rob Van Dam and Sabu.

The Dudley Brothers faced the Gangstanators and Spike Dudley in a rematch at House Party in January 1998, with the Dudley Brothers prevailing once again.

== Results ==
No.	Results	Stipulations	Times
1	Jerry Lynn and Tommy Rogers defeated the Full Blooded Italians (Little Guido and Tracy Smothers) by pinfall	Tag team match	—
2	Mikey Whipwreck defeated Justin Credible (with Jason) by pinfall	"Grudge match"	6:32
3	Al Snow defeated Paul Diamond (with Chastity)	Singles match	3:59
4	Chris Candido and Lance Storm (with Francine) defeated the Can-Am Express (Doug Furnas and Phil Lafon) (c) (with Brakkus and Lance Wright) and the Hardcore Chair Swingin' Freaks (Axl Rotten and Balls Mahoney)	Three way dance for the ECW World Tag Team Championship	9:29
5	The Dudley Brothers (Big Dick Dudley, Buh Buh Ray Dudley, and D-Von Dudley) (with Joel Gertner and Sign Guy Dudley) defeated the Gangstanators (John Kronus and New Jack) and Spike Dudley by pinfall	Six-man tag team match	5:12
6	Stevie Richards defeated Chris Chetti by pinfall	Singles match	1:30
7	Rob Van Dam and Sabu (with Bill Alfonso) defeated Taz and Tommy Dreamer (with Beulah McGillicutty) by pinfall	Tag team match	—
(c) / – the champion(s) heading into the match
