= List of WWF Shotgun Saturday Night episodes =

List of WWE Shotgun Saturday Night episodes

This is a list of WWF Shotgun Saturday Night episodes including episode number, location, venue and that night's main event.

All dates, venues and main events are per IMDb.

== 1997 ==
No.	Date	Location	Venue	Main event
1	January 4, 1997	New York City, New York	Mirage Nightclub	Mascarita Sagrada Jr. vs. Mini Vader (w/ Jim Cornette)
2	January 11, 1997	New York City, New York	All-Star Cafe	Doug Furnas and Philip LaFon vs. The Headbangers (Mosh and Thrasher)
3	January 18, 1997	San Antonio, Texas	Denim & Diamonds	Steve Austin vs. Goldust
4	January 25, 1997	New York City, New York	Webster Hall	Crush vs. Sycho Sid
5	February 1, 1997	New York City, New York	Mirage Nightclub	The Godwinns (Henry O. Godwinn and Phineas I Godwinn) vs. The Headbangers (Mosh and Thrasher)
6	February 8, 1997	New York City, New York	Penn Station	The Nation of Domination (Crush, Farooq and Savio Vega) vs. Aldo Montoya and The Godwinns (Henry O. Godwinn and Phineas I Godwinn)
7	March 16, 1997	Worcester, Massachusetts	Worcester Centrum	Flash Funk vs. Bert Centeno
8	March 22, 1997	Syracuse, New York	Onondaga County War Memorial Arena	Blackjack Bradshaw vs. Henry O. Godwinn
9	March 29, 1997	Rockford, Illinois	Rockford Metro Center	The New Blackjacks (Blackjack Bradshaw and Blackjack Windham) vs. Rod Bell and RT Williams
10	April 5, 1997	Peoria, Illinois		Doug Furnas and Philip LaFon vs. Aldo Montoya and RT Williams
11	April 12, 1997	Muncie, Indiana	Worthen Arena	Billy Gunn vs. Freddie Joe Floyd
12	April 19, 1997	Johannesburg, South Africa	Johannesburg Stadium	Flash Funk vs. Salvatore Sincere
13	April 26, 1997	Binghamton, New York	Broome County Arena	The Legion of Doom (Road Warrior Hawk and Animal) vs. The Godwinns (Henry O. Godwinn and Phineas I Godwinn)
14	May 3, 1997	Omaha, Nebraska	Omaha Civic Auditorium	Owen Hart and The British Bulldog (c) (w/ Brian Pillman) vs. The New Blackjacks (Blackjack Bradshaw and Blackjack Windham) for the WWF Tag Team Championship
15	May 10, 1997	Green Bay, Wisconsin	Brown County Expo	The New Blackjacks (Blackjack Bradshaw and Blackjack Windham) vs. The Nation of Domination (Crush and Savio Vega)
16	May 17, 1997	Newark, Delaware	Bob Carpenter Center	Farooq vs. Jason Ahrndt
17	May 24, 1997	Mobile, Alabama	Mobile Civic Center	Jesse Jammes vs. David Haskins
18	May 31, 1997	Evansville, Indiana	Roberts Municipal Stadium	Tony Williams vs. Scott Taylor
19	June 7, 1997	Huntington, West Virginia	Huntington Civic Center	Blackjack Bradshaw vs. Philip LaFon
20	June 14, 1997	Hartford, Connecticut	Hartford Civic Center	Scott Taylor vs. Steve Ramsey
21	June 21, 1997	Lake Placid, New York	Olympic Center	The Nation of Domination (Ahmed Johnson, Farooq and Kama Mustafa) vs. Jeff Libolt, Mike Bell and Tony DeVito
22	June 28, 1997	Detroit, Michigan	Cobo Arena	Owen Hart (c) vs. Goldust for the WWF Intercontinental Championship
23	July 5, 1997	Des Moines, Iowa	Veterans Memorial Coliseum	Savio Vega vs. Flash Funk
24	July 12, 1997	Edmonton, Alberta	Northlands Coliseum	Owen Hart vs. Flash Funk
25	July 19, 1997	San Antonio, Texas	Freeman Coliseum	The New Blackjacks (Blackjack Bradshaw and Blackjack Windham) vs. Jim Johnson and Kit Carson
26	July 26, 1997	Halifax, Nova Scotia	Metro Centre	The Headbangers (Mosh and Thrasher) vs. Scott D'Amore and Tony Roy
27	August 2, 1997	Pittsburgh, Pennsylvania	Pittsburgh Civic Arena	Owen Hart and The British Bulldog vs. The New Blackjacks (Blackjack Bradshaw and Blackjack Windham)
28	August 9, 1997	Bethlehem, Pennsylvania	Stabler Arena	Tiger Ali Singh (w/ The Iron Sheik and Tiger Jeet Singh) vs. Bob Holly
29	August 16, 1997	Biloxi, Mississippi		Vader vs. Hunter Hearst Helmsley
30	August 23, 1997	Atlantic City, New Jersey	Atlantic City Convention Center	The Headbangers (Mosh and Thrasher) vs. Rockabilly and Salvatore Sincere
31	August 31, 1997	Rosemont, Illinois	Rosemont Horizon	Tiger Ali Singh (w/ The Iron Sheik and Tiger Jeet Singh) vs. Adam O'Brien
32	September 6, 1997	Rosemont, Illinois	Rosemont Horizon	Savio Vega vs. D-Lo Brown
33	September 9, 1997	Muncie, Indiana	Worthen Arena	Jesse Jammes and Rockabilly vs. Los Boricuas (Jesus Castillo and Jose Estrada)
34	September 13, 1997	Cincinnati, Ohio	Cincinnati Gardens	El Torito vs. Little Lucky
35	September 27, 1997	New York City	Madison Square Garden	Los Boricuas (Miguel Perez Jr. and Savio Vega) vs. The New Blackjacks (Blackjack Bradshaw and Blackjack Windham)
36	October 4, 1997	Albany, New York	Pepsi Arena	Brian Pillman vs. The Patriot
37	October 11, 1997	Kansas City, Missouri	Kemper Arena	Dude Love vs. Jose Estrada
38	October 18, 1997	Topeka, Kansas	Landon Arena	Dude Love vs. The Sultan
39	October 25, 1997	Oklahoma City, Oklahoma	Myriad Convention Center	Jim Neidhart and The British Bulldog vs. Goldust and The Patriot
40	November 1, 1997	Tulsa, Oklahoma	Tulsa Convention Center	Scott Taylor and Taka Michinoku vs. Brian Christopher and Yoshihiro Tajiri
41	November 8, 1997	Hershey, Pennsylvania	Hersheypark Arena	Scott Taylor and Taka Michinoku vs. El Mosco and Pantera
42	November 15, 1997	Ottawa, Ontario	Corel Centre	Doug Furnas and Philip LaFon vs. Flash Funk and Scott Taylor
43	November 22, 1997	Cornwall, Ontario	Cornwall Civic Complex	The Disciples of Apocalypse (8-Ball, Chainz, Crush and Skull) vs. Los Boricuas (Jesus Castillo, Jose Estrada, Miguel Perez Jr. and Savio Vega)
44	November 29, 1997	Fayetteville, North Carolina	Cumberland County Civic Center	The Nation of Domination (D-Lo Brown and Kama Mustafa) w/ Farooq and The Rock vs. The Headbangers (Mosh and Thrasher)
45	December 6, 1997	Roanoke, Virginia	Roanoke Civic Center	Aguila and Brian Christopher vs. Flash Flanagan and Taka Michinoku
46	December 13, 1997	Portland, Maine	Portland Civic Center	Doug Furnas and Philip LaFon vs. The Hardy Boyz (Jeff Hardy and Matt Hardy)
47	December 20, 1997	Durham, New Hampshire	Whittemore Center Arena	Doug Furnas and Philip LaFon vs. Flash Funk and Scott Taylor
48	December 27, 1997	Lowell, Massachusetts	Lowell Memorial Auditorium	Tom Brandi vs. Barry Houston

== 1998 ==
No.	Date	Location	Venue	Main event
49	January 3, 1998	Uniondale, New York	Nassau Coliseum	Jeff Jarrett vs. Scott Taylor
50	January 10, 1998	New Haven, Connecticut	New Haven Coliseum	Taka Michinoku vs. Pablo Marquez
51	January 17, 1998	State College, Pennsylvania	Bryce Jordan Center	Tom Brandi vs. Jimmy Cicero
52	January 24, 1998	Fresno, California	Selland Arena	El Pantera vs. Chilango
53	January 31, 1998	Davis, California	Davis Recreation Hall	Scott Taylor vs. The Black Phantom
54	February 2, 1998	Indianapolis, Indiana	Market Square Arena	Los Boricuas (Jose Estrada and Miguel Perez Jr.) vs The Quebecers (Jacques and Pierre)
55	February 14, 1998	Evansville, Indiana	Roberts Municipal Stadium	The Disciples of Apocalypse (8-Ball and Skull) vs. The Rock 'n' Roll Express (Ricky Morton and Robert Gibson)
56	February 21, 1998	Dallas, Texas	Reunion Arena	The Disciples of Apocalypse (8-Ball, Chainz and Skull) vs. Los Boricuas (Jose Estrada and Savio Vega)
57	February 28, 1998	Waco, Texas	Heart of Texas Coliseum	The Disciples of Apocalypse (8-Ball and Skull) vs. The Quebecers (Jacques and Pierre)
58	March 7, 1998	Wheeling, West Virginia	Wheeling Civic Center	The Disciples of Apocalypse (8-Ball and Skull) vs. Los Boricuas (Jose Estrada and Miguel Perez Jr.) vs. Los Boricuas (Miguel Perez Jr. and Savio Vega) vs. The Truth Commission (Recon and Sniper)
59	March 21, 1998	Tucson, Arizona	Tucson Convention Center	The Headbangers (Mosh and Thrasher) vs. Los Boricuas (Miguel Perez Jr. and Savio Vega)
60	April 4, 1998	Albany, New York	Pepsi Arena	Armageddon (Buchanan and Poirier) vs. Dave Webber and Nick Barberry
61	April 11, 1998	Syracuse, New York	On Center	LOD 2000 (Road Warrior Animal and Road Warrior Hawk) w/ Sunny vs. Frank Stalletto and Roy Raymond
62	April 18, 1998	Philadelphia, Pennsylvania	CoreStates Center	Bradshaw vs. Harley Lewis
63	April 25, 1998	Uniondale, New York	Nassau Coliseum	The Quebecers (Jacques and Pierre) vs. Armageddon (Buchanan and Poirier)
64	May 2, 1998	Hampton, Virginia	Hampton Coliseum	LOD 2000 (Road Warrior Animal and Road Warrior Hawk) w/ Sunny vs. Los Boricuas (Jesus Castillo and Jose Estrada)
65	May 9, 1998	Richmond, Virginia	Richmond Coliseum	Papi Chulo vs. Scott Taylor (w/ Brian Christopher)
66	May 16, 1998	Baltimore, Maryland	Baltimore Arena	The Midnight Express (Bodacious Bart and Bombastic Bob) vs. The Rock 'n' Roll Express (Ricky Morton and Robert Gibson)
67	May 23, 1998	Nashville, Tennessee	Nashville Arena	Brian Christopher vs. David Jericho
68	May 30, 1998	Chattanooga, Tennessee	UTC Arena	Too Much (Brian Christopher and Scott Taylor) vs. David Jericho and Papi Chulo
69	June 6, 1998	Chicago, Illinois	Rosemont Horizon	Too Much (Brian Christopher and Scott Taylor) vs. The Headbangers (Mosh and Thrasher)
70	June 13, 1998	Rockford, Illinois	Metro Center	Kurrgan (w/ Golga, Luna and The Jackyl) vs. Kevin Flynn
71	June 20, 1998	San Antonio, Texas	Freeman Coliseum	The Oddities (Golga and Kurrgan) vs. Chris Young and Joe White
72	June 27, 1998	Austin, Texas	Frank Erwin Center	Darren Drozdov vs Shawn Stevens
73	July 4, 1998	Cleveland, Ohio	Gund Arena	Farooq vs. Lou Marconi
74	July 11, 1998	State College, Pennsylvania	Bryce Jordan Center	Dan Severn vs. GI Will
75	July 18, 1998	East Rutherford, New Jersey	Continental Airlines Arena	Dustin Runnells vs. Jeff Jarrett (w/ Tennessee Lee)
76	July 25, 1998	Binghamton, New York	Broome County Arena	The Headbangers (Mosh and Thrasher) vs. The Oddities (Golga and Kurrgan)
77	August 1, 1998	Anaheim, California	Arrowhead Pond	Marc Mero (w/ Jacqueline) vs. Dustin Runnels
78	August 8, 1998	San Diego, California	Sports Arena	Pierre vs. Edge
79	August 15, 1998	Omaha, Nebraska	Civic Auditorium	Farooq and Scorpio vs. The Headbangers (Mosh and Thrasher)
80	August 22, 1998	Des Moines, Iowa	Des Moines Veterans Memorial Coliseum	Edge vs. Papi Chula
81	August 29, 1998	Philadelphia, Pennsylvania	CoreStates Center	The Disciples of Apocalypse (8-Ball and Skull) vs. Ace Darling and Devon Storm
82	September 5, 1998	New Haven, Connecticut	New Haven Coliseum	Dustin Runnells vs. Lance Diamond
83	September 12, 1998	Lowell, Massachusetts	Tsongas Arena	Kurrgan vs Eric Sbracchia
84	September 19, 1998	Sacramento, California	Arco Arena	Too Much (Brian Christopher and Scott Taylor) vs. Christopher Daniels and The Suicide Kid
85	October 3, 1998	Detroit, Michigan	Joe Louis Arena	Jacqueline (c) vs. Starla Saxton for the WWF Women's Championship
86	October 10, 1998	Detroit, Michigan	Joe Louis Arena	The Hardy Boyz (Jeff Hardy and Matt Hardy) vs. Too Much (Brian Christopher and Scott Taylor)
87	October 17, 1998	Long Island, New York	Nassau Coliseum	The Headbangers (Mosh and Thrasher) vs. The Hardy Boyz (Jeff Hardy and Matt Hardy)
88	October 24, 1998	Milwaukee, Wisconsin	Bradley Center	Gangrel vs. Scorpio
89	October 31, 1998	Madison, Wisconsin	Kohl Center	Mark Henry vs. Scotty Zappa
90	November 7, 1998	Austin, Texas	Frank Erwin Center	The Headbangers (Mosh and Thrasher) vs. Too Much (Brian Christopher and Scott Taylor)
91	November 14, 1998	Dallas, Texas	Reunion Arena	Droz (w/ Road Warrior Animal) vs Jeff Jarrett (w/ Debra)
92	November 21, 1998	Lexington, Kentucky	Rupp Arena	The JOB Squad (Bob Holly and Scorpio) vs. Too Much (Brian Christopher and Scott Taylor)
93	November 28, 1998	Columbus, Ohio	Schottenstein Center	The Hardy Boyz (Jeff Hardy and Matt Hardy) vs. Reno Riggins and Steven Dunn
94	December 12, 1998	New Haven, Connecticut	New Haven Coliseum	Droz vs. The Godfather
95	December 19, 1998	Tacoma, Washington	Tacoma Dome	The JOB Squad (Gillberg and The Blue Meanie) vs The Acolytes (Bradshaw and Farooq)
96	December 26, 1998	Spokane, Washington	Spokane Arena	Brian Christopher and Kevin Quinn vs. The Disciples of Apocalypse (8-Ball and Skull)

== 1999 ==
No.	Date	Location	Venue	Main event
97	January 2, 1999	Albany, New York	Pepsi Arena	The JOB Squad (Bob Holly and Scorpio) vs. LOD 2000 (Animal and Droz) vs. The Acolytes (Bradshaw and Farooq) vs. The Disciples of Apocalypse (8-Ball and Skull)
98	January 9, 1999	Worcester, Massachusetts	Worcester Centrum	Gangrel vs. Mike Hollow
99	January 16, 1999	San Antonio, Texas	Freeman Coliseum	Test vs. Matt Hardy
100	January 23, 1999	Houston, Texas	Compaq Center	The Disciples of Apocalypse (8-Ball and Skull) vs. The Oddities (Golga and Kurrgan) vs. Too Much (Brian Christopher and Scott Taylor)
101	January 30, 1999	Phoenix, Arizona	America West Arena	The Disciples of Apocalypse (8-Ball and Skull) vs. The JOB Squad (Bob Holly and Scorpio)
102	February 6, 1999	Tucson, Arizona	Tucson Convention Center	Steve Blackman vs. Tiger Ali Singh
103	February 20, 1999	Birmingham, Alabama	Birmingham-Jefferson Convention Complex	Viscera vs. Tiger Ali Singh
104	February 27, 1999	Chattanooga, Tennessee	UTC Arena	Tiger Ali Singh vs. Mark Kyle
105	March 6, 1999	Dayton, Ohio	Nutter Center	Hardcore Holly (c) vs. Flash Flanagan for the WWF Hardcore Championship
106	March 13, 1999	Cleveland, Ohio	Gund Arena	Viscera vs. Tiger Ali Singh
107	March 20, 1999	Bakersfield, California	Centennial Garden Arena	D-Generation X (Triple H and X-Pac) vs. The Disciples of Apocalypse (8-Ball and Skull)
108	March 27, 1999	Albany, New York	Knickerbocker Arena	The Godfather vs JR Ryder
109	April 3, 1999	East Rutherford, New Jersey	Continental Airlines Arena	Tiger Ali Singh vs. Lance Diamond
110	April 10, 1999	Long Island, New York	Nassau Coliseum	Steve Williams vs. Tiger Ali Singh
111	April 17, 1999	East Lansing, Michigan	Breslin Center	Val Venis vs. Joe E. Legend
112	April 24, 1999	Detroit, Michigan	Joe Louis Arena	Tiger Ali Singh vs. Scotty Zappa
113	May 1, 1999	Hartford, Connecticut	Hartford Civic Center	Test vs. The Inferno Kid
114	May 8, 1999	New Haven, Connecticut	New Haven Coliseum	The Hardy Boyz (Jeff Hardy and Matt Hardy) vs. Julio Sanchez and Russ Greenberg
115	May 15, 1999	Jacksonville, Florida	Jacksonville Coliseum	Edge vs. Jeff Jarrett
116	May 29, 1999	St. Louis, Missouri	Kiel Center	Christian vs. Doug Basham
117	June 5, 1999	Moline, Illinois	Mark of the Quad	D-Lo Brown and Mark Henry vs. Droz and Prince Albert
118	June 12, 1999	Long Island, New York	Nassau Coliseum	Al Snow vs. Prince Albert
119	June 19, 1999	Boston, Massachusetts	FleetCenter	The Road Dogg vs. Meat
120	June 26, 1999	Memphis, Tennessee	Pyramid Arena	Jeff Jarrett (c) vs. Al Snow for the WWF Intercontinental Championship
121	July 3, 1999	Charlotte, North Carolina	Charlotte Coliseum	Al Snow vs The Brooklyn Brawler
122	July 10, 1999	Charlotte, North Carolina	Charlotte Coliseum	Chaz (w/ Marianna) vs Donnie Parker
123	July 24, 1999	Louisville, Kentucky	Louisville Gardens	Chaz vs. Tracy Smothers
124	July 31, 1999	Cleveland, Ohio	Gund Arena	Joey Abs (w/ Rodney) defeated Meat (w/ Jacqueline)
125	August 7, 1999	Columbus, Ohio	Schottenstein Center	Joey Abs vs. Johnny Paradise
126	August 14, 1999	Detroit, Michigan	Joe Louis Arena	Steve Blackman vs. The Striker
127	August 21, 1999	Rosemont, Illinois	Allstate Arena	D-Lo Brown (c) vs. Prince Albert for the WWF Intercontinental and WWF European Championships

== See also ==
- List of AEW Dynamite episodes
- List of WWE Raw special episodes
- List of WWE SmackDown special episodes
