= Unlucky Lottery =

Extreme Championship Wrestling 1996 live event

- Promotion: Extreme Championship Wrestling
- Date: September 13, 1996
- City: Jim Thorpe, Pennsylvania, US
- Venue: The Flagstaff
- Attendance: c. 400

Event chronology
← Previous; Natural Born Killaz	Next → When Worlds Collide

Unlucky Lottery was a professional wrestling live event produced by Extreme Championship Wrestling (ECW) on September 13, 1996, the night prior to When Worlds Collide. The event was held at The Flagstaff in Jim Thorpe, Pennsylvania in the United States. A recording of the event filmed by Gabe Sapolsky was released on DVD.

== Event ==
The event was attended by approximately 400 people. The referees for the event were Jim Molineaux, John Finnegan, and John Moore.

The opening bout was a tag team match pitting the Bad Crew against Buh Buh Ray Dudley and Hack Meyers. Dudley and Meyers won the match, simultaneously pinning both members of the Bad Crew.

The second bout was a singles match between Johnny Smith and Super Nova. Smith won the bout by pinfall using a Tiger Driver.

The third bout was a submission match between Little Guido and Taz. Taz won the bout by submission using the Tazmission.

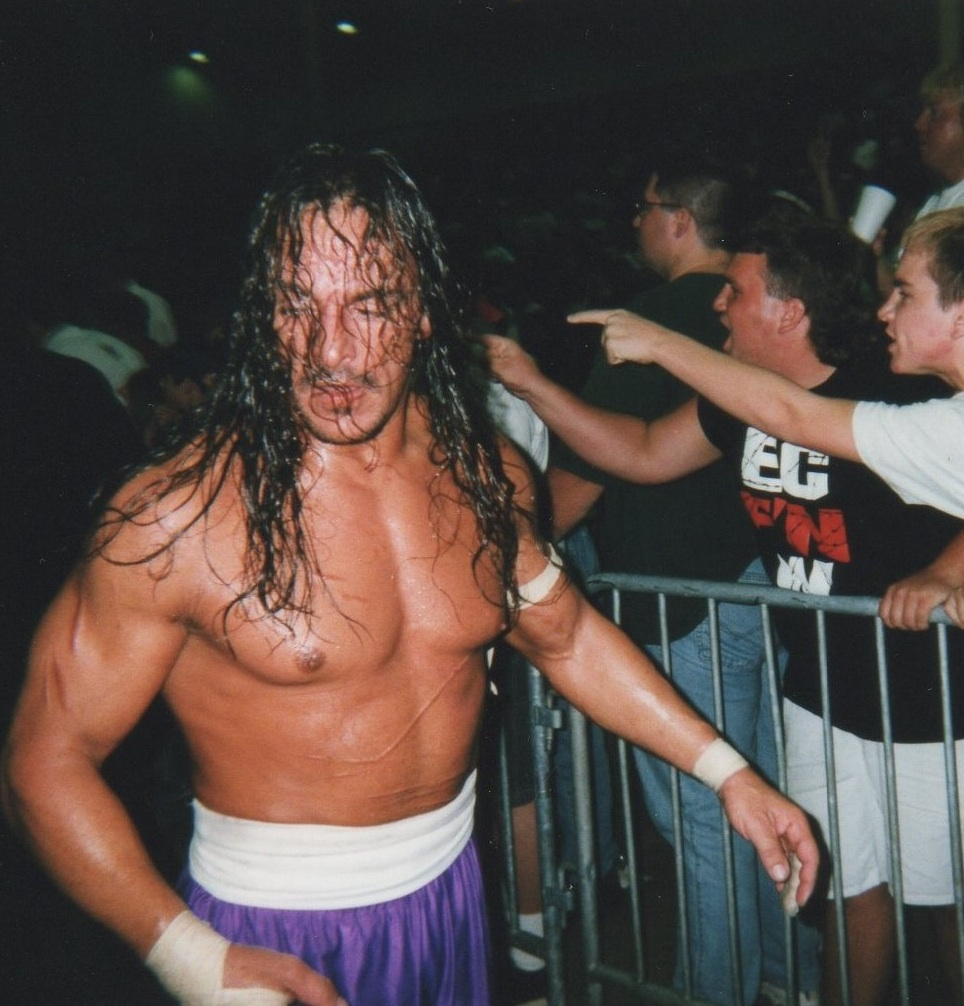
Sabu defeated Rob Van Dam in the main event of Unlucky Lottery, marking the end of their lengthy feud.

The fourth bout was a tag team match pitting the Can-Am Express against Louie Spicolli and Mikey Whipwreck. The bout was won by The Can-Am Express when Phil Lafon pinned Spicolli following a cobra clutch suplex.

The fifth bout was a singles match between Devon Storm and Steve Williams. Williams won the bout by pinning Storm following an Oklahoma Stampede. Following the match, the Eliminators attacked Williams until Tommy Dreamer came to the ring and drove them off.

The sixth bout was ECW World Tag Team Champions the Gangstas defend their titles against Shane Douglas (the then-ECW Television Champion) and a mystery partner, who was revealed to be Sammy the Silk. The bout was won by the Gangstas, with New Jack pinning Silk following a chair shot from the top rope. Following the match, Douglas attacked Silk.

The seventh bout was a singles match between Perry Saturn and Pitbull #2. The bout was won by Pitbull #2, who pinned Saturn using a schoolboy.

The eighth bout was a falls count anywhere tag team match pitting Brian Lee and Raven against the Sandman and Tommy Dreamer. Raven and Lee were accompanied to the ring by The Sandman's estranged wife Lori and son Tyler, who had become followers of Raven. Towards the end of the match, The Sandman attempted to hit Raven with a Singapore cane, only for Raven to pull Tyler in front of him as a human shield. Dreamer and The Sandman went on to win the match when The Sandman pinned Raven following a DDT.

The main event was a singles match between Rob Van Dam and Sabu, marking the final match of their feud. Sabu won the match by pinfall following a triple jump moonsault. Following the match, as Sabu and Van Dam went to shake hands, they were attacked by the Can-Am Express, their opponents for the following night at When Worlds Collide.

== Results ==
No.	Results	Stipulations
1	Buh Buh Ray Dudley and Hack Meyers (with Sign Guy Dudley) defeated the Bad Crew (Dog and Rose) by pinfall	Tag team match
2	Johnny Smith defeated Super Nova (with The Blue Meanie and Stevie Richards) by pinfall	Singles match
3	Taz (with Bill Alfonso) defeated Little Guido (with J.T. Smith and Sal Bellomo) by submission	Submission match
4	The Can-Am Express (Doug Furnas and Phil Lafon) defeated Louie Spicolli and Mikey Whipwreck by pinfall	Tag team match
5	Steve Williams defeated Devon Storm by pinfall	Singles match
6	The Gangstas (Mustafa and New Jack) defeated Sammy the Silk and Shane Douglas (with Francine) by pinfall	Tag team match for the ECW World Tag Team Championship
7	Pitbull #2 (with Pitbull #1) defeated Perry Saturn by pinfall	Singles match
8	The Sandman and Tommy Dreamer (with Beulah McGillicutty) defeated Brian Lee and Raven (with The Blue Meanie, Lori Fullington, Stevie Richards, Super Nova, and Tyler Fullington) by pinfall	Falls count anywhere tag team match
9	Sabu defeated Rob Van Dam by pinfall	Singles match
