= ECW When Worlds Collide =

Extreme Championship Wrestling live event

When Worlds Collide was the name of two professional wrestling live events produced by the professional wrestling promotion Eastern Championship Wrestling/Extreme Championship Wrestling (ECW) in 1994 and 1996 respectively. Both events were held in the ECW Arena in Philadelphia, Pennsylvania in the United States.

== 1994 ==
When Worlds Collide
- The ECW Arena
- Promotion: Eastern Championship Wrestling
- Date: May 14, 1994
- City: Philadelphia, Pennsylvania, US
- Venue: ECW Arena
- Attendance: 1,558

Event chronology
← Previous; Ultimate Jeopardy	Next → Hostile City Showdown

ECW When Worlds Collide chronology
← Previous; First	Next → 1996

When Worlds Collide was produced by Eastern Championship Wrestling (ECW) on May 14, 1994. The event was held in the ECW Arena in Philadelphia, Pennsylvania in the United States.

Excerpts from When Worlds Collide aired on the syndicated television show ECW Hardcore TV, while the full event was released on VHS in 1994. It was made available for streaming on the WWE Network in 2020. The main event, a tag team match pitting Arn Anderson and Terry Funk against Bobby Eaton and Sabu, was included on the compilation DVD ECW: Unreleased Vol. 2 released by WWE in 2013.

The title of "When Worlds Collide" referred to the involvement of World Championship Wrestling wrestlers in the main event. The main event of When Worlds Collide came about after World Championship Wrestling approached ECW about cross-promoting its pay-per-view Slamboree '94: A Legends' Reunion, which was scheduled to take place in Philadelphia on May 22, 1994. The two promotions agreed to a talent exchange in which WCW wrestlers Arn Anderson and Bobby Eaton would appear at When Worlds Collide, while Terry Funk and other ECW wrestlers would appear on WCW television. ECW later sued World Championship Wrestling for copyright infringement in 1994 after they announced an event also titled "When Worlds Collide". The case was settled out of court. As part of the settlement, WCW agreed to supply three of its contracted wrestlers for an ECW event on November 18, 1994: Kevin Sullivan, Sherri Martel, and Steve Austin (later replaced by Brian Pillman). When Worlds Collide later inspired the naming of a series of WWE events, WWE Worlds Collide, and a series of New Japan Pro-Wrestling events, CEO×NJPW: When Worlds Collide.

When Worlds Collide introduced the "Singapore cane" as a recurring weapon in professional wrestling, drawing upon the controversy resulting from the caning of American citizen Michael P. Fay in Singapore on May 5, 1994.

=== Event ===
Other on-screen personnel
Role	Name
Commentator	Joey Styles
Ring announcer	Bob Artese
Referees	John Finegan
Referees	Jim Molineaux
Referees	John "Pee Wee" Moore

The event was attended by 1,558 people, representing ECW's then-largest audience.

The Sandman adopted the Singapore cane as his signature weapon at When Worlds Collide.

The opening bout was a singles match between Rockin' Rebel and Tommy Dreamer. During the match, Dreamer took a frying pan from a member of the audience and used it as a weapon, starting the tradition of ECW wrestlers using weapons given to them by the audience. Dreamer won the match by pinfall using a Thesz Press after interference from Rockin' Rebel's manager Jason backfired.

In the second match, Mikey Whipwreck defended his ECW Television Championship - which he had won the prior day - against 911. The much larger 911 quickly overpowered Whipwreck with a chokeslam, but instead of pinning him lifted him and chokeslammed him twice more. After referee John "Pee Wee" Moore remonstrated with him, 911 chokeslammed both Whipwreck and Moore simultaneously, drawing a disqualification. After the match, 911 chokeslammed Moore twice more.

The third match was a singles bout between Jimmy Snuka and Kevin Sullivan in what was billed as a "battle of legends". Sullivan was accompanied to ringside by his wife, Woman; during the match, Woman left ringside with the Sandman, revealing herself as his new manager. Snuka's manager Hunter Q. Robbins III then tripped a distracted Sullivan and held down his legs, enabling Snuka to pin him. After the match, Sullivan attacked Robbins, then threatened photographers at ringside. This was Sullivan's final match with ECW for six months, as he returned to WCW full-time.

The fourth match was a Singapore canes tag team match pitting Tommy Cairo and the Sandman's estranged wife Peaches against the Sandman and a partner of his choosing, with the stipulation that the loser would receive six lashes from the Singapore cane (in reference to the caning of Michael P. Fay). The match came about after a temporarily blinded Sandman accidentally hit Peaches during a match with Cairo, leading to her leaving him and siding with Cairo. The Sandman introduced Woman as his partner for the match. The match ended when Peaches pinned the Sandman following a DDT by Cairo. After the match, Peaches caned the Sandman until Woman threw salt in her eyes. The Sandman and Woman then caned Cairo and Peaches. This match established the Singapore cane as the Sandman's signature weapon, and he began carrying a Singapore cane to the ring for the rest of his career.

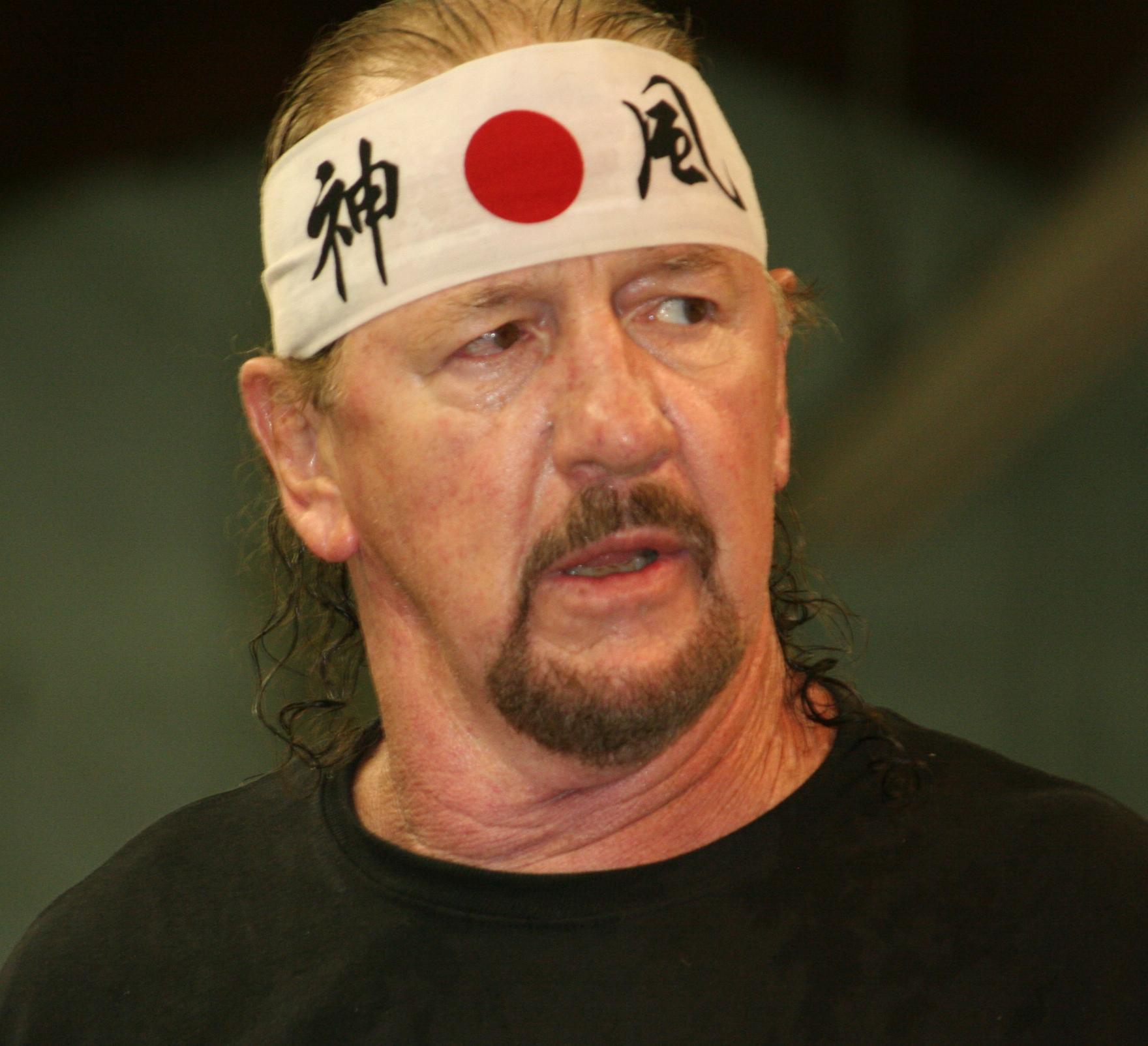
Terry Funk wrestled in the main event of When Worlds Collide.

The fifth match was a singles match between the Pitbull and the Tazmaniac which resulted from the Tazmaniac costing the Pitbull his ECW Television Championship the previous day. Before the match began, 911 came to the ring and chokeslammed the referee, John Moore, twice more. Moore was replaced as referee by John Finnegan. The Pitbull won by pinfall after wrapping his fist with a steel chain and punching the Tazmaniac.

The penultimate match was a four-on-three handicap elimination match pitting the Bruise Brothers and J.T. Smith against Mr. Hughes, ECW Heavyweight Champion Shane Douglas, and the Public Enemy (Road Warrior Hawk was scheduled to team with the Bruise Brothers and Smith, but had to withdraw from the event due to a lingering knee injury). The Bruise Brothers, Mr. Hughes, and Shane Douglas were all eliminated from the match by countout after brawling into the audience, leaving J.T. Smith alone against the Public Enemy. Smith went on to win the match by pinning Rocco Rock and Johnny Grunge with roll-ups in quick succession.

The main event was a tag team match pitting Arn Anderson and Terry Funk against Bobby Eaton and Sabu in a continuation of the feud between Funk and Sabu. During the match, the Public Enemy attacked Funk, hitting him in the leg with a 2×4. Towards the end of the match, Funk attempted to hit Sabu with a steel chair, but instead accidentally hit Anderson, causing Anderson himself to take the chair and hit Funk in the leg in retaliation. Sabu then applied a single leg crab to Funk's injured leg, forcing him to submit.

After the main event, Paul E. Dangerously gave money to the Public Enemy for attacking Funk, then cut a promo praising Funk's grit. Funk gave a promo of his own in which he pledged to bring his brother Dory Funk Jr. to ECW as backup, setting up a tag team bout pitting the Funk Brothers against the Public Enemy for Hostile City Showdown the following month.

=== Results ===
No.	Results	Stipulations	Times
1	Tommy Dreamer defeated Rockin' Rebel (with Jason)	Singles match	6:21
2	Mikey Whipwreck (c) defeated 911 (with Paul E. Dangerously) by disqualification	Singles match for the ECW Television Championship	1:42
3	Jimmy Snuka (with Hunter Q. Robbins III) defeated Kevin Sullivan (with Woman)	Singles match	4:30
4	Peaches and Tommy Cairo defeated the Sandman and Woman	Singapore canes tag team match	4:55
5	The Pitbull (with Jason) defeated the Tazmaniac	Singles match	8:45
6	The Bruise Brothers (Don Bruise and Ron Bruise) and J.T. Smith defeated Mr. Hughes, Shane Douglas, and the Public Enemy (Johnny Grunge and Rocco Rock)	Four-on-three handicap elimination match	24:52
7	Bobby Eaton and Sabu (with 911 and Paul E. Dangerously) defeated Arn Anderson and Terry Funk by submission	Tag team match	19:35
(c) / – the champion(s) heading into the match

== 1996 ==
When Worlds Collide
- The ECW Arena
- Promotion: Extreme Championship Wrestling
- Date: September 14, 1996 (aired September 17, September 24, and October 1, 1996)
- City: Philadelphia, Pennsylvania, US
- Venue: ECW Arena
- Attendance: c. 1,250

Event chronology
← Previous; Unlucky Lottery	Next → Ultimate Jeopardy

ECW When Worlds Collide chronology
← Previous; 1994	Next → Last

The second When Worlds Collide event (sometimes referred to as When Worlds Collide II) was produced by Extreme Championship Wrestling (ECW) on September 14, 1996, the night after Unlucky Lottery. The event was held in the ECW Arena in Philadelphia, Pennsylvania in the United States.

Excerpts from When Worlds Collide aired on episodes #178, #179, and #180 of the syndicated television show ECW Hardcore TV on September 17, September 24, and October 1, 1996.

=== Event ===
The second When Worlds Collide event was attended by approximately 1,250 people. The commentator was Joey Styles. The referees were Jim Molineaux and Paul Richards. The ring announcer was Bob Artese.

In the opening match, ECW World Tag Team Champions the Gangstas defended their titles in a three-on-two handicap match against J.T. Smith, Little Guido, and Sal Bellomo of the Full Blooded Italians (FBI). The Gangstas won a short bout when New Jack pinned Bellomo following a running powerslam from Mustafa and a 187 from New Jack.

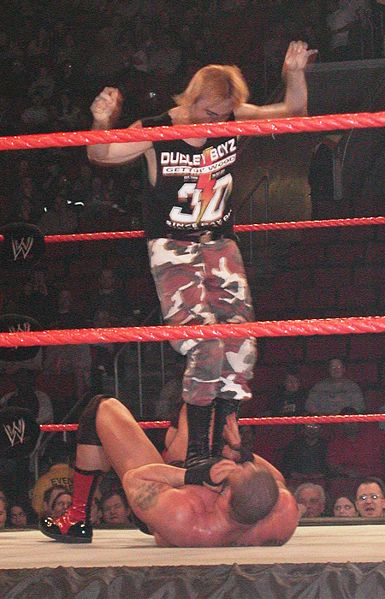
Spike Dudley debuted in ECW at When Worlds Collide.

Immediately after winning the match, the Gangstas defended the ECW World Tag Team Championship in a second three-on-two handicap match, this time against Stevie Richards, Super Nova, and the Blue Meanie, who were billed as "The Stamford Hillbillies"; they came to the ring wearing overalls and carrying a jug of moonshine and a bucket of "slop" to the accompaniment of "All My Rowdy Friends Are Coming Over Tonight" by Hank Williams Jr., then square danced in the ring. The Gangstas defeated their opponents in a squash when New Jack pinned the Blue Meanie following another 187. During the match, the Blue Meanie's valet Miss Patricia was "slopped" by The Gangstas; this marked her final appearance with ECW, with the "slopping" given as an explanation for her having departed.

The third bout was a singles match between Devon Storm and the Sandman. Despite attempted interference from the Bad Crew and Julio Caesar Valentino Alfonso, the Sandman won the bout by pinfall following a DDT.

The fourth bout was a singles match between Axl Rotten and Buh Buh Ray Dudley, with the stipulation that Rotten would face his tag team partner D-Von Dudley immediately afterward if he failed to defeat Dudley. Rotten won the bout by pinfall after D-Von Dudley gave Buh Buh Ray Dudley a chair shot. Following the match, Big Dick Dudley and the debuting Spike Dudley entered the ring and brawled with D-Von Dudley.

The fifth bout was a singles match between D-Von Dudley and Hack Meyers, with the other Dudleys announced as having been thrown out of the ECW Arena. Dudley won the bout by pinfall following another chairshot. After the match, D-Von Dudley and Axl Rotten attacked Meyers until being attacked by Mikey Whipwreck.

The sixth bout saw ECW World Television Champion Shane Douglas defend his title against Louie Spicolli. Douglas defeated Spicolli by pinfall using a belly-to-belly suplex to retain his title.

The seventh bout saw ECW World Heavyweight Champion Raven defend his title again Pitbull #2. During the match, Shane Douglas and his valet Francine attempted to interfere on Raven's behalf, but Francine accidentally threw powder in Douglas' eyes, causing him to mistakenly give a belly-to-belly suplex to Raven. An unnamed trainee of J.T. Smith also attempted to interfere in the match, but accidentally legitimately broke his own leg. Raven went on to win the bout by pinfall following an Evenflow DDT.

The eighth bout was a tag team match between the Can-Am Express and Rob Van Dam and Sabu. This was a "dream partners" match that arose after Van Dam defeated Doug Furnas in a singles match at Natural Born Killaz, with Furnas choosing his long-term tag team partner Dan Kroffat and Van Dam choosing his formal rival Sabu. Sabu and Van Dam had faced one another the prior evening at Unlucky Lottery, with the Can-Am Express attacking them afterwards. The match ended in a time limit draw after 30 minutes, with the bell ringing just as Furnas attempted to pin Van Dam. Following the match, Van Dam and Sabu suggested a five minute extension, but Furnas and Kroffat refused.

The penultimate match was a singles bout between Johnny Smith and Taz. Taz won the bout by submission using the Tazmission.

The main event was a six-man tag team match pitting Brian Lee and The Eliminators against the Miracle Violence Connection and Tommy Dreamer. The bout was won by Lee and the Eliminators, who pinned Terry Gordy after giving him Total Elimination.

=== Results ===
No.	Results	Stipulations	Times
1	The Gangstas (Mustafa and New Jack) (c) defeated the Full Blooded Italians (J.T. Smith and Little Guido) (with Sal Bellomo) by pinfall	Three-on-two handicap match for the ECW World Tag Team Championship	—
2	The Gangstas (Mustafa and New Jack) (c) defeated the Blue Meanie, Stevie Richards, and Super Nova (with Miss Patricia) by pinfall	Three-on-two handicap match for the ECW World Tag Team Championship	—
3	The Sandman defeated Devon Storm (with the Bad Crew and Julio Caesar Valentino Alfonso) by pinfall	Singles match	—
4	Axl Rotten (with D-Von Dudley) defeated Buh Buh Ray Dudley (with Chubby Dudley and Sign Guy Dudley) by pinfall	Singles match	—
5	D-Von Dudley defeated Hack Meyers by pinfall	Singles match	—
6	Shane Douglas (c) (with Francine) defeated Louie Spicolli by pinfall	Singles match for the ECW World Television Championship	19:22
7	Raven (c) (with the Blue Meanie, Lori Fullington, Stevie Richards, Super Nova, and Tyler Fullington) defeated Pitbull #2 (with Pitbull #1) by pinfall	Singles match for the ECW World Heavyweight Championship	—
8	The Can-Am Express (Dan Kroffat and Doug Furnas) vs. Rob Van Dam and Sabu ended in a time limit draw	Tag team match	30:00
9	Taz (with Bill Alfonso and Team Taz) defeated Johnny Smith via submission	Singles match	—
10	Brian Lee and the Eliminators (Kronus and Saturn) defeated the Miracle Violence Connection (Steve Williams and Terry Gordy) and Tommy Dreamer (with Beulah McGillicutty) by pinfall	Six-man tag team match	—
(c) / – the champion(s) heading into the match
