= In Your House 13: Final Four =

1997 World Wrestling Federation pay-per-view event

- Promotional poster featuring "Stone Cold" Steve Austin, Bret Hart, Sycho Sid, and Shawn Michaels
- Promotion: World Wrestling Federation
- Date: February 16, 1997
- City: Chattanooga, Tennessee
- Venue: UTC Arena
- Attendance: 6,399
- Buy rate: 141,000

Pay-per-view chronology
← Previous; Royal Rumble	Next → WrestleMania 13

In Your House chronology
← Previous; It's Time	Next → Revenge of the 'Taker

In Your House 13: Final Four was a 1997 professional wrestling pay-per-view (PPV) event produced by the World Wrestling Federation (WWF, renamed WWE in 2002) and presented by Western Union. It was the 13th In Your House and took place on February 16, 1997, at the UTC Arena in Chattanooga, Tennessee. The name of the show was in reference to the main event, which was a four corners elimination match.

Five matches were broadcast on the PPV portion, with one match held before the event as a dark match. The aforementioned main event was for the WWF Championship, which had been vacated by Shawn Michaels three days before the event. The match, which had originally been conceived to settle the controversy over the finish of the 1997 Royal Rumble match the prior month and name a number one contender for the championship at WrestleMania 13, featured Bret Hart, "Stone Cold" Steve Austin, The Undertaker, and Vader. The main matches on the undercard were Owen Hart and The British Bulldog versus Doug Furnas and Phil Lafon and Rocky Maivia versus Hunter Hearst Helmsley for the WWF Intercontinental Championship.

== Production ==
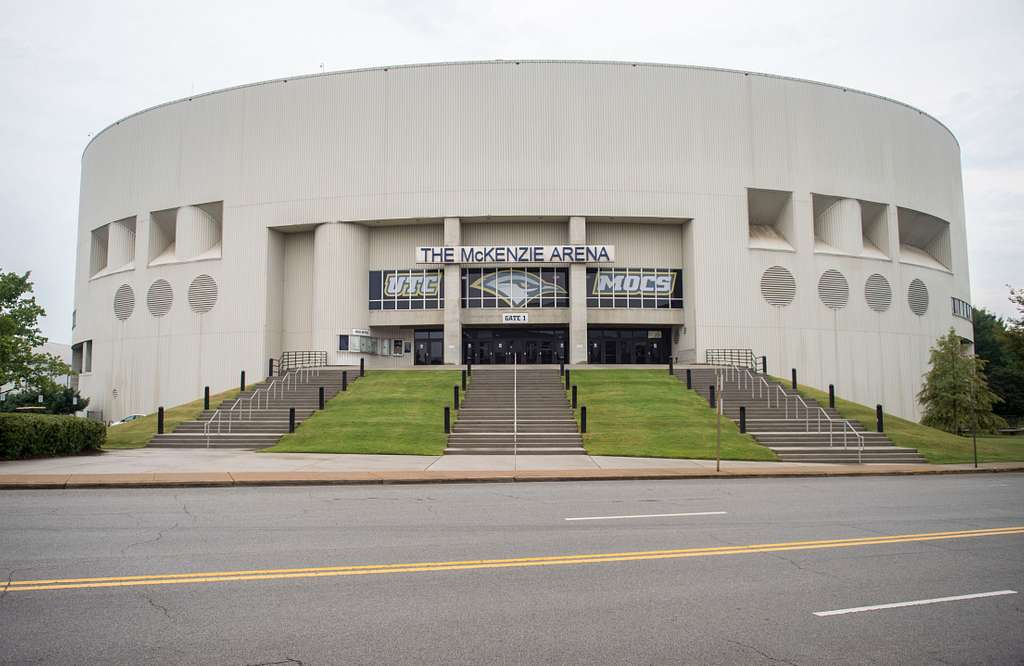
The 13th In Your House was held in Chattanooga, Tennessee at the UTC Arena (pictured as McKenzie Arena, renamed in 2000).

=== Background ===
In Your House was a series of monthly professional wrestling pay-per-view (PPV) events first produced by the World Wrestling Federation (WWF, renamed WWE in 2002) in May 1995. They aired when the promotion was not holding one of its then-five major PPVs (WrestleMania, King of the Ring, SummerSlam, Survivor Series, and Royal Rumble) and were sold at a lower cost. In Your House 13: Final Four was scheduled for February 16, 1997, at the UTC Arena in Chattanooga, Tennessee. The name of the show was based on the event's main event match, which was a four corners elimination match.

=== Storylines ===
==== Main event background ====
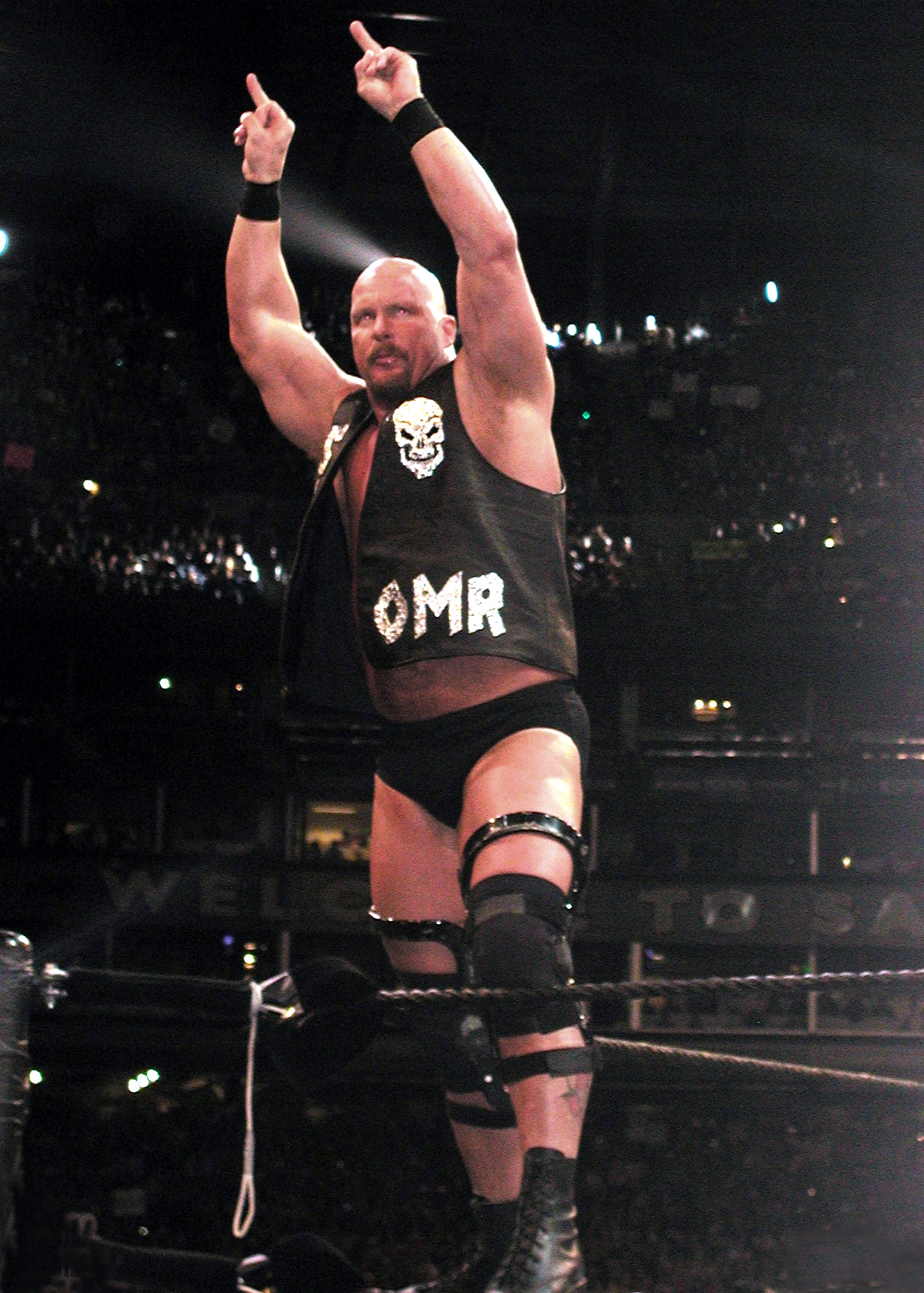
"Stone Cold" Steve Austin won the 1997 Royal Rumble, but due to controversy of the ending of that Royal Rumble match, he competed in the four corners elimination match at In Your House 13 for the vacant WWF Championship.

The main angle entering this edition of In Your House was the resolution to the Royal Rumble match from the previous pay-per-view. Officially, the match had been won by "Stone Cold" Steve Austin, but there was significant controversy surrounding the way Austin won the match.

Austin, who had been feuding with Bret Hart since the latter returned to the WWF at Survivor Series in November of the previous year, had actually been thrown over the top rope by Hart during the later stages of the match. Austin landed on the side of the ring where referee Mike Chioda was supposed to watch for eliminations. Chioda, however, was not there as he had gone to the other side of the ring to assist Jim Korderas, the other referee assigned to the match, break up a fight between Mankind and Terry Funk. Once Austin realized that nobody saw his elimination, he climbed back into the ring and eliminated The Undertaker, Vader, and an unsuspecting Hart, who was unaware Austin returned to the match. Austin's win, at least for the moment, earned him a shot at WWF Champion Shawn Michaels, who defeated Sycho Sid to regain the championship in the main event match immediately following the Royal Rumble.

The next night on Monday Night Raw, Hart came out unexpectedly at the start of the program and expressed his frustration over what he perceived as constant mistreatment since he had returned from his self-imposed exile following his loss to Michaels at WrestleMania XII. Hart specifically directed his attention to Vince McMahon at ringside as he was set to take his broadcast position. As far as Hart was concerned, since he had eliminated Diesel shortly after Undertaker and Vader were both taken out by Austin, he was the last legal man in the ring and therefore should be declared the winner and receive the WrestleMania title shot and rematch with Michaels. After McMahon refused to acknowledge him, Hart told the fans that he was quitting and left the ring.

A short time later, WWF President Gorilla Monsoon came out to clarify the situation. He confirmed Austin's victory in the Royal Rumble, citing the longstanding Federation policy of referees’ decisions being final. However, Austin's win did not mean he was guaranteed the title shot due to his actions in attaining the victory.

Instead, a match was conceived for the February event to settle the dispute. Austin, Undertaker, and Vader would compete in what was called the Final Four match, with the fourth spot in the match offered to Hart if he reconsidered his quitting earlier, which he did. The match would be conducted under elimination rules, with the last man standing advancing to WrestleMania to face the champion. However, an incident involving Michaels would lead to a significant change in plans for the pay-per-view.

As Bret Hart recalled, the plan was for him to face Michaels in a rematch of their classic at WrestleMania XII in 1996. In that match, Hart was supposed to defeat Michaels for the WWF Championship as a reward for agreeing to lose the year before. However, on a special Thursday edition of Raw that aired on February 13, 1997, Michaels announced that he was vacating the championship.

Several weeks earlier he had wrestled Hart and Sid and suffered a knee injury; Michaels revealed that doctors had told him that the damage was severe enough that he would likely have to retire from wrestling. He also said that he had “lost (his) smile” and needed to find it again, and thus he was walking away for a spell. Hart was said to be furious with the situation; he believed that Michaels was only doing this so he could get out of having to lose the belt to him as they had agreed upon and that the injury was not as bad as he was letting on.

Whatever his reasoning actually was, Michaels’ decision forced a change in plans. First, the Final Four match would now be contested for the vacant WWF Championship and Sid would remain the #1 contender for the title. Then, on the edition of Raw on February 17, the winner of the Final Four match would be obligated to make his first defense of the WWF Championship against Sid in the main event of the program.

==== Other feuds ====
The other major feuds heading into the pay-per-view event were between Rocky Maivia and Hunter Hearst Helmsley over the WWF Intercontinental Championship. On Thursday Raw Thursday, Maivia defeated Helmsley to win the Intercontinental title in an upset at the time, with Maivia scoring a small package on Helmsley culminating in a rematch for Maivia's newly won Intercontinental title, and Owen Hart and The British Bulldog against Doug Furnas and Phil LaFon over the WWF Tag Team Championship which began after Furnas and LaFon had eliminated Tag Champions from a Survivor Series match at Survivor Series 1996 to earn a title shot.

== Event ==
Other on-screen personnel
Role:	Name:
Commentator	Jim Ross
Commentator	Jerry Lawler
Commentator	Carlos Cabrera (Spanish)
Commentator	Hugo Savinovich (Spanish)
Commentator	Ray Rougeau (French)
Commentator	Jean Brassard (French)
Interviewer	Kevin Kelly
Interviewer	Dok Hendrix
Ring announcer	Howard Finkel
Referee	Tim White
Referee	Jack Doan
Referee	Earl Hebner
Referee	Mike Chioda

Before the event went live on pay-per-view, The Godwinns defeated The Headbangers in a dark match.

=== Preliminary matches ===
The first televised match was between Marc Mero and Leif Cassidy. Mero began with a quick assault on Cassidy before getting distracted by Sable. Cassidy regrouped and applied the figure four leglock on Mero and also argued with Sable, who was in Mero's corner. Mero tried to do quick attacks on Cassidy but Cassidy managed to be on the offensive. Sable continued to distract him throughout the match and Cassidy was frustrated of her interferences. He ran before her before Mero hit Cassidy with a Wild Thing for the win.

The second match was a six-man tag team match featuring Nation of Domination (Faarooq, Crush and Savio Vega) against Bart Gunn, Goldust and Flash Funk. All the six men began brawling with each other, until Nation were sent to the outside. As they regrouped, Funk dived from the top rope onto all the three members of Nation. Funk hit a hurricanrana on Vega from the top rope and tried to dive on the Nation again but they controlled his landing and dragged him into the ring. Faarooq, Crush and Vega took turns and attacked Funk. After a great damage, he was able to tag with Gunn who took care of all three men. Gunn, Goldust and Funk sent Nation outside the ring and Gunn hit a diving bulldog on Faarooq and went for the cover but the referee was distracted in sending Goldust and Funk to the outside. Crush took advantage and hit a leg drop on Gunn while Faarooq pinned Gunn to get the win.

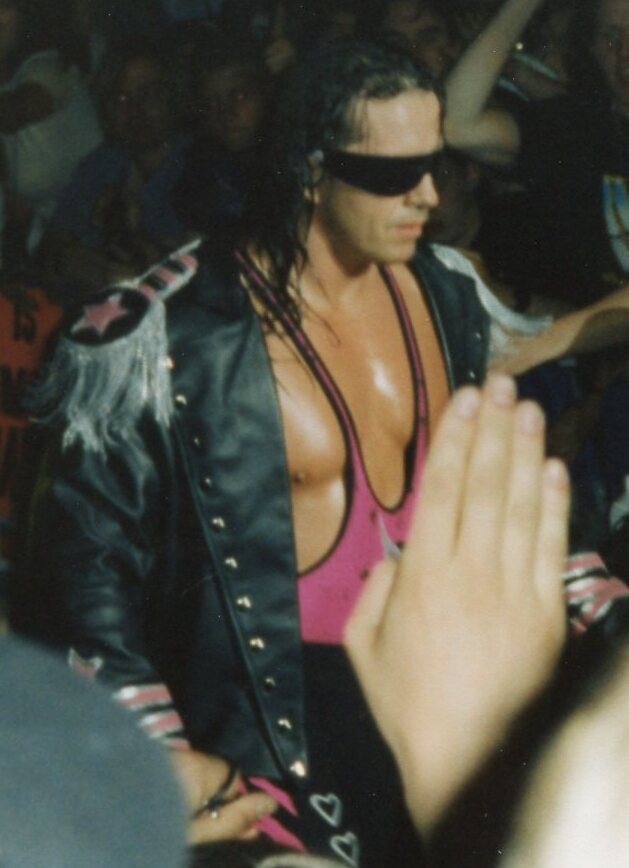
Bret Hart won the Four Corners Elimination match for the vacant WWF Championship

The third match was for the WWF Intercontinental Championship between champion Rocky Maivia and Hunter Hearst Helmsley. Helmsley gained the early advantage by performing backbreakers and suplexes on Maivia. Helmsley began applying submission holds on Maivia but Maivia countered them into a small package. Helmsley kicked out of the pin until Maivia hit a flying crossbody on Helmsley. He kicked out again and nailed Maivia with a jawbreaker and a DDT. Goldust came to the ringside and distracted Helmsley. Maivia hit a Bridging German suplex on Helmsley and pinned him to retain the IC title. Following the match, as Goldust confronted Helmsley, Marlena was assaulted and choked by a female fan at ringside, who was later identified as Helmsley's new bodyguard/enforcer, Chyna.

The fourth match was a tag team match pitting Doug Furnas and Phil LaFon against WWF Tag Team Champions Owen Hart and The British Bulldog for the WWF Tag Team Championship. Hart and Furnas started the match as Furnas hit Owen with a lariat and a leg drop. Furnas tagged in with LaFon while Owen tagged in with Bulldog. He overpowered LaFon and then Owen and Bulldog took turns by tagging with each other and attacking LaFon. Smith did a pinfall attempt on LaFon but the referee was distracted by Owen. Owen continued to distract the referee as accidentally hit Bulldog with a lariat. Bulldog hit Owen with a lariat and the two argued as LaFon hit a splash on Owen from the top rope but Bulldog controlled LaFon. Despite that, LaFon tagged in with Furnas and then the challengers double-teamed Hart until Hart tagged in with Bulldog. Bulldog picked up LaFon and went for a running powerslam until Hart hit LaFon with his Slammy statuette. LaFon and Furnas won the match by disqualification, but the title does not change hands by DQ, so the titles remained with Hart and Bulldog.

=== Main event ===
The main event was the Final Four match for the vacant WWF Championship between The Undertaker, Bret Hart, "Stone Cold" Steve Austin and Vader. As mentioned, this was a no-disqualification match. In order to be eliminated a wrestler could be pinned, forced to submit, or thrown over the top rope with both feet touching the floor. Hart and Austin, who had a well-known rivalry, started brawling with each other while Undertaker attacked Vader and hit him with a crossbody over the top rope. Undertaker attacked both Hart and Vader. Vader recovered and then hit Undertaker with a steel chair to the outside. Undertaker blocked the chair and drove Vader in the chair and then the steel steps opening up a cut above his right eye. Austin bumped Hart and then began working on Undertaker while Hart and Vader punched each other. All the four men began wrestling on outside as Undertaker crotched Austin. Vader attacked Hart with a steel chair. Undertaker began working on Hart, who eye raked Undertaker and was powerslammed by Undertaker. Vader and Austin attacked each other by hitting steel chairs, steps, bell and even a camera man. Vader applied Hart's own maneuver Sharpshooter on him, but Austin hit Vader with a Lou Thesz Press to break the hold. Vader tried to hit Undertaker with a Vaderbomb, but instead went a Vadersault which missed. Hart then put Austin in a fireman's carry and threw him over the top rope, which eliminated him from the match. Hart and Undertaker brawled with each other while Vader recovered in the corner. Paul Bearer interfered and attacked Undertaker while Vader was superplexed by Hart. Despite being eliminated, Austin interfered in the match and attacked Hart. Vader went for a Vaderbomb from the top rope, but Undertaker low blowed Vader and threw him over the top rope. Undertaker and Hart remained the final two participants. He tried to hit a "Tombstone" on Hart until Austin distracted Undertaker while Hart clotheslined Undertaker over the top rope to win his fourth WWF Championship.

== Aftermath ==
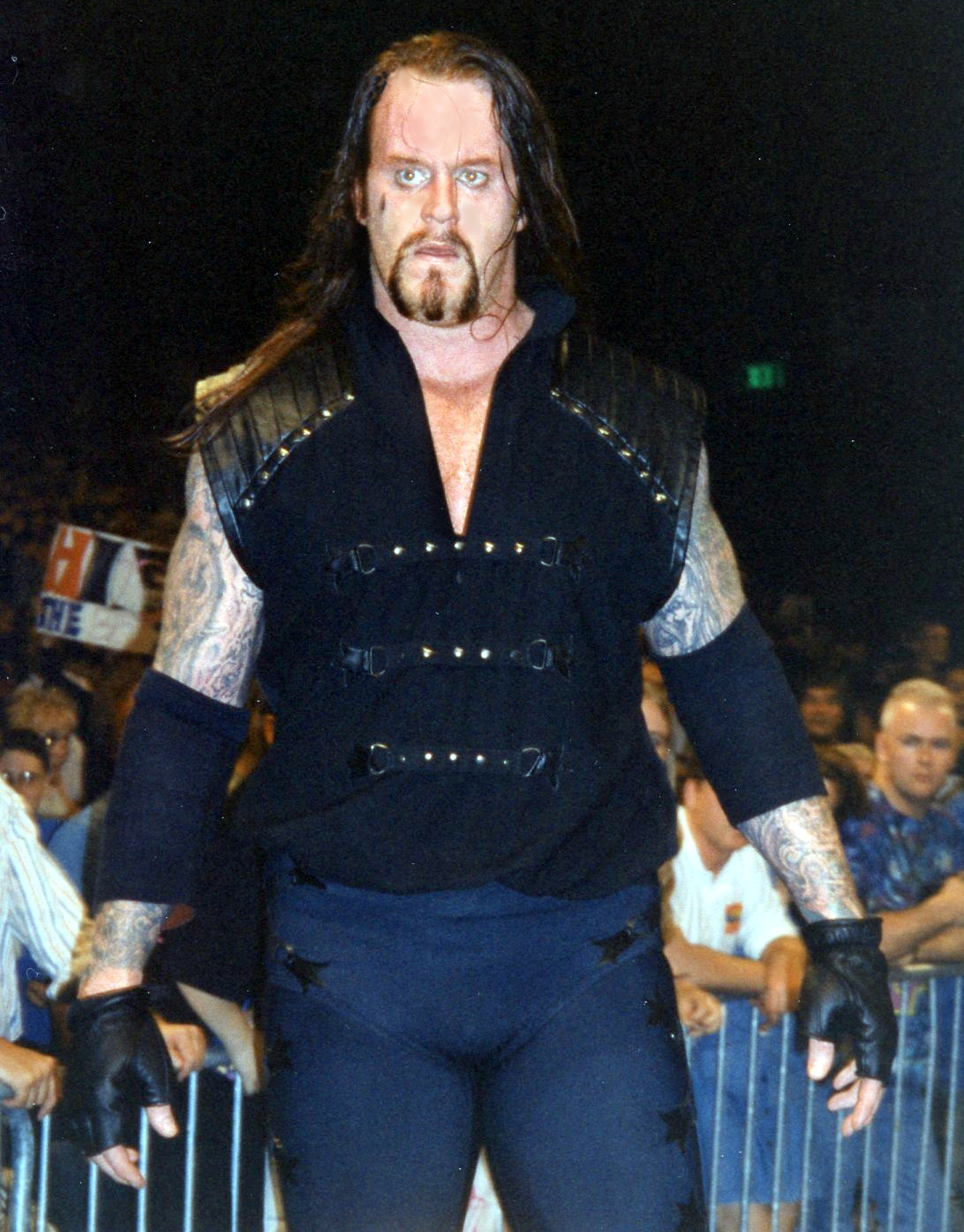
The Undertaker, who defeated Sycho Sid for the WWF Championship at WrestleMania 13

After In Your House, Vader and Undertaker's feud came to an end until the next In Your House: Canadian Stampede when Undertaker was the WWF Champion while Austin and Hart's continued.

In his mandatory defense against Sid on Raw, Hart lost the WWF Championship after Austin interfered and attacked him while Hart had the challenger locked in the Sharpshooter. Sid pinned Bret with a power bomb and won his second WWF Championship. Shortly thereafter, The Undertaker was given the #1 contender status and a match between him and Sid was signed for WrestleMania.

A frustrated Hart issued a challenge to Austin for WrestleMania, wanting to face him in a submission match. Austin accepted the challenge. Hart later received a rematch against Sid for the title in a steel cage match on March 17, and both men's WrestleMania opponents played a role in its outcome. Austin interfered on Hart's behalf, as he wanted an opportunity to wrestle for the WWF Championship. Undertaker, meanwhile, wanted Sid to retain the championship so he could have his title match at WrestleMania. It was Undertaker's interference that made the difference, as he slammed the cage door on Hart as he attempted to walk out and enabled Sid to escape.

While the steel cage was being dismantled, Vince McMahon attempted to interview Hart. Hart grabbed the microphone from McMahon, shoved him to the canvas, and launched into an expletive-laced tirade as his frustrations finally boiled over. This eventually resulted in Sid, Austin, and Undertaker returning to ringside where the four men began brawling.

Hart and Austin wrestled their regularly scheduled submission match at WrestleMania 13 with UFC fighter Ken Shamrock as guest referee for the match. Hart won the match after Austin passed out while locked in the Sharpshooter, refusing to submit despite heavy blood loss and the pain from the hold. The match ended with a double-turn as Austin turned babyface and Hart turned heel and reformed the Hart Foundation with Owen Hart, British Bulldog, Jim Neidhart and Brian Pillman who feuded with Austin. Later that night, Undertaker and Sid battled for Sid's WWF Championship in a no disqualification match. The newly heel turned Hart interfered in the match and helped Undertaker in defeating Sid for his second WWF Championship.

== Results ==
No.	Results	Stipulations	Times
1^{D}	The Godwinns (Henry O. Godwinn and Phineas I. Godwinn) defeated The Headbangers (Mosh and Thrasher)	Tag team match	11:24
2	Marc Mero (with Sable) defeated Leif Cassidy	Singles match	9:31
3	The Nation of Domination (Crush, Faarooq and Savio Vega) (with J. C. Ice, Wolfie D, D'Lo Brown, and Clarence Mason) defeated Bart Gunn, Flash Funk, and Goldust (with Marlena)	Six-man tag team match	6:43
4	Rocky Maivia (c) defeated Hunter Hearst Helmsley	Singles match for the WWF Intercontinental Championship	12:30
5	Doug Furnas and Phil LaFon defeated Owen Hart and The British Bulldog (c) (with Clarence Mason) by disqualification	Tag team match for the WWF Tag Team Championship	10:30
6	Bret Hart defeated "Stone Cold" Steve Austin, Vader (with Paul Bearer), and The Undertaker	Four corners elimination match for the vacant WWF Championship	24:06
(c) / – the champion(s) heading into the match; D / – this was a dark match
