= Phil Lafon =

Canadian professional wrestler (born 1961)

Dan Kroffat
Personal information
- Born: Philippe Lafon; September 16, 1961 (age 64) Manitouwadge, Ontario, Canada
- Education: NorQuest College

Professional wrestling career
- Ring name(s): Dan Kroffat; Danny Kroffat; Phil Lafleur; Phil Lafon; Philip Lafon; Rocky Venturo; Rene Rougeau; Blue Blazer II
- Billed height: 5 ft 11 in (180 cm)
- Billed weight: 231 lb (105 kg)
- Billed from: Montreal, Quebec, Canada
- Trained by: Mr. Hito
- Debut: 1983
- Retired: 2014

Philippe Lafon (born September 16, 1961) is a Canadian professional wrestler. He is best known for his appearances with the World Wrestling Federation as Phil Lafon and with All Japan Pro Wrestling and Extreme Championship Wrestling under the ring name Dan Kroffat.

== Early life ==
Lafon was born in Manitouwadge, Ontario, Canada, to his French-Canadian parents and raised in Montreal, Quebec, Canada.

== Professional wrestling career ==
=== Early career (1983–1988) ===
Lafon was discovered at a local gym in Canada by Davey Boy Smith and The Dynamite Kid, and was subsequently trained in the Hart Dungeon. In the Dungeon, he was trained by Mr. Hito. He spent two years in Stu Hart's Stampede Wrestling before leaving to work as "Rene Rougeau" in the Maritimes. During this time, he met The Cuban Assassin, who helped him get booked in Japan.

=== All Japan Pro Wrestling (1988–1996) ===
Kroffat was a longtime mainstay of All Japan Pro Wrestling with tag team partner Doug Furnas as the Can-Am Express. The two men were paired together by Giant Baba. It was there, that they had some of the most memorable tag team matches of the 1990s, including one match on May 25, 1992 with Kenta Kobashi and Tsuyoshi Kikuchi which received five stars from the Wrestling Observer Newsletter. The match is memorable for having one of the loudest crowds in pro wrestling history. With Furnas, Kroffat would win the All Asia Tag Team Championship a record five times defeating the likes of Footloose, The British Bruisers, The Patriot and The Eagle, Joel Deaton and Billy Black. As a singles wrestler, Kroffat also won the World Junior Heavyweight Championship on two occasions.

=== Extreme Championship Wrestling (1996, 1997–1998) ===
The duo joined Extreme Championship Wrestling (ECW) in late 1996, having a series of matches against Sabu and Rob Van Dam. At Unlucky Lottery, The Can-Am Express defeated Louie Spicolli and Mikey Whipwreck. At When Worlds Collide, The Can-Am Express fought Rob Van Dam and Sabu that ended in a time limit draw. On September 26, 1997, the Can-Am Express defeated Al Snow and Paul Diamond. At High Incident, the Can-Am Express lost to Rob Van Dam and Sabu. on the November 1 episode of HardcoreTV, the Can-Am Express lost to Chris Candido and Lance Storm. At Fright Fight 1997, Lafon and Furnas were defeated by Shane Douglas and Chris Candido. In December 1997, The Sandman, Tommy Dreamer, Al Snow and Taz defeated Lafon, Rob Van Dam, Sabu and Doug Furnas. They won the ECW World Tag Team Championship from The Full Blooded Italians on December 5. Their reign would not last long, however, as they went on to lose the belts to Chris Candido and Lance Storm the next day at Better Than Ever. Prior to the team's tag team title success LaFon had made an unsuccessful attempt to dethrone ECW Champion Shane Douglas in singles competition at As Good as It Gets. On the January 7, 1998 episode of Hardcore TV, LaFon, Doug Furnas, Rob Van Dam and Sabu lost to Al Snow, Taz, The Sandman and Tommy Dreamer in an eight-man tag team match.

Lafon and Furnas also formed a short-lived stable of "invaders" from the WWF with Lance Wright, Brakkus and Droz.

=== World Wrestling Federation (1996–1997) ===
A few months later, both men made their World Wrestling Federation (WWF) debuts on November 17 at the Survivor Series pay-per-view. After failing to win the Tag Team Titles the duo began a slow heel turn and developed an anti American wrestling fan gimmick similar to that of The Hart Foundation. At In Your House 13: Final Four, Lafon and Furnas got a shot at the WWF Tag Team Championship where they defeated Owen Hart and the British Bulldog by disqualification but they did not win the titles. A few months into his WWF run, Lafon was in a car crash between Montreal and Ottawa. At WrestleMania 13, Lafon and Furnas competed in a Four-way elimination match to determine #1 contenders for the WWF Tag Team Championship which was won by The Headbangers. At In Your House 14: Revenge of the 'Taker, Lafon and Furnas competed in a dark match where they defeated The Godwinns. He returned in the fall of 1997 as full fledged heels most notably as a part of Team Canada at Survivor Series in his hometown Montreal. LaFon would make a few more appearances with Furnas afterwards, mostly on Shotgun Saturday Night (notably with one match being against the then-jobbers the Hardy Boyz), before they were later sent to ECW.

=== Late career (1998–2014) ===
After leaving both WWF and ECW, Doug Furnas retired from wrestling and the pair went their own separate ways. Lafon wrestled in Mexico for Consejo Mundial de Lucha Libre in 1998 as the Blue Blazer II. He returned to All Japan between 2000 and 2001, then worked in the independents in Western Canada until his initial retirement in 2006.

Lafon was the Head Trainer of Monster Pro Wrestling (MPW) in Edmonton, Alberta, Canada. On March 6, 2010 in Edmonton, he returned to the ring to compete with MPW after five years of being in retirement, due to nagging knee and shoulder injuries. He would wrestle his last match in 2014.

== Personal life ==
In 2014, Lafon graduated from NorQuest College with a diploma in social work.

== Championships and accomplishments ==
- All Japan Pro Wrestling
  - All Asia Tag Team Championship (5 times) – with Doug Furnas
  - World Junior Heavyweight Championship (2 times)
  - World's Strongest Tag Determination League New Wave Award (1989) – with Doug Furnas
  - World's Strongest Tag Determination League Power Award (1991) – with Doug Furnas
- Extreme Championship Wrestling
  - ECW World Tag Team Championship (1 time) – with Doug Furnas
- Lutte Internationale
  - Canadian International Tag Team Championship (2 times) – with Tom Zenk (1 time) and Armand Rougeau (1 time)
- Monster Pro Wrestling
  - MPW Tag Team Championship (1 time) – with Sonic Insania
- Pro Wrestling Illustrated
  - Ranked No. 163 of the 500 top singles wrestlers during the "PWI Years" in 2003
- Universal Wrestling Association
  - UWA World Tag Team Championship (2 times) – with Doug Furnas
- World Wrestling Council
  - WWC World Tag Team Championship (1 time) – with Tama
  - WWC Caribbean Tag Team Championship (1 time) – with Bobby Jaggers
- Wrestling Observer Newsletter
  - Match of the Year (1992) with Doug Furnas vs. Kenta Kobashi and Tsuyoshi Kikuchi, Sendai, May 25
  - Most Underrated Wrestler (1989)

== See also ==
- The Can-Am Express
