= Achim Albrecht =

German bodybuilder, personal trainer and professional wrestler (born 1962)

- Professional bodybuilder

Personal info
- Born: Achim Albrecht; 2 July 1962 (age 64); Münster, North Rhine-Westphalia, West Germany

Best statistics
- Height: 5 ft 11 in (180 cm)
- Weight: 303 lb (137 kg)

Professional (Pro) career
- Best win: IFBB Mr. Universe (over 90 kilograms category); 1990
- Predecessor: Jean Luc
- Successor: Ronnie Coleman

Achim Albrecht (born 2 July 1962) is a German personal trainer and former bodybuilder and professional wrestler. He is best known for winning the over 90 kilograms category of the International Federation of BodyBuilding & Fitness Mr. Universe contest in Malaysia in 1990. In 1996, Albrecht transitioned to professional wrestling, where he appeared with North American promotions such as the World Wrestling Federation (WWF), Extreme Championship Wrestling (ECW) and the United States Wrestling Association (USWA) under the ring name Brakkus (also spelled Brakus) until retiring due to injury in 1999.

== Bodybuilding career ==
Achim Albrecht initially participated in rowing and weightlifting in his native Germany before shifting to bodybuilding in 1985. In 1989, Albrecht won the International German Bodybuilding Championships in Nuremberg, Bavaria. In 1990, he won the International Federation of BodyBuilding & Fitness (IFBB) Mr. Universe contest (over 90 kilograms category) in Kuala Lumpur, Malaysia.

In 1991, Albrecht relocated to the United States, where he signed a contract with Joe Weider, the co-founder of the IFBB. Albrecht competed on the bodybuilding circuit and authored articles on nutrition and body training for the magazines Flex and Muscle & Fitness.

He competed in the 1991 Mr. Olympia contest (placing ninth) and in the 1992 Arnold Classic contest (placing fourth). In mid-1992, Albrecht sustained a torn biceps while performing a barbell preacher curl that prevented him from competing in the 1992 Mr. Olympia contest. Upon recovering from the injury, Albrecht competed in the 1993 and 1994 Arnold Classic contests (placing tenth and eighth), the 1994 Mr. Olympia contest (placing seventeenth) and the 1996 IFBB Night of Champions contest (placing tenth).

In 2009, Albrecht was placed eighth in a historical ranking of the bodybuilders with the best quadriceps femoris muscles by Flex.

== Professional wrestling career ==
Achim Albrecht
Personal information
- Born: 2 July 1962 (age 64) Münster, North Rhine-Westphalia, Germany
- Spouses: Dayna Medeiros (divorced)
- Children: 2

Professional wrestling career
- Ring name(s): Achim Albrecht; Argo; Brakkus; Brakus
- Billed height: 6 ft 0 in (183 cm)
- Billed weight: 275 lb (125 kg)
- Billed from: Germany; Stamford, Connecticut
- Trained by: Tom Prichard; Bret Hart
- Debut: 30 November 1996
- Retired: 1999

=== World Wrestling Federation (1996–1997) ===
In September 1996, Albrecht signed a contract with the World Wrestling Federation (WWF). He was trained as a professional wrestler by Tom Prichard and Bret Hart alongside Mark Henry and Dwayne "The Rock" Johnson.

Albrecht made his professional wrestling debut on 30 November 1996, under the ring name "Argo", defeating Dr. X at a house show in Lowell, Massachusetts. On 2 December 1996, he was renamed "Brakkus" (also spelled "Brakus", the same name as the antagonist of the 1993 martial arts film Best of the Best 2 portrayed by the German actor and bodybuilder Ralf Möller).

Albrecht wrestled at WWF house shows and in dark matches throughout late 1996 and 1997, including a dark match at the In Your House 12: It's Time pay-per-view on 15 December 1996 where he defeated Dr. X. His regular opponents included Tony DeVito, Rockabilly, The Sultan, Salvatore Sincere and The Jackyl. In mid-1997, vignettes began airing to promote Albrecht's debut on WWF television in which he threatened members of the WWF roster such as Vader and Triple H.

My name is Brakkus and I come from Germany. I weigh 300 pounds. And when I come to America, to the World Wrestling Federation, I will get Vader in the ring and destroy him!

=== United States Wrestling Association (1997) ===
In mid-1997, Albrecht wrestled several matches for the United States Wrestling Association (USWA) in Tennessee, where he was aligned with Elijah as a temporary member of the Nation of Domination stable. While appearing with the USWA, Albrecht wrestled several matches against Bill Dundee.

=== Extreme Championship Wrestling (1997–1998) ===
In late-1997, Albrecht was sent by the WWF to the Philadelphia, Pennsylvania-based independent promotion Extreme Championship Wrestling (ECW) as part of a working relationship between the two promotions. The secondment to ECW was intended to season Albrecht's abilities before he debuted on WWF television.

In ECW, Albrecht was part of the Wright Connection, a stable led by Lance Wright along with Doug Furnas, Phil Lafon and Droz. The stable were billed as having been sent to ECW by the WWF Chairman, Vince McMahon, with Albrecht acting as the bodyguard of Wright. As part of the angle, Albrecht wore a T-shirt reading "Property of the WWF", was billed from Stamford, Connecticut (the location of the WWF headquarters) and would drape a WWF banner over defeated opponents. At November to Remember 1997, Albrecht, Furnas and Lafon interfered in a "WWF versus ECW" flag match between Rob Van Dam and Tommy Dreamer.

Albrecht feuded with ECW mainstay Taz, ultimately challenging him for the ECW World Television Championship at CyberSlam 1998 on 21 February 1998. The match saw Albrecht powerbomb Taz twice before receiving a suplex through a table and submitting to the Tazmission. The match aired in syndication on 25 February 1998, episode of ECW Hardcore TV.

=== Return to the WWF (1998) ===
Albrecht was recalled to the WWF in March 1998, making his WWF television debut on 17 March 1998, episode of WWF Shotgun Saturday Night, losing to The Artist Formerly Known as Goldust. Albrecht then travelled to Europe with the WWF, losing to Jeff Jarrett at WWF Mayhem in Manchester on 4 April 1998. He went on to wrestle Jarrett at live events in Oberhausen, Berlin and Bayreuth during the DX in Germany tour. During this period, Albrecht routinely wore a chainmail vest to the ring.

In the summer of 1998, Albrecht was entered in the WWF Brawl for All, a shootfighting tournament. Albrecht faced Savio Vega in a first round match on 6 July 1998, episode of Monday Night Raw. Albrecht was eliminated from the tournament after Vega won the match on points, with Albrecht sustaining a bloodied nose. Vega later claimed that Albrecht was originally not aware that the Brawl for All was a shootfighting tournament and had initially believed it would be worked.

Abrecht went on to defeat Jesús Castillo, Jr. of Los Boricuas in a squash match on 27 July 1998, episode of Raw is War in his final televised WWF match.

=== Stampede Wrestling and retirement (1999) ===
Albrecht left the WWF in 1998. He competed briefly on the Canadian independent circuit under his real name, wrestling for promotions such as Stampede Wrestling. While on the independent circuit, Albrecht formed a short-lived tag team with the English wrestler Davey Boy Smith called "The European Alliance".

Albrecht retired from professional wrestling in 1999 as a result of injuries to his knee and shoulder sustained in the bout with Vega in 1998. He went on to work as an International Sports Sciences Association-certified personal trainer and sports nutritionist in San Francisco, California.

== Personal life ==
Albrecht was previously married to Dayna Medeiros, with whom he has a son and a daughter.

== Championships and accomplishments ==
=== Bodybuilding ===
- German Bodybuilding and Fitness Federation
  - International German Bodybuilding Championships winner (1989)
- International Federation of BodyBuilding & Fitness
  - Mr. Universe (over 90 kilograms category) (1990)
