= Can-Am Express =

Professional wrestling tag team

Tag team
- Members: Doug Furnas; Dan Kroffat/Phil LaFon
- Name(s): The Can-Am Express; Doug Furnas and Dan Kroffat; Doug Furnas and Phil LaFon
- Billed heights: 5 ft 11 in (1.80 m) - Furnas; 5 ft 11 in (1.80 m) - Kroffat/LaFon
- Combined billed weight: 484 lb (220 kg; 34.6 st)
- Debut: June 5, 1989
- Disbanded: 1998

The Can-Am Express was a professional wrestling tag team comprising Doug Furnas and Dan Kroffat/Phil LaFon who wrestled in promotions such as All Japan Pro Wrestling (AJPW), Extreme Championship Wrestling (ECW), Universal Wrestling Association (UWA) and World Wrestling Federation (WWF). They teamed up together for nine years from 1989 to 1999 and held success as tag team competitors. In AJPW, they were a record five-time All Asia Tag Team Champions. In ECW, they were one-time World Tag Team Champions and in UWA, they were two-time World Tag Team Champions.

== Career ==
=== All Japan Pro Wrestling (First run, 1989–1992) ===
Doug Furnas and Dan Kroffat were long-time mainstays in All Japan Pro Wrestling (AJPW). Both men stood 5'11" tall. They teamed for the first time as heels on June 5, 1989 beating Footloose (Samson Fuyuki and Toshiaki Kawada) for the All Asia Tag Team Championship. They spent their early beginnings as a tag team and champions, feuding with Fuyuki and Kawada. After four months, they lost the titles back to Kawada and Fuyuki on October 20. Furnas and Kroffat regained the titles from Kawada and Fuyuki on March 2, 1990 winning the titles for a second time. They lost the titles a month later to the popular tag team of Kenta Kobashi and Tiger Mask II. They wrestled many makeshift tag teams and tried to regain their All Asia tag titles. They spent the rest of the year, feuding with tag team champions. On April 20, 1991, they defeated The Dynamite Kid and Johnny Smith ending their short reign of just two weeks. As a result of this victory, Furnas and Kroffat became 3-time All Asia Tag Team Champions, a record held by former champions Samson Fuyuki and Toshiaki Kawada. As a result, there were only two teams during that time to hold the All Asia tag titles three times.

On July 8, they would lose the titles to Johnny Ace and Kenta Kobashi. AJPW wanted Furnas and Kroffat to regain the All Asia tag titles, so Joel Deaton and Billy Black were used as champions and defeated Ace and Kobashi for the titles and eight days later, they were defeated by Furnas and Kroffat for the titles. As a result of this victory, this unlikely Canadian-American duo became All Asia Tag Team Champions for a fourth time holding a record for most time as champions. They would hold the titles for 304 days, becoming eleventh longest reigning champions before they eventually lost the titles to Tsuyoshi Kikuchi and Kenta Kobashi on May 25, 1992 becoming a dominant team of their era. They left Japan and went to work in Mexico.

=== Universal Wrestling Association (1992–1993) ===
After losing the All Asia Tag Team Championship to Kikuchi and Kobashi, Furnas and Kroffat left AJPW and debuted in Universal Wrestling Association (UWA), where they worked as Can-Am Express (A common misconception is that they worked as the "Can-Am Connection"). Shortly after debut, they defeated Los Cowboys / Los Effectivos (Silver King and El Texano) for their first UWA World Tag Team Championship. They started a historic feud with Los Cowboys and defended the titles twice against them in July. Furnas and Kroffat retained their titles until they lost to Los Villanos (Villano IV and Villano V) on November 28 of that year. Furnas and Kroffat began feuding with the Villanos but they did not get a title shot for the rest of the year.

They eventually won the titles for a second time on March 7, 1993 by defeating Los Villanos. In the next month of April, their lengthy feud with Los Villanos ended after Los Villanos defeated them for a second time to win the titles. Furnas and Kroffat left UWA shortly after and returned to AJPW.

=== All Japan Pro Wrestling (Second run, 1993–1996) ===
Furnas and Kroffat returned to AJPW in May 1993. On May 21, Dan Kroffat surprisingly won the World Junior Heavyweight Championship from Masanobu Fuchi which culminated in a feud between the two junior heavyweights. Kroffat reigned as champion for the summer of 1993 before eventually losing the title back to Fuchi. However, the next month, on September 9, the duo became a record-breaking 5-time All Asia Tag Team Champions after beating The Eagle and The Patriot for the titles. They continued their domination in the tag team division while Kroffat won the World Junior Heavyweight Championship for a second time on July 12, 1994 becoming a double champion. On December 5, Kroffat and Furnas vacated the All Asia Tag Team Championship to focus on the World Tag Team Championship, but became the fifth longest reigning champions in history with a reign of 451 days. Kroffat also reigned as champion for over a year eventually losing the title to Yoshinari Ogawa on September 10, 1995.

=== Extreme Championship Wrestling (First run, 1996) ===
Kroffat and Furnas debuted in hardcore wrestling promotion Extreme Championship Wrestling (ECW) in 1996.

After losing to Rob Van Dam at Natural Born Killaz in August 1996, Furnas refused to show respect and suplexed RVD across the ring. Deciding that he wanted to teach Furnas about respect, RVD challenged him to a tag team match at When Worlds Collide II. Furnas brought in Kroffat, while Van Dam chose Sabu as his partner. Sabu and Rob Van Dam had been feuding all year, but worked very well together. The two teams had a great series of matches, regarded as some of the best in the company's history. Not long after, Furnas and Kroffat left ECW.

=== World Wrestling Federation (1996–1997) ===
Dan Kroffat renamed himself "Phil LaFon". Furnas and LaFon signed contracts with World Wrestling Federation (WWF) and made their pay-per-view (PPV) debut as faces at Survivor Series 1996, participating for the first time in a WWF ring in a Survivor Series match where they teamed with The Godwinns (Henry and Phineas) against WWF Tag Team Champions Owen Hart and British Bulldog and New Rockers (Marty Jannetty and Leif Cassidy). Furnas and LaFon were the survivors, last pinning tag champions. As 1997 began, they began a feud with Hart and Bulldog over the tag titles, due to having pinned the champions. They got a title shot at Final Four and won the match by disqualification after Owen hit LaFon with his Slammy as Bulldog had LaFon in the powerslam. Though Furnas and LaFon won the match they did not win the titles because a title cannot change hands by a DQ. After this feud, they began a rivalry with the Legion of Doom, turning heel in the process. In the summer of 1997, Furnas and LaFon were in a car accident which kept them out of action for several months. They returned in the fall of 1997 where they teamed with the British Bulldog and Jim Neidhart as a part of Team Canada at Survivor Series 1997 against Team USA (Vader, Goldust, Marc Mero, & Steve Blackman). LaFon would be the second eliminated from Team Canada by Vader while Furnas was able to eliminate Mero before he was eliminated by Vader. Bulldog would be the sole survivor. After Survivor Series, Furnas and LaFon would make a few more appearances mostly on Shotgun Saturday Night with one match being against the then-unknown Hardy Boyz before being sent to ECW.

=== Extreme Championship Wrestling (Second run, 1997–1998) ===
In late 1997, Furnas and LaFon returned to Extreme Championship Wrestling (ECW). Upon their return, they were a part of the Team WWF/Team Titan stable. One of their first notable appearances was at ECW November To Remember 1997 where they assisted Rob Van Dam in a match against Tommy Dreamer.

On December 5, 1997, they defeated the FBI for the ECW World Tag Team Championship. 24 hours later at Better Than Ever, they lost the titles to Chris Candido and Lance Storm in a three-way also involving Balls Mahoney and Axl Rotten. Following the title loss, the team broke up in early 1998 when LaFon left ECW. Furnas continued to wrestle as a singles wrestler throughout 1998 before he too eventually left and retired.

Lafon worked in Mexico, returned to All Japan Pro Wrestling and the independent circuit in Western Canada until retiring in 2014.

Furnas died in February 2012 and his body was found on March 2, 2012 at 52 from a heart attack.

== Championships and accomplishments ==
- All Japan Pro Wrestling
  - All Asia Tag Team Championship (5 times)
  - World Junior Heavyweight Championship (2 times) - Dan Kroffat
  - World's Strongest Tag Determination League New Wave Award (1989)
  - World's Strongest Tag Determination League Power Award (1991)
- Extreme Championship Wrestling
  - ECW World Tag Team Championship (1 time)
- Pro Wrestling Illustrated
  - PWI ranked them #38 of the 100 best tag teams during the "PWI Years" in 2003
- Universal Wrestling Association
  - UWA World Tag Team Championship (2 times)
- Wrestling Observer Newsletter awards

- Match of the Year (1992) with vs. Kenta Kobashi and Tsuyoshi Kikuchi, Sendai, May 25
