= WWF Shotgun Saturday Night =

WWF Professional wrestling television program

- Also known as: WWF Shotgun; WWF New York; WWF 11:Alive
- Created by: World Wrestling Federation
- Country of origin: United States
- No. of episodes: 127 (List of WWF Shotgun Saturday Night episodes)

Production
- Running time: 60 minutes

Original release
- Network: Syndication
- Release: January 4, 1997 – August 21, 1999

Related
- WWF Jakked/Metal (1999–2002)

WWF Shotgun Saturday Night, or simply Shotgun Saturday Night, is a professional wrestling television program that was produced by the World Wrestling Federation (WWF). It aired from January 4, 1997, through August 21, 1999, as a syndicated broadcast. Originally the show had a unique format by taking place in clubs and other locations and made to be a more adult-oriented product. This experimental format was scrapped after only six weeks, and Shotgun Saturday Night was repackaged into a regular arena-taped show featuring midcard and lowcard talent, replacing WWF Superstars. Shotgun Saturday Night itself was replaced by WWF Jakked in 1999.

== History ==
The show's original concept was unusual for its time; it aired live (depending on market) on late Saturday nights, beginning 11pm, from various New York City nightlife locations. The promotion pushed the program as an "edgier" product than its normal weekly offerings.

Shotgun Saturday Night debuted on January 4, 1997, from the Mirage Nightclub in New York. One of the most memorable moments of the debut episode occurred when Marlena climbed on the ring apron during a match between Goldust and The Sultan, and removed her top, causing the Sultan to be distracted and lose the match. Though she was wearing pasties, and though her back was facing the camera, this incident was a precursor for the tone of WWF programming for the next several years. The risque late night nature of the show also led to another moment, where Sunny teased a home "sex tape", which ended up in a comedic segment featuring a Fondle Me Elmo.

Later episodes of Shotgun Saturday Night were broadcast from the All-Star Cafe in Times Square, the Mirage Nightclub in Manhattan, and New York Penn Station. There were several unique elements to the show that did not appear on any other WWF programming at the time. For example, due to the confining nature of the locales it was initially broadcast from, Shotgun Saturday Night used a somewhat smaller ring than a standard 20-foot by 20-foot WWF ring. All three ring ropes were taped yellow; something that was not replicated until NXT debuted in 2010.

After seven episodes, beginning in March 1997, the nightclub theme was dropped and the show's matches began being taped in an arena before or after the live Monday Night Raw show. It effectively replaced WWF Superstars as the company's 'B' Show, being used to recap the now two-hour Raw show with original matches featuring lower-level talent.

== Commentators ==
The show originally featured commentary by Vince McMahon and Sunny, with Jim Ross and Brian Pillman performing the same duties until mid-1997, when Pillman was pulled from commentary after beating up a (planted) fan on the June 28, 1997 episode. Kevin Kelly, Michael Cole, Jim Cornette and Vince Russo also served as commentators. Stone Cold Steve Austin also served as a surprise guest commentator on one episode along with Owen Hart.

== Alternate versions ==
The WWF also aired a similar syndicated show at the time called WWF Shotgun Challenge, which aired in earlier time slots (replacing WWF Challenge) and was more family-friendly. This version of the show was later renamed simply WWF Shotgun and ultimately replaced with WWF Metal in 1999. From 1997 until 1999, matches from WWF Shotgun were aired on the international version of WWF Superstars with commentary by Michael Cole and Kevin Kelly, and in January 1999, Gorilla Monsoon joined them.

In the New York media market, the show was rebranded as WWF New York from 1997 to late 1999, airing on WPIX and WPXN-TV, and later WLNY. It was shown late at night, airing at 2:00 a.m., Eastern time (WPXN aired the series on Saturday mornings).

In February 1998, the WWF aired 11:Alive which aired the matches in the same order as WWF New York, but with different commentary that made fewer references to New York. The show aired on Saturday mornings and only ran for two months before being discontinued. The final episode was hosted by Michael Hayes as a preview show to WrestleMania XIV.

WWF Shotgun had its origins in the Wisconsin market, which initially started airing on WLUK-TV in late 1997 before being picked up by other syndicated channels. In a similar manner to WWF New York, the commentary for WWF Shotgun made references to the Green Bay area, as well as exclusive wrestler promos for house shows throughout the state. Versions in other states would make fewer references to Green Bay and not have these promos.

== See also ==
- List of WWF Shotgun Saturday Night episodes
