= Doug Furnas =

American professional wrestler, powerlifter (1959-2012)

Personal information
- Born: Dwight Douglas Furnas; December 11, 1959 Commerce, Oklahoma, U.S.
- Died: March 2, 2012 (aged 52) Tucson, Arizona, U.S.
- Cause of death: Atherosclerotic and hypertensive heart disease

Professional wrestling career
- Ring name(s): Doug Furnas; Can-Am Express #1
- Billed height: 5 ft 10 in (178 cm)
- Billed weight: 243 lb (110 kg)
- Trained by: Davey Rich; Johnny Rich; Rick Conners
- Debut: 1986
- Retired: 2000

Dwight Douglas Furnas (December 11, 1959 – March 2, 2012) was an American professional wrestler and powerlifter. He was an APF National and World Powerlifting Champion, who set multiple world records in the 275 pounds (125 kg) weight class. As a wrestler, Furnas worked for, among other promotions, American majors World Championship Wrestling (WCW), Extreme Championship Wrestling (ECW), and World Wrestling Federation (WWF) best known for being part of the tag team The Can-Am Express with tag team partner Phil Lafon. Furnas was also a longtime mainstay of All Japan Pro Wrestling.

== Powerlifting career ==
Before becoming a lifter, Furnas was a promising American football player. He attended Commerce High School in Commerce, Oklahoma, earning a state runner up in 1978 before helping the Northeastern Oklahoma A&M Norsemen to a NJCAA National Football Championship. Later, he transferred to play for the Tennessee Volunteers; he rushed for 630 yards and two touchdowns in two seasons as a running back at Tennessee. Furnas signed with the Denver Broncos of the National Football League (NFL), but injuries in training camp caused him to retire from football. Upon starting powerlifting, Furnas initially campaigned as a 242 pounds (110 kg) lifter. At a height of 5 feet 10 inches (178 cm) he was actually a bit too tall for the weight class. His 242-pound class competitors tended to be in the 5'6" to 5'8" range. When Furnas allowed his bodyweight to rise to a full 275 pounds, he became the third man in history to total 2400 (after Don Reinhoudt and Bill Kazmaier) and the first man ever to total 2,400 pounds (1,100 kg) twice - all achieved at an astonishing 265-275 pound bodyweight. The first time, he totaled 2400 pounds at the inaugural APF World Championships 1986 in Maui, Hawaii, squatting 986 pounds (447 kg) in an old squat suit, bench pressing 600 pounds (270 kg) in a loose US size 60 bench shirt and deadlifting 814 pounds (369 kg).

He achieved his second 2400+ total six months later on June 28, 1987, at the APF National Championships in Bloomington, Minnesota with a total of 2403 lbs (1090 kg) while competing in the 125 kg/275 lb weight class. This time deadlifting 826 lbs for a new personal record. Although he was arguably the most dominant 275 pound lifter in history, he ended his very short but incredible powerlifting career shortly afterwards in favor of professional wrestling. Furnas had set 29 powerlifting world records throughout his career. Furnas is known throughout the powerlifting world as one of the greatest squat technicians in history, eventually squatting 986 pounds (447 kg). Although it was not widely known during his lifetime, Furnas was allergic to chalk, which prevented him from obtaining an optimal grip on his deadlifts. Furnas still holds the men's collegiate national records in the squat (400 kg/881.75 lb) and deadlift (347.5 kg/766 lb) in the 110 kg / 242 lb weight class, which he set on March 26, 1983, while attending the University of Tennessee. He also holds the Tennessee state records for the squat (986 lb), deadlift (826 lb), and total (2403 lbs).

=== Personal records ===
Done in official Powerlifting full meets with minimal supportive gear

- Squat - 986 lbs (447 kg) equipped
- Bench press - 600 lbs (272.2 kg) equipped
- Deadlift - 826 lbs (374.6 kg)
- Total - 2403 lbs (1090 kg) equipped

== Professional wrestling career ==
=== Continental Championship Wrestling (1986–1988) ===
Furnas began his career in Continental Championship Wrestling in late 1986, as a "guest" of the promotion during a card at the civic center in Knoxville, Tennessee. He watched promoter Bob Polk get assaulted by Kevin Sullivan, then the manager for the New Guinea Headhunters, until he could bear no more, and injected himself into the situation, effectively beginning his pro wrestling career.

During his run in Continental, Furnas feuded with Sullivan, Buddy Landell, and Sid Eudy's version of Lord Humongous, as well as Terry Gordy. In late 1989, Continental folded, and by that time, Furnas had left to spend time in All Japan Pro Wrestling and World Championship Wrestling.

=== World Championship Wrestling (1990) ===
Furnas debuted in World Championship Wrestling on January 31, 1990 on the February 3 episode of NWA World Championship Wrestling by defeating Galaxian #1. At the same taping, he would also defeat Galaxian #2). Furnas followed this by defeating Jack Victory on the February 17 episode of NWA World Championship Wrestling, then went back for another All Japan tour.

On May 19, Furnas returned at Capital Combat, where he was interviewed by Tony Schiavone regarding the condition of Lex Luger. He made his house show debut three days later, defeating Samoan Savage in Ozark, Alabama. On the June 2 episode of NWA Pro Furnas defeated Cactus Jack, and would later defeat Jack in several house show matches.

As the summer began the undefeated Furnas became a member of a Sting-led group of fan favorites known as the "Dudes With Attitudes" as they feuded with the perennially dominant Four Horsemen stable, led by NWA World Heavyweight Champion Ric Flair. Furnas' involvement in the stable saw him face the newly arrived Barry Windham at Clash of the Champions XI on June 13, 1990, where he sustained his first defeat.

Furnas teamed with Junkyard Dog to defeat NWA World Heavyweight Champion Ric Flair and NWA Television Champion Arn Anderson at a house show in Chattanooga, Tennessee. On July 7 he made his PPV debut, defeating Dutch Mantel at Great American Bash in Baltimore, Maryland. Following several additional house show wins against Mantell, Furnas was defeated by the newly returned Bam Bam Bigelow at the Omni in Atlanta, Georgia on July 15.

On the August 4 episode of NWA World Championship Wrestling, Brad Armstrong announced he had formed a team with Furnas and the duo would soon be challenging WCW United States Tag Team Champions the Midnight Express. This partnership would ultimately not take place as Armstrong reformed his Lightning Express tag-team with Tim Horner. Instead, Furnas engaged in a brief house show series with "Mean" Mark Callous. His final match for WCW came on August 5 in Norfolk, Virginia in a defeat to Callous.

=== All Japan Pro Wrestling (1989–1996) ===
In All Japan Pro Wrestling (AJPW), Furnas teamed with Dan Kroffat beginning in 1989. Together they formed the Can-Am Express. Furnas and Kroffat held the All Asia Tag Team Championship five times between June 1989 and September 1993 when they vacated the title so they could focus on the World Tag Team Championship. Their title match on May 25, 1992, against Kenta Kobashi and Tsuyoshi Kikuchi received five stars from the Wrestling Observer Newsletter and was also named "Match of the Year".

Also in 1992, the duo wrestled for Mexico's Universal Wrestling Association (UWA) as The Can-Am Connection. In Mexico, they held the UWA World Tag Team Championship twice, trading it with Los Villanos (Villano IV and Villano V).

=== Extreme Championship Wrestling (1996) ===
The Can-Am Express joined Extreme Championship Wrestling (ECW) in mid 1996; Furnas made his in-ring debut in a losing effort against Rob Van Dam on August 24, 1996 after being revealed as a mystery opponent for the latter. On September 13 he was joined by LaFon and the duo defeated Mikey Whipwreck and Louie Spicolli. On October 26 the duo was defeated by Sabu and Rob Van Dam in Philadelphia, PA.

=== World Wrestling Federation (1996–1997) ===
The Can-Am Express made their World Wrestling Federation debuts on November 17, 1996, at the Survivor Series pay-per-view. They feuded with Owen Hart and the British Bulldog and defeated them by disqualification at In Your House 13: Final Four but never captured the WWF World Tag Team titles. In the summer of 1997, Furnas and LaFon were in a car accident which kept them out of action for several months. They returned to WWF that fall where they appeared at Survivor Series (1997) teaming with Jim Neidhart and British Bulldog as Team Canada against Team USA: Vader, Goldust, Marc Mero and Steve Blackman. Furnas was able to eliminate Mero before he was eliminated by Vader. Bulldog would be the sole survivor. After Survivor Series, Furnas and LaFon would make a few more appearances mostly on Shotgun Saturday Night with one match being against the young Hardy Boyz before returning to ECW.

=== Extreme Championship Wrestling (1997–1998) ===
The Can-Am Express they returned to ECW in late 1997, where they formed a stable of "invaders" from the WWF with Lance Wright, Brakkus and Droz. They won the ECW World Tag Team Title on December 5 from the F.B.I. Their reign would not last long, however, as they lost the belts to Chris Candido and Lance Storm the next day at Better Than Ever. Furnas went on wrestle Masato Tanaka in singles competition at Living Dangerously on March 1, 1998. Furnas came up on the losing end on this particular occasion. He also became one of Rob Van Dam's many unsuccessful challengers during Van Dam's record breaking ECW Television Championship run.

== Retirement and death ==
Upon retiring, Furnas and his wife ran a group home in San Diego for abused boys. He would also raise bucking stock rodeo bulls in his family's farm.

Furnas's body was discovered on March 3, 2012, at his home in Tucson, Arizona; the precise date of his death could not be estimated by the medical examiner because of decomposition, but is presumed to have been sometime in February. He was 52 years old. The official cause of death was atherosclerotic and hypertensive heart disease. He had been battling Parkinson's disease for many years prior to his death. His death was confirmed by one of his sisters.

== Championships and accomplishments ==
- All Japan Pro Wrestling
  - All Asia Tag Team Championship (5 times) with Dan Kroffat
  - World's Strongest Tag Determination League New Wave Award (1989) with Dan Kroffat
  - World's Strongest Tag Determination League Power Award (1991) with Dan Kroffat
- Extreme Championship Wrestling
  - ECW World Tag Team Championship (1 time) with Phil Lafon
- Pro Wrestling Illustrated
  - PWI ranked him # 138 of the 500 best singles wrestlers of the PWI 500 in 1997
  - PWI ranked him # 181 of the 500 best singles wrestlers during the "PWI Years" in 2003.
- Pro Wrestling This Week
  - Wrestler of the Week (July 12–18, 1987)
- Universal Wrestling Association
  - UWA World Tag Team Championship (2 times) with Dan Kroffat
- USA Wrestling
  - USA Heavyweight Championship (1 time)
  - USA Tennessee Heavyweight Championship (1 time)
- Wrestling Observer Newsletter
  - Match of the Year (1992) with Dan Kroffat vs. Kenta Kobashi and Tsuyoshi Kikuchi, Sendai, May 25
