= Rob Van Dam and Sabu =

Professional wrestling tag team

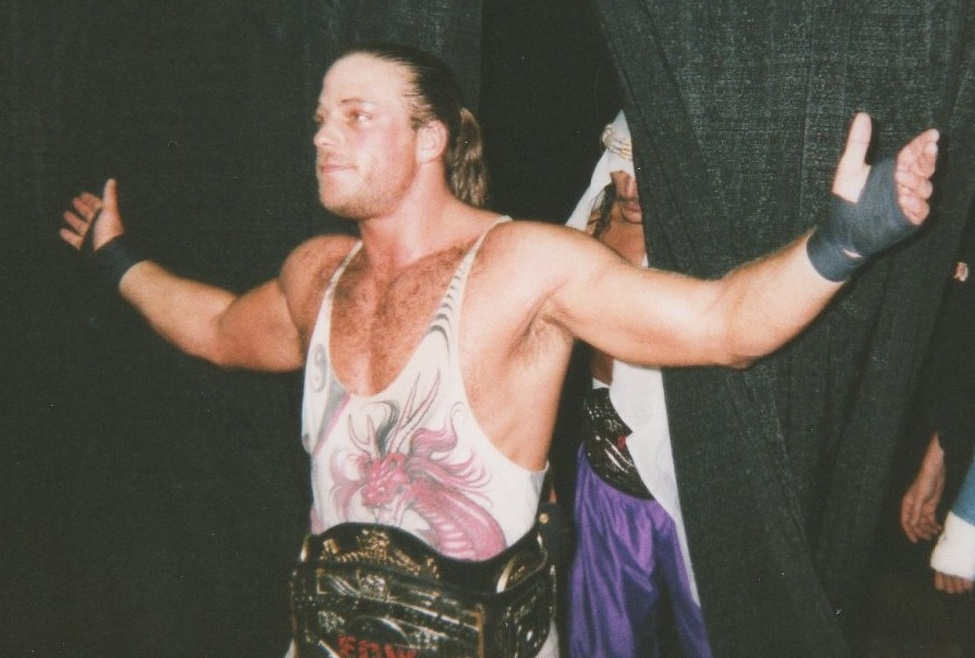
- Rob Van Dam and Sabu in 1998

Tag team
- Members: Rob Van Dam; Sabu
- Name(s): Rob Van Dam and Sabu; ECW Originals
- Billed heights: Rob Van Dam: 6 ft 0 in (1.83 m); Sabu: 6 ft 0 in (1.83 m)
- Combined billed weight: Rob Van Dam: 235 lb (107 kg); Total: 455 lb (206 kg); Sabu: 220 lb (100 kg)
- Former members: Bill Alfonso (manager)
- Debut: 1996
- Disbanded: 2019
- Years active: 1996–1999; 2005–2007; 2010–2019
- Trained by: The Sheik

Rob Van Dam and Sabu were a tag team who competed in Extreme Championship Wrestling (ECW) and WWE's ECW brand. While teaming in the original ECW, the duo was managed by Bill Alfonso.

== History ==
=== Extreme Championship Wrestling (1996–2000) ===
Rob Van Dam and Sabu first met in December 1989 and became close friends. The pair started out as enemies in Extreme Championship Wrestling (ECW), when Rob Van Dam debuted in 1996. Both men were trained by Sabu's uncle, The Sheik, and fans wanted to see them face each other since they both utilized high-flying, daredevil techniques.

In 1996, they eventually became a tag team as they went for the ECW World Tag Team Championship. At ECW Barely Legal, Bill Alfonso betrayed Taz and joined Van Dam and Sabu. Four months later, Van Dam helped Sabu beat Terry Funk in a barbed wire match to capture the ECW World Heavyweight Championship. After Sabu lost the belt in a three-way dance with Terry Funk and Shane Douglas at ECW Hardcore Heaven, Sabu and Van Dam joined Jerry Lawler in his crusade to "kill" ECW. When the crusade ultimately failed, Sabu eventually set his sights on Bam Bam Bigelow's ECW World Television Championship. So Bill Alfonso helped schedule a match between Bigelow and Van Dam, so that the latter could "soften" Bigelow before Sabu would face him at Wrestlepalooza 1998. When Sabu interfered in the match, however, he "accidentally" helped Van Dam win the title, so the two then faced each other at Wrestlepalooza. The match ended in a 30-minute draw, preventing title from changing hands. A month later, the two captured the ECW World Tag Team Championship when they defeated Chris Candido and Lance Storm. As champions, Sabu and Van Dam took on all challengers including Jinsei Shinzaki and Hayabusa at Heat Wave 1998 in Dayton, Ohio. They lost the titles to The Dudley Boyz in October 1998; however, yet they went on to win them back from the Dudleyz in December at ECW/FMW Supershow.

After they lost the titles again to The Dudley Boyz, The Impact Players formed and started to attack Sabu and Van Dam. When Sabu broke his jaw, the Impact Players had him eventually banned because of his injury and because he was too "dangerous" or "violent." Sabu returned, and after his loss to Justin Credible at Anarchy Rulz 1999, Sabu started to attack Van Dam because he was still jealous that Van Dam was the ECW World Television Champion, and they would face each other at Guilty as Charged 2000. Sabu proclaimed before the match that if he could not win the belt, he would leave ECW. That night, Van Dam defeated Sabu with the Five Star Frog Splash, forcing Sabu to leave the company.

=== World Wrestling Entertainment (2005–2007) ===
Several years after ECW folded, Rob Van Dam and Sabu reunited at World Wrestling Entertainment (WWE) produced ECW One Night Stand in 2005, when Van Dam helped Sabu defeat another former ECW wrestler, Rhyno. When ECW became the third WWE brand (to Raw and SmackDown), Van Dam and Sabu became a major part of the show and teamed on several occasions, including an Extreme Rules match against Test and Mike Knox on September 5, 2006. The team also became part of ECW Originals stable in 2006 which feuded with The New Breed. On March 31, 2007, Van Dam and Sabu inducted The Original Sheik into the WWE Hall of Fame. The following night, at WrestleMania 23, ECW Originals defeated The New Breed but continued battling them into spring. In May 2007, Sabu was released from WWE. Van Dam's WWE contract expired in June 2007, and he chose not to renew it.

=== Total Nonstop Action Wrestling / Impact Wrestling (2010, 2019) ===
On August 8, 2010, Sabu returned to Total Nonstop Action Wrestling (TNA) at Hardcore Justice, where he was defeated by Rob Van Dam in the main event of the evening. Van Dam and Sabu both then went on to join EV 2.0, a stable consisting of former ECW wrestlers. On the October 21 episode of TNA Impact!, Van Dam and Sabu were defeated in a tag team match by Beer Money, Inc. (James Storm and Robert Roode), after Sabu accidentally hit his own partner with a chair. After the match, Van Dam and Sabu began shoving each other, before being broken up by the rest of EV 2.0. In November 2010, Sabu was released from TNA, as was Van Dam in March 2013.

On February 8, 2019, it was revealed that both Rob Van Dam and Sabu would return to TNA, now named Impact Wrestling, at their following pay-per-view United We Stand. At the event on April 4, 2019, the team tagged for the first time since 2015, facing Lucha Bros (Pentagón Jr. and Fénix). Their last match was against The North on the June 6 episode of Impact!.

Sabu passed away in 2025.

== Championships and accomplishments ==
- Extreme Championship Wrestling
  - ECW World Heavyweight Championship (1 time) – Sabu
  - ECW World Television Championship (1 time) – Rob Van Dam
  - FTW Heavyweight Championship (1 time) – Sabu
  - ECW World Tag Team Championship (2 times)
