= 1998 in professional wrestling =

1998 in professional wrestling describes the year's events in the world of professional wrestling.

== List of notable promotions ==
These promotions held notable events in 1998.

Promotion Name	Abbreviation	Notes
All Japan Pro Wrestling	AJPW	
Catch Wrestling Association	CWA	
Consejo Mundial de Lucha Libre	CMLL	
Extreme Championship Wrestling	ECW	
Frontier Martial-Arts Wrestling	FMW	
International Wrestling Revolution Group	IWRG	
Lucha Libre AAA Worldwide	AAA	The "AAA" abbreviation has been used since the mid-1990s and had previously stood for the promotion's original name Asistencia Asesoría y Administración.
New Japan Pro-Wrestling	NJPW	
World Championship Wrestling	WCW	
World Wrestling Council	WWC	
World Wrestling Federation	WWF	

== Calendar of notable shows ==
=== January ===
Date	Promotion(s)	Event	Location	Main Event
January 4	NJPW	Final Power Hall in Tokyo Dome	Tokyo, Japan	Kensuke Sasaki (c) defeated Keiji Mutoh in a singles match for the IWGP Heavyweight Championship
January 10	ECW	House Party	Philadelphia, Pennsylvania, United States	The Sandman defeated Sabu in a Stairway to Hell match
January 18	WWF	Royal Rumble	San Jose, California, United States	Shawn Michaels (c) defeated The Undertaker in a Casket match for the WWF World Heavyweight Championship
January 24	WCW: WCW; nWo	Souled Out	Dayton, Ohio, United States	Lex Luger defeated Randy Savage by submission in a singles match
January 31	ECW	Hostile City Showdown	Philadelphia, Pennsylvania, United States	Rob Van Dam and Sabu vs. The Dudley Boyz (Buh Buh Ray Dudley and D-Von Dudley) vs. The Gangstanators (John Kronus and New Jack) vs. The Sandman and Tommy Dreamer in a Four-Way Dance
(c) – denotes defending champion(s)

=== February ===
Date	Promotion(s)	Event	Location	Main Event
February 15	WWF	No Way Out of Texas: In Your House	Houston, Texas, United States	Cactus Jack, Chainsaw Charlie, Owen Hart and Stone Cold Steve Austin defeated The New Age Outlaws (Billy Gunn and Road Dogg), Savio Vega and Triple H in a Non-sanctioned eight-man tag team match
February 21	ECW	Cyberslam	Philadelphia, Pennsylvania, United States	Shane Douglas and Bam Bam Bigelow vs. Rob Van Dam and Sabu in a tag team match
February 22	WCW: WCW; nWo	SuperBrawl VIII	Daly City, California, United States	Sting vs. Hollywood Hogan in a singles match for the vacant WCW World Heavyweight Championship
February 28	NWA	Third Annual Eddie Gilbert Memorial Show	Philadelphia, Pennsylvania, United States	Doug and Tommy Gilbert vs. Buddy Landell and Dory Funk Jr. in a tag team match
(c) – denotes defending champion(s)

=== March ===
Date	Promotion(s)	Event	Location	Main Event
March 1	AAA	Rey de Reyes	Naucalpan, Mexico	Perro Aguayo defeated Latin Lover, Cibernético and Octagón in a 1998 Rey de Reyes final
March 1	ECW	Living Dangerously	Asbury Park, New Jersey, United States	Al Snow and Lance Storm defeated Shane Douglas and Chris Candido in a tag team match
March 15	WCW: WCW; nWo	Uncensored	Mobile, Alabama, United States	Hollywood Hogan fought Randy Savage to a no-contest in a Steel cage match
March 20	CMLL	Homenaje a Salvador Lutteroth	Mexico City, Mexico	Emilio Charles Jr. defeated El Satánico in a Lucha de Apuesta, Hair vs. Hair match
March 29	WWF	WrestleMania XIV	Boston, Massachusetts, United States	Stone Cold Steve Austin defeated Shawn Michaels (c) in a Singles match for the WWF Championship with Mike Tyson as special outside enforcer
(c) – denotes defending champion(s)

=== April ===
Date	Promotion(s)	Event	Location	Main Event
April 4	WWF	Mayhem in Manchester	Manchester, England, United Kingdom	Stone Cold Steve Austin (c) defeated Triple H in a Singles match for the WWF Championship; The Undertaker defeated Kane in a Singles match
April 19	WCW: WCW; nWo	Spring Stampede	Denver, Colorado, United States	Randy Savage defeated Sting (c) in a No Disqualification match for the WCW World Heavyweight Championship
April 24	CMLL	42. Aniversario de Arena México	Mexico City, Mexico	Gran Markus Jr. defeated Brazo de Oro in a Best two-out-of-three falls Lucha de Apuestas hair vs. hair match
April 26	WWF	Unforgiven: In Your House	Greensboro, North Carolina, United States	Dude Love defeated Stone Cold Steve Austin (c) by disqualification in a Singles match for the WWF Championship
April 29	N/A	First Annual Brian Pillman Memorial Show	Norwood, Ohio, United States	Chris Benoit defeated Chris Jericho in a Singles match
April 30	FMW	FMW 9th Anniversary Show	Tokyo, Japan	Hayabusa defeated Mr. Gannosuke (c) in a Singles match for the FMW Brass Knuckles Heavyweight Championship and the FMW Independent Heavyweight Championship
(c) – denotes defending champion(s)

=== May ===
Date	Promotion(s)	Event	Location	Main Event
May 1	AJPW	AJPW 25th Anniversary	Tokyo, Japan	Toshiaki Kawada defeated Mitsuharu Misawa in a Triple Crown title match
May 3	ECW	Wrestlepalooza	Marietta, Georgia, United States	Shane Douglas (c) defeated Al Snow in a Singles match for the ECW World Heavyweight Championship
May 14	ECW	It Ain't Seinfeld	Queens, New York, United States	The Dudley Boyz (Buh Buh Ray Dudley, D-Von Dudley and Big Dick Dudley) defeated the Sandman, Spike Dudley and Tommy Dreamer by pinfall in a Six-man tag team match
May 16	ECW	A Matter of Respect	Philadelphia, Pennsylvania, United States	Spike Dudley, The Sandman and Tommy Dreamer defeated The Dudley Boyz (Buh Buh Ray Dudley, D-Von Dudley and Big Dick Dudley) in a Stairway to Hell match
May 17	WCW: WCW; nWo	Slamboree	Worcester, Massachusetts, United States	Sting and The Giant defeated The Outsiders (Kevin Nash and Scott Hall) (c) in a Tag team match for the WCW World Tag Team Championship
May 19	FMW	Neo 1998: Day 1	Tokyo, Japan	Hayabusa vs. Masato Tanaka in a Singles match
May 31	WWF	Over the Edge: In Your House	Milwaukee, Wisconsin, United States	Stone Cold Steve Austin (c) defeated Dude Love in a Falls Count Anywhere match for the WWF Championship with Mr. McMahon as special guest referee
(c) – denotes defending champion(s)

=== June ===
Date	Promotion(s)	Event	Location	Main Event
June 7	AAA	Triplemanía VI	Chihuahua City, Chihuahua, Mexico	Kick Boxer defeated Heavy Metal in a Steel cage match, Lucha de Apuestas, "Hair of Pepe Casas vs. Hair of El Tirantes" match
June 11	N/A	Third Annual Ilio DiPaolo Memorial Show	Buffalo, New York, United States	Kevin Nash and Diamond Dallas Page defeated Hollywood Hogan and Bret Hart in a tag team
June 14	WCW: WCW; nWo	The Great American Bash	Baltimore, Maryland, United States	Sting defeated The Giant in a Singles match for control of the WCW World Tag Team Championship
June 19	FMW	King of Fight 1998: Day 2	Tokyo, Japan	Hayabusa, Hisakatsu Oya, Ricky Fuji and Daisuke Ikeda vs. Team No Respect (Kodo Fuyuki, Koji Nakagawa, Gedo and Yukihiro Kanemura) in four-man tag team match
June 28	WWF	King of the Ring	Pittsburgh, Pennsylvania, United States	Kane defeated Stone Cold Steve Austin (c) in a First Blood match for the WWF Championship
(c) – denotes defending champion(s)

=== July ===
Date	Promotion(s)	Event	Location	Main Event
July 10	FMW	King of Fight II 1998: Day 2	Tokyo, Japan	Hayabusa, Hisakatsu Oya, Ricky Fuji and Daisuke Ikeda vs. Team No Respect (Kodo Fuyuki, Koji Nakagawa, Jado and Gedo) in an eight-man tag team match
July 12	WCW: WCW; nWo	Bash at the Beach	San Diego, California, United States	Hollywood Hogan and Dennis Rodman defeated Diamond Dallas Page and Karl Malone in a tag team match
July 18	CMLL	Ruleta de la Muerte	Mexico City, Mexico	El Hijo del Santo defeated Guerrero del Futuro in Lucha de Apuesta, mask vs. hair match
July 26	WWF	Fully Loaded: In Your House	Fresno, California, United States	Stone Cold Steve Austin and The Undertaker defeated Kane and Mankind (c) in a tag team match for the WWF Tag Team Championship
(c) – denotes defending champion(s)

=== August ===
Date	Promotion(s)	Event	Location	Main Event
August 1	WWC	WWC 25th Aniversario	San Juan, Puerto Rico	Ricky Santana defeated El Texano in a hair vs. hair match
August 2	ECW	Heat Wave	Dayton, Ohio, United States	Tommy Dreamer, The Sandman and Spike Dudley defeated The Dudleys (Buh Buh Ray Dudley, D-Von Dudley and Big Dick Dudley) in a Street Fight
August 8	WCW: WCW; nWo	Road Wild	Sturgis, South Dakota, United States	Diamond Dallas Page and Jay Leno defeated Hollywood Hogan and Eric Bischoff in a tag team match
August 11	FMW	Atsushi Onita Presents Liar, Liar	Tokyo, Japan	Atsushi Onita, Mr. Pogo, Shoichi Arai and Yoshinori Sasaki defeated Go Ito and Team No Respect (Kodo Fuyuki, Koji Nakagawa and Yukihiro Kanemura) in a Shoichi Arai Presidency vs. Hosakas and Kurodas Freedom Weapons Death Match
August 13	N/A	Second Annual Plum Mariko Memorial Show	Tokyo, Japan	Mayumi Ozaki and Devil Masami defeated Cutie Suzuki and Dynamite Kansai in a tag team match
August 14	CMLL	International Gran Prix	Mexico City, Mexico	Apolo Dantés defeated Rayo de Jalisco Jr. in a 1998 International Gran Prix final match
August 22	FMW	Welcome to the Darkside	Tokyo, Japan	Koji Nakagawa defeated Darkside Hayabusa in a Singles match
August 30	WWF	SummerSlam	New York City, New York, United States	Stone Cold Steve Austin (c) defeated The Undertaker in a Singles match for the WWE Championship
(c) – denotes defending champion(s)

=== September ===
Date	Promotion(s)	Event	Location	Main Event
September 8	FMW	Super Dynamism 1998: Day 11	Tokyo, Japan	Hayabusa and Daisuke Ikeda vs. Kodo Fuyuki and Yukihiro Kanemura in a tag team match
September 13	WCW: WCW; nWo	Fall Brawl	Winston-Salem, North Carolina, United States	Team WCW (Diamond Dallas Page, Roddy Piper and The Warrior) defeated nWo Hollywood (Hollywood Hogan, Bret Hart and Stevie Ray) and nWo Wolfpac (Kevin Nash, Sting and Lex Luger) in a WarGames match
September 18	AAA	Verano de Escándalo	Ciudad Madero, Tamaulipas, Mexico	Heavy Metal and Blue Demon Jr. defeated Kick Boxer and Abismo Negro in a Steel cage match
September 18	CMLL	CMLL 65th Anniversary Show	Mexico City, Mexico	Los Hermanos Dinamita (Cien Caras and Máscara Año 2000) and Emilio Charles Jr. defeated Los Boricuas (Kevin Quinn, La Boricua and Miguel Perez, Jr.) in a Best two out of three falls tag team match
September 19	ECW	UltraClash	Philadelphia, Pennsylvania, United States	Rob Van Dam and Sabu and Masato Tanaka fought the Triple Threat (Bam Bam Bigelow, Chris Candido, and Shane Douglas) to a no contest
September 27	WWF	Breakdown: In Your House	Hamilton, Ontario, Canada	Kane and The Undertaker defeated Stone Cold Steve Austin (c) in a Triple threat match for the WWF Championship
(c) – denotes defending champion(s)

=== October ===
Date	Promotion(s)	Event	Location	Main Event
October 6	FMW	Flashover 1998: Day 10	Tokyo, Japan	Hayabusa vs. Koji Nakagawa in a Singles match
October 18	WWF	Judgment Day: In Your House	Rosemont, Illinois, United States	Kane vs. The Undertaker ended in a double pinfall in a Singles match for the vacant WWF Championship with Stone Cold Steve Austin as special guest referee
October 25	WCW: WCW; nWo	Halloween Havoc	Paradise, Nevada, United States	Goldberg (c) defeated Diamond Dallas Page in a Singles match for the WCW World Heavyweight Championship
(c) – denotes defending champion(s)

=== November ===
Date	Promotion(s)	Event	Location	Main Event
November 1	ECW	November to Remember	New Orleans, Louisiana, United States	New Triple Threat (Sabu, Rob Van Dam and Taz) defeated The Triple Threat (Shane Douglas, Bam Bam Bigelow and Chris Candido)
November 15	WWF	Survivor Series	St. Louis, Missouri, United States	The Rock defeated Mankind by submission in a Tournament final match for the vacant WWF Championship
November 20	FMW	Scramble Survivor 1998: Day 6	Yokohama, Japan	Hayabusa vs. Kodo Fuyuki in a Singles match
November 22	WCW: WCW; nWo	World War 3	Auburn Hills, Michigan, United States	Diamond Dallas Page (c) defeated Bret Hart in a Singles match for the WCW United States Heavyweight Championship
(c) – denotes defending champion(s)

=== December ===
Date	Promotion(s)	Event	Location	Main Event
December 6	WWF	WWF Capital Carnage	London, England, United Kingdom	Stone Cold Steve Austin defeated Kane, Mankind and The Undertaker in a Fatal 4-Way match with Gerald Brisco as special guest referee
December 12	ECW; FMW	ECW/FMW Supershow I	Tokyo, Japan	Rob Van Dam and Sabu defeated Hayabusa and Tommy Dreamer by pinfall in a tag team match
December 13	ECW; FMW	ECW/FMW Supershow II	Tokyo, Japan	Rob Van Dam and Sabu defeated The Dudley Boyz (Buh Buh Ray Dudley and D-Von Dudley) (c) by pinfall in a Tag team match for the ECW World Tag Team Championship
December 13	AAA	Guerra de Titanes	Chihuahua City, Chihuahua, Mexico	Octagón and Heavy Metal defeated Pentagón and Kick Boxer in a Steel Cage match
December 13	WWF	Rock Bottom: In Your House	Vancouver, British Columbia, Canada	Stone Cold Steve Austin defeated The Undertaker in a Buried Alive match for the right to compete in the 1999 Royal Rumble match
December 19	CWA	Euro Catch Festival	Bremen, Germany	Rambo defeated Big Titan in Round 6 in a Singles match for the vacant CWA World Heavyweight Championship
December 20	IWRG	Arena Naucalpan 21st Anniversary Show	Naucalpan, State of Mexico, Mexico	Mega defeated Judo Suwa in a Ruleta de la Muerte final, Lucha de Apuestas, mask vs. hair match
December 26	various	Jaguar Yokota Retirement Show	Tokyo, Japan	Devil Masami defeated Jaguar Yokota
December 27	WCW: WCW; nWo	Starrcade	Washington, D.C., United States	Kevin Nash defeated Goldberg (c) in a No Disqualification match for the WCW World Heavyweight Championship
(c) – denotes defending champion(s)

== Accomplishments and tournaments ==
=== AAA ===
Tournaments	Winner	Date won	Notes
Rey de Reyes	Perro Aguayo	March 1	

=== AJW ===
Accomplishment	Winner	Date won	Notes
Japan Grand Prix 1998	Manami Toyota	August 9	
Tag League The Best 1998	Momoe Nakanishi and Nanae Takahashi	November 22	

=== AJPW ===
Tournaments	Winner	Date won	Notes
Asunaro Cup 1998	Jun Akiyama & Takao Omori	January 23	
Champion Carnival	Mitsuharu Misawa	April 18	
World Junior Heavyweight Title League	Yoshinari Ogawa	July 19	
Real World Tag League	Jun Akiyama & Kenta Kobashi	December 5	

=== JWP ===
Accomplishment	Winner	Date won	Notes
Blue Star Cup 1998	Kayoko Haruyama		
All Generation Tournament	Carlos Amano	May 17	

=== NJPW ===
Tournaments	Winner	Date won	Notes
Final Inoki Tournament	Don Frye	April 4	
Best of the Super Juniors V	Koji Kanemoto	June 3	
IWGP Tag Team Title Tournament	Hiroyoshi Tenzan & Masahiro Chono	June 5	
IWGP Junior Heavyweight Tag Title League	Shinjiro Otani & Tatsuhito Takaiwa	August 8	This tournament was to crown the inaugural IWGP Junior Heavyweight Tag Team Champions
G1 Climax 8	Shinya Hashimoto	August 2	
WCW World Tag Title Contenders League	Kensuke Sasaki & Yuji Nagata	September 21	Sasaki & Nagata never actually received their title shot
Super Grade Tag League VIII	Keiji Muto & Satoshi Kojima	December 6	

=== WCW ===
Accomplishment	Winner	Date won	Notes
World War 3	Kevin Nash	November 22	

=== WWF ===
Accomplishment	Winner	Date won	Notes
Royal Rumble	Stone Cold Steve Austin	January 18	
King of the Ring	Ken Shamrock	June 28	
WWF Brawl for All	Bart Gunn	August 24	This was a shoot fighting tournament, rather than traditional wrestling matches
WWF Intercontinental Championship Tournament	Ken Shamrock	October 12	
Deadly Games WWF Championship Tournament	The Rock	November 15	

== Awards and honors ==
=== Pro Wrestling Illustrated ===
Category	Winner
PWI Wrestler of the Year	Stone Cold Steve Austin
PWI Tag Team of the Year	The New Age Outlaws (Road Dogg and Billy Gunn)
PWI Match of the Year	The Undertaker vs. Mankind (King of the Ring)
PWI Feud of the Year	Vince McMahon vs. Stone Cold Steve Austin
PWI Most Popular Wrestler of the Year	Stone Cold Steve Austin
PWI Most Hated Wrestler of the Year	Hollywood Hogan
PWI Comeback of the Year	X-Pac
PWI Most Improved Wrestler of the Year	Booker T
PWI Most Inspirational Wrestler of the Year	Goldberg
PWI Rookie of the Year	Bill Goldberg
PWI Lifetime Achievement	Bobo Brazil
PWI Editor's Award	Paul Bearer

=== Wrestling Observer Newsletter ===
==== Wrestling Observer Newsletter Hall of Fame ====
Inductee
Dos Caras

==== Wrestling Observer Newsletter awards ====
Category	Winner
Wrestler of the Year	Stone Cold Steve Austin
Most Outstanding	Koji Kanemoto
Best Box Office Draw	Stone Cold Steve Austin
Feud of the Year	Stone Cold Steve Austin vs. Vince McMahon
Tag Team of the Year	Shinjiro Otani and Tatsuhito Takaiwa
Most Improved	The Rock
Best on Interviews	Stone Cold Steve Austin

== Title changes ==
=== ECW ===
ECW World Heavyweight Championship
Incoming champion – Shane Douglas
Date	Winner	Event/Show	Note(s)
No title changes

ECW FTW Heavyweight Championship
(Title created)
Unsanctioned championship
Date	Winner	Event/Show	Note(s)
May 14	Taz	It Ain't Seinfeld	Taz introduced the championship during a storyline.
December 19	Sabu	Hardcore TV #296	

ECW World Television Championship
Incoming champion – Taz
Date	Winner	Event/Show	Note(s)
March 1	Bam Bam Bigelow	Living Dangerously	
April 4	Rob Van Dam	Hardcore TV #259	

ECW World Tag Team Championship
Incoming champions – Chris Candido and Lance Storm
Date	Winner	Event/Show	Note(s)
June 27	Rob Van Dam and Sabu	Hardcore TV #271	
October 24	The Dudley Boyz (Buh Buh Ray and D-Von Dudley)	Hardcore TV #288	
November 1	Balls Mahoney and Masato Tanaka	November to Remember	
November 6	The Dudley Boyz (Buh Buh Ray and D-Von Dudley)	Hardcore TV #290	
December 13	Sabu and Rob Van Dam	ECW/FMW Supershow II	

=== FMW ===
FMW Double Championship
Incoming champion – Masato Tanaka
Date	Winner	Event/Show	Note(s)
January 6	Mr. Gannosuke	New Year Generation Tour	
April 30	Hayabusa	9th Anniversary Show	
November 20	Kodo Fuyuki	Scramble Survivor Tour	

FMW Brass Knuckles Tag Team Championship
Incoming champions – ZEN/Team No Respect (Mr. Gannosuke and Yukihiro Kanemura)
Date	Winner	Event/Show	Note(s)
March 29	Team No Respect (Kodo Fuyuki and Hido)	Winning Road tour	
April 17	Hayabusa and Masato Tanaka	Fuyuki Army	
May 27	Team No Respect (Kodo Fuyuki and Yukihiro Kanemura)	Neo FMW	
October 26	Hayabusa and Daisuke Ikeda	Fuyuki Army	

FMW World Street Fight 6-Man Tag Team Championship
Incoming champions – Hayabusa, Masato Tanaka and Hisakatsu Oya
Date	Winner	Event/Show	Note(s)
January 16	Team No Respect (Mr. Gannosuke, Yukihiro Kanemura and Jado)	FMW	
February 13	ZEN (Atsushi Onita, Koji Nakagawa and Tetsuhiro Kuroda)	FMW	
May 5	Team No Respect (Kodo Fuyuki, Yukihiro Kanemura and Hido)	Neo FMW tour	
June 1	Vacant	Neo FMW Tour	
June 1	Team No Respect (Atsushi Onita, Tetsuhiro Kuroda and Hido)	Neo FMW tour	
November 20	Vacant	N/A	

=== NJPW ===
IWGP Heavyweight Championship
Incoming champion – Kensuke Sasaki
Date	Winner	Event/Show	Note(s)
April 4	Tatsumi Fujinami	Antonio Inoki Retirement Show	
August 8	Masahiro Chono	Rising the Next Generation in Osaka Dome	
September 21	Vacant	N/A	
September 23	Scott Norton	Big Wednesday	

IWGP Tag Team Championship
Incoming champions – Keiji Mutoh and Masahiro Chono
Date	Winner	Event/Show	Note(s)
April 21	Vacant	N/A	
June 5	Cho-Ten (Hiroyoshi Tenzan and Masahiro Chono)	Live event	
July 15	Genichiro Tenryu and Shiro Koshinaka	Summer Struggle 1998	

IWGP Junior Heavyweight Championship
Incoming champion – Shinjiro Otani
Date	Winner	Event/Show	Note(s)
February 7	Jushin Thunder Liger	Live event	

IWGP Junior Heavyweight Tag Team Championship
(Title created)
Date	Winner	Event/Show	Note(s)
August 8	Shinjiro Otani and Tatsuhito Takaiwa	Rising the Next Generations in Osaka Dome	

=== WCW ===
WCW World Heavyweight Championship
Incoming champion – Sting
Date	Winner	Event/Show	Note(s)
January 8	Vacated	Thunder	Vacated due to the controversial ending of Starrcade 1997
February 22	Sting	SuperBrawl VIII	
April 19	Randy Savage	Spring Stampede	This was a No disqualification match
April 20	Hollywood Hogan	Nitro	
July 6	Goldberg	Nitro	
December 27	Kevin Nash	Starrcade	

WCW Cruiserweight Championship
Incoming champion – Ultimate Dragon
Date	Winner	Event/Show	Note(s)
January 8	Juventud Guerrera	Thunder	
January 15	Rey Misterio, Jr.	Thunder	
January 24	Chris Jericho	Souled Out	
May 17	Dean Malenko	Slamboree	Malenko won a battle royal earlier in the night, wearing a mask as Ciclope, to earn a title shot
June 11	Vacant	Thunder	Vacated due to Malenko not winning the title shot as himself
June 14	Chris Jericho	The Great American Bash	
August 8	Juventud Guerrera	Road Wild	Dean Malenko was the special guest referee
September 14	Billy Kidman	Nitro	
November 16	Juventud Guerrera	Nitro	
November 22	Billy Kidman	World War 3	

WCW United States Heavyweight Championship
Incoming champion – Diamond Dallas Page
Date	Winner	Event/Show	Note(s)
April 19	Raven	Spring Stampede	
April 20	Goldberg	Nitro	
July 6	Vacant	Nitro	Vacated due to Goldberg winning the WCW World Heavyweight Championship
July 20	Bret Hart	Nitro	
August 10	Lex Luger	Nitro	
August 11	Bret Hart	Thunder	Aired on tape delay on August 13.
October 26	Diamond Dallas Page	Nitro	
November 30	Bret Hart	Nitro	

WCW Women's Cruiserweight Championship
Incoming champion – Sugar Sato
Date	Winner	Event/Show	Note(s)
April 3	Retired	GAEA Full Bloom	

WCW World Television Championship
Incoming champion – Booker T
Date	Winner	Event/Show	Note(s)
February 16	Rick Martel	Nitro	
February 22	Booker T	SuperBrawl VIII	
April 30	Chris Benoit	House show	
May 1	Booker T	House show	
May 2	Chris Benoit	House show	
May 3	Booker T	House show	
May 4	Fit Finlay	Nitro	
June 14	Booker T	The Great American Bash	
July 14	Stevie Ray	House show	
August 10	Chris Jericho	Nitro	
November 30	Konnan	Nitro	
December 28	Scott Steiner	Nitro	

WCW World Tag Team Championship
Incoming champions – The Steiner Brothers (Rick and Scott Steiner)
Date	Winner	Event/Show	Note(s)
January 12	The Outsiders (Kevin Nash and Scott Hall)	Nitro	
February 9	The Steiner Brothers (Rick and Scott Steiner)	Nitro	
February 22	The Outsiders (Kevin Nash and Scott Hall)	SuperBrawl VIII	
May 17	Sting and The Giant	Slamboree	
June 2	Vacant	Thunder	Aired on tape delay on June 4. Vacated due to Sting joining the NWO Wolfpac.
June 14	Sting and Kevin Nash	The Great American Bash	
July 20	Scott Hall and The Giant	Nitro	
October 25	Rick Steiner and Kenny Kaos	Halloween Havoc	

=== WWF ===
WWF World Heavyweight Championship
Incoming champion – Shawn Michaels
Date	Winner	Event/Show	Note(s)
March 29	Stone Cold Steve Austin	WrestleMania XIV	Mike Tyson was the special outside enforcer.
June 28	Kane	King of the Ring	This was a First Blood match
June 29	Stone Cold Steve Austin	Raw Is War	The title was renamed to WWF Championship
September 27	Vacant	Breakdown: In Your House	This was a triple threat match also involving The Undertaker and Kane
November 15	The Rock	Survivor Series	Defeated Mankind in a tournament final
December 29	Mankind	Raw Is War	Aired on tape delay on January 4.

WWF Intercontinental Championship
Incoming champion – The Rock
Date	Winner	Event/Show	Note(s)
August 30	Triple H	SummerSlam	This was a ladder match
October 9	Vacant	N/A	Vacated due to injury.
October 12	Ken Shamrock	Raw Is War	Defeated X-Pac in a tournament final

WWF Light Heavyweight Championship
Incoming champion – Taka Michinoku
Date	Winner	Event/Show	Note(s)
October 18	Christian	Judgment Day: In Your House	
November 17	Gillberg	Raw Is War	Aired on tape delay on November 23.

WWF Women's Championship
(Title reactivated)
Date	Winner	Event/Show	Note(s)
September 15	Jacqueline	Raw Is War	Aired on tape delay on September 21.
November 15	Sable	Survivor Series	Shane McMahon was the special guest referee

WWF European Championship
Incoming champion – Triple H
Date	Winner	Event/Show	Note(s)
January 20	Owen Hart	Raw Is War	Aired on tape delay on January 26.
March 16	Triple H	Raw Is War	
July 14	D'Lo Brown	Raw Is War	Aired on tape delay on July 20.
September 15	X-Pac	Raw Is War	Aired on tape delay on September 21.
September 29	D'Lo Brown	Raw Is War	Aired on tape delay on October 5.
October 18	X-Pac	Judgment Day: In Your House	

WWF Tag Team Championship
Incoming champions – The New Age Outlaws (Billy Gunn and Road Dogg)
Date	Winner	Event/Show	Note(s)
March 29	Cactus Jack and Chainsaw Charlie	WrestleMania XIV	
March 30	The New Age Outlaws (Billy Gunn and Road Dogg)	Raw Is War	Aired on tape delay on April 6.
July 13	Kane and Mankind	Raw Is War	
July 26	Stone Cold Steve Austin and The Undertaker	Fully Loaded: In Your House	
August 10	Kane and Mankind	Raw Is War	This was a four-way match also involving The New Age Outlaws and D'Lo Brown & The Rock.
August 30	The New Age Outlaws (Billy Gunn and Road Dogg)	SummerSlam	
December 14	The Corporation (Big Boss Man and Ken Shamrock)	Raw Is War	

WWF Hardcore Championship
(Title created)
Date	Winner	Event/Show	Note(s)
November 2	Mankind	Raw Is War	Mankind was awarded the title by Vince McMahon
November 30	Big Boss Man	Raw Is War	This was a ladder march
December 15	Road Dogg	Raw Is War	Aired on tape delay on December 21.

== Births ==
- January 2 – Takuho Kato
- January 12 – Rayne Leverkusen
- January 16 – Dion Lennox
- January 20 – Koguma
- February 1 – Action Andretti
- February 4 – Kaisei Takechi
- March 24 – Maika
- April 22
  - Oba Femi
  - Malik Blade
- April 27 – Arisu Endo
- May 17 – Ancham
- May 20 – Jasper Troy
- June 1 – Megan Bayne
- June 11 – Hank Walker
- June 18 – Masha Slamovich
- July 15 – Anna Jay
- July 19 – Lola Vice
- July 24 – Daiju Wakamatsu
- July 28 – Jazmyn Nyx
- August 4 – Mariah May
- September 14 – Utami Hayashishita
- September 17 – Towa Iwasaki
- October 12 – Connor Mills
- October 22 – Kelani Jordan
- November 3 – Alec Price
- November 7 – Ryohei Oiwa
- November 8 – Soma Watanabe
- November 16 - Luca Crusifino
- November 23 – Rina Shingaki
- November 27 – Suzume
- December 19 – Naka Shuma
- December 22 – Keanu Carver
- December 24 – Kyle Fletcher
- December 26 – Adriana Rizzo

== Debuts ==
- A.J. Styles
- Amazing Red
- Chuck Palumbo
- Rodney Mack
- Sal E. Graziano
- Cliff Compton
- Tony Mamaluke
- Kazunari Murakami
- Tomoka Isozaki (All Japan Women's)
- January 23 - Tomiko Sai and Kayoko Haruyama
- January 28 - Kenji Fukimoto and Akira Raijin
- January 31 – Thanomsak Toba
- February 5 - MAX Miyazawa
- February 7 - Ryuji Hijikata
- March 1 - Kengo Takai
- April 13 - Vince McMahon
- April 30 - Místico
- May 15 - Frankie Kazarian
- June 19 - Bobby Roode
- August 9 - Ayako Hamada
- August 16 - Junko Yagi
- August 21 – Kurt Angle
- August 28 - Naomichi Marufuji
- September 6 – Quiet Storm
- September 13 - Tigre Uno
- September 15 - Mika Harigai (All Japan Women's)
- September 25 - Low Ki
- October - Kongo Kong
- October 25 - Genkai
- November 29 - Takashi Uwano
- December 14 – Faby Apache
- December 16 - Daisaku Shimada

== Retirements ==
- Austin Idol (1972–1998)
- Antonio Inoki (September 30, 1960–April 4, 1998) (returned to wrestling in 2000 and retired on December 30, 2001)
- Marcus Laurinaitis (1987–1998)
- Joey Maggs (1987–1998)
- Rick Martel (1973–1998)
- Shawn Michaels (1984-March 28, 1998) (returned to wrestling in 2002 and retired in 2010)
- John Nord (1984-1998)
- The Patriot (wrestler) (1988-1998)
- Sgt. Craig Pittman (1993-1998) (returned to wrestling for two matches in 2011)
- Paul Roma (1984–1998) (returned to wrestling in 2006)
- The Sheik (wrestler) (1947-1998)
- Mark Starr (1986–1998)
- Pez Whatley (1973-1998)

== Deaths ==
- January 20 – Bobo Brazil, 73
- February 4 - Pedro Martinez (wrestling), 82
- February 15 – Louie Spicolli, 27
- April 6 - Stanley Radwan, 89
- June 2 – Junkyard Dog, 45
- July 1 - Toyonobori, 67
- July 20 - June Byers, 76
- August 17 – Terry Garvin, 61
- August 18 – Shane Shamrock, 23
- August 30 – Gorilla Pogi, 96
- November 6 – Sky Low Low, 70
- November 29 – Giant Haystacks, 51
- December 9 - Archie Moore, 84
- December 15 – Brady Boone, 40
- December 30 - Sam Muchnick, 93
- December 31 - Frank Valois, 77

== See also ==
- List of WCW pay-per-view events
- List of WWF pay-per-view events
- List of FMW supercards and pay-per-view events
- List of ECW supercards and pay-per-view events
