= Heat Wave (1998) =

1998 Extreme Championship Wrestling pay-per-view event

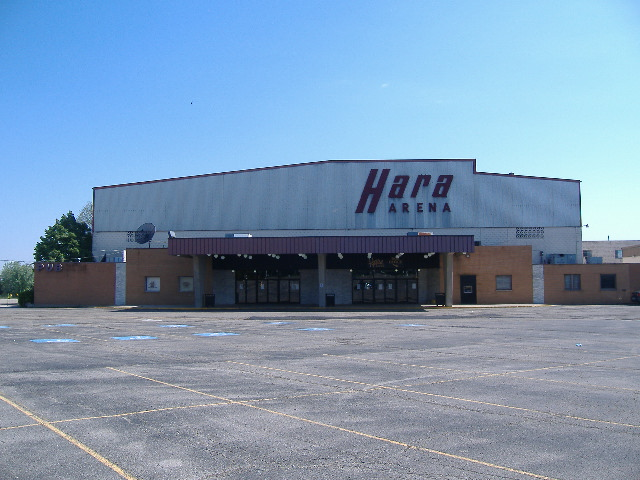
- The Hara Arena.
- Promotion: Extreme Championship Wrestling
- Date: August 2, 1998
- City: Dayton, Ohio
- Venue: Hara Arena
- Attendance: 4,400
- Buy rate: 72,000

Pay-per-view chronology
← Previous; Wrestlepalooza	Next → November to Remember

Heat Wave chronology
← Previous; 1997	Next → 1999

The 1998 Heat Wave was a professional wrestling pay-per-view (PPV) event produced by Extreme Championship Wrestling (ECW). It was the fifth Heat Wave and took place on August 2, 1998, from the Hara Arena in Dayton, Ohio. This was the first edition of Heat Wave to be broadcast on pay-per-view. The event also featured talent from Frontier Martial-Arts Wrestling (FMW) due to partnership between ECW and FMW.

Six professional wrestling matches were contested at the event. The main event was a Street Fight in which Tommy Dreamer, The Sandman and Spike Dudley defeated The Dudleys (Buh Buh Ray Dudley, D-Von Dudley and Big Dick Dudley). On the undercard, Taz successfully defended the FTW Heavyweight Championship against Bam Bam Bigelow in a Falls Count Anywhere match and Masato Tanaka defeated Mike Awesome. The event also featured FMW's Ace Hayabusa's first and only major wrestling appearance in the United States as he teamed with Jinsei Shinzaki to take on Rob Van Dam and Sabu for the World Tag Team Championship.

== Storylines ==
The event featured wrestlers from pre-existing scripted feuds and storylines. Wrestlers portrayed villains, heroes, or less distinguishable characters in the scripted events that built tension and culminated in a wrestling match or series of matches played out on ECW's television program Hardcore TV.

At Wrestlepalooza, Tommy Dreamer and The Sandman defeated Dudley Boyz (Buh Buh Ray Dudley and D-Von Dudley) in a tag team match. On the May 13 episode of Hardcore TV, Dudley Boyz threatened to give violence to Sandman and Dreamer. At It Ain't Seinfeld, The Dudleys (Buh Buh Ray, D-Von and Big Dick) defeated the team of Tommy Dreamer, The Sandman and Spike Dudley in a six-man tag team match. A rematch took place between the two teams on the June 3 episode of Hardcore TV, which ended in a no contest due to outside interference by New Jack and Jack Victory. During the match, Dudley Boyz executed a 3D on Beulah McGillicutty, which infuriated Dreamer and he wanted revenge on Dudleys. The following week on Hardcore TV, Joel Gertner demanded that Dudleys apologize to Beulah for hitting her with a 3D and trying to break her neck and then Dudleys opened an ambulance and insulted McGillicutty by apologizing her in a mock. On the June 17 episode of Hardcore TV, Jack Victory and Dudleys defeated Tommy Dreamer, New Jack, The Sandman and Spike Dudley in a Philadelphia Street Fight. On the June 24 episode of Hardcore TV, Dreamer cut a promo in which he demanded revenge on Dudleys and he was then assaulted by Dudley Boyz until New Jack, Spike Dudley and The Hardcore Chair Swingin' Freaks (Balls Mahoney and Axl Rotten) made the save. Dudley Boyz continued to insult Beulah McGillicutty on the following week's Hardcore TV, where Dreamer and Sandman brought out FMW's former owner Atsushi Onita as their mystery partner for a match against Dudleys, who eventually turned on Dreamer and Sandman and then New Jack and Spike Dudley made the save for Dreamer and Sandman but Dudleys ended up winning the match, with assistance by Jeff Jones, who made the fast count. On the July 22 episode of Hardcore TV, Buh Buh Ray defeated Dreamer, Sandman defeated D-Von and Big Dick defeated Spike in singles matches, allowing Dudleys to win the singles match series with 2-1 and they were allowed to pick up the stipulation for their scheduled match against Dreamer, Sandman and Spike at Heat Wave. At the end of the show, Dreamer cut an emotional promo on Beulah McGillicutty. Dudleys picked the stipulation to be a Street Fight.

At Hostile City Showdown, The Triple Threat (Shane Douglas, Chris Candido and Lance Storm) competed against Bam Bam Bigelow and Taz in a handicap match, which ended in a no contest when Bigelow turned on Taz while Candido turned on his World Tag Team Championship partner Storm and then Douglas reformed Triple Threat with Bigelow and Candido. This led to Taz becoming a rival of Triple Threat. At Living Dangerously, Bam Bam Bigelow defeated Taz to win the World Television Championship. Taz continued his feud with Triple Threat primarily Shane Douglas and repeatedly demanded a title shot at Douglas' World Heavyweight Championship but Douglas suffered an injury and Taz was unable to get the title shot. At Wrestlepalooza, Taz attacked Douglas but was arrested and escorted away by the police. At It Ain't Seinfeld, Taz introduced his new FTW World Heavyweight Championship due to his frustration of not getting a title shot against Douglas and then challenged Douglas to a title vs. title match but was interrupted by Bigelow and Taz proclaimed that Bigelow would be his first victim. The following week on Hardcore TV, Douglas was being interviewed by Joey Styles until Taz interrupted him and revealed a Triple Threat T-shirt and offered to be a member of Triple Threat and protect Douglas if Douglas gave him a title shot for the World Heavyweight Championship. He then shook Douglas' hand but then attacked his arm to further injure it. Taz got involved in several brawls with Bigelow over the next few weeks, leading to Douglas announcing on the July 8 episode of Hardcore TV that Bigelow and Taz would compete in a match at Heat Wave. On the July 22 episode of Hardcore TV, Taz issued an open challenge to any wrestler with Bigelow accepting the challenge and both men brawled with each other until Lance Storm and Chris Candido made the rescue for Bigelow.

Chris Candido's betrayal of Lance Storm at Hostile City Showdown evolved into a rivalry between the two partners. Storm defeated Candido in a match at CyberSlam and the feud continued between the two. At Living Dangerously, Storm and his chosen partner Al Snow defeated Candido and Shane Douglas in a tag team match. Despite the ongoing feud with each other, Candido and Storm remained World Tag Team Champions but were at odds with each other. On the July 1 episode of Hardcore TV, Candido and Storm lost the World Tag Team Championship to Rob Van Dam and Sabu. The following week on Hardcore TV, there were signs of dissension between the two when Storm blamed Candido for the title loss while confronting Taz during a promo. On the July 15 episode of Hardcore TV, Storm sat at ringside and let Candido on his own for a tag team match against Blue World Order (Nova and The Blue Meanie) and helped Candido in winning the match after letting Candido wrestle the entire match against bWo by himself. Candido and Storm received a rematch for the World Tag Team Championship on July 22 Hardcore TV, during which Storm turned on Candido by walking out on him. On the July 29 episode of Hardcore TV, Candido's leader Shane Douglas cut a promo and held Storm responsible for Sabu injuring Candido's ear and vowed that Candido would avenge the injury from Storm, leading to a match between the two at Heat Wave.

Masato Tanaka from ECW's Japanese partner Frontier Martial-Arts Wrestling competed in his first ECW match at Living Dangerously, defeating Doug Furnas. He then made his full-time debut for ECW on the July 1 episode of Hardcore TV by defeating Balls Mahoney. The following week, on Hardcore TV, Mike Awesome returned to ECW, having wrestled last for the company in a losing effort against Louie Spicolli at Crossing the Line Again in 1997. In his return match, Awesome lost to Tanaka and then decided to execute an Awesome Bomb on him through a table, thus beginning a rivalry between the two and a match was set between the two at Heat Wave. On July 29 episode of Hardcore TV, Tanaka teamed with Jerry Lynn to defeat the team of Awesome and Justin Credible in a tag team match.

At It Ain't Seinfeld, Jerry Lynn defeated Justin Credible in a match to begin a feud between the two. At A Matter of Respect, Credible defeated Lynn in a two out of three falls match. The feud continued as Lynn defeated Credible in an "I Quit" match on the June 17 episode of Hardcore TV. On the July 15 episode of Hardcore TV, Credible and Jason defeated Lynn and Pablo Marquez in an elimination tag team match. The feud led to a match between the two at Heat Wave, with their final encounter taking place on the July 29 Hardcore TV, where Lynn and Masato Tanaka defeated Credible and Mike Awesome.

== Event ==
=== Pre-show ===
Before the event aired live on pay-per-view, The Hardcore Chair Swingin' Freaks (Balls Mahoney and Axl Rotten) defeated The F.B.I. (Little Guido and Tracey Smothers).

=== Preliminary matches ===
In the opening match, Justin Credible took on Jerry Lynn. Lynn started the match with a sunset flip and a crossbody for near-falls. Credible attempted to execute an early That’s Incredible on Lynn but Lynn countered with a hurricanrana to toss him out of the ring and then delivered a diving splash. Credible hit a powerbomb onto a steel chair to get a near-fall. Credible then tossed Lynn out of the ring where his bodyguards Jason and Nicole Bass attacked Lynn, allowing Credible to gain advantage. Lynn made a comeback with a double underhook powerbomb and a hurricanrana from the top rope. Lynn then delivered a tornado DDT on a steel chair and covered Credible for the pinfall but Chastity put Credible's foot on the rope. Lynn then delivered a hurricanrana to Credible from the top rope through a table outside the ring. Lynn returned to the ring where Jason hit him with a steel chair but Lynn countered with a double underhook powerbomb and then Bass attacked him but he countered with a low blow. Lynn delivered a kneeling reverse piledriver to an interfering Chastity and then attempted a hurricanrana to Credible from the top rope but Credible countered with a low blow and delivered a That's Incredible from the second rope to win the match.

Next, Lance Storm took on Chris Candido and Tammy Lynn Sytch returned to ECW to be in Candido's corner. Candido sported a headgear to cover his surgically repaired ear and Storm removed it in the earlier portion of the match. Candido applied a Surfboard on Storm until Storm dropkicked out of the hold. Sytch tripped Storm, allowing Candido to gain advantage over Storm. Storm hit a superkick to make a comeback but Candido countered with a neckbreaker. Storm then suplexed Candido to the outside and then dived onto Candido out of the ring through the ropes. Storm followed with a Superplex and followed with a flying spinning heel kick. Storm dived through into the ring from the apron and Candido countered by powerslamming Storm. Sytch interfered by crutching Storm into the ropes, allowing Candido to execute a Blonde Bombshell for the victory.

A match was scheduled to take place between New Jack and Jack Victory at the event but was cancelled due to a brawl between the two in the parking lot.

Later, Masato Tanaka and Mike Awesome competed in a match. Awesome dominated the match by performing a diving back elbow drop and then caught a flying Tanaka with a belly-to-belly suplex and followed with a diving shoulder block. The action then spilled to the outside where both men brawled at the ringside area until returning to the ring where Awesome delivered an Awesome Bomb to Tanaka followed by an Awesome Splash to get near-falls. Awesome hit Tanaka with a chair three times but Tanaka still managed to get up. Awesome executed a running Awesome Bomb and set a table outside the ring and dived onto Tanaka from the top rope with a steel chair and then attempted to drive Tanaka through the table with an Awesome Bomb but Tanaka countered and delivered a Powerbomb to Awesome through the table. Tanaka delivered a Roaring Elbow to Awesome and followed with a tornado DDT onto two steel chairs to win the match.

Rob Van Dam and Sabu defended the World Tag Team Championship against the Japanese team of Hayabusa and Jinsei Shinzaki from FMW. Both teams exchanged momentum during the early portion of the match. Hayabusa and Sabu used acrobatic moves against each other as Sabu dropkicked him in the knee and executed an Arabian Press. Sabu then applied a camel clutch on Hayabusa and then RVD dropkicked Hayabusa and then Shinzaki delivered a springboard dropkick to RVD. Hayabusa knocked Sabu outside the ring with a baseball slide and followed with a springboard moonsault. The action then spilled to the audience. Hayabusa and Shinzaki gained the momentum against RVD and Sabu and Hayabusa ultimately hit a Firebird Splash on RVD. RVD and Sabu made a comeback with a tandem Rolling Thunder. Sabu applied a Boston crab on Shinzaki and RVD delivered a diving leg drop to get a near-fall. A table was set up in the ring and then RVD delivered Van Daminators to Hayabusa and Shinzaki. RVD and Sabu set the challengers on the table and delivered diving leg drops to both men to retain the titles.

The penultimate match was a Falls Count Anywhere match for Taz's FTW Heavyweight Championship. Bigelow dominated Taz with a powerbomb and then Taz rose up and began a wild brawl with Bigelow which spilled to the crowd. The two returned to the ring where Bigelow hit another powerbomb and then set a table in the ring and drove Taz through the table. He set up the broken table in the corner and attempted to drive Taz into it again but Taz countered by driving Bigelow through the table with a T-Bone Tazplex. They began brawling in the aisle where Bigelow attempted a T-Bone suplex into the crowd but Taz countered that into a tornado DDT. Bigelow walked towards the ring but Taz applied a Tazmission on Bigelow from behind to make him tap out and retain the FTW Championship.

=== Main event match ===
In the main event of the show, Tommy Dreamer, The Sandman and Spike Dudley took on The Dudleys (Buh Buh Ray Dudley, D-Von Dudley and Big Dick Dudley) in a Street Fight. Sandman began bleeding by smashing a beer can on his head before the match even began. Both teams exchanged moves until Buh Buh attempted a Bubba Bomb on Spike which he countered into a hurricanrana and then Sandman hit Buh Buh with a beer can. Both teams then used weapons against each other and brawled throughout the match. Near the end of the match, Big Dick put Dreamer on a ladder and Spike attempted an Acid Drop on Big Dick but Big Dick countered by tossing him through a table outside the ring. Sandman knocked Big Dick by hitting him with a Singapore cane in the head and then attempted to knock out Buh Buh with the cane too but he avoided it and hit him with a chair. Buh Buh tried a diving splash on Dreamer onto the ladder but Dreamer moved out of the way and then delivered a Dreamer DDT to Buh Buh through the table for the win.

== Reception ==
Heat Wave received mixed reviews from critics. Kevin Pantoja of 411Mania rated a score of 8 to the event and called it "the best ECW Pay-Per-View of all time", with "Despite the fact that the last two matches are the worst, they're both entertaining and fun brawls. The undercard featured good wrestling and good brawling. I recommend this as a fun way to spend nearly three hours."

Scott Keith of Inside Pulse stated "I liked it “live” (on the big screen) for the most part. I got into it a lot, but the half half really, really ruined my enjoyment because I kept waiting for the big spots instead of enjoying the show. I dislike being manipulated like that, especially when I can watch it later in a more objective (and less alcohol influenced) frame of mind and be as disappointed as I was. Thumbs up on the ECW sliding scale that you have to apply given their horrible efforts since Barely Legal, thumbs down if you compare it to a real PPV."

David of Wrestling Recaps wrote "This show is called ECW’s best more often than any other pay-per-view or pre-PPV-era supercard, but I disagree. It's a fun ride all the way through, everyone on the card was a good worker at the time (except Big Dick Dudley), and there isn't one throwaway match, but it doesn't have any real standout matches. Lynn/Credible is awesome but doesn't quite hold the show on its back. I think it gets a good wrap for RVD/Sabu/Shinzaki/Hayabusa and Tanaka/Awesome, which were both a lot of fun, but not quite the caliber you might expect from these six names. Also, in terms of ECW storylines at the time, there weren't many surprises. Everyone knew that Taz and Tommy Dreamer were going to get revenge in their respective feuds and everyone knew that RVD and Sabu wouldn’t job to a pair of imports brought in for one night. Thumbs up, one of the best ECW pay-per-views, but just not THE best."

In 2013, WWE released a list of their "15 best pay-per-views ever", with the 1998 Heat Wave ranked at number 14.

The event was named as the Best Major Wrestling Show of 1998 by the Wrestling Observer Newsletter.

== Aftermath ==
Lance Storm continued his rivalry with Chris Candido at Heat Wave as the two squared off in a rematch on the August 12 episode of Hardcore TV, where Storm defeated Candido after fooling him to believe that Tammy Lynn Sytch was bound under a WWF contract and could not be allowed to be at ECW. However, after the match, Joey Styles revealed that Sytch was freed from her WWF contract. Two weeks later, on Hardcore TV, Sytch appeared along with Candido to tell everyone that she would stay in ECW until Storm interrupted them and Candido cleared him from the ring. On the September 5 episode of Hardcore TV, Storm introduced his new valet Tammy Lynn Bytch as an insult to Sytch and then Candido managed to defeat Storm when Sytch pinned him after Sytch ripped off Bytch's clothes. At UltraClash, Candido and Sytch defeated Storm and Bytch in a tag team match to end the feud.

The Triple Threat moved on to a feud with Rob Van Dam and Sabu after the event as Taz defended his unrecognized FTW Heavyweight Championship against Sabu and Bam Bam Bigelow in a triple threat match on the August 12 episode of Hardcore TV with Taz retaining the title due to the match ending in a thirty-minute time limit draw. RVD and Sabu ultimately formed an alliance with Taz called New Triple Threat, which feuded with Triple Threat as Shane Douglas recovered from his injury and made a comeback to in-ring competition. After intensely feuding for the next three months, New Triple Threat defeated Triple Threat at November to Remember to end the feud.

== Results ==
No.	Results	Stipulations	Times
1^{D}	The Hardcore Chair Swingin' Freaks (Balls Mahoney and Axl Rotten) defeated The F.B.I. (Little Guido and Tracey Smothers)	Tag team match	—
2	Justin Credible (with Jason, Nicole Bass and Chastity) defeated Jerry Lynn	Singles match	14:36
3	Chris Candido (with Tammy Lynn Sytch) defeated Lance Storm	Singles match	11:00
4	Masato Tanaka defeated Mike Awesome	Singles match	11:49
5	Rob Van Dam and Sabu (c) (with Bill Alfonso) defeated Hayabusa and Jinsei Shinzaki	Tag team match for the ECW World Tag Team Championship	20:51
6	Taz (c) defeated Bam Bam Bigelow by submission	Falls Count Anywhere match for the FTW Heavyweight Championship	13:21
7	Tommy Dreamer, The Sandman and Spike Dudley defeated The Dudleys (Buh Buh Ray, D-Von and Big Dick) (with Joel Gertner, Sign Guy Dudley and Jeff Jones)	Street Fight	14:26
(c) / – the champion(s) heading into the match; D / – this was a dark match
