= November to Remember (1998) =

1998 Extreme Championship Wrestling pay-per-view event

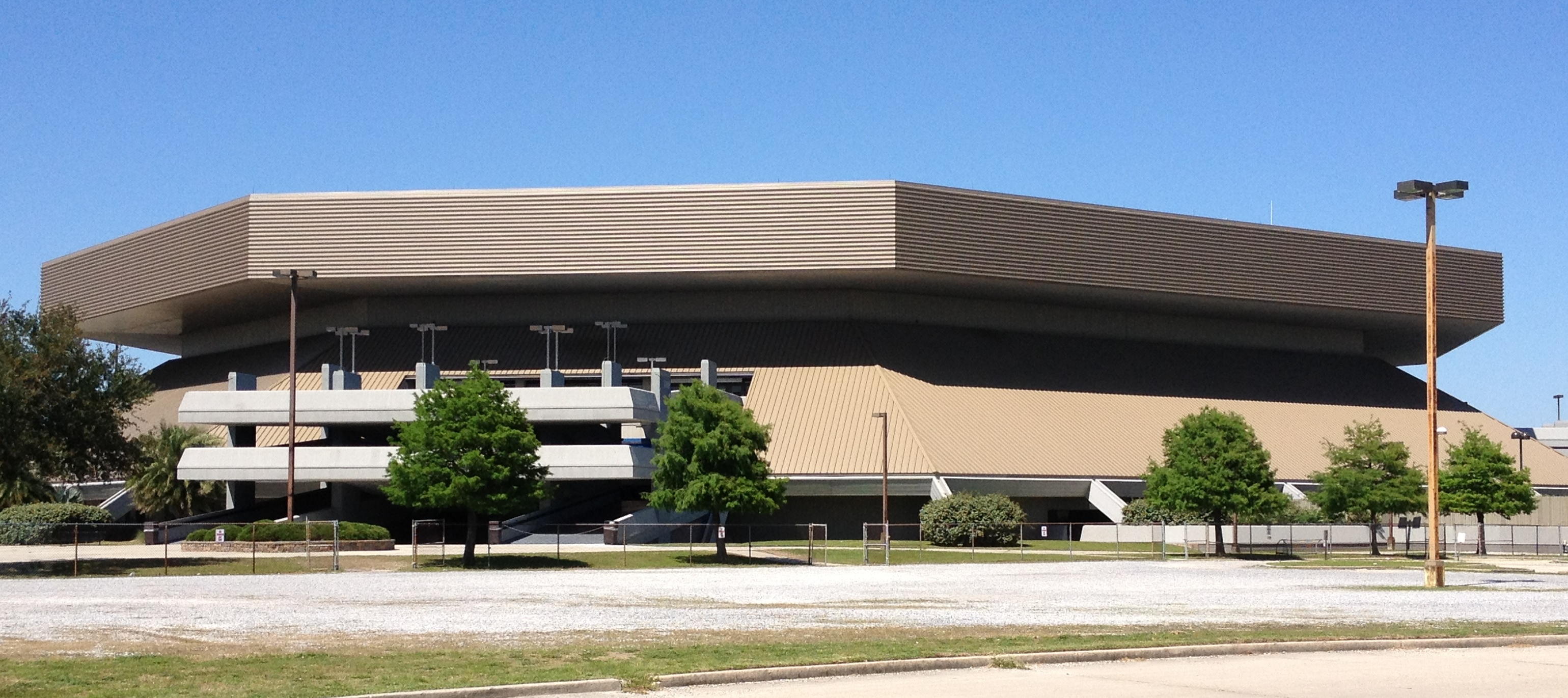
- Promotion: Extreme Championship Wrestling
- Date: November 1, 1998
- City: New Orleans, Louisiana
- Venue: Lakefront Arena
- Attendance: 5,800
- Buy rate: 85,000

Pay-per-view chronology
← Previous; Heat Wave	Next → ECW/FMW Supershow

November to Remember chronology
← Previous; 1997	Next → 1999

November to Remember (1998) was the sixth November to Remember professional wrestling pay-per-view (PPV) event produced by Extreme Championship Wrestling (ECW). The event took place on November 1, 1998 from the Lakefront Arena in New Orleans, Louisiana.

Seven professional wrestling matches were held at the event. The main event was a six-man tag team match, in which the team of Sabu, Rob Van Dam and Taz defeated Triple Threat (Shane Douglas, Bam Bam Bigelow and Chris Candido).

== Storylines ==
The event featured wrestlers from pre-existing scripted feuds and storylines. Wrestlers portrayed villains, heroes, or less distinguishable characters in the scripted events that built tension and culminated in a wrestling match or series of matches.

At Heat Wave, Taz defeated Bam Bam Bigelow in a Falls Count Anywhere match to retain the FTW Heavyweight Championship. On the August 12 episode of Hardcore TV, Taz retained the title against Sabu and Bigelow in a triple threat match after the match ended in a thirty-minute time limit draw. The following week, on Hardcore TV, Bigelow's Triple Threat leader, the injured World Heavyweight Champion Shane Douglas proclaimed that he was a better champion than the World Television Champion Rob Van Dam and announced that Triple Threat would be pursuing Rob Van Dam and Sabu's World Tag Team Championship. Later that night, Bigelow and Chris Candido attacked RVD and Sabu during RVD's match against Dudley Boyz until Taz made the rescue. RVD and Sabu retained their World Tag Team Championship against Triple Threat and Dudley Boyz on August 26 Hardcore TV. It was teased that a new Triple Threat would be formed between RVD, Sabu and Taz against the Triple Threat. On the October 2 Hardcore TV, RVD and Sabu's manager Bill Alfonso tried to convince Taz to form the New Triple Threat with RVD and Sabu but Taz teased a handshake and then left the ring. Later in the main event, Taz made the save for RVD and Sabu from an assault by Triple Threat and Dudley Boyz and formed New Triple Threat. The two teams continued to brawl and battle with each other. On the October 23 episode of Hardcore TV, it was announced that the Triple Threat would face Sabu, RVD and Tazz at November to Remember. A week later, Triple Threat cost RVD and Sabu, the World Tag Team Championship against Dudley Boyz.

On the August 19 episode of Hardcore TV, Justin Credible defeated The Sandman to get a huge upset victory. The two men feuded with each other over the next few weeks as they attacked each other during matches. On the September 19 episode of Hardcore TV, Jack Victory allied himself with Credible and Jason as the trio attacked Sandman during his match against Rod Price later in the night until Tommy Dreamer made the save. One Man Gang made his ECW debut and assaulted both Sandman and Dreamer, thus marking Sandman's exit from ECW who would jump ship to World Championship Wrestling (WCW). On the September 26 Hardcore TV, Dreamer paid tribute to Sandman until he was insulted and attacked by Credible and his allies as Credible heavily made him bleed by assaulting him with Sandman's signature Singapore cane. On the following week's Hardcore TV, Dreamer and The Gangstanators (New Jack and John Kronus) defeated Credible, Victory and Price in a Street Fight. A week later, Dreamer rescued Hardcore Chair Swingin' Freaks (Balls Mahoney and Axl Rotten) from Credible's assaults by hitting Credible with the Singapore cane. On the October 16 Hardcore TV, the team of Dreamer, Spike Dudley and The Gangstanators defeated Credible, Victory, Price and One Man Gang. On the October 30 episode of Hardcore TV, Credible caned Victory's opponent Tommy Rogers to help Victory in defeating Rogers and then Credible's alliance attacked Rogers until Dreamer made the save. Later that night, Jack declared that he would be Dreamer's partner against Credible and his chosen tag team partner at November to Remember as his match against Victory had been cancelled at Heat Wave. Victory then smashed a guitar over Jack's head.

On the October 9 episode of Hardcore TV, Masato Tanaka defeated Buh Buh Ray Dudley in a match after Rob Van Dam and Sabu prevented Bam Bam Bigelow from interfering in the match. On the October 23 episode of Hardcore TV, Tanaka took on Balls Mahoney in a match which ended in a no contest after Dudley Boyz interfered in the match and attacked both men, resulting in a tag team match between the two teams which Mahoney and Tanaka won. This would lead to a match between the two teams at November to Remember, which became a title match after Dudley Boyz won the World Tag Team Championship on October 30 Hardcore TV.

At Heat Wave, Chris Candido defeated Lance Storm in a match. Both men continued to feud with each other after Heat Wave. On the October 16 episode of Hardcore TV, Storm interfered in Candido's match against Jerry Lynn, with Mikey Whipwreck also getting involved into the match. Storm helped Candido in beating Lynn, thus setting up a match between Lynn and Storm at November to Remember.

== Event ==
=== Preliminary matches ===
As the event kicked off, New Jack jumped Jack Victory from behind while Victory was being interviewed. Terry Funk expressed his anger at Tommy Dreamer for not inviting him to the show and choosing him as his mystery partner as Dreamer had done in the past and Dreamer explained that Funk wanted a lighter schedule, so he did not want him to get involved but Funk walked off in anger. The Blue World Order (The Blue Meanie and Super Nova) took on the team of Danny Doring and Amish Roadkill in the first match of the event. Funk came back to the ringside and got himself involved into the match by slapping Meanie, who shoved Funk into the timekeeper's table. BWO hit a Blue Light Special to Doring for the win. After the match, Funk attacked BWO.

In the next match, The Full Blooded Italians member Tracy Smothers took on Tommy Rogers. Smothers' FBI teammates interfered in the match, allowing Smothers to gain advantage. FBI were distracted when they were about to collide as Little Guido had grabbed the Italian flag. The distraction allowed Rogers to hit a Tomikaze to Smothers to win the match. After the match, FBI attacked Rogers until Chris Chetti made the save but he was attacked as well. Ulf Herman then brought out Mabel as a guest member of FBI, who attacked Chetti. Spike Dudley made the save for Chetti but got beaten up. Mabel then attempted to drive him through a table but Dudley moved out of it and Mabel crashed through it and then Dudley executed an Acid Drop to Mabel and covered him with the referee counting the pinfall and awarding the win to Dudley.

Next, Jerry Lynn took on Lance Storm with Tammy Lynn Sytch as the special guest referee while Mikey Whipwreck was the guest enforcer for the match. Sytch was favouring Lynn. Tammy Lynn Bytch tried to interfere and Sytch stripped her off and then Whipwreck nailed a Whippersnapper to Bytch and attempted to execute a Whippersnapper to Sytch as well but Lynn came in her way and was hit with the move. Storm took advantage by covering Lynn for the pinfall but Sytch counted a slow pinfall count. Storm confronted her and she nailed him with a Whippersnapper and Whipwreck nailed her with a Whippersnapper and then Lynn tried to pin Storm with a small package but Whipwreck turned Storm on top of Lynn and gave a fast count to award the win to Storm.

Later, The Dudley Boyz (Buh Buh Ray and D-Von) defended the World Tag Team Championship against Masato Tanaka and Balls Mahoney. Dudleys attacked the challengers from behind to gain advantage. Dudleys executed a 3D to Tanaka who kicked out of the pinfall attempt. Mahoney and Tanaka nailed them with chairs and then executed Nutcracker Suite and Tornado DDT respectively on the chairs to gain near-falls. Dudleys low blowed their opponents and drove Mahoney with a Piledriver and Tanaka with a sitout powerbomb. Dudleys set up tables in the ring but Rob Van Dam and Sabu attacked Dudleys and drove them with a Five-Star Frog Splash and a diving leg drop combination through the tables, allowing Tanaka and Mahoney to win the titles.

The penultimate match of the event featured Tommy Dreamer and his mystery tag team partner Jake Roberts against Justin Credible and Jack Victory. Credible's allies Rod Price, Jason and One Man Gang interfered in the match, prompting The Gangstanators (New Jack and John Kronus) to make the save and brawl with Credible's allies. Dreamer brought a ladder into the ring and placed it into the ring and Roberts executed a DDT to Credible on the ladder for the victory. After the match, Terry Funk confronted Dreamer for picking Roberts over him as his tag team partner and attacked him.

=== Main event match ===
In the main event of the show, The Triple Threat (Shane Douglas, Bam Bam Bigelow and Chris Candido) took on New Triple Threat (Sabu, Rob Van Dam and Taz). Dudley Boyz attacked RVD and Sabu during their entrance to the ring before the match. Taz made the save by hitting a series of Tazplexes on Dudleys. After a back and forth match between the two teams, Taz applied a Tazmission on Douglas and both men laid down on the mat and then Sabu nailed an Arabian Facebuster to both men and pinned Douglas to win the match.

== Reception ==
The event has received generally negative reviews from critics.

In 2011, David of Wrestling Recaps gave the event "thumbs down," stating, "What’s with all the tag team stuff on this card? Only two one-on-one matches? I never cease to be confused by ECW booking. If you can ignore Sunny's handiwork, Lance Storm vs. Jerry Lynn is very good, but there’s not much else of note from this pay-per-view. Thumbs down."

In 2018, Kevin Pantoja of 411Mania gave the event a rating of 4.5 [Poor], stating, "A disappointment of a show. Heatwave was incredible, then we get this. It felt like it wasn’t a special show, mostly due to there being so many tag team matches. The disappointment came from several issues. For one, the main event didn’t deliver. Then, things like the mystery partners and the over focus on shenanigans in an otherwise strong Lynn/Storm match didn’t help. I didn’t see the point of Rogers/Smothers, but was pleasantly surprised by the Tag Title match."

In 2022, Paul Matthews of Classic Wrestling Review described the event as "forgettable," stating, "Heat Wave was great, but this show was forgettable and uneventful. I get they’re holding off on the Taz/Douglas match, but nothing felt important on this show. It wasn’t terrible. None of the bouts were actively bad. But it’s a PPV you forget about at the end of the day. How ironic!"

== Aftermath ==
On the November 13 episode of Hardcore TV, Taz confronted Sabu for stealing the win from him at November to Remember and then Shane Douglas came and provoked Taz into attacking and injuring Sabu and offered him a spot in Triple Threat in place of the departed Bam Bam Bigelow, who left ECW for WCW. Taz pretended to be Douglas' ally until he laid down in a match and put Sabu on top of him for the FTW Heavyweight Championship on the December 25 episode of Hardcore TV. At Guilty as Charged, Taz finally defeated Douglas to win the World Heavyweight Championship.

Justin Credible and Tommy Dreamer continued their feud after November to Remember as Credible defeated Dreamer in a Stairway to Hell match at Guilty as Charged after Terry Funk nailed Dreamer with a trashcan.

On the December 13 episode of Hardcore TV, Dudley Boyz defeated Masato Tanaka and Balls Mahoney in a rematch to regain the World Tag Team Championship.

== Results ==
No.	Results	Stipulations	Times
1	The bWo (The Blue Meanie and Super Nova) defeated Danny Doring and Amish Roadkill	Tag team match	10:54
2	Tommy Rogers (with Chris Chetti) defeated Tracy Smothers (with Tommy Rich, Little Guido and Ulf Herman)	Singles match	7:51
3	Spike Dudley defeated Mabel	Singles match	0:05
4	Lance Storm (with Tammy Lynn Bytch) defeated Jerry Lynn	Singles match with Mikey Whipwreck and Tammy Lynn Sytch as special guest referees	16:48
5	Masato Tanaka and Balls Mahoney (with Axl Rotten) defeated The Dudley Boyz (Buh Buh Ray and D-Von) (c) (with Joel Gertner, Big Dick Dudley and Sign Guy Dudley)	Tag team match for the ECW World Tag Team Championship	15:01
6	Tommy Dreamer and Jake Roberts defeated Justin Credible and Jack Victory	Tag team match	12:26
7	New Triple Threat (Sabu, Rob Van Dam and Taz) (with Bill Alfonso) defeated The Triple Threat (Shane Douglas, Bam Bam Bigelow and Chris Candido) (with Francine)	Six-man tag team match	12:57
(c) / – the champion(s) heading into the match

== See also ==
- 1998 in professional wrestling
