= Wrestlepalooza (1998) =

1998 Extreme Championship Wrestling pay-per-view event

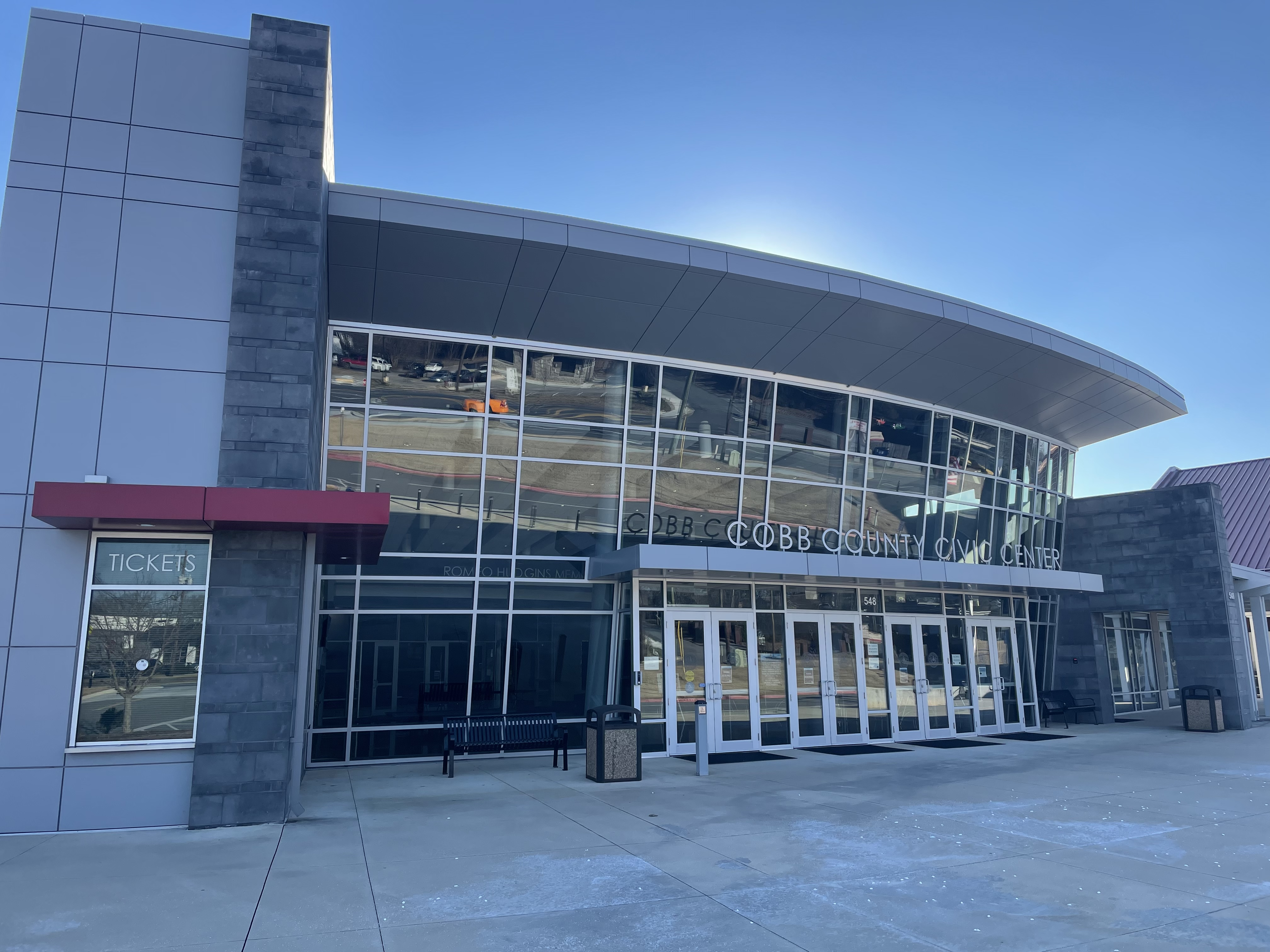
- The Cobb County Civic Center
- Promotion: Extreme Championship Wrestling
- Date: May 3, 1998
- City: Marietta, Georgia
- Venue: Cobb County Civic Center
- Attendance: 3,407 (2,900 paid)
- Buy rate: 85,000

Pay-per-view chronology
← Previous; Living Dangerously	Next → Heat Wave

Wrestlepalooza chronology
← Previous; 1997	Next → 2000

Wrestlepalooza (1998) was the third Wrestlepalooza professional wrestling event produced by Extreme Championship Wrestling (ECW) and the only edition of Wrestlepalooza to be broadcast on pay-per-view (PPV). The event took place on May 3, 1998 in the Cobb County Civic Center in Marietta, Georgia. Joey Styles provided commentary for the event. The PPV was billed as ECW "invading enemy territory", since the state of Georgia was the home of World Championship Wrestling (WCW) in nearby Atlanta.

Seven professional wrestling matches were contested at the event. In the main event, Shane Douglas defeated Al Snow to retain the World Heavyweight Championship in Snow's farewell match in ECW as he departed the company after the event to jump to World Wrestling Federation (WWF). On the undercard, Rob Van Dam successfully defended the World Television Championship against Sabu in a match that ended in a thirty-minute time limit draw and Chris Candido and Lance Storm successfully defended the World Tag Team Championship against The Hardcore Chair Swingin' Freaks (Balls Mahoney and Axl Rotten).

== Storylines ==
The event featured wrestlers from pre-existing scripted feuds and storylines. Wrestlers portrayed villains, heroes, or less distinguishable characters in the scripted events that built tension and culminated in a wrestling match or series of matches played out on ECW's television program Hardcore TV.

At Living Dangerously, Al Snow and Lance Storm defeated Shane Douglas and Chris Candido when Snow pinned Douglas. As a result of pinning Douglas, Snow was named the number one contender for Douglas' World Heavyweight Championship on the March 11 episode of Hardcore TV.

At Living Dangerously, Bam Bam Bigelow defeated Taz to win the World Television Championship. On the March 25 episode of Hardcore TV, Sabu was named the number one contender to Bigelow's title at Wrestlepalooza. Later that night, Sabu cost his tag team partner Rob Van Dam, a match against Al Snow, which resulted in Sabu and RVD nearly coming to blows. RVD planned to soften up Bigelow for Sabu but ended up defeating Bigelow for the title on the April 8 Hardcore TV. Following RVD's title win, Paul Heyman announced that Sabu would receive his title shot against new champion RVD at Wrestlepalooza. The following week on Hardcore TV, RVD won a match by competing in a drag as Sabu to mock him but Sabu did not take it lightly. A week later, RVD threw in the towel for Sabu during Sabu's match against Al Snow, thus costing Sabu the match despite Sabu having the match in control. The two men subsequently brawled with each other.

Mikey Whipwreck ended Justin Credible's undefeated streak in ECW at November to Remember and Credible retaliated by injuring his leg. At Living Dangerously, Whipwreck returned to ECW from injury and cost Credible, a match against Tommy Dreamer. Whipwreck cost Credible a rematch against Dreamer on the March 18 episode of Hardcore TV, resulting in Credible attacking Dreamer and Whipwreck after the match. On the April 8 Hardcore TV, Credible defeated Whipwreck in a match. This led to a match between the two at Wrestlepalooza.

On the April 15 episode of Hardcore TV, The Bushwhackers debuted in ECW as the newest members of The Dudleys, leading to The Sandman and Tommy Dreamer coming to the ring with weapons to assault them. Sandman and Dreamer were set up for an attack by The Dudley Boyz. Dudleys attacked Sandman and Dreamer with chairs and kendo sticks and Sandman was carried away on a stretcher. This would lead to a match between the two teams at Wrestlepalooza.

On the April 29 episode of Hardcore TV, a match was made between New Jack and Bam Bam Bigelow at Wrestlepalooza.

== Event ==
=== Preliminary matches ===
In the opening match of the event, The bWo (The Blue Meanie and Super Nova) took on The F.B.I. (Little Guido and Tracy Smothers). Meanie attempted to execute a Meaniesault on Guido but Tommy Rich distracted him, allowing Guido to avoid the Meaniesault and then Guido hit him with the Italian flag, allowing Nova to hit a Novacaine on Guido for the win.

Next, Mikey Whipwreck took on Justin Credible. Whipwreck finished off the interfering Jason with a Whippersnapper and then Chastity interfered but Whipwreck hit her too with a Whippersnapper from the top rope. Credible got a chair and attempted to hit Whipwreck with it but Whipwreck pulled him to hit a kneeling reverse piledriver but Credible reversed it by hitting a That's Incredible on the chair to win the match.

Next, the unlikely tag team partners Chris Candido and Lance Storm defended the World Tag Team Championship against The Hardcore Chair Swingin' Freaks (Balls Mahoney and Axl Rotten). Mahoney nearly won the match when he executed a Nutcracker Suite to Candido but then grabbed a chair instead of pinning Candido, allowing Storm to hit a springboard dropkick to the chair into Mahoney's face and covered him for the pinfall but Candido broke it and covered Mahoney to retain the titles.

After the match, a tribute was paid to many Southern wrestling stars including Junkyard Dog, Bob Armstrong, Dick Slater, and the Masked Superstar, who appeared at the event. JYD's appearance at Wrestlepalooza would be his final appearance on national television before his death in a car accident a month later.

Later, New Jack competed against Bam Bam Bigelow. Jack smashed a guitar on Bigelow's head to make him bleed but Bigelow still managed to hit a Greetings From Asbury Park to win the match.

Next, Tommy Dreamer and The Sandman took on The Dudley Boyz (Buh Buh Ray Dudley and D-Von Dudley). Sandman was taken out earlier in the match when Buh Buh whipped Sandman onto a guardrail, which injured his neck and Sandman was carried away on a stretcher, leaving Dreamer to fend the Dudleys alone. Dudleys double teamed Dreamer until Spike Dudley came to substitute for Sandman and then the match continued with multiple interferences by Big Dick Dudley and Beulah McGillicutty. Sandman ultimately came back wearing a neck brace and hit his opponents with Singapore cane and then Dreamer and Sandman hit DDTs to Dudleys for the win.

In the penultimate match, Rob Van Dam defended the World Television Championship against Sabu. After a back and forth action between the two, the match ended in a thirty minute time limit draw. As a result, RVD retained the title.

=== Main event match ===
Shane Douglas defended the World Heavyweight Championship against Al Snow despite being severely injured. The Triple Threat constantly interfered in the match and both men kicked out of each other's finishers. Snow attempted a sunset flip from the top rope on Douglas but Douglas rolled through the sunset flip to retain the title.

== Reception ==
Wrestlepalooza received mixed reviews from critics.

In 2002, Scott Keith of 411Mania gave a "strong recommendation to avoid," stating that it was "the consensus favorite for “Worst ECW PPV Ever,” due to some truly uninspired booking and style clashes" and considered the Snow match "a slap in the face to the fans."

In 2011, David of Wrestling Recaps wrote "unless 30 minutes of RVD/Sabu sounds too good to pass up, or unless you are a devout fan of Mikey Whipwreck or Justin Credible, you might be less than enthused about this show."

In 2012, Rock Star Gary of Scott's Blog of Doom stated that the event "was mediocre at best" and considered it to be a "one match (TV title) show." He commented on the main event, "while Al Snow can run with the big boys, his biggest move came against Douglas’ henchmen instead of the champion. I understand how limited Douglas was in this match but it could have been better." He commented on the other matches of the undercard, stating, "RVD-Sabu match-up was incredible with so many high spots. If you have not seen that match please locate it. Without a sufficient ending one would think these guys would have future match-ups" and stated that in the tag team match between Tommy Dreamer, The Sandman, and The Dudley Boyz, despite having "an unpredictable finish, the meat in the middle lacked some flavor."

== Aftermath ==
Shane Douglas' injury kept him sidelined for the next few months after Wrestlepalooza. He continued to appear on ECW television in a non-wrestling role while recovering from his injury and kept the World Heavyweight Championship. He would ultimately return to in-ring competition in the fall of 1998. Al Snow left ECW after Wrestlepalooza and jumped to World Wrestling Federation.

The feud between Tommy Dreamer, The Sandman, Spike Dudley, and The Dudley Boyz continued after Wrestlepalooza, which became intense and personal after The Dudley Boyz injured Beulah McGillicutty on the June 3 Hardcore TV. After feuding for the next two months, the two teams competed in a Street Fight at Heat Wave to end the feud.

== Results ==
No.	Results	Stipulations	Times
1	The bWo (The Blue Meanie and Super Nova) defeated The F.B.I. (Little Guido and Tracy Smothers) (with Tommy Rich)	Tag team match	09:28
2	Justin Credible (with Jason and Chastity) defeated Mikey Whipwreck	Singles match	09:53
3	Chris Candido and Lance Storm (c) (with Tammy Lynn Sytch) defeated The Hardcore Chair Swingin' Freaks (Balls Mahoney and Axl Rotten)	Tag team match for the ECW World Tag Team Championship	12:04
4	Bam Bam Bigelow defeated New Jack	Singles match	08:27
5	Tommy Dreamer and The Sandman (with Beulah McGillicutty) defeated The Dudley Boyz (Buh Buh Ray and D-Von) (with Joel Gertner, Big Dick Dudley and Sign Guy Dudley)	Tag team match	11:19
6	Rob Van Dam (c) vs. Sabu ended in a time-limit draw	Singles match for the ECW World Television Championship	30:00
7	Shane Douglas (c) (with Francine) defeated Al Snow	Singles match for the ECW World Heavyweight Championship	13:05
(c) / – the champion(s) heading into the match
