= Dangerous Danny Davis =

American professional wrestler and referee (born 1956)

Personal information
- Born: Daniel Davis; March 28, 1956 (age 70) Massachusetts, U.S.

Professional wrestling career
- Ring name(s): Danny Davis; Mr. X
- Billed height: 5 ft 10 in (1.78 m)
- Billed weight: 230 lb (100 kg)
- Billed from: Dover, New Hampshire
- Trained by: Phil Watson
- Debut: 1981
- Retired: 1995

Daniel Davis, nicknamed "Avis" (born March 28, 1956) is an American former professional wrestling referee and professional wrestler, best known under the ring name "Dangerous" Danny Davis when he worked for the World Wrestling Federation (WWF). For years, he competed as Mr. X, a masked wrestler while also working as a referee.

As a referee, Davis played the role of a crooked referee who showed blatant favoritism toward certain wrestlers, with the storyline that this eventually led to his removal as a referee. He then helped manage the Hart Foundation and began wrestling as "Dangerous" Danny Davis. He competed at several major WWF events, during which his team won a six-man tag team match at WrestleMania III and advanced to the semi-final round at King of the Ring 1987. He was later reinstated as a referee and remained with the company until the mid-1990s.

== Professional wrestling career ==
=== Mr. X; referee (1980–1986) ===
Danny Davis debuted in the World Wrestling Federation in 1980. He primarily served as a referee.

Davis also wrestled as the masked Mr. X, working masked so that the fans did not realize it was a referee in the ring. The Mr. X character was a jobber who won very few matches. He wrestled some of the WWF's top stars, including former WWF Champions Pedro Morales and Bruno Sammartino. He also participated in the King of the Ring 1986 tournament. He was given a bye to the second round but lost his match to Billy Jack Haynes. His biggest win as Mr. X came on the October 28, 1986 episode of WWF Prime Time Wrestling when he defeated fellow jobber Rudy Diamond.

=== Crooked referee (1986-1987) ===
Starting in 1986, Davis was involved in a storyline that saw him act biased in some matches and had him involved in several controversial matches in which he was thought to favor the heel (villain) wrestlers. To push the idea that he was a crooked referee Davis would often make fast pinfall counts in the side of heel wrestlers and disqualified face (fan favorite) wrestlers with little or no provocation. WWF commentator Gorilla Monsoon accused Davis of accepting bribes, pointing to Davis' wealth as evidence as a means to make the fans dislike Davis. Davis involved himself in a steel cage match between face Hulk Hogan and heel Paul Orndorff. When both wrestlers escaped the cage at the same time, Davis declared Orndorff the winner, while referee Joey Marella stated that Hogan won. As a result, the match had to be restarted, and Hogan eventually won. By acting as a biased referee many of the fan favorite wrestlers would attack him after the matches, using the attack as a way to give them a measure of revenge on the crooked referee after "unfairly" losing the matches. Davis would also overreact to wrestlers putting their hands on him, disqualifying them as part of the storyline. Davis also feuded with the Killer Bees (a team composed of Jim Brunzell and B. Brian Blair) for a while, due to Davis disqualifying Brunzell and Blair in the matches that he refereed.

=== Hart Foundation; Dangerous Danny Davis (1987–1989) ===
On the January 26, 1987 edition of Superstars (aired February 7, 1987), the Hart Foundation defeated The British Bulldogs to win the WWF Tag Team Championship. Danny Davis was the referee for the match and as part of the storyline, he allowed the Hart Foundation to use illegal double-team maneuvers in the match. As a result of the match, WWF president Jack Tunney stripped Davis of his referee duties. That same night, Davis was approached by manager Jimmy Hart about joining his stable of wrestlers. Davis joined up with Jimmy Hart and the Hart Foundation (Bret Hart and Jim Neidhart) and became known as "Dangerous" Danny Davis. He accompanied the Hart Foundation to the ring for their matches and often became involved by attacking the Hart Foundation's opponents from outside the ring or entering the ring to reverse pinfalls by placing Hart or Neidhart on top of their opponents. At the beginning of his suspension as a referee, Davis was involved in a scripted storyline in which he occasionally came to the ring and insisted that he would referee a match. This led to officials from the state athletic commission removing Davis from ringside.

Davis appeared on Piper's Pit, an interview segment hosted by Roddy Piper to discuss his decisions as a referee. Davis refused to admit to any wrongdoing and was confronted by Marella, who criticized him. The segment ended with Piper attacking Davis. At WrestleMania III, Davis made his in-ring debut when he teamed up with the Hart Foundation to defeat the British Bulldogs (Davey Boy Smith and Dynamite Kid) and Tito Santana (Santana's inclusion was explained that Davis had been the referee when Santana had lost the WWF Intercontinental Championship to "Macho Man" Randy Savage who had used a foreign object to get the win even though the heel gimmick had not actually started at that time). Davis got the pin on Smith after he hit him in the head with Jimmy Hart's megaphone.

Davis' next major appearance was in the King of the Ring 1987 tournament. Davis defeated Tito Santana and Junkyard Dog before being eliminated in the third round by Randy Savage, who went on to win the tournament. During 1987, Davis was booked in several series of matches: against Koko B. Ware, George Steele, and Jake Roberts. The feud with Ware included a match televised on the April 13, 1987 episode of Prime Time Wrestling, which ended in a draw. Ware won most of the matches, but Davis won several matches after using foreign objects to attack Ware.

Davis initiated a feud with Steele when Steele was facing Randy Savage in a lumberjack match, which is a match where the ring is surrounded by other wrestlers. Davis, one of the "lumberjacks" at ringside to ensure that neither competitor could escape, attacked Steele with the timekeeper's bell and helped Savage with the match at Saturday Night's Main Event XI. This feud culminated in a match on the November 28, 1987 episode of Saturday Night's Main Event XIII, in which Steele defeated Davis by disqualification after Davis kicked referee Joey Marella. Davis' feud with Roberts began when Davis showed up unexpectedly on the Snake Pit, Roberts' interview segment, while Roberts was interviewing Mr. T. Davis ran away after Roberts brought out Damien, his pet python. On the September 19, 1987 episode of WWF Superstars of Wrestling, Davis attempted to steal Damien during one of Roberts' matches, but Roberts chased him away again. Davis also had a rivalry with Mr. T, who was booked to enforce the rules during matches and thwarted Davis' attempts to interfere. At the inaugural Survivor Series, Davis participated in the opening contest, joining The Honky Tonk Man, Hercules, Ron Bass and Harley Race, facing Randy Savage, Jake Roberts, Ricky Steamboat, Brutus Beefcake and Jim Duggan. Davis was the third man eliminated on his team, after Roberts executed a DDT on him. Roberts and Davis had a singles match the following month on Prime Time Wrestling. Roberts beat Davis quickly, placed Damien on Davis, and left the ring.

As Davis' feuds were winding down, he entered into a new feud with Sam Houston. Houston defeated Davis in their first encounter, but Davis was upset because his foot was on the ropes and the referee should not have counted the pinfall. This disagreement led to a series of angry promotional interviews and fights, as well as a series of matches that lasted several months and saw the two trade victories. The following year, he competed in the battle royal main event at Royal Rumble 1988. He was in the ring for the fourth-longest time but was eliminated by eventual winner Jim Duggan when Davis was thrown over the top ring rope to the floor. He also competed in the 20-man battle royal at WrestleMania IV. He was thrown over the top rope by Paul Roma to be eliminated from the match. Davis' last PPV match was at the Survivor Series once again teaming with Honky Tonk Man, Ron Bass and this time with Bad News Brown and Greg Valentine against Beefcake, Ultimate Warrior, Jim Brunzell, Sam Houston and Blue Blazer. Davis was quickly eliminated by Beefcake in a sleeper hold less than two minutes into the match.

=== Referee (1989–1995) ===
By early spring 1989, Davis ended his alliance with Jimmy Hart and became a jobber to the stars, but by fall of 1989, he requested to be reinstated as a referee promising not to favor the heels or cheating, President Jack Tunney accepted his request and Davis was reinstated as a referee. Following his return to refereeing, his highest profile appearance was after a match at WrestleMania IX where Hulk Hogan used a foreign object to attack his opponents in a tag team contest. Davis came to the ring from backstage and disqualified Hogan overturning the victory for Hulk Hogan. He worked for the WWF until October 1995.

=== Late career (2002–2010) ===
Following eleven years of inactivity as a wrestler, Danny Davis made a return to the ring for Jersey All Pro Wrestling on October 26, 2001. On the "JAPW Class of 2001" event, he was defeated by Mafia (Dan Maff). Davis then joined the World Wrestling Alliance in November 2002. On January 10, 2003, at a WWA card in Norwood, MA Davis defeated Fred Curry Jr. to win the WWA Heavyweight Championship. After successfully defending the title against Curry, Josh Daniels, and Kurt Adonis, Davis finally lost the title to Aaron Stevens on May 23, 2003. Danny Davis would continue to appear in the promotion for the remainder of the decade and won their championship on two other occasions. Following the cessation of World Wrestling Stars (the final name for the WWA), Davis wrestled a handful of times for other promotions. His final match came on September 28, 2013, at the NECW Throwback Throwdown event held by New England Championship Wrestling. There, Danny Davis wrestled Johnny Idol to a time-limit draw.

=== Legacy ===
Although Davis was not the first person to portray the crooked wrestling referee character, he is often mentioned as a prototype of a corrupt official, which is a storyline that has been used by several wrestling promotions. One year after Davis was banned from referee duties, the twin Hebner brothers (Dave and Earl) were involved in a controversy when Earl took Dave's place and showed favoritism to André the Giant, helping him to win the WWF Championship. WCW would later use Nick Patrick as a heel referee, who sided with the NWO faction and eventually joined the NWO himself. TNA would use the gimmick with Earl Hebner, who would show favoritism towards Madison Rayne, with whom he was having an implied relationship. WCCW would use the gimmick with Harold Harris, who would show favoritism towards Devastation Inc. during their feud with Eric Embry. In a similar manner, Eric Bischoff and Vince McMahon, the heads of World Championship Wrestling and World Wrestling Entertainment, respectively, have used the gimmick of evil owners in storylines.

Davis's time as a wrestler and referee led to him appearing in the 1989 line of Classic WWF trading cards. Davis has continued to wrestle occasionally and currently wrestles on the Massachusetts independent wrestling scene. He competed for the World Wrestling Alliance, where he was the WWA Champion. He also occasionally performs as a referee for wrestling matches in Massachusetts. At WWE's WrestleMania XXX event, Davis made his first appearance in the company since 1995, appearing in a backstage segment with WWE legends Sgt. Slaughter, "Hacksaw" Jim Duggan, Ricky "The Dragon" Steamboat, "Million Dollar Man" Ted DiBiase, and Ron Simmons. Davis was wearing a referee shirt in the cameo.

== Championships and accomplishments ==
- New England Pro Wrestling Hall of Fame
  - Class of 2010
- World Wrestling Alliance
  - WWA Heavyweight Championship (2 times)
  - WWA United States Championship (1 time)
- Wrestling Observer Newsletter
  - Worst Feud of the Year (1987) vs. George Steele

== Published works ==
- Davis, Danny; Casanova, Kenny (March 22, 2018). Mr. X – The Life Story of Dangerous Danny Davis. Walking on Hot Waffles Publishing (WOHW). ISBN 9781941356067.
