= WWA Heavyweight Championship (Massachusetts) =

Professional wrestling championship

Details
- Promotion: World Wrestling Alliance
- Date established: June 16, 2000
- Date retired: November 13, 2010
Statistics
- First champion(s): Timothy McNeany
- Final champion(s): Anthony Sparta (won June 13, 2009)
- Most reigns: Timothy McNeany (3)
- Longest reign: Anthony Sparta (518 days)
- Shortest reign: Aaron Stevens (1 day); Damien HS Darling (1 day)

The WWA Heavyweight Championship was a professional wrestling heavyweight championship in the World Wrestling Alliance (WWA). It remained active until November 13, 2010, when the WWA held its final show.

The inaugural champion was "The Graduate" Timothy McNeany, who defeated Mike Steele and Kevin Kelley in a three-way ladder match on June 16, 2000, to become the first WWA Heavyweight Champion. McNeany holds the record for most reigns, with three. At 518 days, Anthony "Prime Time" Sparta's first and only reign is the longest in the title's history. Both Aaron Stevens and Damien HS Darling have the shortest reigns in the history of the title each lasting only one day. Overall, there have been 14 reigns shared between 10 wrestlers, with three vacancies, and 1 deactivation.

== Title history ==
Key

#	Order in reign history
Reign	The reign number for the specific set of wrestlers listed
Event	The event in which the title was won
—	Used for vacated reigns so as not to count it as an official reign
N/A	The information is not available or is unknown
+	Indicates the current reign is changing daily

=== Names ===
Name	Years
WWA Heavyweight Championship	2000 — 2009
WWS Heavyweight Championship	2009 — 2010
WWA Heavyweight Championship	2010

=== Reigns ===
#	Wrestlers	Reign	Date	Days held	Location	Event	Notes	Ref.
1	Timothy McNeany	1	June 16, 2000	127	Whitman, Massachusetts	Live event	McNeany defeated Mike Steele and Kevin Kelley in a three-way ladder match to become the first WWA Heavyweight Champion.	
2	Big Dick Dudley	1	October 21, 2000	132	Brockton, Massachusetts	Live event		
3	Timothy McNeany	2	March 2, 2001	1	Quincy, Massachusetts	Live event		
4	Big Dick Dudley	2	March 3, 2001	62	Rockland, Maine	Live event		
—	Vacated	—	May 4, 2001	—	N/A	N/A		
5	Timothy McNeany	3	November 23, 2001	204	Leominster, Massachusetts	Live event	McNeaney defeated "Diamond" Dave Donovan to win the vacant title.	
6	Fred Curry, Jr.	1	June 15, 2002	209	Quincy, Massachusetts	Live event		
7	Danny Davis	1	January 10, 2003	133	Norwood, Massachusetts	Live event		
8	Aaron Stevens	1	May 23, 2003	1	Canton, Massachusetts	Live event		
9	Jonah	1	May 24, 2003	63	Natick, Massachusetts	Live event	Fellow Tough Enough 3 participant Nick counted the pinfall when referee Sal Giliberto was knocked out.	
10	Al Snow	1	July 26, 2003	N/A	Worcester, Massachusetts	Live event		
—	Vacated	—	2003	—	N/A	N/A		
11	Josh Daniels	1	February 2, 2007	N/A	Quincy, Massachusetts	Live event	Daniels defeated Nick Berk in a ladder match to win the vacant title.	
12	Danny Davis	2	June 2007	N/A	N/A	Live event		
—	Vacated	—	June 2009	—	N/A	N/A		
13	Damien HS Darling	1	June 12, 2009	1	Bridgewater, Massachusetts	Live event	Darling defeated Danny Davis and Spike Dudley in a Triple Threat match to win the vacant title.	
14	Anthony Sparta	1	June 13, 2009	518	Rockland, Massachusetts	Live event	On September 25, 2009, the title was renamed the WWS Heavyweight Championship when the promotion changed its name to World Wrestling Stars.	
—	Deactivated	—	November 13, 2010	—	Taunton, Massachusetts	Live event	WWA closed on November 13, 2010, and Sparta was the final champion in WWA as a company.	

== List of combined reigns ==
<1	Indicates that the reign lasted less than one day.

Rank (Note: Each reign is ranked highest to lowest; reigns with the same number mean that they are tied for that certain rank.)	Wrestler	# of reigns	Combined days
1	Danny Davis	2	775+
2	Anthony Sparta	1	518
3	Timothy McNeany	3	332
4	Jimmy Cicero	2	310
5	Fred Curry, Jr.	1	209
6	Big Dick Dudley	2	194
7	Josh Daniels	1	128+
8	Jonah	1	63
9	Aaron Stevens	1	1
10	Damien HS Darling	1	1
