= Stanley Radwan =

Polish professional wrestler

Personal information
- Born: Stanisław J. Radwan; May 15, 1908 Kraków, Poland
- Died: April 6, 1998 (aged 89) Cleveland, Ohio, U.S.

Professional wrestling career
- Ring name: Stanley Radwan
- Billed height: 5 ft 11 in (1.80 m)
- Billed weight: 210 lb (95 kg)
- Trained by: Henry Gehring
- Debut: 1940s
- Retired: 1950s

Stanisław J. Radwan (May 15, 1908 – April 6, 1998), also known as The Polish Strongman and King of Iron and Steel, was an ethnic Polish, American strongman and professional wrestler in Cleveland, Ohio during the 1940s and 1950s.

== Early life ==
Radwan was born in the Austro-Hungarian Empire in 1908. This was Poland suppressed under this time as Poland was carved into 3 pieces one of which was Austria albeit Polish people like Radwan still spoke Polish and there was a continuance of Polish culture though there was suppression- as any power occupying another's land. Radwan's strength was apparent as a youth, showing off for his childhood friends. Prior to World War II, he joined the Polish navy and earned the rank of lieutenant.

== Bergen-Belsen ==
Radwan was captured following the invasion of Poland by Nazi Germany. He was a prisoner of war at the Bergen-Belsen concentration camp. According to a story in the 1983 issue of Ohio Magazine, Radwan said that he attempted to escape from the camp by pushing over a brick wall with his bare hands. He claimed that when word of the feat reached Adolf Hitler, Hitler came to the camp. Radwan said that Hitler ordered him to put on a show for his friends in Berlin, and Radwan said, "You killed my brothers in Poland and you ask me to do this? Nein!" When a guard pushed a revolver in his face, Radwan claimed that he "grabbed the gun between my teeth and squeezed the barrel shut." According to Radwan, Hitler laughed and ordered the guards to give Radwan extra rations.

== Post-World War ==
After the war, Radwan immigrated to Northeastern Ohio in the United States. He traveled as a wrestler and strongman performing feats such as straightening horseshoes, pulling cars with his teeth, bending quarters, and reclining on a bed of nails while volunteers stones on his chest. For twenty years, Radwan was undefeated as a professional wrestler.

Radwan lived in Cleveland, Ohio, where he was a member of several Polish fraternal organizations and clubs. He hosted a Polish language radio show on Sundays and wrote for two Polish language newspapers. He was also a body guard for local politicians, such as former Mayor Ralph Perk. His popularity among Polish-Americans in Cleveland was valuable to local politicians.

A movie about his life titled The Atomic Man was discussed but never made.

== Death ==
Radwan died in 1998 and was survived by two sons, a daughter, and seven grandchildren.
