= World Wrestling Alliance (Massachusetts) =

Defunct American wrestling promotion

- Acronym: WWA
- Founded: 1996
- Defunct: 2010
- Style: American Wrestling
- Headquarters: Rockland, Massachusetts
- Founder(s): Fred and Mike Sparta
- Owner(s): Fred and Mike Sparta (1996-2000); Focal Point Consulting (2000-2010); Mike Sparta (2010)
- Website: Official website

The World Wrestling Alliance (WWA, formerly known as World Wrestling Stars and WWA New England) was a New England–based American independent professional wrestling promotion located in Massachusetts, founded by former WWF referee Fred Sparta and his brother Mike in 1996. Fred retired in the year 2000 and the company was taken over by Focal Point Consulting. In October 2010, Mike Sparta inherited the company due to his longtime "partner" Bob Ambrose's death. The company briefly changed its name to World Wrestling Stars in 2009, and then WWA New England a year later. The promotion has been a part of the New England "indy scene" for over 15 years. It has regularly featured "Attitude Era" stars from World Wrestling Entertainment (WWE) as well as the local talents of the New England wrestling scene.

In April 1998, WWE came to the WWS (then the WWA) looking for a place where the next generation of WWE stars could compete, and the WWS began serving as WWF's official developmental territory. The promotion has also developed many stars that have gone on to the WWE after completing Super Nova & Dr. Tom Prichard's WWS/WWA New England Training Camp. Many future wrestlers for Extreme Championship Wrestling, Total Nonstop Action Wrestling, World Championship Wrestling, World Wrestling Entertainment, and Lucha Libre USA competed in the promotion for years before entering the "major leagues", most notably, Damien Sandow, Kenny Dykstra, John Quinlan, and R. J. Brewer. Quinlan actually had his debut match in the WWA facing Brewer on November 26, 1999. The promotion's last show was held on November 13, 2010, following the death of longtime commissioner Bob Ambrose.

== Alumni ==
=== Singles ===
- "Dangerous" Danny Davis
- Spike Dudley
- Kenny Casanova
- Doink the Clown
- "The Punisher" Don Vega
- Moondog Maximus
- Shockwave the Robot
- Viper the Ninja
- Short Sleeve Sampson
- The Patriot
- One Warrior Nation
- Rick Steiner
- Flash Wheeler
- Vik Dalishus
- "The Shaft" Bobby Ocean
- Tre the Smooth Operatin' Gangsta
- The Kreeper
- "The Final Freebird" And Locker Room Thief Damian H.S. Darling
- Johnny Thunder
- "The Reflex" Eric Dylan
- Little Killa
- Rob "The Giant" Araujo
- Jason Blade
- Bob Holly
- "The Platinum Playboy" J. Busta
- Disco Inferno
- Dynamite Doug Summers
- Josef Von Schmidt
- Bryce Andrews
- "The Epic" Mike Bennett
- "Heart Attack" Tommy Mack
- Aaron Stevens
- Judas Young
- Eugene
- Goldust
- Test
- Josh Daniels
- Texas Outlaw
- Brandon Webb
- Chris Camaro
- Rosey The Superhero
- Manu
- "Primetime" Anthony Sparta
- Christopher Annino aKa Rescue 911
- X-Pac

=== Tag teams ===
- The Untouchables (Anthony Michaels & Mark Gore)
- The Alden Brothers (Shane & Eric)
- The DelFonzo Brothers (Tony "Da Fonz" & Eddie "Bam Bam" DelFonzo)
- The French Connection (Antoine Roy & Rush)

=== Other personalities ===
- Mike Sparta, owner and promoter
- Bob Ambrose, commissioner
- Shawn O., ring announcer
- The Skunk, manager
- Zac Carter, referee
- Nick Joyce, referee
- Keith Angelo, referee and head of security
- The Hecklers (Steve, Tom & Chris), consultants

=== Championships ===
| Title | Wrestler(s) | Date won | Location |
|---|---|---|---|
| WWA Heavyweight Championship | Anthony "Primetime" Sparta | June 13, 2009 | Rockland, Massachusetts |
| WWA United States Championship | Danny Davis | November 13, 2010 | Taunton, Massachusetts |
| WWA Cruiserweight Championship | Shockwave | May 23, 2003 | Canton, Massachusetts |
| WWA Tag Team Championship | The Lady Killers | March 16, 2002 | |

== See also ==
- List of independent wrestling promotions in the United States
