= Chastity (wrestler) =

American professional wrestling valet (born 1971)

Personal information
- Born: Denise Riffle; June 18, 1971 (age 55) Columbia, Maryland

Professional wrestling career
- Ring name(s): Chastity; Madame Chastity; Brittany Bottoms
- Billed height: 5 ft 4 in (163 cm)
- Billed weight: 120 lb (54 kg)
- Trained by: Corporal Punishment; Raven
- Debut: 1996
- Retired: c. 2002

Denise Riffle (born June 18, 1971) is an American former professional wrestling valet. She is best known for her stint in Extreme Championship Wrestling and World Championship Wrestling under the ring name Chastity.

== Professional wrestling career ==
Riffle's wrestling career got started after an ex-boyfriend suggested that she give it a try after attending an independent wrestling show. She always wanted to get into the entertainment field and act or sing, and she loved the challenge. She was introduced to the local promoter/wrestler named Dan McDevitt and began her training. When she debuted as a wrestler/valet, her first ring name was Brittany Bosoms.

In Extreme Championship Wrestling she began managing the stable Blue World Order. Later she managed Raven and his stable, Raven's Nest. When Raven went to World Championship Wrestling (WCW) in the summer of 1997, she began managing Justin Credible. She left ECW in 1998.

After ECW, she joined WCW after Raven asked her to join him. She admitted that leaving ECW was very difficult for her because Paul Heyman gave her a chance but WCW was offering bigger money and a brighter spotlight and decided to leave. When she arrived in WCW, she was booked as the sister of Raven. When that storyline was dropped, Chastity re-emerged as the valet/girlfriend of The Sandman who became known as Hak with whom he developed an on-screen relationship after she turned on Raven. A few weeks later, Turner Standards & Practices became aware of Chastity's participation in a hardcore pornographic movie. She was immediately removed from television with no explanation and her contract was terminated.

After WCW, she worked in the independents, Maryland Championship Wrestling and Xtreme Pro Wrestling.
