= Big Dick Dudley =

American professional wrestler (1968–2002)

- Big Dick Dudley

Personal information
- Born: Alexander Paul Rizzo; January 12, 1968 Paterson, New Jersey, U.S.
- Died: May 16, 2002 (aged 34) Copiague, New York, U.S.
- Cause of death: Kidney and Heart failure
- Spouse: Elektra (divorced)
- Children: 2

Professional wrestling career
- Ring name(s): Alexander The Great; Big Dick Dudley; The Tennessee Fist Machine
- Billed height: 6 ft 6 in (198 cm)
- Billed weight: 320 lb (145 kg)
- Billed from: "The Twisted Steel Section of Dudleyville"
- Trained by: Johnny Rodz; Max Length
- Debut: 1986
- Retired: March 2001

Alexander Paul Rizzo (January 12, 1968 – May 16, 2002) was an American professional wrestler, better known by his ring name, Big Dick Dudley. Rizzo was best known for his appearances with the Philadelphia, Pennsylvania-based professional wrestling promotion Extreme Championship Wrestling from 1994 to 1999 as a member of The Dudley Brothers.

== Professional wrestling career ==
=== Early career (1986–1994) ===
Rizzo began training with Johnny Rodz alongside the likes of Taz, Phil Theis and the Santiago Twins and became one of the first students to graduate from the now infamous school in Brooklyn. He claimed his first professional matches came in late 1986 in Puerto Rico alongside fellow Rodz students and future ECW alumni Rocco Rock and Abdullah the Butcher. He returned to the U.S. after his tour of Puerto Rico and began wrestling on the East Coast independent scene under the name of Alexander the Great.

=== NWA Eastern/Extreme Championship Wrestling (1994–1999) ===
Rizzo joined Eastern Championship Wrestling (ECW) in 1994. He entered just as the federation began to take off, breaking away from its National Wrestling Alliance (NWA) ties and becoming Extreme Championship Wrestling. This allowed Rizzo a chance to shine, and he took it, transforming into Big Dick Dudley, the man from Dudleyville, a creation he said was thought up between himself, Taz and Tommy Dreamer.

With his partner, Dudley Dudley, the "brothers" became a strong group in ECW, with their strong-arm antics. Big Dick became known for his powerhouse finisher, the Total Penetration, a double arm chokeslam into a tigerbomb, as well as his dangerous habit of attacking fans at ringside. Soon, the Dudley Family grew, including Buh Buh Ray, D-Von, Snot, Spike, and Dances with Dudley, creating a very dangerous family. Big Dick, being the eldest as well as the largest, formed the heart of the group, planning out attacks and leading the group. He also had to deal with brotherly problems, including feuds with D-Von and Spike.

Although Big Dick was the leader of the family, he rarely was given title shots, instead content to sit back and direct his brothers in their quests for gold. His aid to Buh Buh Ray and D-Von helped create the great tag team that was The Dudley Boyz, and his giant stature made Spike even more popular in their feud. As some of the Dudley family left, the remaining members, Buh Buh Ray and D-Von, became Tag Team Champions. They soon became top heels in the company. He also carried on an almost year-long feud with Spike, the biggest brother against the smallest, with the fans firmly on the side of the underdog. In 1999, after many disagreements with Paul Heyman over what Rizzo felt was a lack of use of his character he finally left the company. Rizzo went on record after his departure saying that he felt he never got the opportunities he deserved, going as far as saying that he felt that given the chance he could have become the top draw in the company.

=== Later career (1999–2001) ===
After Big Dick left ECW he would spend time in many different organizations over the next couple of years including making his Puerto Rico return for Carlos Colon's WWC becoming a mainstay over the next few years wrestling the likes of a young Carly Colon, Abdullah the Butcher and the infamous Invader I. He had reasonable success in WWC becoming one of the bigger heels in the company but never capturing any titles possibly due to the fact that his tours tended to be reasonably frequent but brief. It was during his time in Puerto Rico that he worked in front of the biggest crowds of his career stating that some of his heel antics caused near riots during events.

In 1999 helped found the semi-popular XPW, known, like ECW, for its hardcore antics. At one point, Big Dick took home the XPW World Heavyweight Championship. He would go on to earn belts in the NWA Jersey faction and the USPW federation. But things soon began to go downhill for the senior member of the Dudleyz. In only two years, Big Dick was involved in four auto accidents, including a serious motorcycle crash that left him with a broken neck. This kept Big Dick on the sidelines of wrestling for over a year.

Big Dick's last match was in March 2001.

== Personal life ==
Rizzo was married to fellow wrestler Donna "Elektra" Adamo, whom he met while training under Johnny Rodz. The couple divorced prior to Rizzo's death in May 2002.

== Death ==
On May 16, 2002, Rizzo was found dead in his apartment. He was 34 years old. The cause of death was kidney failure brought on by years of painkiller abuse. According to former wife Elektra on what happened the day of his death:

The day he did pass on, he woke up, he had stomach pains all week because of a change in prescription on Monday. And he woke up, he had stomach pains all week, he had woke up and tried to go to the bathroom and actually couldn't urinate. So he became a little concerned because he did have the sensation to go. I know it sounds really gross but this is the truth. So he called my sister-in-law and he asked her what to do. Should he go to the hospital because he really felt lousy. She told him to try a glass of cranberry juice, thinking it was likely a urinary tract infection or something to that effect. Then if he still couldn't go and didn't feel good maybe it was a good idea to go to the doctor but it didn't seem like any kind of a big deal. Which that, the woman he was with, I'd assume, I'm not sure if they were married or not, I don't think they were. I think it was a boyfriend/girlfriend type of thing, who was living with him, he sent her out to get some cranberry juice. So she came back and poured him a glass. He went into the living room to sit and drink his juice. He just didn't want to be bothered because he didn't feel very well. He got up to use the lavatory, and that's where he just fell face first and passed away.

== Championships and accomplishments ==
- Northeastern Wrestling
  - NEW Heavyweight Championship (1 time)
- Northern States Wrestling Alliance
  - NSWA Heavyweight Championship (1 time)
- NWA Jersey
  - NWA Jersey Hardcore Championship (1 time)
  - NWA Jersey Heavyweight Championship (1 time)
- Pro Wrestling Illustrated
  - PWI ranked him #200 of the 500 best singles wrestlers of the PWI 500 in 1998
- USA Xtreme Wrestling
  - UXW Heavyweight Championship (2 times)
  - UXW Tag Team Championship (1 time) - with Sam Dudley
- World Wrestling Alliance
  - WWA Heavyweight Championship (2 times)
- Xtreme Pro Wrestling
  - XPW World Heavyweight Championship (1 time)

== See also ==
- Big Dick Dudley Memorial Show
- The Dudley Brothers
- List of premature professional wrestling deaths
