= Raven's Nest =

Professional wrestling disbanded stable

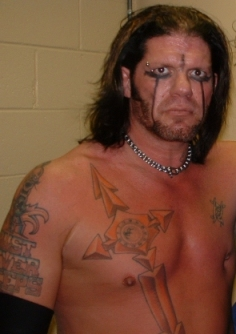
- Raven led the original Raven's Nest faction and its various incarnations

Stable
- Name(s): Raven's Cult; Raven's Nest; The Dead Pool; The Flock; The Gathering; The New Movement; Serotonin; The Calling
- Members: Raven (leader); See other members below
- Debut: January 7, 1995

Raven's Nest was a professional wrestling stable led by Raven that was present in Extreme Championship Wrestling (ECW) between 1995 and 1997.

Later, Raven created other incarnations of the group in World Championship Wrestling (WCW) such as The Flock and The Dead Pool, and in Total Nonstop Action Wrestling (TNA) such as The Gathering and Serotonin. A new incarnation of the group was formed in Major League Wrestling as The Calling.

== History ==
=== Extreme Championship Wrestling ===
==== Early feuds (1995) ====
Raven's Nest was formed in Extreme Championship Wrestling on the January 10, 1995 episode of Hardcore TV when Stevie Richards introduced the former Johnny Polo to ECW as Raven, who proclaimed himself as the leader of Generation X. Raven helped Richards defeat Hack Meyers in a match. Raven immediately began feuding with Tommy Dreamer after his debut and cut promos on weekly television to show his hatred for Dreamer and instilled the hatred into Richards. Richards would then compete against Dreamer in a match at Double Tables, which Richards lost, ending his winning streak. Raven's faction began expanding at Return of the Funker when Richards introduced The Broad Street Bullies (Johnny Hotbody and Tony Stetson) as the newest member of the group and the four brawled with Dreamer. At Extreme Warfare, Raven, Richards and the Bullies defeated Dreamer in a Generation X gauntlet match after Dreamer beat Richards, Stetson and Hotbody but failed to beat Raven after Terry Funk severed Raven's handcuffs.

At Three Way Dance, Richards gave an ultimatum to Bullies to win their match against The Pitbulls (Pitbull #1 and Pitbull #2) or else they would be fired from Raven's Nest. Pitbulls defeated the Bullies, thus ousting them from the group and replacing them in Raven's Nest. The following match was the first singles encounter between Raven and Dreamer, during which Raven introduced Beulah McGillicutty, an overweight girl whom Raven and Dreamer met in a summer camp and Dreamer had abandoned her. She had by then become a Penthouse model and she seconded Raven to the ring. During the match, Richards tried to kiss McGillicutty, who slapped him, leading Dreamer to intervene. It turned out to be a ruse as McGillicutty blinded him with a hair spray and Richards attacked her, allowing Raven to defeat him. The following week, at Hostile City Showdown, Richards took on Mikey Whipwreck, who defeated Richards after Hack Meyers prevented Raven from interfering in the match. Later that night, Raven and Dreamer competed in a rematch, which ended after Dreamer notably delivered a piledriver to McGillicutty. Pitbulls would also compete at the event, challenging Public Enemy (Johnny Grunge and Rocco Rock) for the World Tag Team Championship in a losing effort.

At Enter the Sandman, Whipwreck and Dreamer took on Raven and Richards in a tag team match, which Raven and Richards won by disqualification after Dreamer hit Raven with a clenched fist. Later at the event, Pitbulls received a rematch for the World Tag Team Championship against Public Enemy in a dog collar match but failed to win the titles. As a result of a pre-match stipulation, Public Enemy got five minutes with Richards but Raven saved him and a brawl ensued which culminated with Dreamer making the save. Beulah McGillicutty and Luna Vachon also got involved and Dreamer delivered a piledriver to McGillicutty to close the show. At Barbed Wire, Hoodies & Chokeslams, Vampire Warrior made his ECW debut as Raven's Nest's newest member, who arrived in ECW to fight Dreamer to get Dreamer's hands off his real wife Vachon. Warrior would then lose a match to Dreamer. Later that night, Richards helped McGillicutty defeat Vachon in a match by hitting the latter with a chair. The match was followed by a brutal moment where Raven handcuffed Vachon in a crucifixion position and tried to hit her with a chair but Dreamer stepped in to receive the chair shot. Due to the assault, Dreamer was unable to team with 2 Cold Scorpio and Taz in a six-man tag team match against Pitbulls and Richards, making it a handicap match. Richards would get distracted by flirting with the debuting Francine and McGillicutty at ringside, which prompted Raven to scold Richards and push him back to the locker room. The distraction caused Pitbulls to lose to Scorpio and Taz. This incident would bow the seeds for dissension between Pitbulls and Raven's Nest.

==== ECW World Tag Team Champions (1995) ====
At Mountain Top Madness, Pitbulls defeated local wrestlers Dino Sandoff and Don E. Allen, while Raven and Richards got championship success by defeating Public Enemy to win the ECW World Tag Team Championship. At Hardcore Heaven, Pitbulls took on the debuting Dudley Brothers (Dudley Dudley and Snot Dudley) in the opening match. During the match, Francine kissed Richards, leading to McGillicutty brawling with her. Raven broke up the fight by taking them backstage, distracting Pitbulls and causing them to lose once again in similar fashion. Later at the event, Raven and Richards defended the World Tag Team Championship against Dreamer and Vachon. They retained the titles after Beulah threw powder in Vachon's face. Pitbulls would appear after the match and Raven ordered them to deliver a superbomb to Vachon. Pitbulls refused to oblige, prompting Richards and Raven to humiliate them by shoving apple pie in their face. Pitbulls eventually attacked Raven and Richards, thus leaving Raven's Nest and turning into faces. They tried to nail a superbomb to Richards but Dudley Brothers saved Richards, thus confirming their allegiance to Raven's Nest.

At Heat Wave, Raven and Richards retained the World Tag Team Championship against Don E. Allen and Tony Stetson by getting counted out after leaving the ring to break up a brawl between Francine and Beulah. Later at the event, Raven and Dudley Brothers lost to Dreamer and Pitbulls in a six-man tag team match, and Richards lost a steel cage match to Vachon. A post-match brawl occurred after the steel cage match, in which Dreamer handcuffed Raven to the ring and hit him with a chair, which infamously became known in the wrestling industry as "The Chair Shot Heard Around The World". At Wrestlepalooza, the four-man Raven's Nest consisting of Raven, Richards and Dudley Brothers (Big Dick Dudley and Dudley Dudley) defeated Dreamer, Cactus Jack and Pitbulls in an eight-man tag team match after Jack turned on Dreamer by hitting him with a double arm DDT and put Raven on top of him for the pinfall. As a result of the incident, Jack joined Raven's Nest and began feuding with Dreamer. On August 26, a match took place between Beulah McGillicutty and Francine after months of catfights between the two. Stevie Richards served as the guest referee for the match. Richards turned on Francine by hitting her with a Stevie Kick and McGillicutty pinned her for the win. After the match, Raven and Richards assisted McGillicutty in delivering a spike piledriver to Francine. Following that, Francine joined The Pitbulls in feuding with Raven's Nest.

During this time, Snot Dudley got injured and eventually left ECW, and was replaced by Dances with Dudley as Dudley Dudley's new tag team partner in Dudley Brothers. At Gangstas Paradise, Dudleys defeated Chad Austin and Don E. Allen. Later at the event, Raven and Richards lost the World Tag Team Championship to The Pitbulls in a two out of three falls match after Dreamer and 9-1-1 thwarted interferences by Dudley Brothers and attacked crooked referee Bill Alfonso, leading Commissioner Tod Gordon to count the pinfall. At South Philly Jam, Cactus Jack defeated the debuting El Puerto Riqueño after the latter refused to forfeit the match. Raven and Jack attacked Riqueño after the match but Dreamer made the save only to get double teamed by Raven and Jack, leading to Pitbulls making the save. Later at the event, Raven and Richards defeated Pitbulls to regain the titles. However, at the same event, Raven and Richards lost the titles to Public Enemy in a three-way match, also involving The Gangstas (Mustafa Saed and New Jack). On the October 17 episode of Hardcore TV, Raven's Nest gained a new member when Buh Buh Ray Dudley debuted in ECW as the newest member of Dudley Brothers.

At November to Remember, Buh Buh served as the guest ring announced for a match between Broad Street Bully and Don E. Allen but got frustrated due to his stuttering and attacked both competitors. Buh Buh then went on to defeat the Bully in a match. Later at the event, Richards introduced the debuting The Blue Meanie as his sidekick and defeated Riqueño, while Raven and Jack lost a match to Dreamer and Terry Funk. At December to Dismember, Buh Buh and Dances with Dudley defeated Bad Crew (Dog and Rose) in the opening match. Later at the event, a grudge match took place between Raven and Dreamer, which Raven won after hitting him with a beer bottle. Later in the night, Raven and Richards teamed with The Heavenly Bodies (Jimmy Del Ray and Tom Prichard) and The Eliminators (Kronus and Saturn) to take on Dreamer, Pitbulls and Public Enemy in an Ultimate Jeopardy match, where a stipulation would be applied on the participant who was pinned or submitted. Richards was pinned and was locked in the cage with the five members of the opposing team as a result of a pre-match stipulation. Dreamer attacked Richards but was assaulted by Raven's team as Public Enemy and Pitbulls had been handcuffed to the ring apron during the match. The Sandman eventually made the save by attacking Raven and his allies with a Singapore cane, forcing them to retreat.

At Holiday Hell, Cactus Jack proclaimed himself to be Mikey Whipwreck's tag team partner for the ECW World Tag Team Championship after Whipwreck defeated 2 Cold Scorpio to win the latter's ECW World Television Championship and the World Tag Team Championship. Also at the event, Dreamer and Raven were supposed to compete in a match to determine the #1 contender for the ECW World Heavyweight Championship later in the show but Richards claimed that Raven had a broken leg and was unable to compete. This distracted Dreamer enough for Blue Meanie to attack him and an immediate match took place between the two, which Dreamer quickly won. Richards then attacked Dreamer and Dreamer quickly defeated him as well. Dreamer then attempted to nail a piledriver to Beulah but Raven attacked him, leading to their match, which Raven won after assistance by Richards and Meanie. Later at the event, a confrontation took place within Raven's Nest when Meanie and Richards made fun of Buh Buh's dancing skills and Richards told Buh Buh that Raven would be enraged. This led to Buh Buh defeating Meanie and walking out of Richards, which led to Dudley Brothers quitting Raven's Nest. Also at the event, Raven failed to win the World Heavyweight Championship from The Sandman despite interference by Cactus Jack, and Jack lost to Sabu in the main event.

==== Raven's World Championship reigns (1996–1997) ====
At House Party on January 5, 1996, Raven interfered in Mikey Whipwreck's World Television Championship title defense against 2 Cold Scorpio, costing Whipwreck, the match. Later at the event, a segment occurred where Beulah McGillicutty revealed that she was pregnant but Raven was not the father's child. This enraged Raven, who attacked Stevie Richards but McGillicutty revealed that the father was Tommy Dreamer. Dreamer then made the save for McGillicutty by attacking Raven's Nest and embraced McGillicutty, thus marking her exit from Raven's Nest. On the January 30 episode of Hardcore TV, Raven introduced Kimona Wanalaya as his new valet to replace McGillicutty and defeated The Sandman to win the World Heavyweight Championship after interference by Raven's Nest. At Big Apple Blizzard Blast, Jack and Whipwreck lost the World Tag Team Championship to The Eliminators after a miscommunication occurred between the two as Whipwreck prevented Jack from using a beer bottle. Jack turned on Whipwreck by attacking him after the match. Later at the event, Raven and Richards lost a tag team match to Dreamer and Shane Douglas.

At CyberSlam, the debuting Bruise Brothers (Don Bruise and Ron Bruise) joined Raven's Nest by attacking Dreamer and shoving his testicles repeatedly into the ringpost. Later at the event, Richards teamed with The Eliminators against Francine and The Pitbulls in a dog collar match, which Francine and Pitbulls won after Francine pinned Richards. Also at the event, Jack lost to Douglas after Whipwreck hit Jack with a chair and Raven's Nest helped Raven in retaining the World Heavyweight Championship against Sandman. At Just Another Night, Richards and Meanie lost a match to The Pitbulls while Jack lost to Bam Bam Bigelow and Raven retained the title against Douglas after assistance by Raven's Nest. Douglas then aided Sandman in attacking and chasing away members of Raven's Nest and the two formed an alliance to take the title from Raven. On the first night of Big Ass Extreme Bash, Jack lost a match to Chris Jericho while Raven retained the title against Sandman. On the second night, Jack wrestled his farewell match in ECW, defeating Whipwreck, and then hugged Whipwreck and cut a farewell promo, and then left ECW to join World Wrestling Federation. Later that night, Raven retained the title against Douglas.

At Massacre on Queen's Boulevard, Raven retained the title against Damián 666 while Brian Lee joined Raven's Nest later at the event to feud with Dreamer. Lee subsequently teamed with Bruise Brothers to defeat Dreamer and Pitbulls.

== World Championship Wrestling ==
=== The Flock ===
The Flock was Raven's faction founded in August 1997 soon after his debut in World Championship Wrestling (WCW). All wrestlers in the faction adopted Raven's grunge gimmick, complete with similar ring attire.

Unlike other factions in WCW at the time, the group (though popular) met with limited success and lost most of their matches. The group disbanded after former member Saturn won the rest of the members' freedom from Raven on September 13, 1998, at Fall Brawl. The Flock is best remembered for hanging around in the crowd (usually at ringside) and then pouncing on any given wrestler, usually without provocation. Each member of the Flock was a social outcast for one reason or another and sought acceptance within the Flock:

- Stevie Richards – Raven's lackey from his ECW days, Richards appeared a few times with Raven in WCW before he failed a physical examination, which led to Richards returning to ECW.
- Hammer – A heavy metal star turned wrestler formerly known as Van Hammer who was released from WCW and (kayfabe) had nowhere to go. He joined the Flock as an outcast, looking for work. He defeated Saturn in a "Loser leaves The Flock" match, but was thrown out of the group by Raven, who preferred Saturn on the May 11, 1998 edition of Nitro.
- Horace – Horace was recruited into the group solely because he was the nephew of then WCW World Heavyweight Champion Hollywood Hogan. Raven attempted to use him to get close to Hogan.
- Kanyon – Like many Flock members, Kanyon feuded with Raven before eventually joining him. Kanyon was the last person to join The Flock before it was disbanded. In spite of this, he remained loyal to Raven, and would stay by his side several months afterwards.
- Kidman – Kidman was said to be homeless before meeting Raven. He had something of a heroin addict gimmick, though this was never explicitly said on WCW television; he constantly scratched his body (a sign of heroin use) and exhibited other behavior linked with the drug. Kidman turned on Raven during his match at Fall Brawl, allowing Saturn to win and free The Flock. After his leaving The Flock, he exhibited a more hygienic presence and was no longer seen scratching himself.
- Lodi – Lodi had a psychological need for approval and acceptance, and so became Raven's most loyal lackey. He carried signs to ringside with slogans written on them which promoted the Flock and mocked their opponents, the fans, and sometimes rival promotions.
- Reese – Reese was an outsider in society for his massive size. Feeling that the outside world was only interested in his physical appearance rather than his true personality he sought solace with The Flock, becoming their most intimidating back up weapon.
- Riggs – In a match with Raven, former American Male Scotty Riggs fell victim to a kayfabe eye injury after Raven executed a drop toe-hold that drove Riggs face first into the seat of a steel chair. Forced to wear an eyepatch, Riggs began seeking revenge while Raven tried to recruit Riggs to join him. Raven further injured Riggs by hitting three DDTs while he was unconscious, then instructed The Flock to take possession of Riggs. He emerged from the injury just as despondent as the rest of the members.
- Saturn – Raven's enforcer, he eventually grew tired of Raven and left The Flock, causing the feud between the two which led to the disbanding of the group.
- Sick Boy – A Power Plant hopeful who wrestled as Lance Ringo against Diamond Dallas Page in his first televised match. Despondent after being defeated in his first match, he would disappear for months until he was recruited by Raven to join the Flock in its crusade against Diamond Dallas Page.

=== Necro Ward / Dead Pool / Dark Carnival ===
The Dead Pool (originally called the Necro Ward) was another stable centered on Raven. It was first put together in August 1999 while Raven was in WCW and saw him teaming up with Vampiro and the Insane Clown Posse (ICP) (Violent J and Shaggy 2 Dope). When Raven quit WCW and went back to ECW a month after the group's inception, Vampiro and ICP stayed together under the moniker the Dark Carnival and continued without him.

The group has since resurfaced numerous times, including in ICP's Juggalo Championship Wrestling (JCW) where ICP formed another version of the group, the Dead Pool 2000, with the addition of Balls Mahoney as well as various independent promotions where Raven and ICP team together. Members included:

- Vampiro
- Insane Clown Posse (Violent J and Shaggy 2 Dope)
- The Great Muta (joined after Raven left)
- The Demon (joined after Raven left)

== Total Nonstop Action Wrestling ==
=== The Gathering ===
When Raven joined Total Nonstop Action Wrestling (TNA), he formed a new version of the Flock, this time calling them The Gathering. The original Gathering members were Julio Dinero and Alexis Laree, with CM Punk joining the group soon after its inception. Punk and Dinero played 'adoring Raven fanboy' gimmicks, making Raven the main focus of the group. Alexis left both the group and TNA after being signed to a contract by World Wrestling Entertainment (WWE). On December 17, 2003, Punk and Dinero turned on Raven during a six-man steel cage match. Raven disappeared from TNA, while Punk and Dinero joined up with longtime Raven-enemy James Mitchell and continued to wrestle under the Gathering tag team name.

The team came to an abrupt end when Punk left TNA to remain in Ring of Honor (ROH). Dinero was eventually released. Mitchell disappeared for over a year before returning in July 2005 as the manager of Abyss.

=== Serotonin ===
On the November 16, 2006 episode of Impact!, Kazarian, Maverick Matt, and Johnny Devine appeared with drastically changed appearances, calling themselves The New Movement. Later, through a series of vignettes, they revealed their name to be Serotonin, referencing the brain chemical of the same name that regulates, among other things, aggression, moodiness, and depression – things the Raven character has been linked to since its inception.

Raven's involvement with Serotonin began differently than with other incarnations of The Flock. Instead of speaking for the group during promos and being around at ringside during matches, Raven was only seen after matches, when he would come to the ring to hit the members with a kendo stick, regardless of the result of the match, as part of a program referred to as "torture builds success". The members would drop to their knees and took their licks without complaint, for the most part. The only dissension of being hit was that of Kazarian on occasion, but this was defused by the other members instead of Raven. Serotonin wrestled mostly on dark matches before pay-per-views and lost the majority of them. When wrestling in singles competition, members often took the role of jobbers to more established stars such as Kurt Angle, Sting or Jerry Lynn. Serotonin picked up their first official win at Against All Odds, defeating the team of Sonjay Dutt and Jay Lethal following interference from Maverick Matt. On the March 8, 2007 episode of Impact!, it was announced that Raven had changed their names: renaming Kazarian to Kaz, Maverick Matt to Martyr, and Johnny Devine to Havok. Dissension on the part of Kaz became more apparent during the Lockdown pre-show, in which Kaz refused to allow Christy Hemme to be attacked by Raven after Serotonin's loss to Voodoo Kin Mafia. Serotonin retaliated to this, distracting and therefore costing Kaz in a match against Chris Sabin on the March 31, 2007 episode of Impact!. On the June 21, 2007 episode of Impact!, Kaz turned on Serotonin by costing Raven a match against Chris Harris. On the July 12, 2007 episode of Impact!, Kaz defeated Martyr and Havok in a three-way match to earn a spot in the Ultimate X match at Victory Road. Kaz was subsequently attacked by Raven and the remaining members of Serotonin. Kaz defeated Raven in a match at Hard Justice. Bentley was later released by TNA, leaving only Havok and Raven as Serotonin members. Raven made few appearances in the succeeding months, some of which involved Raven and Havok aligning with Black Reign and James Mitchell, who were attempting to destroy Mitchell's longtime enemy and kayfabe son Abyss. On the November 15 episode of Impact!, Havok was revealed to be Team 3D's X Division traitor and reverting to his Johnny Devine ring name, effectively ending Serotonin.

== Major League Wrestling ==
=== The Calling ===
In the summer of 2022, segments would air showing various members of the MLW roster laid out with a calling card on their body. After several months of attacks backstage, men in gasmasks attacked Lince Dorado, Microman and Mister Saint Laurent after a tag match on the February 28th edition of MLW Underground TV. The following week, it was revealed that the group was led by Raven including Rickey Shane Page and Akira. On March 7, 2023, Raven announced himself in a video to be the group's leader.

At the 2024 Intimidation Games, Raven formed a new stable in MLW called The Response after Rickey Shane Page stole The Calling name from him and then raged a war against The Calling.

== Members ==
=== ECW ===
| Member | Joined | Left |
|---|---|---|
| Beulah McGillicutty | April 8, 1995 | January 5, 1996 |
| Johnny Hotbody | February 25, 1995 | April 8, 1995 |
| Raven | January 7, 1995 | June 6, 1997 |
| Stevie Richards | January 7, 1995 | May 17, 1997 |
| Pitbull #1 | April 8, 1995 | July 1, 1995 |
| Pitbull #2 | April 8, 1995 | July 1, 1995 |
| Tony Stetson | February 25, 1995 | April 8, 1995 |

Other members:

- The Vampire Warrior
- The Dudley Brothers (Big Dick Dudley, Dudley Dudley and Lil' Snot Dudley)
- Cactus Jack – Turned on Tommy Dreamer and joined Raven to help send a message about hardcore wrestling to Dreamer.
- The Heavenly Bodies (Tom Prichard and Jimmy Del Ray)
- The Blue Meanie
- Kimona Wanalaya - Kimona replaced Beulah after Beulah left the Nest in January 1996.
- The Bruise Brothers (Don and Ron Harris)
- Brian Lee
- Super Nova
- Miss Patricia
- Don E. Allen
- Lori Fullington – The Sandman's ex-wife.
- Tyler Fullington – The Sandman's seven-year-old son. Raven brainwashed Tyler into "worshiping" him, and had him turn on Sandman during a match, hitting him with a Singapore cane. While Tyler was physically incapable of helping Raven defeat The Sandman, he was a useful psychological distraction.
- Lupus
- Chastity
- Reggie Bennett

=== WCW ===
The Flock

- Raven
- Stevie Richards
- Hammer
- Horace
- Kanyon
- Kidman
- Lodi
- Reese
- Riggs
- Saturn
- Sick Boy

Necro Ward/Dead Pool/Dark Carnival

- Raven
- Vampiro
- Insane Clown Posse (Violent J and Shaggy 2 Dope)
- The Great Muta (joined after Raven left)
- The Demon (joined after Raven left)

=== TNA ===
The Gathering

- Raven
- CM Punk
- Alexis Laree
- Julio Dinero
- Cassidy Riley

Serotonin

- Raven
- Havok
- Kaz
- Martyr

=== MLW ===
The Calling

- Raven
- Rickey Shane Page
- Akira
- Delirious
- Cannonball
- Talon
- Dr. Cornwalius
- Mandy León
- The Hive (Note: An army of unnamed masked henchmen used in beatdowns and are frequently referred to by the commentators as "The Hive".)
- Sami Callihan

== Sub-groups ==
| Affiliate | Members | Tenure | Type | Promotion(s) |
|---|---|---|---|---|
| Blue World Order | Da Blue Guy / The Blue Meanie; Hollywood Nova; Stevie Richards / Big Stevie Cool | 1996–1997 | Stable | ECW |
| The Bruise Brothers | Don Bruise; Ron Bruise | 1996 | Tag team | ECW |
| The Dudley Brothers | Big Dick Dudley; Buh Buh Ray Dudley; Chubby Dudley; Dances with Dudley; Dudley Dudley; Sign Guy Dudley; Snot Dudley | 1995 | Stable | ECW |
| Insane Clown Posse | Shaggy 2 Dope; Violent J | 1999 | Tag team | WCW |
| The Pitbulls | Pitbull #1; Pitbull #2 | 1995 | Tag team | ECW |

== Championships and accomplishments ==
- Extreme Championship Wrestling
  - ECW World Heavyweight Championship (2 times) – Raven
  - ECW World Tag Team Championship (3 times) – Raven and Stevie Richards (2), Cactus Jack (1 with Mikey Whipwreck)
- Major League Wrestling
  - MLW World Middleweight Championship (1 time) – Akira
  - MLW National Openweight Championship (1 time) – Rickey Shane Page
  - MLW World Tag Team Championship (1 time) – Akira and Rickey Shane Page
- World Championship Wrestling
  - WCW United States Heavyweight Championship (1 time) – Raven
  - WCW World Television Championship (1 time) – Saturn
- WrestleForce
  - WrestleForce Tag Team Championship (1 time) – Lodi and Sick Boy
