= Heatwave '95: Rage in the Cage! =

1995 Extreme Championship Wrestling supercard event

- The ECW Arena
- Promotion: Extreme Championship Wrestling
- Date: July 15, 1995 (aired July 18, 1995)
- City: Philadelphia, Pennsylvania, United States
- Venue: ECW Arena
- Attendance: 1,000
- Tagline: Rage in the Cage!

Event chronology
← Previous; Hardcore Heaven	Next → Wrestlepalooza

Heat Wave chronology
← Previous; 1994	Next → 1996

Heatwave '95: Rage in the Cage! was the second Heatwave professional wrestling event produced by Extreme Championship Wrestling (ECW). The event took place on July 15, 1995 in the ECW Arena in Philadelphia, Pennsylvania in the United States. Excerpts from then event aired on episode #117 of the syndicated television show ECW Hardcore TV on July 18, 1995.

Eight professional wrestling matches were contested at the event. The main event was a steel cage match, in which The Public Enemy (Rocco Rock and Johnny Grunge) squared off against The Gangstas (New Jack and Mustafa). A notable event took place after the steel cage match between Stevie Richards and Luna Vachon, which saw Tommy Dreamer handcuff Raven to the cage and break a folding chair over his head in what was described as "the chair shot heard around the world".

== Storylines ==
The event featured wrestlers from pre-existing scripted feuds and storylines. Wrestlers portrayed villains, heroes, or less distinguishable characters in the scripted events that built tension and culminated in a wrestling match or series of matches played out on ECW's television program Hardcore TV.

The Gangstas (New Jack and Mustafa Saed) debuted in ECW at Barbed Wire, Hoodies & Chokeslams, where they attacked The Public Enemy (Rocco Rock and Johnny Grunge) after their scheduled World Tag Team Championship defense against The Bad Breed (Axl Rotten and Ian Rotten) was cancelled by Bill Alfonso. At Hardcore Heaven, Public Enemy defeated Gangstas in a tag team match. This led to a rematch between the two teams at Heat Wave.

At Hardcore Heaven, Axl Rotten defeated Ian Rotten in a Taipei Deathmatch to end the feud between the two. Later that night, The Sandman successfully defended the World Heavyweight Championship against Cactus Jack. On the July 4 episode of Hardcore TV, it was announced that Sandman would defend the title against Rotten at Heat Wave.

At Barbed Wire, Hoodies and Chokeslams, Raven abandoned The Pitbulls (Pitbull #1 and Pitbull #2) to confront Stevie Richards and Beulah McGillicutty due to McGillicutty's fight against Richards' admirer Francine during a handicap match against Taz and 2 Cold Scorpio, which cost Pitbulls, the match. At Hardcore Heaven, Pitbulls lost again, this time to the debuting Dudley Brothers (Dudley Dudley and Snot Dudley) due to Raven once again abandoning them at ringside due to the issue between Richards, Francine and Beulah. Later that night, Pitbulls showed up after Raven and Richards retained the World Tag Team Championship against Tommy Dreamer and Luna Vachon. Raven ordered Pitbulls to superbomb Luna to which Pitbulls refused and then Raven and Richards humiliated them by shoving apple pie in their faces and hitting them with chair and then Pitbulls retaliated by attacking Raven and Richards, thus quitting Raven's Nest and turning faces and siding with Dreamer against his feud with Raven and Dudley Brothers, leading to Raven and Dudleys taking on Dreamer and Pitbulls at Heat Wave.

At Hardcore Heaven, Taz defeated 2 Cold Scorpio but Bill Alfonso overturned the decision due to Scorpio's foot on the bottom rope and then Scorpio turned heel by hitting Taz in the back with a steel chair and pinning him to win the match with Alfonso counting the pinfall. On the July 11 episode of Hardcore TV, it was announced that Taz would team with Eddie Guerrero to take on Scorpio and Dean Malenko in a tag team match at Heat Wave.

== Event ==
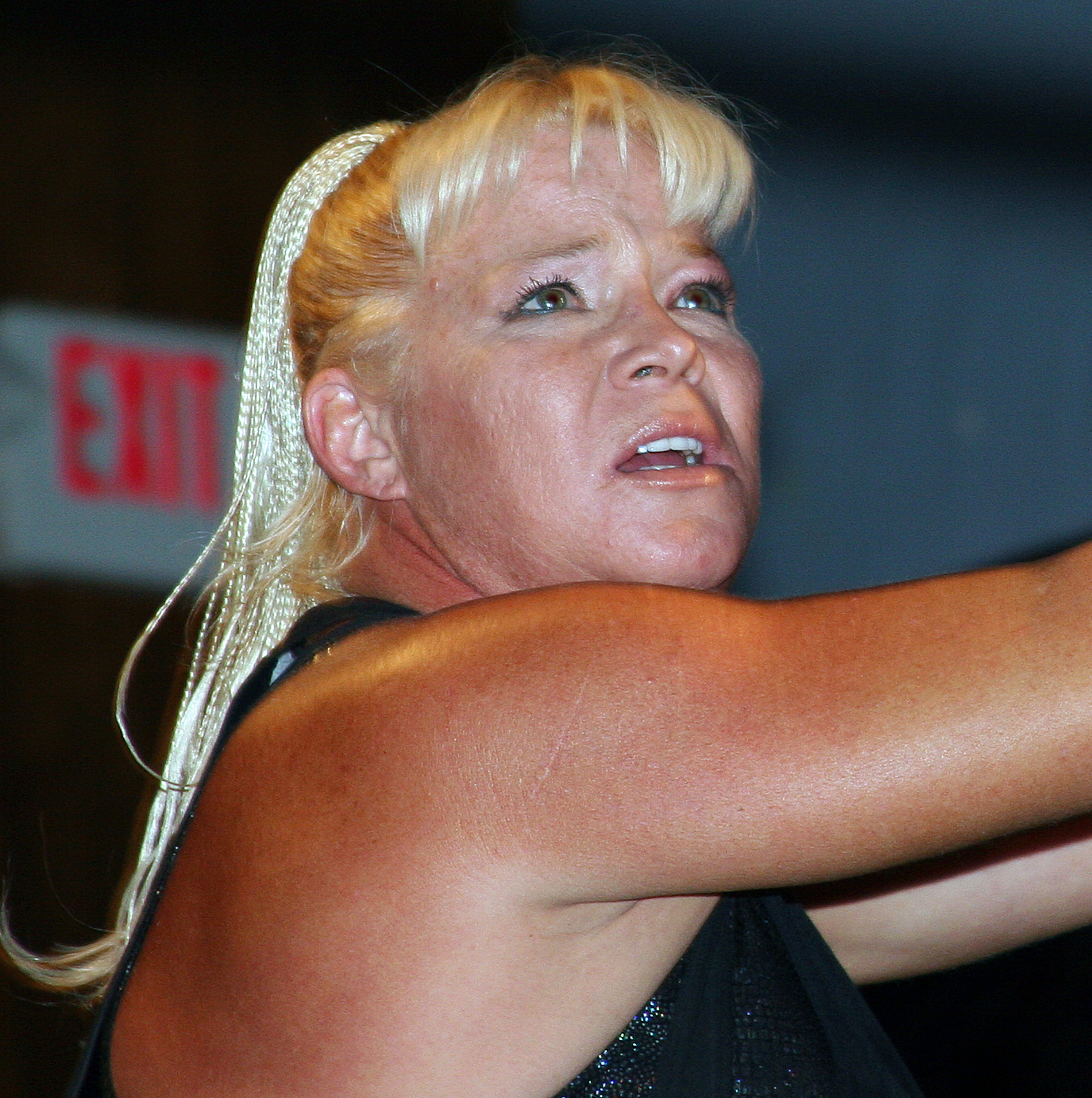
Luna Vachon competed in a steel cage match at Heat Wave.

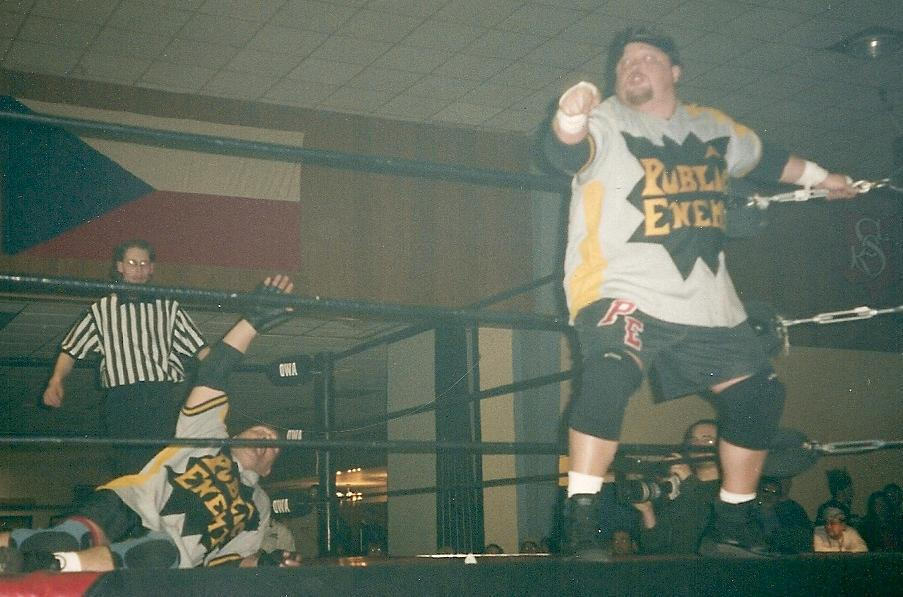
The Public Enemy wrestled in the main event of Heat Wave.

The opening bout was a singles match between Mike Norman and Mikey Whipwreck. Whipwreck won the match by pinfall following a FrankenMikey.

The second bout was a tag team match in which Raven and Stevie Richards defended the ECW World Tag Team Championship against Don E. Allen and Tony Stetson. The match ended when Beulah McGillicutty began fighting with Richards' admirer Francine, which distracted Raven and Richards enough for the two to leave the ring to break it up and getting counted out, thus retaining the title.

The third bout was a singles match between Hack Meyers and Val Puccio. The match ended when Puccio attempted to execute an elbow drop on Meyers, who avoided it and pinned Puccio for the win.

The fourth bout was a six-man tag team match pitting Tommy Dreamer and the Pitbulls against Raven, Dudley Dudley, and Snot Dudley. The match ended when the Pitbulls delivered superbombs to Richards and Snot to get the win.

The fifth bout was a tag team match pitting Eddie Guerrero and Taz against 2 Cold Scorpio and Dean Malenko. The match ended when Paul E. Dangerously hit a cell phone on Scorpio's head while Scorpio had climbed up the top rope, leaving him vulnerable for Taz, who hit a Tazplex on Scorpio for the victory. However, Bill Alfonso overturned the decision and let the match continue due to Dangerously's interference. This distracted Taz enough for Scorpio to superkick him while Malenko gave a sitout powerbomb to Guerrero, then Scorpio and Malenko pinned Taz and Guerrero simultaneously to win the match. After the match, Alfonso and Dangerously confronted each other and Rob Feinstein intervened until 911 came and chokeslammed Feinstein.

The sixth bout saw the Sandman defend the ECW World Heavyweight Championship against Axl Rotten. After a back and forth action, Sandman hit a Bitchin' Leg Drop on Rotten and pinned him to retain the title.

The penultimate match of the event was an intergender steel cage match between Luna Vachon and Stevie Richards. Vachon applied a testicular claw on Richards to make him submit. After the match, Tommy Dreamer handcuffed Raven to the cage and smashed a steel chair on his head, thus breaking it. It had such an impact that it was considered "the chair shot heard around the world."

The main event was a steel cage match in which the Public Enemy (Johnny Grunge and Rocco Rock) took on the Gangstas (Mustafa and New Jack). Rock executed a moonsault from the cage onto Jack onto a stack of tables and then Mustafa sprayed something in Grunge's eyes and pinned him for the win.

== Reception ==
Heat Wave received negative reviews from critics, although many appreciated Tommy Dreamer's chair shot on Raven as the true incident of the show that was worth watching. Matt Peddycord of Wrestling Recaps stated "Clearly the only match worth seeing is the Guerrero/Malenko tag match. If you dig the Dreamer/Raven stuff, the cage match is MUST-SEE VIEWING. The addition of the Pitbulls/Dudleys brawling is really fun too. Slight thumbs in the middle for Heat Wave 1995."

Scott Keith of 411Mania wrote "this was the Raven v. Tommy show, which provided for some entertaining segments, although the wrestling sucked", with "Mild recommendation to avoid unless you’ve never seen the Chairshot Heard Round the World."

== Aftermath ==
The alliance of Tommy Dreamer and The Pitbulls continued their feud with Raven's Nest and Dudley Brothers after Heat Wave as Raven threatened to destroy the Pitbulls due to Pitbulls betraying him. On the July 25 episode of Hardcore TV, Raven's Nest attacked Pitbulls after their match until Luna Vachon and Dreamer made the save. Dreamer and Pitbulls teamed with Cactus Jack to take on Raven, Richards and the Dudley Brothers at Wrestlepalooza.

The Gangstas and Public Enemy continued their feud as the two teams competed in a stretcher match at Wrestlepalooza.

Eddie Guerrero and Taz competed against 2 Cold Scorpio and Dean Malenko in a Heat Wave rematch on the July 25 episode of Hardcore TV, which Guerrero and Taz won. During the match, Taz injured his neck which put him out of action for several months. A week later on Hardcore TV, Guerrero lost the World Television Championship to Malenko.

On the August 1 Hardcore TV, Mikey Whipwreck became the number one contender for the World Heavyweight Championship by winning a battle royal and received a title shot against The Sandman later in the night but failed to win the title. The two began a feud over the title and faced each other in a non-title match at Wrestlepalooza.

== Results ==
No.	Results	Stipulations	Times
1	Mikey Whipwreck defeated Mike Norman by pinfall	Singles match	6:41
2	Tony Stetson and Don E. Allen defeated Raven and Stevie Richards (c) (with Beulah McGillicutty) by countout.	Tag team match for the ECW World Tag Team Championship	2:10
3	Hack Meyers defeated Val Puccio by pinfall	Singles match	6:15
4	The Pitbulls (Pitbull #1 and Pitbull #2) and Tommy Dreamer (with Luna Vachon) defeated Raven and the Dudley Brothers (Dudley Dudley and Snot Dudley) (with Beulah McGillicutty, Big Dick Dudley, and Stevie Richards)	Six-man tag team match	5:33
5	2 Cold Scorpio and Dean Malenko defeated Eddie Guerrero and Taz (with Paul E. Dangerously) by pinfall	Tag team match	20:00
6	The Sandman (c) (with Woman) defeated Axl Rotten by pinfall	Singles match for the ECW World Heavyweight Championship	10:35
7	Luna Vachon defeated Stevie Richards by submission	Steel cage match	7:45
8	The Gangstas (Mustafa and New Jack) defeated the Public Enemy (Johnny Grunge and Rocco Rock) by pinfall	Steel cage match	14:23
(c) / – the champion(s) heading into the match

== See also ==
- 1995 in professional wrestling
