= Hardcore Heaven (1995) =

1995 Extreme Championship Wrestling supercard event

- The ECW Arena.
- Promotion: Extreme Championship Wrestling
- Date: July 1, 1995 (aired July 4 and 11, 1995)
- City: Philadelphia, Pennsylvania, United States
- Venue: ECW Arena
- Attendance: 1,150

Event chronology
← Previous; Mountain Top Madness	Next → Heat Wave

Hardcore Heaven chronology
← Previous; 1994	Next → 1996

Hardcore Heaven (1995) was the second Hardcore Heaven professional wrestling event that took place on July 1, 1995, in the ECW Arena in Philadelphia, Pennsylvania in the United States.

Eight professional wrestling matches were contested at the event. In the main event, The Gangstas made their in-ring ECW debut against The Public Enemy. The event marked the final appearance of Shane Douglas in ECW as he departed the promotion to join World Wrestling Federation and also marked the debut of The Dudley Brothers, a stable that would ultimately evolve into the tag team The Dudley Boyz.

Excerpts from Hardcore Heaven aired on episodes #115 and #116 of the syndicated television show ECW Hardcore TV on July 4 and 11, 1995, while the full event was released on VHS. The bout between Cactus Jack and the Sandman appeared on the 2008 compilation DVD ECW – Extreme Rules, while the Taipei Death Match between Axl Rotten and Ian Rotten appeared on the 2006 compilation DVD Blood Sport – ECW's Most Violent Matches.

== Storylines ==
The event featured wrestlers from pre-existing scripted feuds and storylines. Wrestlers portrayed villains, heroes, or less distinguishable characters in the scripted events that built tension and culminated in a wrestling match or series of matches played out on ECW's television program Hardcore TV.

At Barbed Wire, Hoodies & Chokeslams, The Public Enemy (Rocco Rock and Johnny Grunge) were scheduled to defend the World Tag Team Championship against The Bad Breed (Axl Rotten and Ian Rotten) but Bill Alfonso prevented the match from taking place due to Bad Breed being forced to disband several months ago. The Gangstas (New Jack and Mustafa) then debuted in ECW and attacked Public Enemy. This led to a match between the two teams at Hardcore Heaven.

Axl Rotten and Ian Rotten had been feuding with each other since the two had lost a match to The Pitbulls (#1 and #2) on the January 17 episode of Hardcore TV, which stipulated that the losing team would be forced to break up. Since Axl had been pinned, Ian attacked him with a chair, resulting in a rivalry between the two former tag team partners. They competed in several matches against each other in which they traded wins, leading to a Taipei Deathmatch between Axl and Ian at Hardcore Heaven.

At Hostile City Showdown, The Sandman defeated Shane Douglas to win the World Heavyweight Championship, thus ending Douglas' year-long reign. Cactus Jack was named the number one contender to the title on the April 25 episode of Hardcore TV and Douglas grew jealous of Jack getting the title shot instead of him. Jack received the title shot on the May 9 Hardcore TV, where Douglas' Triple Threat teammates Chris Benoit and Dean Malenko cost him the title shot. Jack and Douglas would then cost each other title shots against Sandman. At Barbed Wire, Hoodies & Chokeslams, Sandman defended the title against Jack in a Barbed Wire match. Jack initially won the title by getting up as Sandman was unable to answer the referee's ten count until Bill Alfonso restarted the match on the ground that a title did not change hands on countouts. Alfonso then screwed Jack by deeming him unable to continue despite Jack not getting unconscious as Sandman was choking him down with barbed wire. This led to Jack getting another title shot against Sandman at Hardcore Heaven.

Tommy Dreamer and Raven had been feuding with each other since Raven's ECW debut in early 1995. At Barbed Wire, Hoodies & Chokeslams, Dreamer defeated Luna Vachon's husband and Raven's Nest member Vampire Warrior, who was obsessed with Luna siding with Dreamer. Later the event, Luna lost to Dreamer's estranged girlfriend Beulah McGillicutty after a chair shot by Stevie Richards. After the match, Luna was attacked by Raven's Nest until Dreamer attempted to make the save but he was beaten as well. The day before Hardcore Heaven, at Mountain Top Madness, Raven and Stevie Richards defeated Public Enemy to win the World Tag Team Championship, leading to them defending the title against Dreamer and Luna at Hardcore Heaven.

== Event ==
=== Preliminary matches ===
As the event kicked off, The Dudley Brothers made their ECW debut as the Dudley members Snot Dudley and Dudley Dudley took on The Pitbulls (Pitbull #1 and Pitbull #2), who were seconded by their Raven's Nest teammates Raven, Stevie Richards and Beulah McGillicutty. During the match, Francine - who had debuted the prior month at Barbed Wire, Hoodies & Chokeslams - kissed Richards until Beulah broke it up and began a catfight with Francine. Raven dragged Richards and Francine to the backstage. Pitbulls nailed a superbomb to Snot but were distracted as Raven had been gone. The distraction allowed Dudley Dudley to dive and hit Pitbull #2 in the back of the head and put Snot on top of him for the pinfall victory.

Next, Chad Austin and The Broad Street Bully took on Dino Sendoff and Don E. Allen. The match ended in a no contest as 911 interrupted the match and chokeslammed everyone in the match.

Next, Hack Meyers took on Big Malley. Malley overpowered Meyers with his strength and size until he missed an elbow drop on Meyers and Meyers pinned him for the win. After the match, Malley attacked Meyers and splashed him many times.

In the following match, Taz took on 2 Cold Scorpio. Taz initially won the match by executing a Taz-plex but Scorpio's foot was on the bottom rope during the pinfall, which led to Bill Alfonso coming out and restarting the match. Paul E. Dangerously confronted Alfonso, which distracted Taz enough for Scorpio to hit him with a chair in the back. Dangerously diverted his attention towards the ring and Alfonso hit him with a chair in the back. Scorpio hit a Tumbleweed with a chair beneath on Taz and covered him for the pinfall and Alfonso counted the pinfall, awarding the win to Scorpio. After the match, Shane Douglas came to the ring and cut a promo on leaving ECW for World Wrestling Federation (WWF). Woman came and offered Douglas to join her and The Sandman, to which Douglas replied and insulted Woman who slapped him in the process. Douglas tried to attack her but Sandman made the save and Cactus Jack then made Sandman and Woman retreat.

Next, Raven and Stevie Richards defended the World Tag Team Championship against Tommy Dreamer and Luna Vachon. Near the end of the match, Vachon nailed a superplex on Richards and then Beulah McGillicutty threw powder in Vachon's face, allowing Richards to pin her to retain the titles. After the match, The Pitbulls came and Raven ordered them to nail a superbomb to Vachon to which Pitbulls refused and then Raven and Richards humiliated them by shoving apple pie in the face and hitting with chair and then Pitbulls retaliated by attacking Raven and Richards, thus turning faces. Pitbulls attempted a superbomb on Richards until Dudley Brothers made the save. After a brawl, Pitbulls and Dreamer cleared the ring of Raven's Nest.

Next, Axl Rotten took on Ian Rotten in a Taipei Deathmatch, which is a very violent and bloody type of hardcore style match (no disqualifications, falls count anywhere) where wrestlers wrestle with broken glass glued to tape wrapped around their hands. Bill Alfonso was appointed the referee by Commissioner Tod Gordon. Alfonso stopped the match after The Public Enemy (Rocco Rock and Johnny Grunge) and The Gangstas (New Jack and Mustafa) began brawling at ringside and Alfonso went after them. Gordon let the match continue. Axl delivered a back body drop to Ian on the thumbtacks laid in the ring and hit a big splash for the victory.

In the penultimate match, The Sandman defended the World Heavyweight Championship against Cactus Jack. Shane Douglas interfered in the match by nailing a Piledriver on Sandman and then nailed Cactus in the face with a Singapore cane and put Sandman on top of Cactus for the pinfall victory, resulting in Sandman retaining the title. After the match, Tod Gordon fired Douglas from ECW, who retaliated by attacking Gordon until 911 made the save and nailed a Chokeslam on Douglas.

=== Main event matches ===
Public Enemy and The Gangstas competed in the main event of the show. Both members of Public Enemy drove New Jack through two tables each and then Rocco Rock smashed a croquet mallet in the back of Mustafa Saed's head for the win.

== Reception ==
Hardcore Heaven received negative reviews from critics. Matt Peddycord of Wrestling Recaps gave negative reviews to the event due to the absence of Eddie Guerrero, Dean Malenko and Chris Benoit, while noting Taz and 2 Cold Scorpio's match as the only watchable match of the event. He gave a "thumbs down" to the event.

Kevin Pantoja of 411Mania rated a score of 2.5 for the event, considering it a very bad event. He stated "On the whole, the show itself isn’t very good. Only two matches are pretty good and the rest is pretty much absolute garbage. Then there’s the overly long Shane Douglas promo that kind of kills the mood. I was also disappointed at the ECW crowd, which was less excited than expected."

The Wrestling Revolution staff wrote "A bad show from ECW. It was barely over two hours, but aside from Taz vs. Scorpio and Cactus vs. Sandman, it dragged along painfully. Most of the matches weren’t good, and there was some silly booking. There was some important storyline stuff, so if you want to check it out for that you can, but I still wouldn’t recommend buying this show."

== Aftermath ==
On the July 4 episode of Hardcore TV, Axl Rotten was named the number one contender to Sandman's World Heavyweight Championship at Heat Wave. Several rivalries from Hardcore Heaven continued into Heat Wave as Taz teamed with Eddie Guerrero to take on 2 Cold Scorpio and Dean Malenko, Public Enemy and The Gangstas competed in a steel cage match, Luna Vachon and Stevie Richards competed in a steel cage match, Hack Meyers faced Val Puccio in a rematch and The Pitbulls teamed with Tommy Dreamer to take on Raven and The Dudley Brothers.

Shane Douglas made his last ECW appearance in Hardcore Heaven as he would leave ECW for a stint in the World Wrestling Federation. It was short and unsuccessful. Douglas returned to ECW at House Party on January 5, 1996.

== Results ==
No.	Results	Stipulations	Times
1	The Dudleys (Snot Dudley and Dudley Dudley) (with Big Dick Dudley) defeated The Pitbulls (#1 and #2) (with Raven, Stevie Richards and Beulah McGillicutty)	Tag team match	06:25
2	Dino Sendoff and Don E. Allen vs. Chad Austin and The Broad Street Bully ended in a no contest	Tag team match	02:10
3	Hack Meyers defeated Big Malley	Singles match	07:37
4	2 Cold Scorpio defeated Taz (with Paul E. Dangerously)	Singles match	09:09
5	Raven and Stevie Richards (c) (with Beulah McGillicutty) defeated Tommy Dreamer and Luna Vachon	Tag team match for the ECW World Tag Team Championship	07:34
6	Axl Rotten defeated Ian Rotten	Taipei Deathmatch	07:10
7	The Sandman (c) (with Woman) defeated Cactus Jack	Singles match for the ECW World Heavyweight Championship	13:05
8	The Public Enemy (Rocco Rock and Johnny Grunge) defeated The Gangstas (New Jack and Mustafa)	Tag team match	11:33
(c) / – the champion(s) heading into the match
