= 1995 in professional wrestling =

1995 in professional wrestling describes the year's events in the world of professional wrestling.

== List of notable promotions ==
These promotions held notable events in 1995.

Promotion Name	Abbreviation	Notes
Asistencia Asesoría y Administración/Lucha Libre AAA Worldwide	AAA	During this year, AAA ceased using the full name, as the company bought out Televisa and became independent, and thus became Lucha Libre AAA Worldwide, but often abbreviated to just AAA.
Catch Wrestling Association	CWA	
Consejo Mundial de Lucha Libre	CMLL	
Extreme Championship Wrestling	ECW	
Frontier Martial-Arts Wrestling	FMW	
New Japan Pro-Wrestling	NJPW	
World Championship Wrestling	WCW	
World Wrestling Council	WWC	
World Wrestling Federation	WWF	

== Calendar of notable shows ==
=== January ===
Date	Promotion(s)	Event	Location	Main Event
January 4	NJPW	Battle 7	Tokyo, Japan	Shinya Hashimoto (c) defeated Kensuke Sasaki in a Singles match for the IWGP Heavyweight Championship
January 22	WWF	Royal Rumble	Tampa, Florida, United States	Shawn Michaels won by last eliminating The British Bulldog in a 30-man Royal Rumble match for a WWF Championship match at WrestleMania XI
January 25	WCW	Clash of the Champions XXX	Paradise, Nevada, United States	Hulk Hogan and Randy Savage defeated Kevin Sullivan and The Butcher in a tag team match
(c) – denotes defending champion(s)

=== February ===
Date	Promotion(s)	Event	Location	Main Event
February 4	ECW	Double Tables	Philadelphia, Pennsylvania, United States	Sabu and The Tazmaniac defeated The Public Enemy (Johnny Grunge and Rocco Rock) (c) in a Double tables match for the ECW World Tag Team Championship
February 19	WCW	SuperBrawl V	Baltimore, Maryland, United States	Hulk Hogan (c) defeated Vader by disqualification in a Singles match for the WCW World Heavyweight Championship
February 25	ECW	Return of the Funker	Philadelphia, Pennsylvania, United States	Cactus Jack defeated D. C. Drake by pinfall in a Singles match
(c) – denotes defending champion(s)

=== March ===
Date	Promotion(s)	Event	Location	Main Event
March 18	ECW	Extreme Warfare	Philadelphia, Pennsylvania, United States	The Sandman and Terry Funk defeated Cactus Jack and Shane Douglas by pinfall in a tag team match
March 19	WCW	Uncensored	Tupelo, Mississippi, United States	Hulk Hogan defeated Vader in a Leather Strap match
March 24	CMLL	Salvador Lutteroth Trios Tournament	Mexico City, Mexico	Bestia Salvaje, Emilio Charles Jr. and Sangre Chicana defeated Los Brazos (Brazo de Oro, Brazo de Plata and El Brazo) in a tournament final
(c) – denotes defending champion(s)

=== April ===
Date	Promotion(s)	Event	Location	Main Event
April 2	WWF	WrestleMania XI	Hartford, Connecticut, United States	Lawrence Taylor defeated Bam Bam Bigelow in a Singles match with Pat Patterson as special guest referee
April 2	AJPW, AJW, Rings, FMW, Go Gundan, IWA Japan, JWP, LLPW, Michinoku, NJPW, Pancrase, PWFG, UWFi	Weekly Pro Wrestling Tokyo Dome Show	Tokyo, Japan	Shinya Hashimoto defeated Masahiro Chono in a Singles match
April 7	CMLL	39. Aniversario de Arena México	Mexico City, Mexico	Héctor Garza defeated El Satánico in a Best two-out-of-three falls Lucha de Apuestas hair vs. hair match
April 7	CMLL	Torneo Gran Alternativa	Mexico City, Mexico	Héctor Garza defeated El Satánico in a Best two-out-of-three falls Lucha de Apuestas hair vs. hair match
April 8	ECW	Three Way Dance	Philadelphia, Pennsylvania, United States	The Public Enemy (Johnny Grunge and Rocco Rock) defeated Chris Benoit and Dean Malenko (c) and Rick Steiner and the Tazmaniac in a Three way dance for the ECW World Tag Team Championship
April 15	ECW	Hostile City Showdown	Philadelphia, Pennsylvania, United States	Cactus Jack defeated Terry Funk in a Singles match
April 28–29	NJPW; WCW	Collision in Korea	Pyongyang, North Korea	Day 1: Shinya Hashimoto (c) wrestled Scott Norton to a time limit draw in a Singles match for the IWGP Heavyweight Championship; Day 2: Antonio Inoki defeated Ric Flair by pinfall in a Singles match
(c) – denotes defending champion(s)

=== May ===
Date	Promotion(s)	Event	Location	Main Event
May 3	NJPW	Wrestling Dontaku	Fukuoka, Japan	Keiji Mutoh defeated Shinya Hashimoto (c) in a Singles match for the IWGP Heavyweight Championship
May 5	FMW	FMW 6th Anniversary Show	Kawasaki, Kanagawa, Japan	Atsushi Onita (c) defeated Hayabusa in a No Rope Exploding Barbed Wire Deathmatch for the FMW Brass Knuckles Heavyweight Championship
May 13	ECW	Enter the Sandman	Philadelphia, Pennsylvania, United States	The Public Enemy (Johnny Grunge and Rocco Rock) (c) defeated the Pitbulls (Pitbull #1 and Pitbull #2) in a Double dog collar match for the ECW World Tag Team Championship
May 14	WWF	In Your House 1	Syracuse, New York, United States	Diesel (c) defeated Sycho Sid by disqualification in a Singles match for the WWF Championship
May 21	WCW	Slamboree	St. Petersburg, Florida, United States	Hulk Hogan and Randy Savage defeated Ric Flair and Vader (with Arn Anderson) in a tag team match
(c) – denotes defending champion(s)

=== June ===
Date	Promotion(s)	Event	Location	Main Event
June 10	AAA	Triplemanía III-A	Orizaba, Veracruz, Mexico	Payasito Rojo lost to Super Muñequito; Other participants included Espectrito I, Espectrito II, Jerrito Estrada, Fuercita Guerrera, Mascarita Sagrada, Mini Calo, Ninjita, Octagoncito, La Parkita, Payasito Azul, and Torerito in a 13-Mini-Estrella Steel Cage Elimination match, Lucha de Apuestas, "Mask vs. Mask" with the last man in the cage being unmasked.
June 17	ECW	Barbed Wire, Hoodies & Chokeslams	Philadelphia, Pennsylvania, United States	The Sandman (c) defeated Cactus Jack by TKO in a Barbed wire match for the ECW World Heavyweight Championship
June 18	AAA	Triplemanía III-B	Tonalá, Jalisco, Mexico	Winners defeated Marabunta in a Best two-out-of-three falls Lucha de Apuestas "Mask vs. Mask" match
June 18	WCW	The Great American Bash	Dayton, Ohio, United States	Ric Flair defeated Randy Savage in a Singles match
June 25	WWF	King of the Ring	Philadelphia, Pennsylvania, United States	Bam Bam Bigelow and Diesel defeated Sycho Sid and Tatanka in a tag team match
June 30	AAA	Triplemanía III-C	Madero, Mexico	Super Caló defeated Winners in a Best two-out-of-three falls Lucha de Apuesta, "Mask vs. Mask" match
June 30	ECW	Mountain Top Madness	Jim Thorpe, Pennsylvania, United States	The Sandman (c) defeated Tommy Dreamer by pinfall in a Singles match for the ECW World Heavyweight Championship
(c) – denotes defending champion(s)

=== July ===
Date	Promotion(s)	Event	Location	Main Event
July 1	ECW	Hardcore Heaven	Philadelphia, Pennsylvania, United States	The Public Enemy (Rocco Rock and Johnny Grunge) defeated The Gangstas (New Jack and Mustafa Saed) in a tag team match
July 7	CMLL	International Gran Prix	Mexico City, Mexico	Headhunter A defeated Vampiro Canadiense in a 1995 International Gran Prix final match
July 8	CWA	Euro Catch Festival in Graz	Graz, Austria	Rambo (c) defeated Jim Neidhart in Round 7 in a Singles match for the CWA World Heavyweight Championship
July 15	ECW	Heat Wave	Philadelphia, Pennsylvania, United States	The Gangstas (New Jack and Mustafa Saed) defeated The Public Enemy (Rocco Rock and Johnny Grunge) in a tag team match
July 16	WCW	Bash at the Beach	Huntington Beach, California, United States	Hulk Hogan (c) defeated Vader by escaping the cage in a steel cage match
July 23	WWF	In Your House 2	Nashville, Tennessee, United States	Diesel (c) defeated Sycho Sid in a Lumberjack match for the WWF Championship
(c) – denotes defending champion(s)

=== August ===
Date	Promotion(s)	Event	Location	Main Event
August 5	ECW	Wrestlepalooza	Philadelphia, Pennsylvania, United States	The Gangstas (Mustafa and New Jack) defeated The Public Enemy (Johnny Grunge and Rocco Rock) in a Stretcher match
August 6	WCW	Clash of the Champions XXXI	Daytona Beach, Florida, United States	Vader defeated Arn Anderson and Ric Flair in a Handicap match
August 13	WWC	WWC 22nd Aniversario	Caguas, Puerto Rico	Carlos Colón (c) vs. Hercules Ayala in a Singles match for the WWC Universal Heavyweight Championship
August 15	NJPW	G1 Climax	Tokyo, Japan	Keiji Mutoh defeated Shinya Hashimoto in the finals
August 27	WWF	SummerSlam	Pittsburgh, Pennsylvania, United States	Diesel (c) defeated King Mabel in a Singles match for the WWF Championship
(c) – denotes defending champion(s)

=== September ===
Date	Promotion(s)	Event	Location	Main Event
September 1	CMLL	Second Generation Tag Team Tournament	Mexico City, Mexico	Apolo Dantés and Emilio Charles Jr. defeated El Hijo del Santo and Rayo de Jalisco Jr. in a tournament final match
September 17	WCW	Fall Brawl	Asheville, North Carolina, United States	Hulk Hogan, Randy Savage, Lex Luger and Sting defeated The Dungeon of Doom (Kamala, The Zodiac, The Shark and Meng) in a WarGames match
September 19	ECW	Gangstas Paradise	Philadelphia, Pennsylvania, United States	Mikey Whipwreck and The Public Enemy (Johnny Grunge and Rocco Rock) defeated 2 Cold Scorpio, New Jack and The Sandman in a Gangstas Paradise Cage match
September 22	CMLL	CMLL 62nd Anniversary Show	Mexico City, Mexico	Miguel Perez, Jr. defeated Silver King in a Best two-out-of-three falls Lucha de Apuesta, hair vs. hair match
September 24	WWF	In Your House 3	Saginaw, Michigan, United States	Two Dudes with Attitudes (Diesel (WWF World Heavyweight) and Shawn Michaels (WWF Intercontinental)) defeated The British Bulldog and Yokozuna (WWF Tag Team) in a tag team match for the WWF World Tag Team Championship, WWF Intercontinental Championship, and WWF World Heavyweight Championship
(c) – denotes defending champion(s)

=== October ===
Date	Promotion(s)	Event	Location	Main Event
October 22	WWF	In Your House 4	Winnipeg, Manitoba, Canada	The British Bulldog defeated Diesel (c) by disqualification in a Singles match for the WWF Championship
October 26	CMLL	Copa de Oro	Mexico City, Mexico	Máscara Mágica and Ringo Mendoza defeated Chicago Express and Pierroth Jr. in a tournament final match
October 29	WCW	Halloween Havoc	Detroit, Michigan, United States	The Giant defeated Hulk Hogan (c) by disqualification in a Singles match for the WCW World Heavyweight Championship
(c) – denotes defending champion(s)

=== November ===
Date	Promotion(s)	Event	Location	Main Event
November 18	ECW	November to Remember	Philadelphia, Pennsylvania, United States	Terry Funk and Tommy Dreamer defeated Raven and Cactus Jack in a tag team match
November 19	WWF	Survivor Series	Landover, Maryland, United States	Bret Hart defeated Diesel (c) in a No Disqualification match for the WWF Championship
November 26	WCW	World War 3	Norfolk, Virginia, United States	Randy Savage won by last eliminating One Man Gang in a 60-man World War 3 match for the vacant WCW World Heavyweight Championship
(c) – denotes defending champion(s)

=== December ===
Date	Promotion(s)	Event	Location	Main Event
December 9	ECW	December to Dismember	Philadelphia, Pennsylvania, United States	Tommy Dreamer, The Public Enemy (Johnny Grunge and Rocco Rock) and the Pitbulls (Pitbull #1 and Pitbull #2) defeated Raven, the Heavenly Bodies (Jimmy Del Ray and Tom Prichard), the Eliminators (Perry Saturn and John Kronus) and Stevie Richards by pinfall
December 15	Stampede	Stu Hart Tribute Show	Calgary, Alberta, Canada	Bret Hart (c) defeated Davey Boy Smith in a singles match for the WWF Championship
December 16	CWA	Euro Catch Festival in Bremen	Bremen, Germany	Ludvig Borga defeated Rambo (c) in Round 6 in a Singles match for the CWA World Heavyweight Championship
December 17	WWF	In Your House 5	Hershey, Pennsylvania, United States	Bret Hart (c) defeated The British Bulldog in a Singles match for the WWF Championship
December 21	FMW	Year End Spectacular	Yokohama, Japan	Hayabusa, The Great Sasuke and Koji Nakagawa defeated Super Delfin, Ricky Fuji and TAKA Michinoku in a Six-man tag team match
December 22	FMW	Yamato Nadeshiko II	Tokyo, Japan	Megumi Kudo defeated Shark Tsuchiya in a No Ropes Barbed Wire Death Match
December 27	WCW	Starrcade	Nashville, Tennessee, United States	Ric Flair defeated Randy Savage (c) in a Singles match for the WCW World Heavyweight Championship
December 29	ECW	Holiday Hell	Queens, New York, United States	Sabu defeated Cactus Jack by pinfall in an "Olympic Rules" match
(c) – denotes defending champion(s)

== Notable events ==
- May 14 – The first WWF in Your House two hour PPV debuts in Syracuse, NY with a Sycho Sid vs WWF World Heavyweight Champion "Big Daddy Cool" Diesel main event.
- September 4 – WCW Monday Nitro debut on TNT and with it the official start of the Monday Night War
- The Universal Wrestling Association closed.
- November 9 – WCW Pro debut their first episode from the Disney/MGM Studios in their custom arena.
- November 26 – SMW closed their doors after their final live event in Cookeville, Tennessee wrapping up the SMW vs USWA feud.

== Accomplishments and tournaments ==
=== AJW ===
Accomplishment	Winner	Date won	Notes
Japan Grand Prix 1995	Manami Toyota	September 3	
Rookie of the Year Decision Tournament	Mari Mogami		
Tag League The Best 1995	Kyoko Inoue and Tomoko Watanabe	December 10	

=== AJPW ===
Accomplishment	Winner	Date won	Notes
Champion Carnival 1995	Mitsuharu Misawa	April 15	
World's Strongest Determination League 1995	Toshiaki Kawada and Akira Taue	December 9	

=== GAEA ===
Accomplishment	Winner	Date won	Notes
Splash J and Running G	KAORU, Meiko Satomura & Tomoko Kuzumi	September 23	

=== JWP ===
Accomplishment	Winner	Date won	Notes
Blue Star Cup 1995	Carlos Amano		

=== WCW ===
Accomplishment	Winner	Date won	Notes
Slim Jim Challenge	Paul Orndorff	May 27	
WCW United States Championship Tournament	Sting	June 18	
World War 3	Randy Savage	November 26	

==== WCW Hall of Fame ====
Inductee
Wahoo McDaniel
Dusty Rhodes
Antonio Inoki
Angelo Poffo
Terry Funk
Big John Studd
Gordon Solie

=== WWF ===
Accomplishment	Winner	Date won	Notes
Royal Rumble	Shawn Michaels	January 22	
WWF Tag Team Championship Tournament	The 1–2–3 Kid and Bob Holly	January 22	
King of the Ring	Mabel	June 25	

==== WWF Hall of Fame ====
Category	Inductee	Inducted by
Individual	Antonino Rocca	Diesel
Individual	"Big Cat" Ernie Ladd	Bobo Brazil
Individual	George "The Animal" Steele	Doink the Clown
Individual	Ivan Putski	Scott Putski
Individual	The Fabulous Moolah	Alundra Blayze
Individual	The Grand Wizard	Sgt. Slaughter
Individual	Pedro Morales	Savio Vega

== Awards and honors ==
=== Pro Wrestling Illustrated ===
Category	Winner
PWI Wrestler of the Year	Diesel
PWI Tag Team of the Year	Harlem Heat (Booker T and Stevie Ray)
PWI Match of the Year	Diesel vs. Shawn Michaels (WrestleMania XI)
PWI Feud of the Year	Axl Rotten vs. Ian Rotten
PWI Most Popular Wrestler of the Year	Shawn Michaels
PWI Most Hated Wrestler of the Year	Jerry Lawler
PWI Comeback of the Year	Randy Savage
PWI Most Improved Wrestler of the Year	Diamond Dallas Page
PWI Most Inspirational Wrestler of the Year	Barry Horowitz
PWI Rookie of the Year	Alex Wright
PWI Lifetime Achievement	Ricky Steamboat
PWI Editor's Award	Jim Cornette

=== Wrestling Observer Newsletter ===
Category	Winner
Wrestler of the Year	Mitsuharu Misawa
Most Outstanding	Manami Toyota
Feud of the Year	Eddie Guerrero vs. Dean Malenko
Tag Team of the Year	Mitsuharu Misawa and Kenta Kobashi
Most Improved	Johnny B. Badd
Best on Interviews	Cactus Jack

== Title changes ==
=== ECW ===
ECW World Heavyweight Championship
Incoming champion – Shane Douglas
Date	Winner	Event/Show	Note(s)
April 15	The Sandman	Hostile City Showdown	
October 28	Mikey Whipwreck	Live event	
December 9	The Sandman	December to Dismember	

ECW World Television Championship
Incoming champion – Dean Malenko
Date	Winner	Event/Show	Note(s)
March 18	2 Cold Scorpio	ECW Hardcore TV	
April 8	Eddie Guerrero	Three Way Dance	
July 21	Dean Malenko	ECW Hardcore TV	
July 28	Eddie Guerrero	ECW Hardcore TV	
August 25	2 Cold Scorpio	Live event	
December 29	Mikey Whipwreck	Holiday Hell	This was a match where Scorpio put both his World Television Championship and the ECW World Tag Team Championship held by Scorpio and The Sandman on the line.

ECW World Tag Team Championship
Incoming champions – The Public Enemy (Johnny Grunge and Rocco Rock)
Date	Winner	Event/Show	Note(s)
February 4	The Dangerous Alliance (Sabu and The Tazmaniac)	Double Tables	
February 25	The Triple Threat (Chris Benoit and Dean Malenko)	Return of the Funker	
April 8	The Public Enemy (Johnny Grunge and Rocco Rock)	Three Way Dance	
June 30	Raven and Stevie Richards	Mountain Top Madness	
September 19	The Pitbulls (Pitbull #1 and Pitbull #2)	Gangstas Paradise	
October 7	Raven and Stevie Richards	Hardcore TV #131	
October 7	The Public Enemy (Johnny Grunge and Rocco Rock)	Hardcore TV #131	
October 28	2 Cold Scorpio and The Sandman	Hardcore TV #133	
December 29	Cactus Jack and Mikey Whipwreck	Holiday Hell	

=== FMW ===
FMW Brass Knuckles Heavyweight Championship
Incoming champion – Atsushi Onita
Date	Winner	Event/Show	Note(s)
January 21	Mr. Pogo	FMW	
May 4	Atsushi Onita	FMW	
May 5	Vacant	6th Anniversary Show	
June 27	Hayabusa	FMW	
June 27	Vacant	FMW	
September 26	The Gladiator	FMW	

FMW Brass Knuckles Tag Team Championship
Incoming champions – W*ING Alliance (Mr. Pogo and The Gladiator)
Date	Winner	Event/Show	Note(s)
February 24	Atsushi Onita and Mr. Gannosuke	FMW	
March 7	W*ING Alliance (Mr. Pogo and The Gladiator)	FMW	
May 5	Lethal Weapon (Ricky Fuji and Hisakatsu Oya)	6th Anniversary Show	
September 5	Daisuke Ikeda and Yoshiaki Fujiwara	Grand Slam Tour	
December 21	Lethal Weapon (Ricky Fuji and Hisakatsu Oya)	Year End Spectacular	

FMW Independent World Junior Heavyweight Championship
Incoming champion – Ricky Fuji
Date	Winner	Event/Show	Note(s)
February 6	Hideki Hosaka	House show	
March 30	Koji Nakagawa	House show	
Unknown	Vacated	N/A	
November 20	Koji Nakagawa	House show	

FMW Women's Championship
Incoming champion – Vacant
Date	Winner	Event/Show	Note(s)
March 30	Bad Nurse Nakamura	FMW	
May 5	Megumi Kudo	6th Anniversary Show	
November 20	Shark Tsuchiya	FMW	
December 10	Combat Toyoda	FMW	

=== NJPW ===
IWGP Heavyweight Championship
Incoming champion – Shinya Hashimoto
Date	Winner	Event/Show	Note(s)
May 3	Keiji Mutoh	Wrestling Dontaku 1995	

IWGP Tag Team Championship
Incoming champions – Hiroshi Hase and Keiji Mutoh
Date	Winner	Event/Show	Note(s)
May 6	Vacant	N/A	
June 10	Cho-Ten (Hiroyoshi Tenzan and Masahiro Chono)	Fighting Spirit Legend	
July 7	Vacant	N/A	
July 13	Junji Hirata and Shinya Hashimoto	Best of the Super Jr. II	

IWGP Junior Heavyweight Championship
Incoming champion – Norio Honaga
Date	Winner	Event/Show	Note(s)
February 19	Koji Kanemoto	Live event	
May 3	Sabu	Wrestling Dontaku 1995	
June 14	Koji Kanemoto	Live event	

=== WCW ===
WCW World Heavyweight Championship
Incoming champion – Hulk Hogan
Date	Winner	Event/Show	Note(s)
October 29	The Giant	Halloween Havoc	
November 6	Vacated	Nitro	
November 26	Randy Savage	World War 3	
December 27	Ric Flair	Starrcade	

WCW United States Heavyweight Championship
Incoming champion – Vader
Date	Winner	Event/Show	Note(s)
March 25	Vacated	Saturday Night	Vader was stripped of the title by WCW commissioner Nick Bockwinkel for hospitalizing Dave Sullivan one week prior
June 18	Sting	The Great American Bash	Defeated Meng in a tournament final
November 13	Kensuke Sasaki	WCW World in Japan	
December 27	One Man Gang	Starrcade	Won in a post-PPV dark match. Although the match was restarted and Kensuke Sasaki subsequently retained the title, it was never acknowledged by WCW, nor is it acknowledged by WWE

WCW World Television Championship
Incoming champion – Johnny B. Badd
Date	Winner	Event/Show	Note(s)
January 8	Arn Anderson	Main Event	
June 18	The Renegade	The Great American Bash	
September 17	Diamond Dallas Page	Fall Brawl	
October 29	Johnny B. Badd	Halloween Havoc	

WCW World Tag Team Championship
Incoming champions – Harlem Heat (Booker T and Stevie Ray)
Date	Winner	Event/Show	Note(s)
May 21	The Nasty Boys (Jerry Sags and Brian Knobbs)	Slamboree	
May 3	Harlem Heat (Booker T and Stevie Ray)	WorldWide	Aired on tape delay on June 24.
June 21	Dick Slater and Bunkhouse Buck	Saturday Night	Aired on tape delay on June 24.
September 17	Harlem Heat (Booker T and Stevie Ray)	Fall Brawl	
September 18	The American Males (Marcus Alexander Bagwell and Scotty Riggs)	Nitro	
September 27	Harlem Heat (Booker T and Stevie Ray)	Saturday Night	Aired on tape delay on October 28.

=== WWF ===
WWF World Heavyweight Championship
Incoming champion – Diesel
Date	Winner	Event/Show	Note(s)
November 19	Bret Hart	Survivor Series	It was a No Disqualification Match for the WWF Championship.

WWF Intercontinental Championship
Incoming champion – Razor Ramon
Date	Winner	Event/Show	Note(s)
January 22	Jeff Jarrett	Royal Rumble	
April 26	Vacant	WWF Action Zone	Held up when match between Jeff Jarrett and Bob "Spark Plug" Holly ended in controversy
April 26	Jeff Jarrett	WWF Action Zone	Aired on tape delay on May 7
May 19	Razor Ramon	House show	
May 21	Jeff Jarrett	House show	
July 23	Shawn Michaels	In Your House 2: The Lumberjacks	
October 22	Dean Douglas	In Your House 4	Won the title by forfeit due to Shawn Michaels being attacked outside a nightclub in Syracuse, NY on October 14, 1995
October 22	Razor Ramon	In Your House 4	

WWF Women's Championship
Incoming champion – Bull Nakano
Date	Winner	Event/Show	Note(s)
April 3	Alundra Blayze	Raw	
August 27	Bertha Faye	SummerSlam	
October 23	Alundra Blayze	Raw	
December 13	Deactivated	N/A	Title deactivated when Blayze left the WWF. Blayze then joined World Championship Wrestling and, during Nitro in Augusta, GA on December 18 dropped the title belt in a trash can

WWF Tag Team Championship
Incoming champions – Vacated
Date	Winner	Event/Show	Note(s)
January 22	The 1–2–3 Kid and Bob Holly	Royal Rumble	
January 23	The Smoking Gunns (Billy and Bart Gunn)	Raw	
April 2	Owen Hart and Yokozuna	WrestleMania XI	
September 24	Two Dudes with Attitudes (Diesel and Shawn Michaels)	In Your House 3: Triple Header	
September 25	Owen Hart and Yokozuna	Raw	
September 25	The Smoking Gunns (Billy and Bart Gunn)	Raw	

Million Dollar Championship
(Title recreated)
unsanctioned championship
Date	Winner	Event/Show	Note(s)
December 18	The Ringmaster	Raw	Aired on tape delay on January 8, 1996.

== Births ==
- April 1
  - Lena Kross
  - Logan Paul
- May 15 – Dragon Lee (wrestler)
- May 28 – Takehiro Yamamura
- May 29 – Konosuke Takeshita
- June 9
  - Tony D'Angelo
  - Tay Melo
- June 26 – Ryuya Takekura
- July 19 – Natsupoi
- July 26 – Tessa Blanchard
- August 7 – Kris Statlander
- August 19 – The Velveteen Dream
- August 29 – Rey Celestial (died in 2017)
- October 16 – Fuego Del Sol
- October 28 – Mansoor
- October 29 – Karmen Petrovic
- November 9 – Yuki Ishikawa
- November 22 – Jay Joshua
- November 28 – Sean Legacy
- December 1 – Aaron Rourke
- December 10 – Satnam Singh
- December 17 – Kazumasa Yoshida
- December 26 – Issei Onitsuka

== Debuts ==
=== Uncertain debut date ===
- Chyna
- Adam Rose
- Umaga
- Akira Shoji
- Alex Shane
- Steve McMichael
- Bull Buchanan
- Hardbody Harrison

=== Debut date ===
- January 8 – Yuki Miyazaki and Tsubasa Kuragaki
- January 13 - Kanako Motoya
- January 19 - Abyss
- January 28 - Lenny Lane
- February 10 - Keiko Aono
- February 16 - Sanshiro Takagi
- February 17 - Kancho Nagase
- March 31 - Shinigami and Onryo
- April 15 - Chikayo Nagashima, Sugar Sato, Toshie Uematsu and Meiko Satomura
- May 24 - Cosmo*Soldier
- June – Christian
- July 23 - Tyson Kidd
- July 29 - Makie Numao
- August 18 - Muhammad Yone and Alexander Otsuka
- September 13 - Takashi Sato
- October 4 - Mari Mogami (All Japan Women's)
- October 13 – Kuuga
- October 14 - Kayo Noumi (All Japan Women's)
- October 18 - Averno
- October 25 - Miss Mongol (FMW)
- November 12 - Shadow WX
- December 27 - Nosawa Rongai

== Retirements ==
- Lord Alfred Hayes (1950s–1995)
- Animal Hamaguchi (1969–1995)
- Archie Gouldie (November 2, 1962 – September 2, 1995)
- Baron von Raschke (1966–1995)
- Bryant Anderson (1993–1995)
- Dan Spivey (1983–October 1995)
- Francisco Flores (1960s-1995)
- Gordon Solie (1950s–1995)
- Jack Tunney (September 2, 1984 – July 12, 1995)
- Jim Crockett, Jr. (1973–1994)
- John Tatum (1983–1995)
- Jorge Gonzalez (May 19, 1990 – December 8, 1995)
- Jos LeDuc (1968–1995)
- Junkyard Dog (1976–1995)
- Kevin Von Erich (1976–1995)
- Lou Albano (1953–1995)
- Pete Sanchez (1958-1995)
- Pez Whatley (1973–1998)
- Phil Apollo (1986-1995)
- The Sheik (1947-1995, did not announce his retirement until 1998)
- El Supremo (1976–1995)
- Toni Adams (1985–1995)

== Deaths ==
- January 22 – Jerry Blackwell, 45
- February 18 – Eddie Gilbert, 33
- March 20 – Big John Studd, 47
- April 11 - Harry Pennington (wrestler), 92
- May 10 - Ilio DiPaolo, 68
- May 28 - Chris Colt, 48
- July 31 - Harry Madison, 85
- August 24 – Killer Karl Krupp, 61
- September 30 - Treacherous Philips, 66
- October 2 – John Ayers, 42
- December 4 – Little Beaver, 60
- December 20 - Benny Ramírez, 63

== See also ==
- List of WCW pay-per-view events
- List of WWF pay-per-view events
- List of ECW supercards and pay-per-view events
- List of FMW supercards and pay-per-view events
