= Mountain Top Madness =

Extreme Championship Wrestling live events

Mountain Top Madness was the name of two professional wrestling live events produced by the professional wrestling promotion Extreme Championship Wrestling (ECW) in 1995 and 1997 respectively. Both events were held at the Flagstaff in Jim Thorpe, Pennsylvania in the United States.

== 1995 ==
Mountain Top Madness
- Promotion: Extreme Championship Wrestling
- Date: June 30, 1995
- City: Jim Thorpe, Pennsylvania, US
- Venue: The Flagstaff
- Attendance: c. 385

Event chronology
← Previous; Barbed Wire, Hoodies & Chokeslams	Next → Hardcore Heaven

ECW Mountain Top Madness chronology
← Previous; First	Next → 1997

The first Mountain Top Madness was produced by Extreme Championship Wrestling (ECW) on June 30, 1995, the night prior to Hardcore Heaven. The event was held at the Flagstaff in Jim Thorpe, Pennsylvania in the United States, with around 385 attendees. A "fan cam" recording of the event was released on DVD by ECW.

=== Event ===
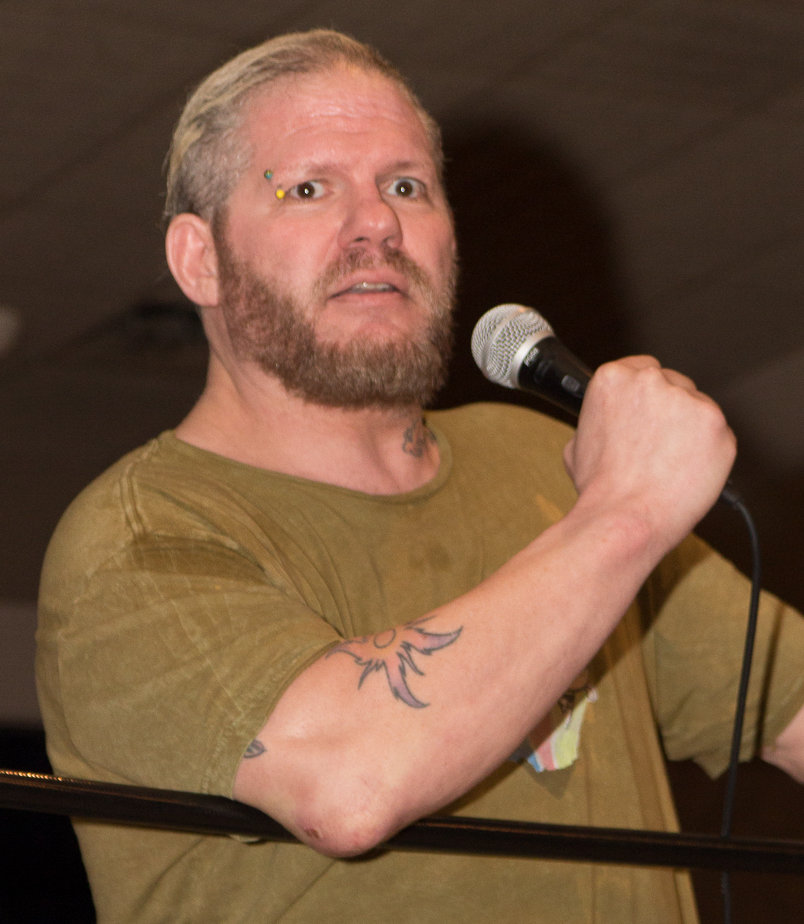
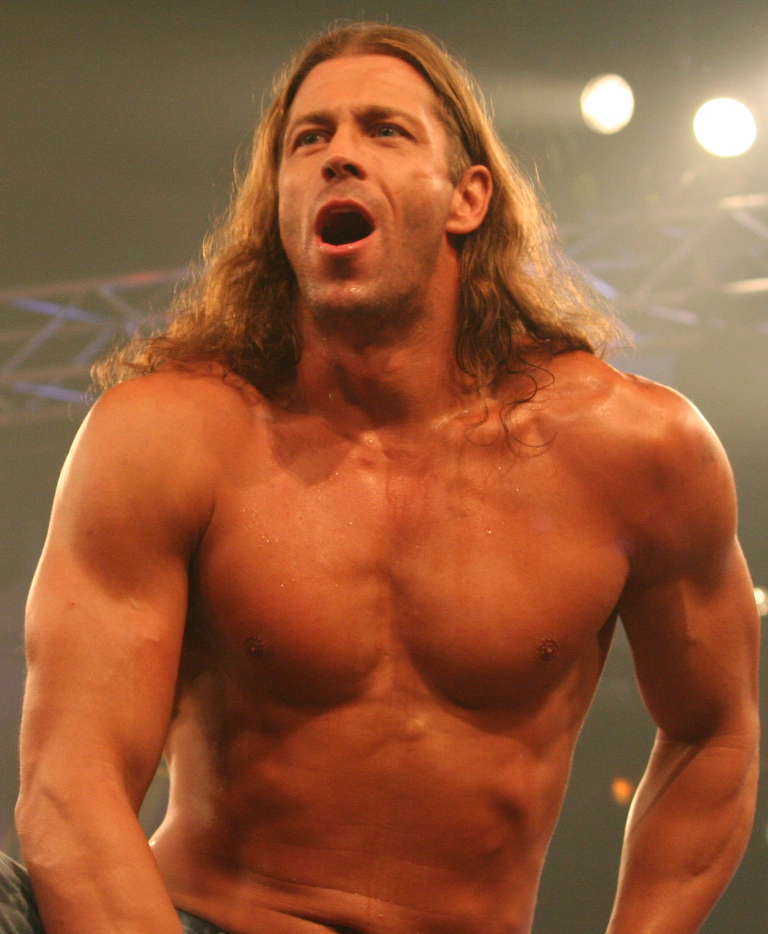
Raven (top) and Stevie Richards (bottom) won the ECW World Tag Team Championship at Mountain Top Madness.

The opening bout was a tag team match pitting Dino Sandoff and Don E. Allen against the Pitbulls. The Pitbulls won the bout in a squash, pinning Allen following a aided superbomb by pinfall. The Pitbulls - who at the time were members of Raven's Nest - were accompanied to ringside by Raven, Stevie Richards, and Beulah McGillicutty; during the match, Francine, who was seated at ringside, flirted with Richards, resulting in McGuillicutty bickering with Francine until Raven led Richards and McGuillicutty backstage.

The second bout was a singles match between 2 Cold Scorpio and Hack Meyers. 2 Cold Scorpio won the bout by pinfall following a 450° splash.

The third bout was scheduled to be a singles match between Mikey Whipwreck and Taz, but Whipwreck was unable to compete due to a separated shoulder. He was replaced by Chad Austin, who sucker punched Taz. After Taz knocked Austin out with a Taz-plex, referee Bill Alfonso (who would incur the ire of the ECW audience by enforcing rules that were otherwise largely overlooked, invariably to the advantage of heels) disqualified him for striking his opponent before the bell. As Taz went to confront Alfonso, he was attacked by 2 Cold Scorpio, his opponent for the following evening at Hardcore Heaven, who injured his neck by giving him a tombstone piledriver followed by a somersault leg drop.

The fourth bout was a barbed wire baseball bat match between Axl Rotten and Ian Rotten. Axl Rotten won the bout by pinfall after giving Ian Rotten a leg drop using the titular bat.

Following the fourth bout, Cactus Jack confronted Shane Douglas in the ring.

The fifth bout saw ECW World Tag Team Champions the Public Enemy defend their titles against Raven and Stevie Richards. Raven and Richards defeated the Public Enemy to win the titles when Richards pinned Rocco Rock after the Gangstas interfered, hitting Rock with a pipe and dragging an unconscious Richards on top of Rock. An attempt by a referee to reverse the decision due to the interference was in turn overturned by Bill Alfonso. Following the match, Richards issued an open challenge, prompting 911 to come to the ring and chokeslam Raven and Richards. After Alfonso confronted him, 911 chokeslammed him as well.

The main event ECW World Heavyweight Champion saw the Sandman defend his title against Tommy Dreamer. Before the match, Raven and Stevie Richards attacked Dreamer as he approached the ring, injuring his hand. The Sandman won the bout after his manager, Woman, distracted Dreamer, enabling the Sandman to strike him in his injured hand with his Singapore cane then pin Dreamer using a small package to retain his title.

=== Results ===
No.	Results	Stipulations
1	The Pitbulls (Pitbull #1 and Pitbull #2) (with Raven, Stevie Richards, and Beulah McGillicutty) defeated Dino Sandoff and Don E. Allen by pinfall	Tag team match
2	2 Cold Scorpio defeated Hack Meyers by pinfall	Singles match
3	Chad Austin defeated Taz (with Paul E. Dangerously) by disqualification	Singles match
4	Axl Rotten defeated Ian Rotten by pinfall	Barbed wire baseball bat match
5	Raven and Stevie Richards defeated the Public Enemy (Johnny Grunge and Rocco Rock) (c) by pinfall	Tag team match for the ECW World Tag Team Championship
6	The Sandman (c) (with Woman) defeated Tommy Dreamer by pinfall	Singles match for the ECW World Heavyweight Championship
(c) / – the champion(s) heading into the match

== 1997 ==
Mountain Top Madness
- Promotion: Extreme Championship Wrestling
- Date: February 28, 1997
- City: Jim Thorpe, Pennsylvania, US
- Venue: The Flagstaff
- Attendance: c. 400

Event chronology
← Previous; CyberSlam	Next → Hostile City Showdown

ECW Mountain Top Madness chronology
← Previous; 1995	Next → Last

The second Mountain Top Madness was produced by Extreme Championship Wrestling (ECW) on February 28, 1997. The event was held at the Flagstaff in Jim Thorpe, Pennsylvania in the United States, with around 400 attendees. A "fan cam" recording of the event was released on DVD.

=== Event ===
The opening bout was a singles match between Chris Chetti and Little Guido. The bout was won by Little Guido.

The second bout was a singles match between Balls Mahoney and Taz. The bout was won by Taz.

The third bout was a singles match between Rob Van Dam and Spike Dudley. The bout was won by Van Dam.

The fourth bout saw ECW World Tag Team Champions the Eliminators defend their titles against the Pitbulls. The Eliminators won the bout to retain their titles.

The fifth bout was a singles match between D-Von Dudley and Tommy Dreamer in a rematch from their bout on the February 24, 1997 episode of Monday Night Raw. The bout was won by Dreamer.

The sixth bout was a singles match between Buh Buh Ray Dudley and the Sandman. The bout was won by The Sandman.

The seventh bout saw ECW World Heavyweight Champion Raven defend his title against Louie Spicolli. Raven won the bout, retaining his title.

The main event was a singles match between Chris Candido and Sabu. The bout was won by Sabu.

=== Results ===
No.	Results	Stipulations
1	Little Guido defeated Chris Chetti	Singles match
2	Taz defeated Balls Mahoney	Singles match
3	Rob Van Dam defeated Spike Dudley	Singles match
4	The Eliminators (Kronus and Saturn) (c) defeated the Pitbulls (Pitbull #1 and Pitbull #2)	Tag team match for the ECW World Tag Team Championship
5	Tommy Dreamer defeated D-Von Dudley	Singles match
6	The Sandman defeated Buh Buh Ray Dudley	Singles match
7	Raven (c) defeated Louie Spicolli	Singles match for the ECW World Heavyweight Championship
8	Sabu defeated Chris Candido	Singles match
(c) / – the champion(s) heading into the match
