= ECW As Good as It Gets =

1997 Extreme Championship Wrestling live event

As Good as It Gets
- The ECW Arena
- Promotion: Extreme Championship Wrestling
- Date: September 20, 1997 (aired September 20, September 27, October 4, and October 11, 1997)
- City: Philadelphia, Pennsylvania, U.S.
- Venue: ECW Arena
- Attendance: c.1,600

Event chronology
← Previous; Terry Funk's WrestleFest	Next → Ultimate Jeopardy

As Good as It Gets was a professional wrestling live event produced by Extreme Championship Wrestling (ECW) on September 20, 1997. The event was held in the ECW Arena in Philadelphia, Pennsylvania in the United States. Excerpts from As Good as It Gets aired on the syndicated television show ECW Hardcore TV in late September and early October 1997, while the event was released on VHS in 1997 and on DVD in 2003. The bout between Beulah McGillicutty and Bill Alfonso was included in the 2005 compilation DVD BloodSport - The Most Violent Matches of ECW.

As Good as It Gets is known for the confrontation between Alfonso and McGillicutty, described as "five of the most intense minutes in ECW"; the bout between Bam Bam Bigelow and Spike Dudley, which featured the "must-see moment" of Bigelow lifting Dudley overhead and hurtling him into the audience; and the bout between the recently debuted Jerry Lynn and Justin Credible, which was used to introduce and showcase the two future ECW mainstays.

== Event ==
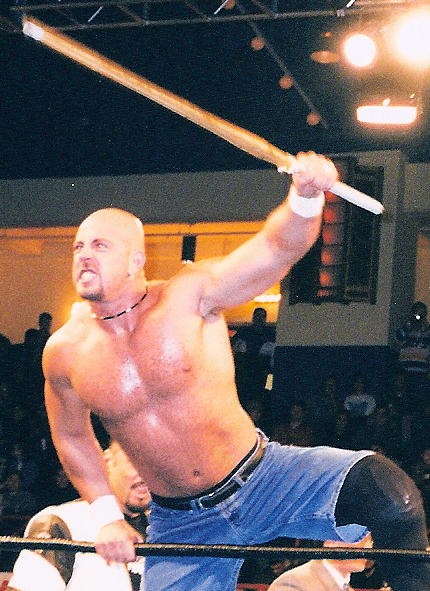
Future ECW World Heavyweight Champion Justin Credible was showcased at As Good as It Gets.

The event was attended by approximately 1,600 people.

The opening bout was a tag team match pitting the Full Blooded Italians against the Hardcore Chair Swingin' Freaks. Balls Mahoney pinned Little Guido using the Nutcracker Suite, but Tommy Rich put Little Guido's foot on the ropes to break the pinfall, causing referee Jeff Jones to restart the match. Little Guido then pinned Balls Mahoney with a roll-up while he was still celebrating. Following the match, Jones bragged that with ECW commissioner Tod Gordon having left, he was now the highest authority in ECW, prompting senior referee Jim Molineaux to confront him before Mahoney gave Jones a chair shot.

The second bout was a singles match between Jerry Lynn and Justin Credible, both of whom had recently debuted in ECW. Credible won the match, pinning Lynn after performing That's Incredible! on him followed by a swinging DDT.

The third bout was a singles match between Chris Candido and Lance Storm. Candido defeated Storm by pinfall after performing the Blonde Bombshell on him.

The fourth match was a singles bout between Bam Bam Bigelow and Spike Dudley. During the match, the much larger Bigelow used his power to dominate Dudley, at one point lifting him overhead and throwing him into the audience. Bigelow won the match by pinning Dudley with a diving splash. Following the match, Bigelow threw Dudley into the audience once again.

The fifth bout saw ECW World Heavyweight Champion Shane Douglas defend his title against a mystery opponent, who was revealed as Phil Lafon. Douglas defeated Lafon by pinfall using a jackknife hold with assistance from Chris Candido.

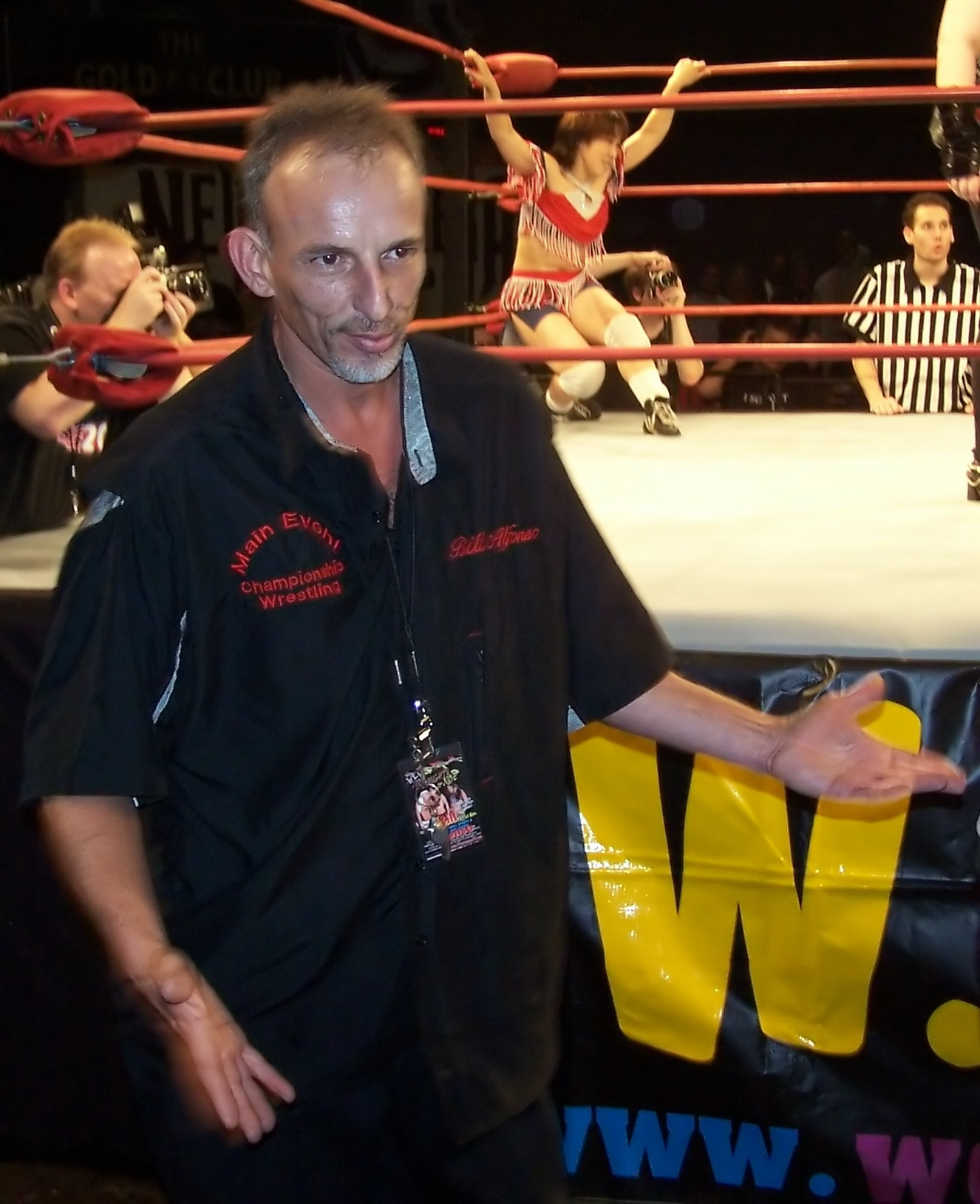
Bill Alfonso faced Beulah McGillicutty in a bloody intergender match at As Good as It Gets.

Following the fifth bout, the Pitbulls (making their return after being absent for several months) came to the ring with Lance Wright, who was leading a faction of wrestlers who were "invading" ECW from the World Wrestling Federation. Pitbull #1 challenged Taz to face Pitbull #2. Taz came to the ring, receiving a powerbomb from Pitbull #2 before rallying to give Pitbull #2 a T-bone Tazplex following by the Tazmission. After Pitbull #1 pulled Pitbull #2 out of the ring, Taz attacked Lance Wright, giving him a T-bone Tazplex through a table at ringside. Taz then brawled with security guards until his rival Sabu came to the ring, with the two men brawling until they were separated.

The sixth bout was a singles match between Sabu and the Sandman. The match ended in a no contest after Sabu threw a fireball in the Sandman's face.

The penultimate bout was an intergender tag team match pitting Beulah McGillicutty and Tommy Dreamer against Bill Alfonso and Rob Van Dam. Early in the match, Dreamer injured his leg while performing a move from the top rope to the floor of the arena. After several minutes, Sabu came to the ring to help Van Dam, with the two men ultimately putting Dreamer through a table with a combination diving leg drop and Five Star Frog Splash. Van Dam then walked out on the match, while Dreamer was ruled to be unable to continue. The match was left as Alfonso versus McGillicutty. After McGillicutty hit Alfonso with a baking tray she had concealed under her shirt, he began bleeding heavily. The match ended when Alfonso attempted to give McGillicutty a powerbomb, only for her to reverse the move into a Hurricanrana for a pinfall victory. Following the match, Alfonso was hospitalized for blood loss.

The main event saw ECW World Tag Team Champions the Dudley Boyz defend their titles against the Gangstanators. The Gangstanators defeated the Dudley Boys to win the titles after John Kronus pinned D-Von Dudley with a 450° splash.

== Results ==
No.	Results	Stipulations	Times
1	The Full Blooded Italians (Little Guido and Tracy Smothers) (with Tommy Rich) defeated the Hardcore Chair Swingin' Freaks (Axl Rotten and Balls Mahoney) by pinfall	Tag team match	8:42
2	Justin Credible (with Jason) defeated Jerry Lynn by pinfall	Singles match	10:29
3	Chris Candido defeated Lance Storm by pinfall	Singles match	14:14
4	Bam Bam Bigelow defeated Spike Dudley by pinfall	Singles match	5:22
5	Shane Douglas (c) (with Francine) defeated Phil Lafon (with Doug Furnas) by pinfall	Singles match for the ECW World Heavyweight Championship	12:06
6	Sabu (with Bill Alfonso) vs. the Sandman ended in a no contest	Singles match	9:16
7	Beulah McGillicutty and Tommy Dreamer defeated Bill Alfonso and Rob Van Dam	Intergender tag team match	—
8	The Gangstanators (Kronus and New Jack) defeated the Dudley Boyz (Buh Buh Ray Dudley and D-Von Dudley) (c) (with Big Dick Dudley, Joel Gertner, and Sign Guy Dudley) by pinfall	Tag team match for the ECW World Tag Team Championship	6:16
(c) / – the champion(s) heading into the match
