= Barbed Wire, Hoodies & Chokeslams =

1995 Extreme Championship Wrestling live event

- The ECW Arena
- Promotion: Extreme Championship Wrestling
- Date: June 17, 1995
- City: Philadelphia, Pennsylvania, US
- Venue: ECW Arena
- Attendance: 1,150

Event chronology
← Previous; Enter the Sandman	Next → Mountain Top Madness

Barbed Wire, Hoodies & Chokeslams was a professional wrestling live event produced by Extreme Championship Wrestling (ECW) on June 17, 1995. The event was held in the ECW Arena in Philadelphia, Pennsylvania, United States.

Excerpts from Barbed Wire, Hoodies & Chokeslams aired on the syndicated television show ECW Hardcore TV, while the full event was released on VHS in 1995. It was made available for streaming on the WWE Network in 2020.

== Event ==
The commentator for Barbed Wire, Hoodies & Chokeslams was Joey Styles. The event was attended by approximately 1,150 people.

The opening match pitted Tony Stetson - wrestling as the "Broad Street Bully" - against the "New Jersey Devil" (Doug Gentry) in a reference to the defeat of the Philadelphia Flyers in the 1995 Stanley Cup playoffs by eventual winners the New Jersey Devils several days prior. Wearing a Philadelphia Flyers hockey jersey, the Bully defeated the Devil by pinfall in 16 seconds with a flurry of punches. Following the match, the Devil attacked the Bully with a hockey stick until 911 came to the ring and repeatedly chokeslammed him.

In the second match, Mikey Whipwreck defeated the much larger Val Puccio by pinfall after a series of low blows followed by a DDT.

The third match saw the debuting Vampire Warrior defeat Hack Meyers by pinfall with a lifting DDT.

Immediately following the third match, a brawl erupted between Vampire Warrior and Tommy Dreamer, with Vampire Warrior angry that his wife, Luna Vachon, was acting as Dreamer's valet. Dreamer won a bloody bout after DDT'ing Vampire Warrior onto a steel chair.

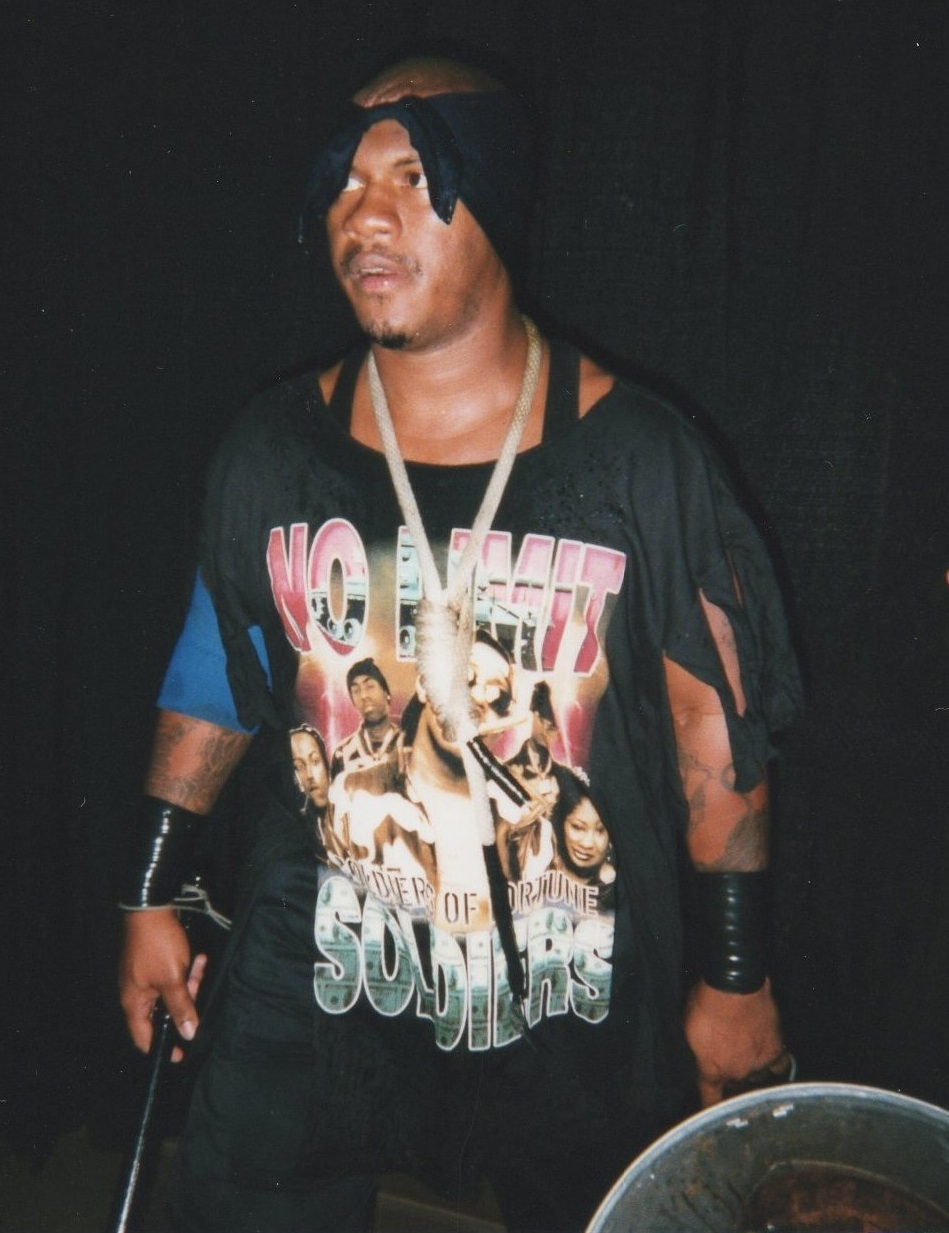
New Jack, one-half of the Gangstas, made his ECW debut at Barbed Wire, Hoodies & Chokeslams.

In the fifth match, 911 defeated the debuting "Jungle" Jim Steele in a squash that lasted less than one minute, pinning him following a chokeslam. Following the match, 911 gave Steele several more chokeslams.

The sixth match saw Beulah McGillicutty face Luna Vachon in an extension of the feud between Raven and Tommy Dreamer. In her first match for ECW, the diminutive McGillicutty pinned Vachon in a matter of seconds after Raven's henchman Stevie Richards hit Vachon with a steel chair immediately following the bell. Following the match, Raven and Richards attacked Vachon. When Dreamer - injured from his impromptu match with Vampire Warrior - intervened, Raven gave him a chair shot and a DDT and then broke his fingers. Raven then handcuffed Vachon and prepared to hit her with a steel chair, but Dreamer threw himself in front of her and absorbed the blow.

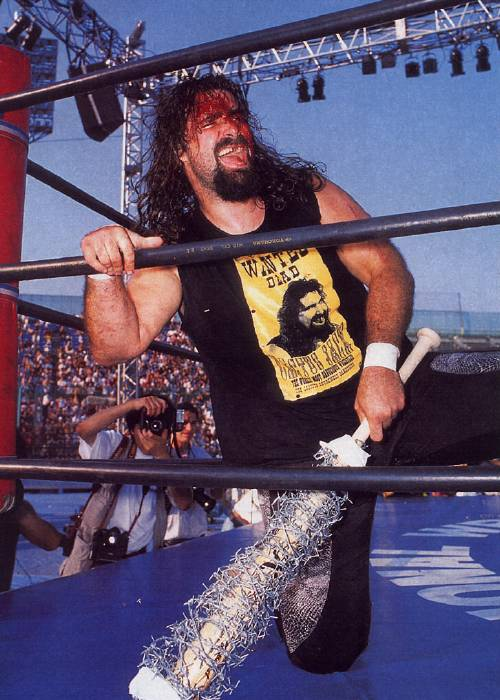
Cactus Jack challenged for the ECW World Heavyweight Championship in the main event of Barbed Wire, Hoodies & Chokeslams.

A scheduled six-man tag team match pitting Dreamer, 2 Cold Scorpio and Taz against the Pitbulls and Raven was changed to a handicap match due to Dreamer being incapacitated following the chair shot from Raven. Hack Myers attempted to substitute for Dreamer but this was disallowed by referee Bill Alfonso, who would draw the ire of the ECW audience by rigidly enforcing rules. During the match, Francine debuted as a member of the audience besotted with Stevie Richards (who had accompanied Raven to ringside); Richards' flirting led to an argument between Francine and Beulah, prompting Raven to lead Richards and Beulah backstage, leaving The Pitbulls two-on-two with 2 Cold Scorpio and Taz. The match ended when Taz delivered a super belly-to-belly suplex to Pitbull #2 and pinned him.

The penultimate match was scheduled to be the Public Enemy defending the ECW World Tag Team Championship against Axl Rotten and a tag team partner of Rotten's choosing. Rotten introduced his brother, Ian Rotten, as his partner but his selection was disallowed by referee Bill Alfonso due to the Bad Breed having lost a match in November 1994 with the stipulation that they could no longer team together if they lost. The Rotten brothers subsequently brawled with one another. With no opponents, the Public Enemy danced in the ring until the Gangstas made their debut, attacking the Public Enemy until being arrested.

The main event saw the Sandman defend his ECW World Heavyweight Championship against Cactus Jack in a barbed wire match. During the bout, Cactus Jack seemingly defeated the Sandman by technical knockout, but in a "Dusty finish", referee Bill Alfonso ordered the match to continue, ruling that the Championship could not change hands on a 10 count. The match ended when the Sandman choked Cactus Jack with a length of barbed wire and Alfonso declared that Cactus Jack could no longer continue, awarding the bout to the Sandman. Following the match, ECW commissioner Tod Gordon attempted to attack Alfonso, but was clotheslined down by Alfonso. The event ended with Cactus Jack - wrapped in barbed wire - leaving the ring to a standing ovation.

== Results ==
No.	Results	Stipulations	Times
1	The Broad Street Bully defeated the New Jersey Devil	Singles match	0:16
2	Mikey Whipwreck defeated Val Puccio	Singles match	3:11
3	Vampire Warrior defeated Hack Meyers	Singles match	2:36
4	Tommy Dreamer (with Luna Vachon) defeated Vampire Warrior	Singles match	7:18
5	911 (with Paul E. Dangerously) defeated "Jungle" Jim Steele	Singles match	0:34
6	Beulah McGillicutty (with Raven and Stevie Richards) defeated Luna Vachon	Singles match	—
7	2 Cold Scorpio and Taz (with Paul E. Dangerously) defeated the Pitbulls (Pitbull #1 and Pitbull #2) and Raven (with Beulah McGillicutty and Stevie Richards)	Three-on-two handicap match	12:50
8	The Sandman (c) (with Woman) defeated Cactus Jack by TKO	Barbed wire match for the ECW World Heavyweight Championship	—
(c) / – the champion(s) heading into the match
