= Hack Meyers =

American professional wrestler (1973–2015)

- Hack Meyers in 2005.

Personal information
- Born: Donald Haviland; December 7, 1973 Baltimore, Maryland, U.S.
- Died: December 5, 2015 (aged 41) Baltimore, Maryland, U.S.

Professional wrestling career
- Ring name(s): Admiral H. Oscar Meyers; Bronco Billy; Hack Meyers
- Billed height: 6 ft 2 in (188 cm)
- Billed weight: 225 lb (102 kg)
- Billed from: "The Last House on the Left"
- Trained by: Oscar Meyers
- Debut: October 19, 1990
- Retired: 2011

Donald Haviland (December 7, 1973 – December 5, 2015) was an American professional wrestler, better known by his ring name, Hack Meyers. He was best known for his time in Extreme Championship Wrestling from 1993 to 1996.

== Professional wrestling career ==
=== Early career (1990–1993) ===
Haviland made his wrestling debut as Bronco Billy, forming a tag team with Colt Starr known as The Texas Longhorns. He wrestled in independent promotions for the next three years before signing with Eastern Championship Wrestling.

=== Eastern Championship Wrestling / Extreme Championship Wrestling (1993–1996, 1997, 1998) ===
Meyers first appeared in ECW at a joint-promotional event between ECW and Mid-Eastern Wrestling Federation on November 14, 1993, where he defeated Trent Young. He began full-time wrestling for ECW by making his debut on the February 15, 1994 episode of Hardcore TV by losing to Mr. Hughes. He wrestled mainly on the undercard. He had several matches against ECW's biggest superstars at ECW supercards, but he was never able to defeat ECW's top talent. Haviland's gimmick in ECW was "The Shah of ECW", a fan favorite. During any exchange of blows, fans would chant "Shah!" every time he landed a punch or kick, and "Shit!" when his opponent retaliated.

In 1994, Meyers' made his first major appearance at the Ultimate Jeopardy event, where he teamed with Don E. Allen and Blue Max in a handicap match against 911, which 911 won. He wrestled Tommy Dreamer at Hostile City Showdown, but was defeated. At Heat Wave, he teamed with Rockin' Rebel in a loss to The Bad Breed (Ian and Axl Rotten). This led to a series of matches between Meyers and Rebel, culminating in a showdown at Hardcore Heaven, which Meyers won. He faced Chris Benoit in a losing effort at Holiday Hell. Meyers found some success in mid-1995, winning at back-to-back supercards. He defeated Big Malley at Hardcore Heaven and Val Puccio at Heat Wave. He lost to JT Smith at Wrestlepalooza but followed this up with an evenly split series of rematches. Meyers faced the returning Sabu in a losing effort at November to Remember in one of the longest matches on the card. He followed this up with a victory over Stevie Richards as well as supercard wins over Bruiser Mastino at December to Dismember and JT Smith at Holiday Hell 1995.

He lost to Taz at the 1996 House Party and J.T. Smith at Big Ass Extreme Bash. Meyers' final appearance in ECW for some time was a loss to 2 Cold Scorpio in a Loser Leaves Town match at November to Remember. Meyers did return briefly to ECW, teaming with Balls Mahoney and Axl Rotten in a six man tag team match versus The Dudley Boyz at Born to Be Wired on August 9, 1997. Meyers would take the pinfall, losing after receiving a 3D. His last match in ECW was on November 27, 1998 on ECW Hardcore TV where he teamed with Balls Mahoney and Masato Tanaka losing to the Dudley Boyz.

=== Late career (1997–2011) ===
After leaving ECW he remained in the wrestling industry, working for various promotions continuing using a hardcore style, including IPW, IWA Mid-South, FOW, MLW, and MCW, among others. In May 1997, Meyers worked at least two matches for World Championship Wrestling (WCW), losing to The Giant and The Barbarian. In May 1999, he appeared for one night in the WWF (World Wrestling Federation), teaming with Chris Nelson, facing The Hardy Boyz on WWF Shotgun Saturday Night. He also trained wrestlers, such as Scoot Andrews and Travis Tomko. He wrestled predominantly in the Florida independent circuit in the latter days of his career. He retired in 2011.

== Death ==
On November 15, 2015, fellow ECW alumnus Axl Rotten tweeted that Haviland would undergo brain surgery at Johns Hopkins Hospital. On December 5, 2015, Haviland died from complications of that surgery. He was two days away from his 42nd birthday.

== Championships and accomplishments ==
- Florida State Professional Wrestling Association
  - FSPWA Tag Team Championship (1 time)
- Florida Wrestling Alliance
  - FWA Heavyweight Championship (1 time)
- Freestyle Championship Wrestling
  - FSCW Heavyweight Championship (1 time)
- Future of Wrestling
  - FOW Tag Team Championship (1 time) – with Dave Johnson
- Hardkore Championship Wrestling
  - HCW Hardcore Championship (1 time)
- Independent Professional Wrestling
  - IPW Hardcore Championship (1 time)
- Pro Wrestling Illustrated
  - PWI ranked him #314 of the 500 best singles wrestlers of the PWI 500 in 1999
- Other titles
  - FWF Heavyweight Championship (1 time)

== See also ==
- List of premature professional wrestling deaths
