= Beulah McGillicutty =

American professional wrestling valet (born 1969)

Personal information
- Born: Trisa Hayes; March 14, 1969 (age 57) Muskegon, Michigan, U.S.
- Spouse: Tommy Dreamer (m. 2002)
- Children: 2

Professional wrestling career
- Ring name: Beulah McGillicutty
- Billed height: 5 ft 6 in (168 cm)
- Billed weight: 110 lb (50 kg)
- Billed from: "From the pages of Penthouse magazine" Yonkers, New York
- Debut: 1988
- Retired: 2014

Trisa Laughlin (née Hayes; born March 14, 1969) is an American author and retired professional wrestling valet, better known by her ring name, Beulah McGillicutty. She is best known for her appearances in Extreme Championship Wrestling from 1995 to 1998.

== Professional wrestling career ==
=== Stampede Wrestling (1988) ===
Hayes made a one-off appearance in Stampede Wrestling in Calgary, Alberta in 1988 as Brian Pillman's sister. She was dating Pillman at the time and they had her appear in the crowd to be harassed by the heels so that Pillman could get over as a face by standing up for her.

=== Extreme Championship Wrestling (1995–1998) ===
While working as a backup dancer for the singer Prince, Hayes met the baseball player Ron Gant, who introduced her to his friend, professional wrestler Raven. Raven in turn introduced her to Paul Heyman, the owner of Extreme Championship Wrestling (ECW), an independent professional wrestling promotion based in Philadelphia, Pennsylvania.

In 1995, Heyman introduced Hayes to ECW under the ring name "Beulah McGillicutty". She made her debut at Three Way Dance on April 8, 1995, helping Raven defeat Tommy Dreamer. At Hostile City Showdown the following day, her backstory was revealed: while Raven and Tommy Dreamer (allegedly former childhood friends) had been attending a summer camp in their teens, they had met Beulah, who was overweight. Beulah had fallen in love with Tommy Dreamer, but he rejected her, so she slept with Raven. Raven's lackey Stevie Richards brought Beulah (now a slim Penthouse model) to ECW so she could gain revenge on Dreamer by helping Raven. Beulah became Raven's valet, and suffered several piledrivers at the hands of Dreamer during the course of the feud.

At the same time, Beulah feuded with Francine and Luna Vachon, and was involved in several "catfights" with each of them. Her first match was on June 17, 1995, at Barbed Wire, Hoodies & Chokeslams, when she pinned Luna after Richards hit her with a chair. At House Party on January 7, 1996, she claimed that she was pregnant and told a shocked Raven that it was Dreamer's baby, intensifying their feud. On the January 16, 1996 episode of ECW Hardcore TV, Beulah left Raven and aligned herself with Dreamer. However, at Hostile City Showdown 1996, Shane Douglas informed Dreamer that Beulah was never pregnant, and also had been cheating on him. When Dreamer demanded to know who with (suspecting Douglas), Raven's new valet Kimona Wanalaya proclaimed that it was her, and she proceeded to kiss Beulah to the mat. After some hesitation, Dreamer kissed both women, proclaiming "I'll take em both, I'm hardcore!"

In 1997, Beulah and Dreamer teamed up for a few intergender tag team matches against Francine and Douglas, with Beulah surprising fans by performing moonsaults in the matches. In September 1997 at As Good as It Gets, she defeated Bill Alfonso in what Paul Heyman said was one of the most brutal matches in ECW history, due to the amount of blood lost by Alfonso.

When the ECW wrestlers invaded the World Wrestling Federation, appearing on an episode of Raw, Beulah was at Dreamer's side.

In 1998, Beulah was attacked by Justin Credible and was put out of action. She returned to help Dreamer feud with Credible and his entourage. A few months later, Hayes grew tired of wrestling and Beulah was written out of storylines via The Dudley Boyz breaking her neck with their Dudley Death Drop maneuver.

=== Sporadic appearances (2005–2014) ===
Beulah returned to the ring on June 12, 2005, at the World Wrestling Entertainment-produced ECW One Night Stand pay-per-view. She interfered in the main event, helping Tommy Dreamer and The Sandman, but their opponents, The Dudley Boyz, won despite her efforts. Beulah was involved in a catfight with Francine, who had just kicked Dreamer in the crotch.

On August 8, 2010, Hayes appeared at Total Nonstop Action Wrestling's ECW reunion show, Hardcore Justice, first shown sitting in the front row with her two daughters, before later getting involved in Dreamer's match with Raven by giving Raven a low blow.

In 2014 Hayes officially retired after accompanying her husband to the ring one final time at his House of Hardcore 7 Pay Per View. During Dreamer's match, Hayes got into a brief cat fight with TNA Knockout Velvet Sky. After the match Hayes thanked all of the fans in attendance and those watching for their love and support over the years.

=== World Wrestling Entertainment (2006, 2009) ===
On June 7, 2006, it was announced that Beulah would be in the corner of Dreamer and Terry Funk against then-heels, Mick Foley and Edge as an equalizer to the heel gimmick of Lita. On the day of the pay-per-view, the tag match was later changed to a six-person mixed tag match pitting Edge, Foley, and Lita against Dreamer, Funk, and herself. Wrestling barefoot, Beulah handled Lita and appeared on the bottom of a catfight. Dreamer, Funk, and Beulah would lose the match when Edge speared and pinned Beulah with a cover that resembled the "legs up" version of the missionary position.

Beulah appeared on the December 29, 2009 edition of ECW on SyFy. She and her twin daughters were sitting in the front row during Tommy Dreamer's last match in World Wrestling Entertainment.

== Writing career ==
In 2012, Laughlin published Gertrude the Great, a children's book illustrated by Jill Thompson.

== Personal life ==
After retiring from wrestling in 1998, Hayes returned to college. On October 12, 2002, at the Lake Isle Country Club in Eastchester, New York, Hayes married Thomas Laughlin, known as ECW wrestler Tommy Dreamer, with whom she later had twin girls, Brianna Laughlin and Kimberly Laughlin. The twins appeared in the season six episode of The Sopranos called "The Ride" as Domenica Baccalieri, Tony Soprano's baby niece.

== Bibliography ==
- Gertrude the Great (2012)
