= Francine (wrestling) =

American professional wrestling valet (born 1972)

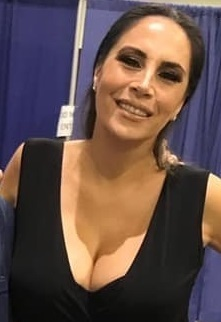
- Francine in 2022

Personal information
- Born: Francine Fournier; February 19, 1972 (age 54) Philadelphia, Pennsylvania, U.S.
- Spouse: Joseph Meeks (m. 2008)
- Children: 2

Professional wrestling career
- Ring name(s): Francine; Miss Montgomeryville
- Billed height: 5 ft 7 in (170 cm)
- Billed weight: 126 lb (57 kg)
- Billed from: Dover, Delaware, U.S. Montgomeryville, Pennsylvania, U.S. Philadelphia, Pennsylvania, U.S.
- Trained by: J.T. Smith
- Debut: 1994
- Retired: 2006

Francine Meeks (née Fournier; born February 19, 1972), known by the mononym Francine, is an American professional wrestling valet and professional wrestler. She is best known for her appearances with Extreme Championship Wrestling from 1995 to 2001 and with World Wrestling Entertainment in 2005 and 2006. During her tenure with ECW, Francine managed several of the promotion's top wrestlers.

== Early life ==
Francine was born on February 19, 1972. She grew up in Philadelphia, Pennsylvania, where she attended West Catholic Preparatory High School in West Philadelphia. She became a fan of professional wrestling as a teenager, attending events at the Spectrum.

While working for a life insurance company in 1993, Francine saw a television commercial for the "House of Hardcore", the professional wrestling school run by Extreme Championship Wrestling, on SportsChannel Philadelphia and decided to enroll as she "didn't want to be stuck behind a desk".

== Professional wrestling career ==
=== Extreme Championship Wrestling (1994–2001) ===
Francine trained with J. T. Smith at House of Hardcore. During her training she made a handful of appearances on the independent circuit. After seven months, she began appearing on ECW house shows. Francine made her first ECW in-ring appearance in 1994 under the name "Miss Montgomeryville", portraying a beauty pageant winner who acted as a guest timekeeper until being chokeslammed by 911. Early into her ECW career, Francine was approached by the World Wrestling Federation about joining the promotion as "Sister Love", a valet for Brother Love.

In summer 1995, Francine debuted in ECW at Barbed Wire, Hoodies & Chokeslams as a devoted fan of Stevie Richards and later became his manager and on-screen girlfriend. The new partnership angered both Richards's tag team partner Raven and Raven's valet Beulah McGillicutty. This rivalry led to several catfights between the women. These culminated in a match between the two women in August 1995 with Stevie Richards as the special guest referee; the match ended when Richards turned on Francine due to the influence of Raven, with Beulah winning the match.

Francine then allied herself with The Pitbulls tag team, who had left Raven's Nest, adopting a leather-clad dominatrix persona to fit with the Pitbulls' gimmick. She led The Pitbulls to a victory over Richards and Raven for the ECW Tag Team Championships on September 16, 1995. At Cyberslam '96 in February 1996, Francine and the Pitbulls defeated The Eliminators and Richards in a triple dog collar match; despite being superkicked by Richards at the outset of the match, Francine ultimately won the match for her team and gained her revenge by pinning Richards after he was superbombed by The Pitbulls. She went on to lead Pitbull #2 to win the ECW Television Championship from Shane Douglas at Fight the Power in June 1996 after Douglas insulted her and gave her a belly-to-belly suplex.

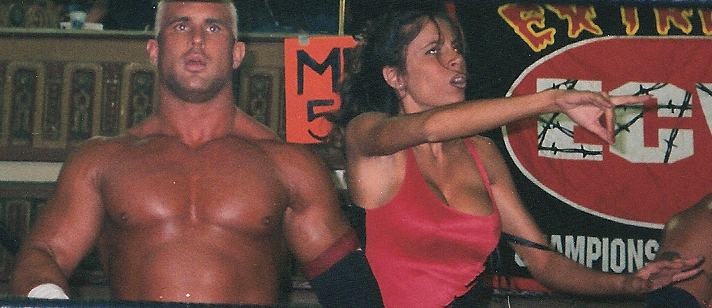
Francine (right) with Chris Candido in Extreme Championship Wrestling in 1998

On July 13, 1996, at Heat Wave, Francine turned on The Pitbulls and became the manager of Shane Douglas. The Pitbulls gained their revenge by superbombing her through a table. At Holiday Hell '96 in December 1996, Francine and Douglas defeated Tommy Dreamer and Beulah McGillicutty in a mixed tag team match; the two teams faced one another repeatedly until mid-1997. Francine managed Douglas from 1996 until his departure from the promotion in 1999. Referred to as his "Head" Cheerleader, she twice helped him become ECW World Heavyweight Champion. During this time, she could also occasionally be found at ringside in support of Douglas' Triple Threat teammates Chris Candido and Bam Bam Bigelow. Bigelow, however, legitimately broke her pelvic bone while performing a press slam on her. In November 1997, she was by Douglas' side when he defeated Bigelow for the World Championship. She remained Douglas's manager until he left ECW in 1999.

In 1999, Francine began managing Tommy Dreamer. In mid-1999, Francine feuded with Steve Corino, whom she defeated in multiple singles matches. Her partnership with Dreamer lasted until March 2000, when she left Dreamer after he accidentally DDT'd her while temporarily blinded, aligning herself with Raven.

On April 22, 2000, at CyberSlam, Dreamer defeated Taz to win the ECW World Heavyweight Championship. Following the match, Francine and Raven came to ringside to congratulate him. As Dreamer celebrated with Raven, Justin Credible and Jason attacked them, resulting in an impromptu championship bout between Dreamer and Credible. The match ended when Francine aligned herself with Credible by low blowing Dreamer, enabling Credible to pin him for the ECW World Heavyweight Championship. Francine went on to manage Credible until ECW closed in April 2001.

=== NWA Total Nonstop Action (2002) ===
On June 26, 2002, Francine participated in the NWA Total Nonstop Action (NWA TNA) lingerie battle royal for the Miss TNA Crown. On TNA's debut weekly PPV, Francine and Elektra had an in-ring argument, leading Elektra to name Francine the reason for ECW's bankruptcy. In the match, Francine was eliminated by Elektra, Shannon and Miss Joni. She was upset that she lost, and that Ed Ferrara touched her breast, so she began to whip Ferrara with his own belt. Francine then got back in the ring and started to whip Taylor Vaughn with Ferrara's belt after she won the match.

The next week the two women had a match against each other. Francine took a leather strap out of her boot and started to whip and choke Taylor with it. Referee Scott Armstrong grabbed it and took it away but Taylor grabbed it from him and proceeded to whip and choke Francine with it. Armstrong tried to stop her, but Taylor hit him too, causing her to be disqualified. Commentator Ed Ferrara got into the ring to help Francine, telling her she was the winner. Francine then put Ferrara's hand on her breast and slapped him for touching it, then whipped him with the leather strap.

Two weeks later Francine attacked Jasmine St. Claire while she was being interviewed by Goldy Locks. The two had a match later that night which resulted in both women being stripped to their underwear. It ended in a disqualification after interference by The Blue Meanie and Francine was taken away on a stretcher.

=== Independent circuit (2002–2006) ===
She made appearances with Major League Wrestling in 2003 as Michael Shane's manager and was later involved with the Women's Extreme Wrestling and Hottest Ladies of Wrestling promotions. In 2003, she also appeared in Delaware Championship Wrestling, where she feuded with Talia Madison and Noel Harlow. In 2004 Delaware Championship Wrestling changed its name to Dynamite Championship Wrestling.

On June 10, 2005, Francine appeared at the ECW reunion show Hardcore Homecoming, where she acted as the valet of Shane Douglas.

=== World Wrestling Entertainment (2005, 2006) ===
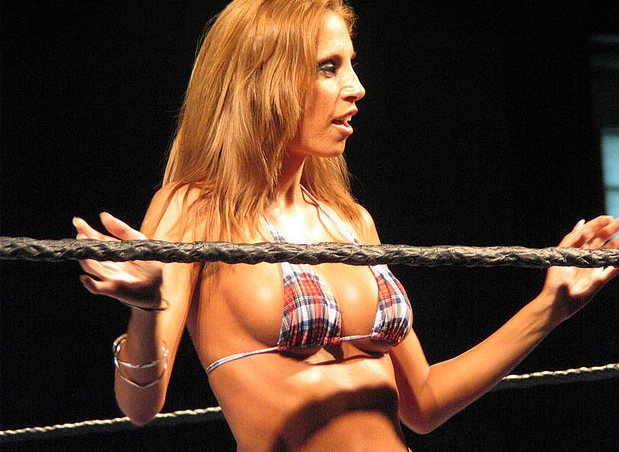
Francine in World Wrestling Entertainment in 2006

On June 12, she appeared at World Wrestling Entertainment (WWE) produced ECW One Night Stand reunion pay-per-view, interfering in the main event of Tommy Dreamer and The Sandman versus The Dudley Boyz. After she kicked Dreamer in the crotch, Francine was attacked by Dreamer's wife and former valet, Beulah McGillicutty. On June 19, Francine apologized to her fans via her website for not disclosing that she was going to appear at One Night Stand, stating that the WWE had asked her to keep her appearance a surprise.

Francine then signed a contract to appear on the newly created Extreme Championship Wrestling brand. She made her first appearances with the promotion in house shows, normally competing in bikini contests with Kelly Kelly. Francine began acting as the valet of fellow "ECW Original" Balls Mahoney in his feud with Kevin Thorn to even the odds against him and Ariel, Thorn's valet. Francine made her return to television on the September 19, 2006, episode of ECW on Sci Fi. On the following week's show, she made her in-ring debut as she wrestled Ariel to a no-contest in an "Extreme Catfight". Seen the booking she had, Francine asked for her release, pointing that she was signed only to perform in bikini contests. She was released from her WWE contract on October 12, 2006.

=== Semi-retirement (2006–present) ===
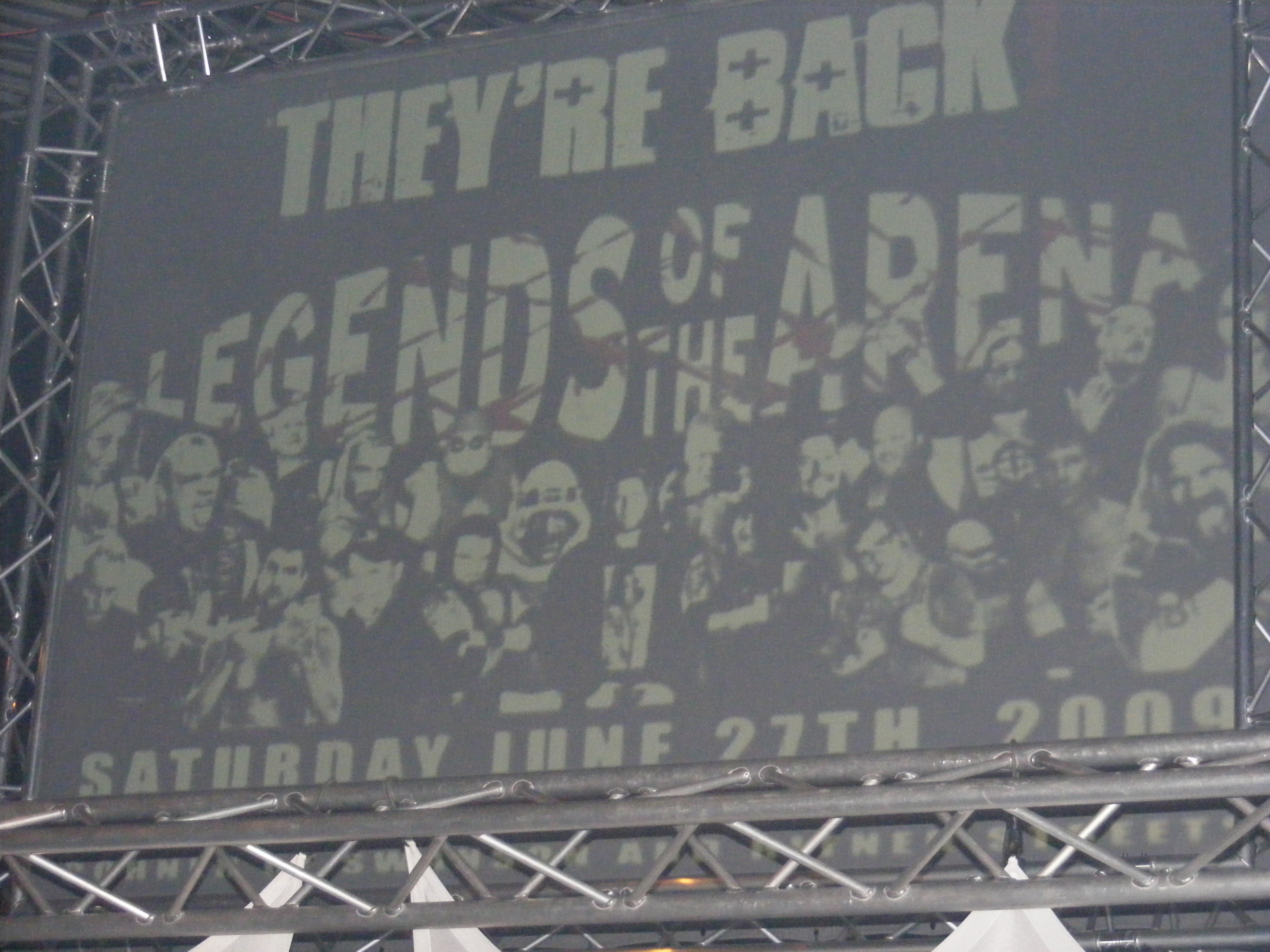
Advertisement for Francine's "Legends of the Arena" reunion show

Following her release from WWE, Francine announced her imminent retirement from professional wrestling on November 9, 2006.

She also made appearances with Women's Extreme Wrestling (WEW) and made frequent appearances at autograph signings. In WEW, she managed Amber O'Neal.

On June 27, 2009, Francine held an ECW reunion show titled "Legends of the Arena" at the former ECW Arena, with proceeds from the event being donated to the American Cancer Society.

On August 8, 2010, Francine appeared via pre-taped video at Total Nonstop Action Wrestling's ECW reunion show, Hardcore Justice.

On July 28, 2021, Francine appeared in a backstage segment in Impact Wrestling via a video call with Brian Myers.

In October 2024, Francine announced that she would be participating in NXT 2300 on November 6, 2024.

== Other media ==
Francine appeared as a playable character in the videogames ECW Hardcore Revolution and ECW Anarchy Rulz.
