= Bill Alfonso =

Professional wrestling referee and manager

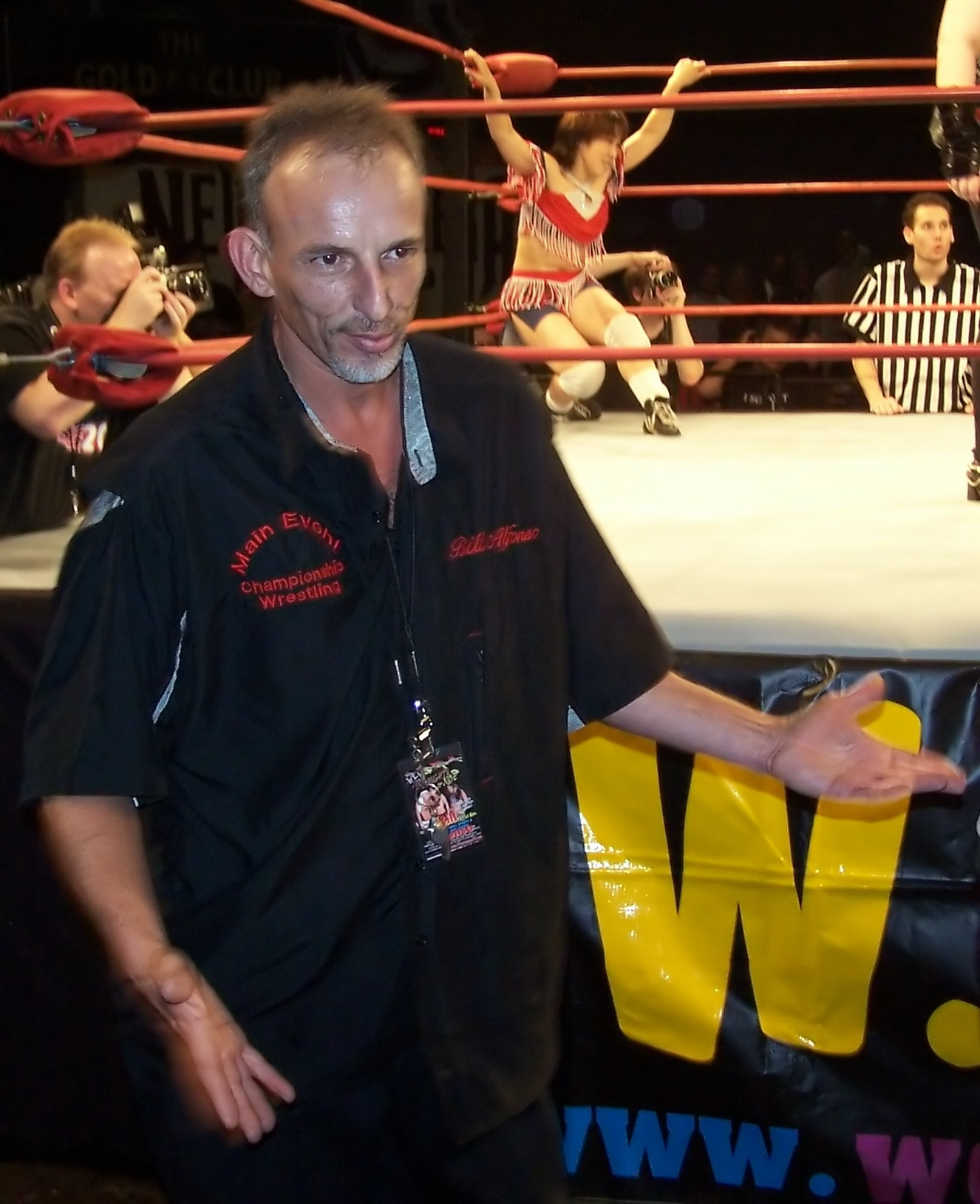

Personal information
- Born: William Matthew Sierra; August 11, 1957 (age 69) Portsmouth, New Hampshire, U.S.

Professional wrestling career
- Ring name: Bill Alfonso
- Billed height: 5 ft 10 in (1.78 m)
- Billed weight: 161 lb (73 kg)
- Trained by: Extreme Championship Wrestling
- Debut: 1979
- Retired: 2025

William Matthew Sierra (born August 11, 1957), better known by his ring name Bill Alfonso, is an American former professional wrestling referee and manager, currently performing for Major League Wrestling (MLW), where he serves as the manager of Matthew Justice. He achieved his greatest success in Extreme Championship Wrestling in the mid-to-late 1990s. He is well known for the whistle that was almost always hanging around his neck, which he blew constantly during his wrestlers' matches.

== Career ==
=== Early career, World Championship Wrestling and World Wrestling Federation (1979–1995) ===
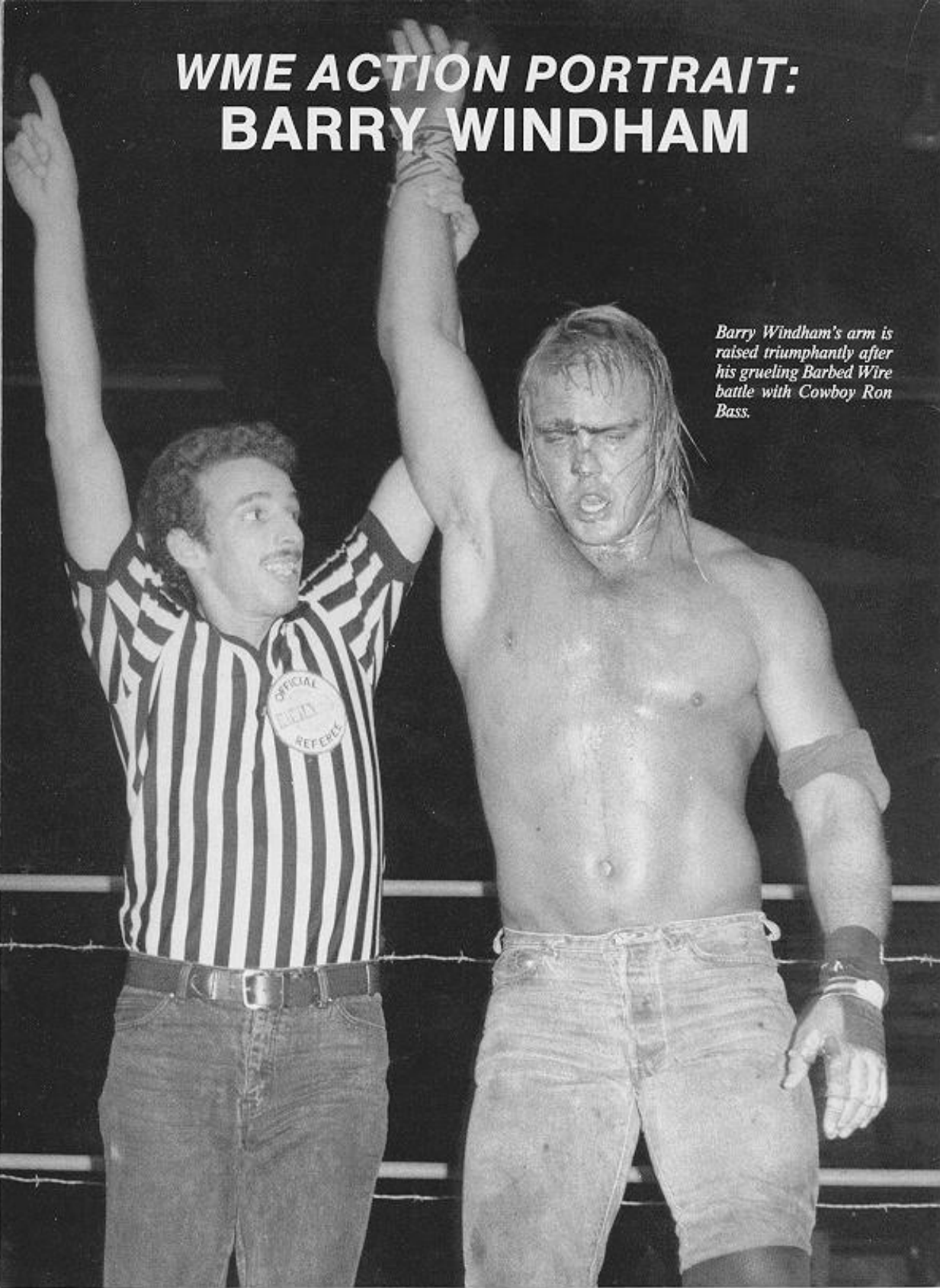
Bill Alfonso and Barry Windham in 1987

Alfonso refereed his first match in Texas at the age of 21. He was the official in a chain match between The Sheik and Terry Funk. Shortly thereafter, he took on a regular role as a referee in Championship Wrestling from Florida. He is seen on footage from 1983 as an "NWA official" sitting in the conference room as the main event of the first Starrcade between Harley Race and Ric Flair is being announced by Bob Geigel. He then worked in every major American promotion, including World Championship Wrestling and the World Wrestling Federation, where he was a referee for The Undertaker and Giant Gonzalez (who Alfonso was an agent for) match at WrestleMania IX.

=== Extreme Championship Wrestling (1995–2001) ===
Alfonso made his debut in Extreme Championship Wrestling In May 1995 at Enter the Sandman as a "troubleshooting referee". Introduced by Shane Douglas, he angered many ECW fans with strict enforcement of the rules and disqualifications of wrestlers for such ECW traditions as using steel chairs as weapons. In this role, he engaged in a feud with ECW founder Tod Gordon that resulted in several wrestling matches.

Alfonso was then stripped of his refereeing duties and took on the role of Taz's manager and helped him on a winning streak that lasted over a year. In the midst of Taz's feud with Sabu, however, Alfonso turned on his charge and aligned with Sabu. In this role, he performed more than the usual duties, as he actually managed Sabu's finances. Rob Van Dam later took on Alfonso as a manager and formed a tag team with Sabu. Alfonso also led Van Dam to the longest ECW World Television Championship reign in the history of ECW. In September 1997 at As Good as It Gets, Alfonso fought Beulah McGillicutty with this match becoming infamous because Alfonso lost 1/3 of the blood in his body according to Paul Heyman.

=== Return to WWE (2005–2006) ===
Alfonso returned to the WWE (the former WWF) and was at the 2005 ECW One-Night Stand managing Sabu and standing in the ring with RVD while RVD delivered a shoot style promo. Alfonso returned at ECW One-Night Stand 2006 after Rob Van Dam won the WWE Championship, as he celebrated with him and the rest of the then-ECW Roster.

=== Total Nonstop Action Wrestling (2010) ===
On August 8, 2010, Alfonso took part in Total Nonstop Action Wrestling's ECW reunion show, Hardcore Justice, managing both Rob Van Dam and Sabu during their match against each other. On the following edition of TNA Impact!, the ECW alumni, known collectively as Extreme, Version 2.0 (EV 2.0), were assaulted by A.J. Styles, Kazarian, Robert Roode, James Storm, Douglas Williams and Matt Morgan of Ric Flair's Fourtune stable, who thought they didn't deserve to be in TNA.

=== Independent promotions (2001–present) ===
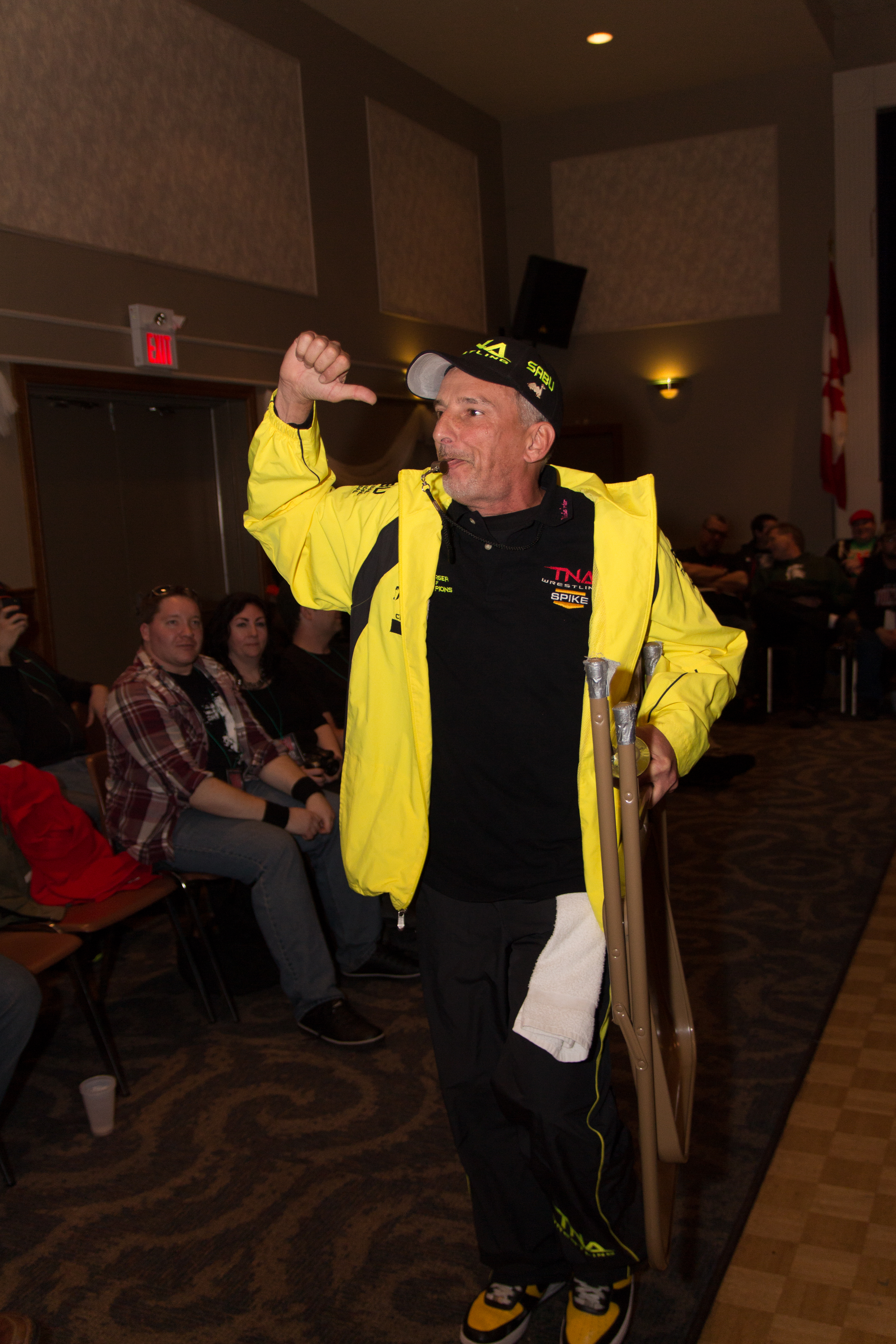
Bill Alfonso making his entrance at a show in March 2013

Since the closing of ECW, Alfonso has appeared in several independent promotions. He worked one match in Xtreme Pro Wrestling as a referee. He has also worked in Elite Wrestling Entertainment as a referee and a manager, as well as managing wrestlers in Squared Circle Wrestling and Pro Wrestling Unplugged. In May 2007, he made his first appearance with Women's Extreme Wrestling, where he serves as a manager and as commissioner.

On December 18, 2021, Alfonso wrestled against Ziggy Haim in an intergender match for Absolute Intense Wrestling in Cleveland, Ohio, in which Haim won.

He lost to former ECW foe Tod Gordon at Battleground Championship Wrestling in Philadelphia on December 17, 2022.

On April 5, 2024, Alfonso defeated Joel Gertner at Battleground Championship Wrestling in Philadelphia.

== Other media ==
In October 2002, fellow manager Missy Hyatt sued Alfonso in a case televised on Judge Mathis. She accused Alfonso of damaging her Porsche and was awarded $500. Alfonso also had other run-ins with the law, being arrested for a stolen rental vehicle in Georgia, DUI and possession of cocaine in Tampa, violation of probation and testing positive for heroin. Alfonso served jail time in Tampa for the vop charges. He also found himself in trouble with the Tampa police for other charges throughout the early 2000's contributed from a heroin addiction.

== Awards and accomplishments ==
- Cauliflower Alley Club
  - Charlie Smith Referee Award (2024)
- Pro Wrestling Illustrated
  - PWI Manager of the Year (1997)
