= List of Extreme Championship Wrestling attendance records =

Viking Hall, long considered ECW's home arena, set a number of attendance records between 1994 and 1997.

The following is a list of Extreme Championship Wrestling attendance records. Established in 1992 by Tod Gordon as Eastern Championship Wrestling, the promotion was part of the National Wrestling Alliance for nearly a year before breaking away from the organization in August 1994. The split occurred under controversial circumstances when Shane Douglas infamously threw down the NWA World Heavyweight Championship moments after winning the title in a championship tournament. The promotion was subsequently rechristened "Extreme" Championship Wrestling and, under the creative direction of booker Paul Heyman, saw its most successful period during the 1990s wrestling boom. By the end of the decade, ECW had successfully transitioned from a Northeastern U.S.-based independent promotion to a nationally touring company and was widely considered part of the 1990s-version of the "Big Three" with World Championship Wrestling and the World Wrestling Federation.

== Events and attendances ==
Promotion	Event	Location	Venue	Attendance	Main Event(s)
ECW	Anarchy Rulz; September 19, 1999	Villa Park, Illinois	Odeum Sports & Expo Center	6,000	Rob Van Dam (c) vs. Balls Mahoney for the ECW World Television Championship
ECW	November to Remember; November 1, 1998	New Orleans, Louisiana	Lakefront Arena	5,800	Taz, Sabu & Rob Van Dam vs. The Triple Threat (Shane Douglas, Bam Bam Bigelow and Chris Candido)
ECW	Heat Wave; July 16, 2000	Los Angeles, California	Grand Olympic Auditorium	5,700	Justin Credible (c) vs. Tommy Dreamer in a Stairway to Hell match for the ECW World Heavyweight Championship
ECW	ECW on TNN; September 9, 2000	Mississauga, Ontario	Hershey Centre	5,000	Justin Credible (c) vs. Jerry Lynn and Steve Corino in a 3-Way Dance match for the ECW World Heavyweight Championship
ECW	Guilty as Charged; January 9, 2000	Birmingham, Alabama	Boutwell Memorial Auditorium	4,700	Mike Awesome (c) vs. Spike Dudley for the ECW World Heavyweight Championship
ECW	November to Remember; November 30, 1997	Monaca, Pennsylvania	Golden Dome	4,634	Bam Bam Bigelow (c) vs. Shane Douglas for the ECW World Heavyweight Championship
ECW	Anarchy Rulz; October 1, 2000	St. Paul, Minnesota	Roy Wilkins Auditorium	4,600	Justin Credible (c) vs. Jerry Lynn for the ECW World Heavyweight Championship
ECW	November to Remember; November 5, 2000	Villa Park, Illinois	Odeum Sports & Expo Center	4,600	Jerry Lynn (c) vs. Justin Credible, Steve Corino and The Sandman in a "Double Jeopardy" match for the ECW World Heavyweight Championship
ECW	Heat Wave; August 2, 1998	Trotwood, Ohio	Hara Arena	4,376	Tommy Dreamer, The Sandman & Spike Dudley vs. The Dudley Boys (Buh Buh Ray Dudley, D-Von Dudley & Big Dick Dudley) in the Street Fight match
ECW	ECW on TNN; September 11, 1999	Buffalo, New York	Flickinger Center	3,960	Rob Van Dam (c) vs. Uganda for the ECW World Television Championship
ECW	ECW on TNN; November 18, 1999	Chicago, Illinois	Aragon Ballroom	3,912	Mike Awesome (c) vs. Spike Dudley for the ECW World Heavyweight Championship

== Historical ==
Top 10 most-attended shows in 1992
No.	Promotion	Event	Location	Venue	Attendance	Main Event(s)
1.	ECW	Jimmy Snuka vs. Davey Boy Smith; December 19, 1992	Morrisville, Pennsylvania	Morrisville High School	610	Jimmy Snuka vs. Davey Boy Smith
2.	ECW	Jimmy Snuka vs. Ivan Koloff; October 2, 1992	Philadelphia, Pennsylvania	Kinsington Ramblers Youth Association	550	Jimmy Snuka vs. Ivan Koloff
3.	ECW	Terror at Tabor; April 25, 1992	Philadelphia, Pennsylvania	Tabor Community Center	425	Jimmy Snuka vs. Salvatore Bellomo in the inaugural ECW Heavyweight Championship tournament final
4.	ECW	Don Muraco vs. Jimmy Snuka; October 3, 1992	Philadelphia, Pennsylvania	Tabor Community Center	375	Don Muraco (c) vs. Jimmy Snuka for the ECW Heavyweight Championship
5.	ECW	Jimmy Snuka vs. Johnny Hotbody; April 26, 1992	Philadelphia, Pennsylvania	Original Sports Bar	320	Jimmy Snuka (c) vs. Johnny Hotbody for the ECW Heavyweight Championship
6.	ECW	Johnny Hotbody (c) vs. Jimmy Snuka; July 14, 1992	Philadelphia, Pennsylvania	Original Sports Bar	275	Johnny Hotbody (c) vs. Jimmy Snuka for the ECW Heavyweight Championship
7.	ECW	Don Muraco vs. Jimmy Snuka; October 24, 1992	Philadelphia, Pennsylvania	Chestnut Cabaret	225	Don Muraco (c) vs. Jimmy Snuka for the ECW Heavyweight Championship
8.	ECW	Jimmy Snuka vs. Don Muraco; September 30, 1992	Philadelphia, Pennsylvania	Chestnut Cabaret	220	Jimmy Snuka (c) vs. Don Muraco for the ECW Heavyweight Championship
9.	ECW	Johnny Hotbody vs. Jimmy Janetty; May 25, 1992	Philadelphia, Pennsylvania	Original Sports Bar	200	Johnny Hotbody (c) vs. Jimmy Janetty for the ECW Heavyweight Championship
10.	ECW	Jimmy Snuka vs. Super Destroyer #1; August 12, 1992	Philadelphia, Pennsylvania	Chestnut Cabaret	200	Jimmy Snuka (c) vs. Super Destroyer #1 for the ECW Heavyweight Championship

Top 10 most-attended shows in 1993
No.	Promotion	Event	Location	Venue	Attendance	Main Event(s)
1.	NWA-ECW	November to Remember; November 13, 1993	Philadelphia, Pennsylvania	ECW Arena	1,492	Sabu (c-HW) & Road Warrior Hawk vs. Terry Funk (c-TV) & King Kong Bundy (mystery partner) in a "Winner Takes All" match for the ECW Heavyweight and ECW Television Championships
2.	NWA-ECW	UltraClash; September 18, 1993	Philadelphia, Pennsylvania	ECW Arena	1,131	Shane Douglas (c) vs. The Sandman for the ECW Heavyweight Championship
3.	NWA-ECW	Holiday Hell; December 26, 1993	Philadelphia, Pennsylvania	ECW Arena	800	Sabu (c) vs. Terry Funk for the ECW Heavyweight Championship
4.	ECW	ECW vs. WWA: Battle of the Belts; January 23, 1993	Philadelphia, Pennsylvania	Radisson Hotel	670	The Sandman (c-ECW) vs. Spider (c-WWA) for the ECW Heavyweight & WWA Heavyweight "Champion vs. Champion" match
5.	ECW	Super Summer Sizzler; June 19, 1993	Philadelphia, Pennsylvania	ECW Arena	650	Eddie Gilbert vs. Terry Funk in a Texas Chainsaw Massacre match
6.	NWA-ECW	ECW/MEWF/ASWA Supercard; November 14, 1993	Essex, Maryland	Kenwood High School	625	Jake Roberts vs. Mr. Hughes
7.	NWA-ECW	ECW Hardcore TV; December 4, 1993	Philadelphia, Pennsylvania	ECW Arena	600	Tommy Dreamer and Shane Douglas (c) vs. Kevin Sullivan and The Tazmaniac for the ECW Tag Team Championship
8.	NWA-ECW	NWA Bloodfest: Part 2 October 2, 1993	Philadelphia, Pennsylvania	ECW Arena	400	Public Enemy (Johnny Grunge and Rocco Rock) vs. Bad Breed (Axl Rotten and Ian Rotten) vs. Badd Company (Paul Diamond and Pat Tanaka) in a Steel Cage match
9.	ECW	ECW Hardcore TV; August 7, 1993	Philadelphia, Pennsylvania	ECW Arena	389	Tournament for the inaugural ECW Tag Team Championship
10.	ECW	ECW Hardcore TV; May 14, 1993	Philadelphia, Pennsylvania	ECW Arena	300	Don Muraco (c) vs. Mr. Sandman for the ECW Heavyweight Championship
10.	ECW	ECW Hardcore TV; May 15, 1993	Philadelphia, Pennsylvania	ECW Arena	300	Jimmy Snuka (c) vs. Terry Funk for the ECW Television Championship
10.	ECW	ECW Hardcore TV; August 8, 1993	Philadelphia, Pennsylvania	ECW Arena	300	Don Muraco (c) vs. Tito Santana for the ECW Heavyweight Championship

Top 10 most-attended shows in 1994
No.	Promotion	Event	Location	Venue	Attendance	Main Event(s)
1.	NWA-ECW	When Worlds Collide; May 14, 1994	Philadelphia, Pennsylvania	ECW Arena	1,558	Sabu & Bobby Eaton vs. Terry Funk & Arn Anderson
2.	NWA-ECW	ECW Hardcore TV; March 5, 1994	Philadelphia, Pennsylvania	ECW Arena	1,400	Terry Funk (c) vs. Shane Douglas in a Taped Fist match for the ECW Heavyweight Championship
3.	NWA-ECW	Hostile City Showdown; June 24, 1994	Philadelphia, Pennsylvania	ECW Arena	1,390	Sabu vs. Cactus Jack
4.	NWA-ECW	The Night the Line Was Crossed; February 5, 1994	Philadelphia, Pennsylvania	ECW Arena	1,300	Terry Funk (c) vs. Sabu vs. Shane Douglas in a 3-Way Dance match for the ECW Heavyweight Championship
5.	ECW	ECW Hardcore TV; November 19, 1994	Philadelphia, Pennsylvania	ECW Arena	1,100	Ron Simmons and 2 Cold Scorpio vs. Shane Douglas and Brian Pillman
6.	NWA-ECW	ECW Hardcore TV; April 16, 1994	Philadelphia, Pennsylvania	ECW Arena	1,050	Shane Douglas (c) vs. Road Warrior Hawk for the ECW Heavyweight Championship
6.	ECW	November to Remember; November 5, 1994	Philadelphia, Pennsylvania	ECW Arena	1,050	Shane Douglas (c) vs. Ron Simmons for the ECW World Heavyweight Championship
7.	NWA-ECW	Hardcore Heaven; August 13, 1994	Philadelphia, Pennsylvania	ECW Arena	975	Terry Funk vs. Cactus Jack
8.	NWA-ECW	Heat Wave; July 16, 1994	Philadelphia, Pennsylvania	ECW Arena	850	Public Enemy (Johnny Grunge and Rocco Rock) (c) vs. The Funk Brothers (Terry Funk and Dory Funk Jr.) in a Barbed Wire match for the ECW Tag Team Championship
8.	ECW	ECW Hardcore TV; October 1, 1994	Philadelphia, Pennsylvania	ECW Arena	850	Cactus Jack and Mikey Whipwreck (c) vs. Public Enemy (Johnny Grunge and Rocco Rock) for the ECW Tag Team Championship
9.	ECW	Holiday Hell; December 17, 1994	Philadelphia, Pennsylvania	ECW Arena	800	Public Enemy (Johnny Grunge and Rocco Rock) (c) vs. Sabu and The Tazmaniac in a No Disqualification match for the ECW Tag Team Championship
10.	NWA-ECW	Ultimate Jeopardy; March 26, 1994	Devon, Pennsylvania	Valley Forge Music Fair	700	Terry Funk (c), Road Warrior Hawk, Kevin Sullivan and The Tazmaniac vs. Shane Douglas, Mr. Hughes and Public Enemy (Johnny Grunge and Rocco Rock) in a War Games match for the ECW Heavyweight Championship

Top 10 most-attended shows in 1995
No.	Promotion	Event	Location	Venue	Attendance	Main Event(s)
1.	ECW	ECW Hardcore TV; July 28, 1995	Middletown, New York	Orange County Fairgrounds	1,400	The Sandman (c) vs. Cactus Jack for the ECW World Heavyweight Championship
2.	ECW	Holiday Hell; December 29, 1995	New York City, New York	Lost Battalion Hall	1,283	Sabu vs. Cactus Jack in an "Olympic Rules" match
3.	ECW	Gangstas Paradise; September 16, 1995	Philadelphia, Pennsylvania	ECW Arena	1,175	Mikey Whipwreck and Public Enemy (Johnny Grunge and Rocco Rock) vs. The Sandman, New Jack and 2 Cold Scorpio in a "Gangstas Paradise" Steel Cage match
4.	ECW	Return of the Funker; February 25, 1995	Philadelphia, Pennsylvania	ECW Arena	1,150	Cactus Jack vs. D. C. Drake (mystery opponent)
4.	ECW	Three Way Dance; April 8, 1995	Philadelphia, Pennsylvania	ECW Arena	1,150	Triple Threat (Chris Benoit & Dean Malenko) (c) vs. Public Enemy (Johnny Grunge & Rocco Rock) vs. The Tazmaniac & Rick Steiner in a 3-Way Dance match for the ECW Tag Team Championship
4.	ECW	Barbed Wire, Hoodies & Chokeslams; June 17, 1995	Philadelphia, Pennsylvania	ECW Arena	1,150	The Sandman (c) vs. Cactus Jack in a Barbed Wire match for the ECW World Heavyweight Championship
4.	ECW	Wrestlepalooza; August 5, 1995	Philadelphia, Pennsylvania	ECW Arena	1,150	The Gangstas (New Jack & Mustafa Saed) vs. Public Enemy (Johnny Grunge & Rocco Rock) in a Stretcher match
4.	ECW	ECW Hardcore TV; August 26, 1995	Philadelphia, Pennsylvania	ECW Arena	1,150	2 Cold Scorpio & Chris Benoit vs. The Steiner Brothers (Rick Steiner & Scott Steiner)
4.	ECW	ECW Hardcore TV; October 7, 1995	Philadelphia, Pennsylvania	ECW Arena	1,150	The Sandman (c) vs. Mikey Whipwreck for the ECW World Heavyweight Championship
4.	ECW	ECW Hardcore TV; October 28, 1995	Philadelphia, Pennsylvania	ECW Arena	1,150	Tommy Dreamer vs. Cactus Jack
4.	ECW	November to Remember; November 18, 1995	Philadelphia, Pennsylvania	ECW Arena	1,150	Tommy Dreamer & Terry Funk vs. Raven's Nest (Raven & Cactus Jack)
5.	ECW	Extreme Warfare; March 18, 1995	Philadelphia, Pennsylvania	ECW Arena	1,100	Terry Funk & The Sandman vs. Cactus Jack & Shane Douglas
5.	ECW	ECW Hardcore TV; July 20, 1995	Fort Lauderdale, Florida	War Memorial Auditorium	1,100	The Sandman vs. Cactus Jack in a Barbed Wire match
6.	ECW	Hardcore Heaven; July 1, 1995	Philadelphia, Pennsylvania	ECW Arena	1,075	The Sandman (c) vs. Cactus Jack for the ECW World Heavyweight Championship
7.	ECW	ECW Hardcore TV; May 5, 1995	Fort Lauderdale, Florida	War Memorial Auditorium	1,009	The Sandman vs. Cactus Jack in a No Ropes Barbed Wire match
8.	ECW	ECW Hardcore TV; January 7, 1995	Philadelphia, Pennsylvania	ECW Arena	1,000	Shane Douglas (c) vs. Tully Blanchard for the ECW World Heavyweight Championship
8.	ECW	Double Tables; February 4, 1995	Philadelphia, Pennsylvania	ECW Arena	1,000	Public Enemy (Johnny Grunge & Rocco Rock) (c) vs. Sabu & The Tazmaniac in a Double Tables match for the ECW Tag Team Championship
8.	ECW	Hostile City Showdown; April 15, 1995	Philadelphia, Pennsylvania	ECW Arena	1,000	Cactus Jack vs. Terry Funk
8.	ECW	Heat Wave; July 15, 1995	Philadelphia, Pennsylvania	ECW Arena	1,000	Public Enemy (Johnny Grunge & Rocco Rock) vs. The Gangstas (New Jack & Mustafa Saed) in a Steel Cage match
9.	ECW	December to Dismember; December 9, 1995	Philadelphia, Pennsylvania	ECW Arena	900	Mikey Whipwreck (c) vs. The Sandman vs. Steve Austin in a 3-Way Dance match for the ECW Heavyweight Championship
10.	ECW	Enter the Sandman; May 13, 1995	Philadelphia, Pennsylvania	ECW Arena	875	The Sandman (c) vs. Shane Douglas for the ECW Heavyweight Championship

Top 10 most-attended shows in 1996
No.	Promotion	Event	Location	Venue	Attendance	Main Event(s)
1.	ECW	ECW vs. IWA vs. True FMW: Total War (Day 2); August 11, 1996	Tokyo, Japan	Korakuen Hall	2,000	Tarzan Goto (c) vs. Buh Buh Ray Dudley for the IWA Heavyweight Championship
2.	ECW	ECW vs. IWA vs. True FMW: Total War (Day 1); August 10, 1996	Yokohama, Japan	Yokohama Cultural Gymnasium	1,700	Tommy Dreamer and Terry Gordy vs. Raven and Stevie Richards
3.	ECW	Hardcore Heaven; June 22, 1996	Philadelphia, Pennsylvania	ECW Arena	1,511	Sabu vs. Rob Van Dam
4.	ECW	Heat Wave; July 13, 1996	Philadelphia, Pennsylvania	ECW Arena	1,500	Raven's Nest (Raven (c), Brian Lee & Stevie Richards) vs. Tommy Dreamer, The Sandman & Terry Gordy in a Steel Cage match for the ECW World Heavyweight Championship
4.	ECW	The Doctor is In; August 3, 1996	Philadelphia, Pennsylvania	ECW Arena	1,500	Tommy Dreamer and Steve Williams vs. Brian Lee and Taz
4.	ECW	November to Remember; November 16, 1996	Philadelphia, Pennsylvania	ECW Arena	1,500	The Sandman (c) vs. Raven for the ECW World Heavyweight Championship
5.	ECW	Natural Born Killaz; August 24, 1996	Philadelphia, Pennsylvania	ECW Arena	1,400	The Gangstas (New Jack & Mustafa Saed) (c) vs. The Eliminators (Saturn & Kronus) in a Steel Cage Weapons match for the ECW Tag Team Championship
6.	ECW	High Incident; October 26, 1996	Philadelphia, Pennsylvania	ECW Arena	1,350	Tommy Dreamer vs. Brian Lee in a Scaffold match
7.	ECW	CyberSlam; February 17, 1996	Philadelphia, Pennsylvania	ECW Arena	1,300	Raven (c) vs. The Sandman for the ECW World Heavyweight Championship
7.	ECW	Raven vs. The Sandman; December 28, 1996	Allentown, Pennsylvania	Agricultural Hall	1,300	Raven (c) vs. The Sandman in a Dog Collar match for the ECW World Heavyweight Championship
8.	ECW	When Worlds Collide II; September 14, 1996	Philadelphia, Pennsylvania	ECW Arena	1,250	Brian Lee & The Eliminators (Saturn & Kronus) vs. Tommy Dreamer, Steve Williams & Terry Gordy
9.	ECW	Big Apple Blizzard Blast; February 3, 1996	New York City, New York	Lost Battalion Hall	1,200	The Sandman & 2 Cold Scorpio vs. The Gangstas (New Jack & Mustafa Saed)
9.	ECW	Big Ass Extreme Bash (Day 1); March 8, 1996	New York City, New York	Lost Battalion Hall	1,200	Raven (c) vs. The Sandman for the ECW Heavyweight Championship
9.	ECW	Big Ass Extreme Bash (Day 2); March 9, 1996	Philadelphia, Pennsylvania	ECW Arena	1,200	The Sandman & 2 Cold Scorpio vs. The Gangstas (New Jack & Mustafa Saed) vs. The Headhunters (Headhunter I & Headhunter II) in a 3-Way Dance match
9.	ECW	ECW Hardcore TV; May 18, 1996	Allentown, Pennsylvania	Agricultural Hall	1,200	The Eliminators (Saturn & Kronus) (c) vs. The Gangstas (New Jack & Mustafa Saed) for the ECW Tag Team Championship
9.	ECW	Ultimate Jeopardy; October 5, 1996	Philadelphia, Pennsylvania	ECW Arena	1,200	Stevie Richards (c) & Brian Lee vs. The Sandman & Tommy Dreamer in an Ultimate Jeopardy match for the ECW World Heavyweight Championship
10.	ECW	House Party; January 5, 1996	Philadelphia, Pennsylvania	ECW Arena	1,150	Public Enemy (Johnny Grunge & Rocco Rock) vs. The Gangstas (New Jack & Mustafa Saed) in a Street Fight match
10.	ECW	Holiday Hell; December 7, 1996	Philadelphia, Pennsylvania	ECW Arena	1,150	The Sandman (c) vs. Raven in a Barbed Wire match for the ECW Heavyweight Championship

Top 10 most-attended shows in 1997
No.	Promotion	Event	Location	Venue	Attendance	Main Event(s)
1.	ECW	November to Remember; November 30, 1997	Monaca, Pennsylvania	Golden Dome	4,634	Bam Bam Bigelow (c) vs. Shane Douglas for the ECW World Heavyweight Championship
2.	ECW	Terry Funk's WrestleFest; September 6, 1997	Amarillo, Texas	Tri-State Fairgrounds Coliseum	3,800	Terry Funk vs. Bret Hart in a No Disqualification match with special referee Dennis Stamp
3.	ECW	Terry Funk vs. Shane Douglas; August 2, 1997	Monaca, Pennsylvania	Golden Dome	2,200	Terry Funk (c) vs. Shane Douglas for the ECW World Heavyweight Championship
4.	ECW	Hardcore Heaven; August 17, 1997	Fort Lauderdale, Florida	War Memorial Auditorium	1,950	Sabu (c) vs. Shane Douglas vs. Terry Funk in a 3-Way Dance match for the ECW World Heavyweight Championship
5.	ECW	The Eliminators vs. The Dudley Boys; May 24, 1997	Monaca, Pennsylvania	Golden Dome	1,926	The Eliminators (Saturn and Kronus) (c) vs. The Dudley Boys (Big Dick Dudley and D-Von Dudley) in a Weapons match for the ECW Tag Team Championship
6.	ECW	Taz & Tommy Dreamer vs. Sabu & Rob Van Dam; July 26, 1997	Buffalo, New York	Flickinger Center	1,800	Taz & Tommy Dreamer vs. Sabu & Rob Van Dam
7.	ECW	Sabu vs. The Sandman; December 13, 1997	Buffalo, New York	Flickinger Center	1,700	Sabu vs. The Sandman in a Death match
8.	ECW	Buffalo Invasion; May 17, 1997	Buffalo, New York	Flickinger Center	1,697	Terry Funk (c) vs. Big Stevie Cool vs. Raven vs. The Sandman in a 4-Way match for the ECW World Heavyweight Championship
9.	ECW	As Good as it Gets; September 20, 1997	Philadelphia, Pennsylvania	ECW Arena	1,600	The Dudley Boys (Buh Buh Ray Dudley & D-Von Dudley) (c) vs. The Gangstanators (Kronus & New Jack) for the ECW World Tag Team Championship
9.	ECW	Sabu vs. Shane Douglas vs. Tommy Dreamer; October 18, 1997	Philadelphia, Pennsylvania	ECW Arena	1,600	Sabu vs. Shane Douglas vs. Tommy Dreamer in a 3-Way Dance match
9.	ECW	Better Than Ever; December 6, 1997	Philadelphia, Pennsylvania	ECW Arena	1,600	Sabu & Rob Van Dam vs. Tommy Dreamer & Taz
10.	ECW	Raven vs. Pitbull #2; March 1, 1997	Scranton, Pennsylvania	Catholic Youth Center	1,590	Raven (c) vs. Pitbull #2 for the ECW World Heavyweight Championship

Top 10 most-attended shows in 1998
No.	Promotion	Event	Location	Venue	Attendance	Main Event(s)
1.	ECW	November to Remember; November 1, 1998	New Orleans, Louisiana	Lakefront Arena	5,800	Taz, Sabu & Rob Van Dam vs. The Triple Threat (Shane Douglas, Bam Bam Bigelow and Chris Candido)
2.	ECW	Heat Wave; August 2, 1998	Trotwood, Ohio	Hara Arena	4,376	Tommy Dreamer, The Sandman & Spike Dudley vs. The Dudley Boys (Buh Buh Ray Dudley, D-Von Dudley & Big Dick Dudley) in the Street Fight match
3.	ECW	Living Dangerously; March 1, 1998	Asbury Park, New Jersey	Convention Hall	3,700	Chris Candido and Shane Douglas (mystery partner) vs. Lance Storm and Al Snow (mystery partner) in a Dream Partner match
4.	ECW	Sabu & Rob Van Dam vs. The Dudley Boys; October 22, 1998	Buffalo, New York	Flickinger Center	3,500	Sabu & Rob Van Dam (c) vs. The Dudleys (Buh Buh Ray Dudley & D-Von Dudley) for the ECW Tag Team Championship
5.	ECW	Sabu & Rob Van Dam vs. The Dudley Boys; September 12, 1998	Pittsburgh, Pennsylvania	David L. Lawrence Convention Center	3,470	Sabu & Rob Van Dam (c) vs. The Dudley Boys (Buh Buh Ray Dudley & D-Von Dudley) for the ECW Tag Team Championship
6.	ECW	Wrestlepalooza; May 3, 1998	Marietta, Georgia	Cobb County Civic Center	3,401	Shane Douglas (c) vs. Al Snow for the ECW World Heavyweight Championship
7.	ECW	Rob Van Dam vs. Bam Bam Bigelow; October 23, 1998	Pittsburgh, Pennsylvania	David L. Lawrence Convention Center	3,374	Rob Van Dam (c) vs. Bam Bam Bigelow for the ECW World Television Championship
8.	ECW	The Sandman, Tommy Dreamer & Spike Dudley vs. The Dudley Boys; May 9, 1998	Buffalo, New York	Flickinger Center	3,241	The Sandman, Tommy Dreamer & Spike Dudley vs. The Dudley Boys (Buh Buh Ray Dudley, D-Von Dudley & Big Dick Dudley)
9.	ECW	The Dudley Boys vs. Sabu & Rob Van Dam vs. Shane Douglas & Taz; December 5, 1998	Buffalo, New York	Flickinger Center	2,970	The Dudley Boys (Buh Buh Ray Dudley and D-Von Dudley) (c) vs. Sabu & Rob Van Dam vs. Shane Douglas & Taz in a 3-Way Dance match for the ECW Tag Team Championship
10.	ECW	Sabu & Rob Van Dam vs. Triple Threat vs. The Dudley Boys; August 15, 1998	Buffalo, New York	Flickinger Center	2,800	Sabu & Rob Van Dam vs. Triple Threat (Bam Bam Bigelow & Chris Candido) vs. The Dudley Boys (Buh Buh Ray Dudley & D-Von Dudley) in a 3-Way Dance match

Top 10 most-attended shows in 1999
No.	Promotion	Event	Location	Venue	Attendance	Main Event(s)
1.	ECW	Anarchy Rulz; September 19, 1999	Villa Park, Illinois	Odeum Sports & Expo Center	6,000	Rob Van Dam (c) vs. Balls Mahoney for the ECW World Television Championship
2.	ECW	ECW on TNN; September 11, 1999	Buffalo, New York	Flickinger Center	3,960	Rob Van Dam (c) vs. Uganda for the ECW World Television Championship
3.	ECW	ECW on TNN; November 18, 1999	Chicago, Illinois	Aragon Ballroom	3,912	Mike Awesome (c) vs. Spike Dudley for the ECW World Heavyweight Championship
4.	ECW	Living Dangerously; March 21, 1999	Asbury Park, New Jersey	Convention Hall	3,900	Taz (c-WHC) vs. Sabu (c-FTW) in a unification match for the ECW and FTW World Heavyweight Championships
4.	ECW	ECW Hardcore TV; April 17, 1999	Buffalo, New York	Flickinger Center	3,900	Rob Van Dam (c) vs. D-Von Dudley for the ECW Tag Team Championship
5.	ECW	Heat Wave; July 18, 1999	Trotwood, Ohio	Hara Arena	3,700	Taz (c) vs. Yoshihiro Tajiri for the ECW World Heavyweight Championship
6.	ECW	ECW on TNN; November 13, 1999	Binghamton, New York	Broome County Veterans Memorial Arena	3,500	Tommy Dreamer & Raven (c) vs. Chris Candido & Rhino for the ECW Tag Team Championship
7.	ECW	ECW Hardcore TV; August 14, 1999	Toledo, Ohio	Seagate Center	3,283	The Dudley Boys (Buh Buh Ray Dudley & D-Von Dudley) (c) vs. Spike Dudley & Balls Mahoney for the ECW Tag Team Championship
8.	ECW	Sabu & Rob Van Dam vs. The Dudley Boys; February 13, 1999	Poughkeepsie, New York	Mid-Hudson Civic Center	3,000	Sabu & Rob Van Dam (c) vs. The Dudley Boys (Buh Buh Ray Dudley & D-Von Dudley) for the ECW Tag Team Championship
8.	ECW	ECW Hardcore TV; June 17, 1999	Villa Park, Illinois	Odeum Sports & Expo Center	3,000	Rob Van Dam (c) vs. Lance Storm for the ECW World Television Championship
8.	ECW	November to Remember; November 7, 1999	Buffalo, New York	Flickinger Center	3,000	The Sandman, Tommy Dreamer & Raven vs. Rhino and The Impact Players (Justin Credible & Lance Storm)
8.	ECW	ECW on TNN; December 10, 1999	Richmond, Virginia	Verizon Wireless Arena at the Siegel Center	3,000	Mike Awesome (c) vs. Vic Grimes for the ECW World Heavyweight Championship
9.	ECW	ECW Hardcore TV; January 23, 1999	Detroit, Michigan	Michigan State Fairgrounds Coliseum	2,900	Taz (c) vs. El Diablo for the ECW World Heavyweight Championship
10.	ECW	Hardcore Heaven; May 16, 1999	Poughkeepsie, New York	Mid-Hudson Civic Center	2,800	Taz (c) vs. Buh Buh Ray Dudley for the ECW World Heavyweight Championship
10.	ECW	ECW on TNN; December 23, 1999	White Plains, New York	Westchester County Center	2,800	Masato Tanaka (c) vs. Mike Awesome for the ECW World Heavyweight Championship

Top 10 most-attended shows in 2000–01
No.	Promotion	Event	Location	Venue	Attendance	Main Event(s)
1.	ECW	Heat Wave; July 16, 2000	Los Angeles, California	Grand Olympic Auditorium	5,700	Justin Credible (c) vs. Tommy Dreamer in a "Stairway to Hell" match for the ECW World Heavyweight Championship
2.	ECW	ECW on TNN; September 9, 2000	Mississauga, Ontario	Hershey Centre	5,000	Justin Credible (c) vs. Jerry Lynn and Steve Corino in a 3-Way Dance match for the ECW World Heavyweight Championship
3.	ECW	Guilty as Charged; January 9, 2000	Birmingham, Alabama	Boutwell Memorial Auditorium	4,700	Mike Awesome (c) vs. Spike Dudley for the ECW World Heavyweight Championship
4.	ECW	Anarchy Rulz; October 1, 2000	St. Paul, Minnesota	Roy Wilkins Auditorium	4,600	Justin Credible (c) vs. Jerry Lynn for the ECW World Heavyweight Championship
4.	ECW	November to Remember; November 5, 2000	Villa Park, Illinois	Odeum Sports & Expo Center	4,600	Jerry Lynn (c) vs. Justin Credible, Steve Corino and The Sandman in a "Double Jeopardy" match for the ECW World Heavyweight Championship
5.	ECW	ECW on TNN; April 8, 2000	Buffalo, New York	Flickinger Center	3,700	Super Crazy (c) vs. Yoshihiro Tajiri and Little Guido in a 3-Way Dance match for the ECW World Television Championship
6.	ECW	ECW on TNN; June 24, 2000	Villa Park, Illinois	Odeum Sports & Expo Center	3,500	Justin Credible (c) vs. The Sandman for the ECW World Heavyweight Championship
7.	ECW	Hardcore Heaven; May 14, 2000	Milwaukee, Wisconsin	The Rave	3,400	Justin Credible (c) vs. Lance Storm and Tommy Dreamer in a 3-Way Dance match for the ECW World Heavyweight Championship
8.	ECW	Living Dangerously; March 12, 2000	Danbury, Connecticut	O'Neill Center	3,390	Super Crazy vs. Rhino in a tournament final for the vacant ECW World Television Championship
9.	ECW	ECW on TNN; January 22, 2000	New Orleans, Louisiana	Lakefront Arena	3,000	Mike Awesome (c) vs. Spike Dudley for the ECW World Heavyweight Championship
9.	ECW	ECW on TNN; March 18, 2000	Salem, New Hampshire	Ice Center	3,000	Impact Players (Lance Storm & Justin Credible) (c) vs. Mike Awesome & Raven for the ECW World Tag Team Championship
9.	ECW	ECW on TNN; March 31, 2000	Richmond, Virginia	Alltel Pavilion at the Siegel Center	3,000	Mike Awesome (c) vs. Rhino for the ECW World Heavyweight Championship
9.	ECW	ECW on TNN; August 4, 2000	Huntington, West Virginia	Huntington Civic Arena	3,000	Justin Credible (c) vs. Kid Kash for the ECW World Heavyweight Championship
10.	ECW	Wrestlepalooza; April 16, 2000	St. Charles, Missouri	Family Arena	2,800	Dusty Rhodes, New Jack, The Sandman & Tommy Dreamer vs. The Network (Steve Corino, Jack Victory, Rhino & Yoshihiro Tajiri)

== See also ==
- List of professional wrestling attendance records
- List of professional wrestling attendance records in Canada
- List of professional wrestling attendance records in Europe
- List of professional wrestling attendance records in Japan
- List of professional wrestling attendance records in Mexico
- List of professional wrestling attendance records in Puerto Rico
- List of professional wrestling attendance records in the United Kingdom
- List of professional wrestling attendance records in the United States
- List of WWE attendance records

== Notes ==
- ^{†} Retractable roof stadium
- ^{*} Open air venue
