= Terror at Tabor =

1993 Extreme Championship Wrestling supercard event

- Promotion: Eastern Championship Wrestling
- Date: November 12, 1993 (aired November 23 and 30, 1993)
- City: Philadelphia, Pennsylvania, US
- Venue: Tabor Community Center

Event chronology
← Previous; NWA Bloodfest	Next → November to Remember

Terror at Tabor was a professional wrestling live event produced by Eastern Championship Wrestling (ECW) on November 12, 1993, the day prior to November to Remember. The event was held in the Tabor Community Center in Philadelphia, Pennsylvania in the United States. Excerpts from Terror at Tabor aired on episodes #33 and #34 of ECW Hardcore TV on November 23 and 30, 1993.

== Event ==
Joey Styles provided commentary for the event which was added in post-production for the ECW Hardcore TV broadcasts, with Rockin' Rebel providing color commentary for some elements of the broadcast. The referees for the event were Jim Molineaux and John Finnegan.

The opening bout was a battle royal that was won by Kevin Sullivan.

The second bout was a singles match between Chris Michaels and Keith Scherer. Michaels won the bout by pinfall.

The third bout saw ECW Tag Team Champions Johnny Hotbody and Tony Stetson defend their titles against J.T. Smith and the Sandman. Hotbody and Stetson won the match after their manager, Hunter Q. Robbins III, hit The Sandman with his cane, enabling Hotbody to pin him.

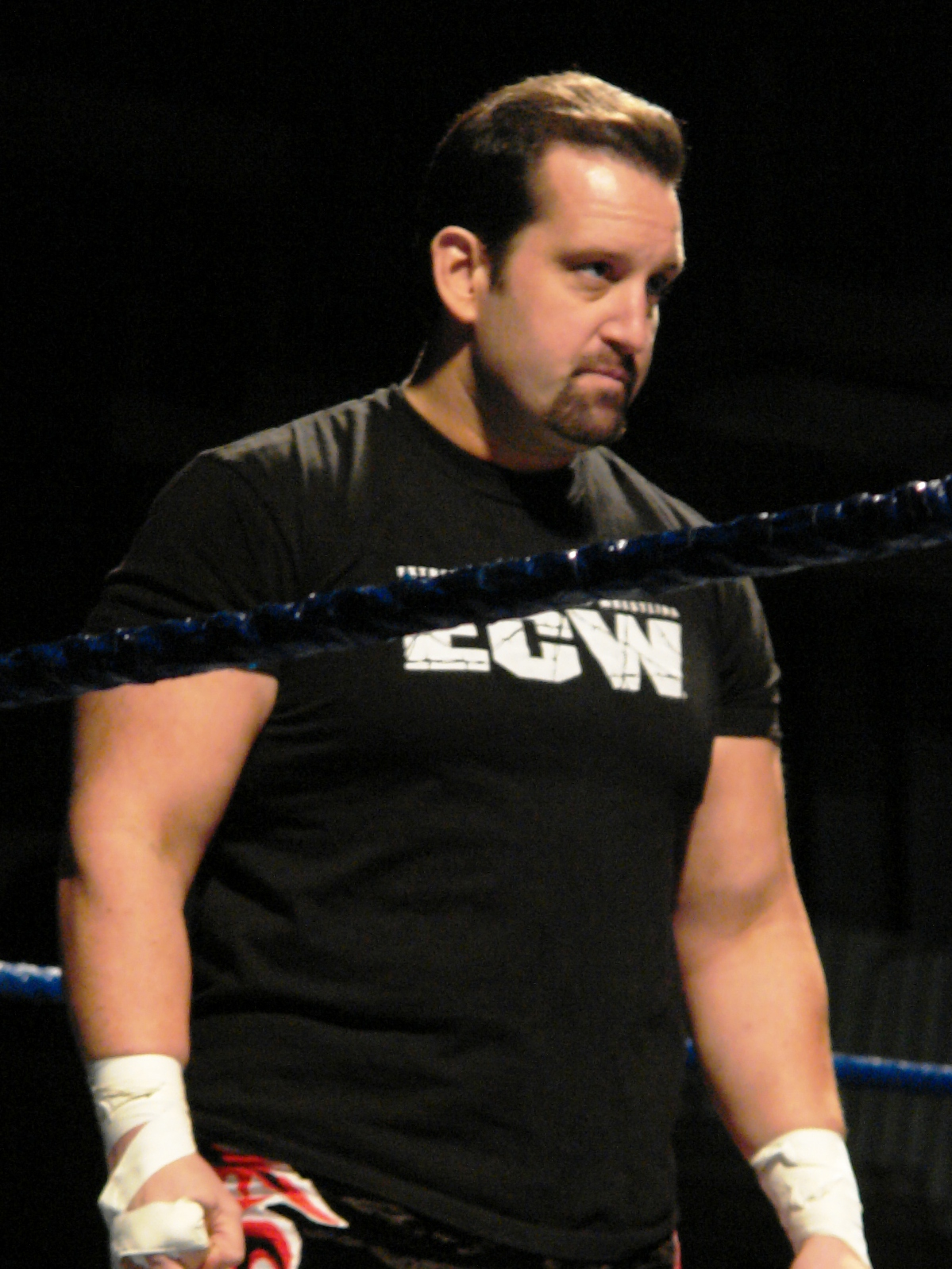
Tommy Dreamer defeated Johnny Grunge in the main event of Terror at Tabor.

The fourth bout saw ECW Heavyweight Champion Sabu defend his title against the Tazmaniac. Sabu won the bout to retain his title, pinning the Tazmaniac following a diving splash.

The fifth bout was a tag team match between the Bad Breed and the Public Enemy. The match was won by the Public Enemy.

The sixth bout was an intergender six-person tag team match pitting J.T. Smith and the Sandman along with the Sandman's valet Peaches against Johnny Hotbody and Tony Stetson and their manager, Hunter Q. Robbins III that arose following Robbin's interference in the earlier title match. Towards the end of the match, Hotbdy and Stetson forced Robbins into the ring. Peaches then kneed Robbins in the groin and pinned him. Following the match, Hotbody and Stetson attacked Smith and the Sandman, after which Mr. Hughes and Jason Knight attacked the Sandman.

The seventh bout was a singles match between Chris Michaels and Tommy Cairo. Cairo won the match by pinfall following a German suplex.

The eighth bout was a singles match between Keith Scherer and Mr. Hughes. Mr. Hughes won a short squash by pinfall following a spinning side slam.

The ninth bout was a tag team match between Badd Company and Don E. Allen and Mr. Hughes. The match was won by Badd Company.

The tenth bout was a singles match between Paul Diamond and Rocco Rock. The match was won by Diamond.

The eleventh bout was a tag team match between the Bad Breed and Johnny Hotbody and Tony Stetson, with Hotbody and Stetson's ECW Tag Team Championship not on the line. The match was won by the Bad Breed.

The twelfth bout was a singles match between Keith Scherer and Kevin Sullivan in Scherer's third match of the evening. Sullivan won the match by pinfall following a double foot stomp.

The main event was a singles match between Tommy Dreamer and Johnny Grunge. Dreamer won the bout by pinfall.

== Results ==
No.	Results	Stipulations	Times
1	Kevin Sullivan won a battle royal	Battle royal	—
2	Chris Michaels defeated Keith Scherer by pinfall	Singles match	—
3	Johnny Hotbody and Tony Stetson (c) (with Hunter Q. Robbins III) defeated J.T. Smith and the Sandman (with Peaches)	Tag team match for the ECW Tag Team Championship	7:18
4	Sabu (c) (with 911 and Paul E. Dangerously) defeated the Tazmaniac (with Tony Rumble) by pinfall	Singles match for the ECW Heavyweight Championship	—
5	The Public Enemy (Johnny Grunge and Rocco Rock) defeated the Bad Breed (Axl Rotten and Ian Rotten)	Tag team match	—
6	J.T. Smith, Peaches, and the Sandman defeated Hunter Q. Robbins III, Johnny Hotbody, and Tony Stetson by pinfall	Intergender six-person tag team match	—
7	Tommy Cairo defeated Chris Michaels by pinfall	Singles match	4:46
8	Mr. Hughes (with Jason Knight) defeated Keith Scherer by pinfall	Singles match	2:29
9	Badd Company (Pat Tanaka and Paul Diamond) defeated Don E. Allen and Mr. Hughes	Tag team match	—
10	Paul Diamond defeated Rocco Rock	Singles match	—
11	The Bad Breed (Axl Rotten and Ian Rotten) defeated Johnny Hotbody and Tony Stetson	Tag team match	—
12	Kevin Sullivan (with Woman) defeated Keith Scherer by pinfall	Singles match	1:03
13	Tommy Dreamer defeated Johnny Grunge	Singles match	—
(c) / – the champion(s) heading into the match
