= November to Remember (1993) =

1993 Eastern Championship Wrestling supercard event

- Promotion: Eastern Championship Wrestling
- Date: November 13, 1993 (aired November 16, 1993)
- City: Philadelphia, Pennsylvania, United States
- Venue: ECW Arena
- Attendance: 1,492

Event chronology
← Previous; Terror at Tabor	Next → ASWA/ECW/MEWF Supershow

November to Remember chronology
← Previous; First	Next → 1994

November to Remember (1993), the inaugural November to Remember professional wrestling event produced by Eastern Championship Wrestling (ECW), took place on November 13, 1993 (the day after Terror at Tabor) in the ECW Arena in Philadelphia, Pennsylvania in the United States.

Ten professional wrestling matches took place at the event. The main event was a tag team match in which the Heavyweight Champion Sabu teamed with Road Warrior Hawk to take on the Television Champion Terry Funk and King Kong Bundy, in which both Sabu and Funk defended the ECW Heavyweight Championship and the ECW Television Championship respectively.

Two matches from the event (The Sandman versus Jim Neidhart and The Suicide Blondes (Johnny Hotbody and Tony Stetson) versus Johnny Gunn and Tommy Dreamer) aired on episode #32 of Eastern Championship Wrestling on November 16, 1993. Commentary was provided by Joey Styles and Tony Rumble.

== Storylines ==
The event featured wrestlers from pre-existing scripted feuds and storylines. Wrestlers portrayed villains, heroes, or less distinguishable characters in the scripted events that built tension and culminated in a wrestling match or series of matches played out on ECW's television program Hardcore TV.

At UltraClash, Sal Bellomo defeated Sir Richard Michaels in a strap match and then Rockin' Rebel returned to ECW and attacked Bellomo with a steel chair after being suspended from ECW by Tod Gordon on the July 27 episode of Hardcore TV for stripping a woman at Super Summer Sizzler Spectacular and blinding Peaches by tossing ink into her eyes. On the October 5 episode of Hardcore TV, Rebel claimed to have ended Bellomo's career and warned he would "destroy" him if he ever came back to ECW. The following week on Hardcore TV, Rebel attacked his manager Chris Michaels due to Michaels' son being a fan of Bellomo and then defeated Michaels in an impromptu match. On the October 26 episode of Hardcore TV, Rebel faced Michaels in a rematch, during which Rebel grabbed a chair to hit Michaels with it but Bellomo returned and made the rescue. Later that night, Tod Gordon announced that Bellomo would be facing Rebel in a chairs match at November to Remember.

Sabu made his ECW debut as Hunter Q. Robbins III's newest client at Bloodfest: Part 1, where he defeated The Tazmaniac. Also at the event, Terry Funk defeated Jimmy Snuka in a cage match to win the Television Championship. Sabu was soon banned from television by Tod Gordon on the October 12 episode of Hardcore TV. However, Sabu was reinstated by Paul E. Dangerously as the Heavyweight Champion Shane Douglas' bodyguard on the October 19 episode of Hardcore TV. However, Douglas disliked Sabu. On October 26 episode of Hardcore TV, it was announced that Sabu and Road Warrior Hawk would take on Funk and a partner of his choice in a tag team match at November to Remember, in which Funk would defend his Television Championship. The following week on Hardcore TV, Sabu defeated Douglas to win the ECW Heavyweight Championship, which resulted in the Heavyweight Championship being also defended in the tag team match at November to Remember.

At Bloodfest: Part 1, The Suicide Blondes (Johnny Hotbody and Tony Stetson) defended the Tag Team Championship against Badd Company (Pat Tanaka and Paul Diamond), during which The Public Enemy (Rocco Rock and Johnny Grunge) interfered and attacked Badd Company, thus costing them the title shot. This led to a match between Badd Company and Public Enemy on the October 19 episode of Hardcore TV, which Badd Company won. On the October 26 episode of Hardcore TV, Public Enemy were scheduled to take on Jimmy Snuka and Don Muraco in a match but lost by forfeit due to Badd Company attacking him before the match and the brawl was soon joined by The Bad Breed (Axl Rotten and Ian Rotten). The three teams competed in a triple threat steel cage match at Bloodfest: Part 2, which Public Enemy won. On the November 2 episode of Hardcore TV, Matty in the House announced various stipulations for Public Enemy and Badd Company's match at November to Remember with the fans voting for the stipulations.

Tommy Dreamer made his ECW debut at Bloodfest: Part 2 against The Tazmaniac in a losing effort. On the October 26 episode of Hardcore TV, it was announced that Dreamer and Tazmaniac would compete in a rematch at November to Remember.

A confrontation took place between Sherri Martel and Madusa at a convention, which led to Joey Styles announcing that the two would compete in a match against each other at November to Remember.

On the October 26 episode of Hardcore TV, several matches were announced for November to Remember including a match between Mr. Hughes and Johnny Gunn and a shoot match between Kevin Sullivan and Tommy Cairo at November to Remember.

== Event ==
The opening match was a chairs match, in which Salvatore Bellomo defeated Rockin' Rebel by forfeit.

The second bout was a singles match between The Sandman and Jim Neidhart. After a back and forth action, both men knocked out each other by hitting clotheslines to each other and their arms were draped over one another, resulting in both men getting pinned and the match ended in a double pinfall. After the match, Jason offered an allegiance to Neidhart but Neidhart refused and then Sandman also refused his services, leading to Jason and Mr. Hughes assaulting Sandman.

The third bout saw The Public Enemy (Rocco Rock and Johnny Grunge) defeat Badd Company (Pat Tanaka and Paul Diamond) in a South Philly Hood match.

The fourth bout was a singles match in which Kevin Sullivan defeated Tommy Cairo.

The fifth bout was a singles match in which Sherri Martel was scheduled to take on Madusa; Madusa did not appear and was replaced by Malia Hosaka. Martel hit Jim Molineaux with a steel chair thus getting disqualified.

The sixth bout saw The Suicide Blondes (Johnny Hotbody and Tony Stetson) successfully defend the ECW Tag Team Championship against The Bad Breed (Axl Rotten and Ian Rotten).

Immediately after the match, Johnny Gunn and Tommy Dreamer challenged Suicide Blondes for the titles. As the match began, the champions attempted to attack the challengers with the title belts but Gunn and Dreamer ducked the attack and nailed them with atomic drops and powerslammed Suicide Blondes to simultaneously pin them for the titles.

The eight bout was a singles match in which The Tazmaniac defeated Tommy Dreamer by executing a Northern Lights suplex.

The ninth bout was a single match in which Mr. Hughes defeated Johnny Gunn.

The main event was a Winner Takes All tag team match, in which the Heavyweight Champion Sabu teamed with Road Warrior Hawk to take on the Television Champion Terry Funk and his mystery partner, with Sabu putting his Heavyweight Championship and Funk putting his Television Championship on the line. King Kong Bundy was revealed to be Funk's mystery tag team partner. During the match, Bundy turned on Funk by hitting him with an Avalanche Splash, allowing Sabu to pin Funk with a small package to retain the Heavyweight Championship and win Funk's Television Championship.

== Aftermath ==
Although initially a live event, November to Remember would soon become the flagship event of ECW after ECW began broadcasting its events on pay-per-view in 1997.

After pinning Terry Funk at November to Remember, Sabu continued his feud with Funk as Paul E. Dangerously insulted Funk by saying that Funk's father would have died if he had seen him. On the December 7 episode of Hardcore TV, it was announced that Sabu would defend the ECW Heavyweight Championship against Funk at Holiday Hell in a main event picked by fans.

Public Enemy continued their rivalry against Badd Company as they attacked him backstage on the November 16 episode of Hardcore TV, culminating in Public Enemy being arrested on the following week's Hardcore TV. On the December 7 episode of Hardcore TV, a Bodycount match was set up between Badd Company member Pat Tanaka and Public Enemy member Rocco Rock, with their tag team partners locked in separate jail cells and the winner would be able to free his partner while the other jail cell would explode and if the match extended beyond fifteen minutes then both cages would explode.

On the December 14 episode of Hardcore TV, Tommy Dreamer and Johnny Gunn were scheduled to defend the Tag Team Championship against Kevin Sullivan and The Tazmaniac. However, Gunn could not show up due to bad weather and Shane Douglas substituted for him and defended the title with Dreamer on Gunn's behalf. Douglas turned on Dreamer by hitting him with a chain, which allowed Sullivan and Tazmaniac to win the titles. This led to a match between Douglas and Dreamer at Holiday Hell. The duo competed in a match before Holiday Hell on the December 21 episode of Hardcore TV, where Douglas defeated Dreamer by disqualification after wrapping Dreamer's hand with the chain and lying down, causing the referee to believe that Dreamer had hit him with the chain.

Mr. Hughes' assault on The Sandman at November to Remember led to a feud between the two men. On the December 14 episode of Hardcore TV, Sandman attacked Hughes during the main event in which Hughes took on Chad Austin. The feud between Sandman and Hughes culminated in a match between the two at Holiday Hell.

== Results ==
No.	Results	Stipulations	Times
1	Salvatore Bellomo defeated Rockin' Rebel by forfeit	Chairs match	—
2	The Sandman vs. Jim Neidhart ended in a no-contest	Singles match	6:07
3	The Public Enemy (Rocco Rock and Johnny Grunge) defeated Badd Company (Pat Tanaka and Paul Diamond)	"South Philly Hood" tag team match	16:40
4	Kevin Sullivan defeated Tommy Cairo by pinfall	"Shoot match"	2:15
5	Malia Hosaka defeated Sherri Martel by disqualification	Singles match	6:00
6	The Suicide Blondes (Johnny Hotbody and Tony Stetson) (c) defeated The Bad Breed (Axl Rotten and Ian Rotten)	Tag team match for the ECW Tag Team Championship	6:11
7	Johnny Gunn and Tommy Dreamer defeated The Suicide Blondes (Johnny Hotbody and Tony Stetson) (c) by pinfall	Tag team match for the ECW Tag Team Championship	0:09
8	The Tazmaniac defeated Tommy Dreamer by pinfall	Singles match	7:00
9	Mr. Hughes defeated Johnny Gunn by pinfall	Singles match	9:40
10	Sabu (c - Heavyweight) and Road Warrior Hawk defeated Terry Funk (c - Television) and King Kong Bundy by pinfall	Winner takes all match for the ECW Heavyweight Championship and the ECW Television Championship	12:00
(c) / – the champion(s) heading into the match

== See also ==
- 1993 in professional wrestling
