= List of ECW World Tag Team Champions =

Listing of professional wrestling champions for the ECW World Tag Team Championship

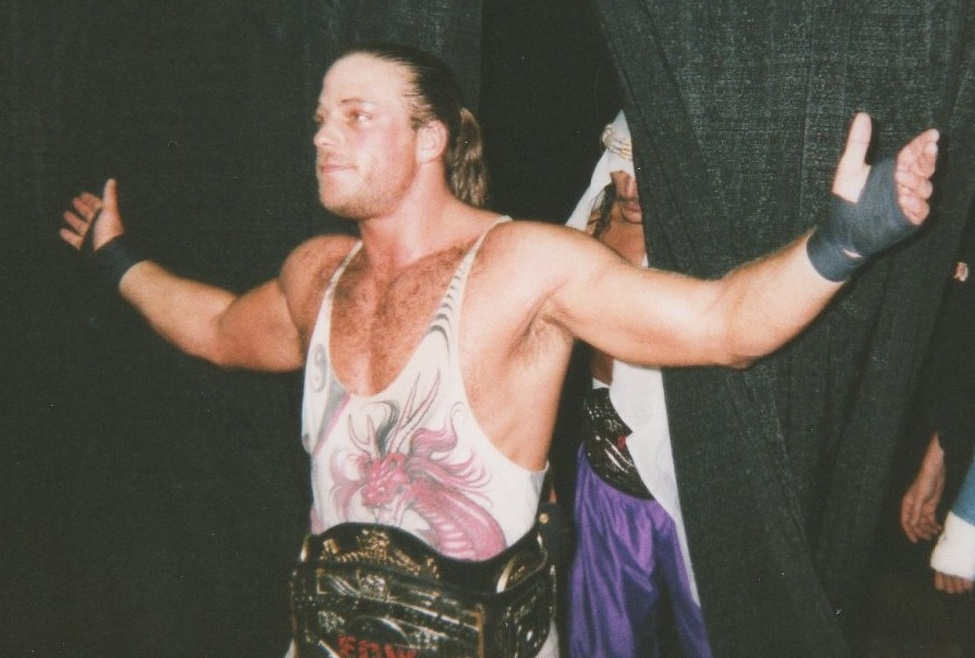
Rob Van Dam and Sabu as ECW World Tag Team Champions at an ECW event August 4, 1998

The ECW World Tag Team Championship was a professional wrestling world tag team championship contested for in Extreme Championship Wrestling (ECW).

Originally, ECW was known as Eastern Championship Wrestling when it was a member of the National Wrestling Alliance (NWA), an organization that had numerous member promotions. ECW withdrew as a member of the NWA in 1994 and renamed itself to Extreme Championship Wrestling. The championship remained active until April 2001, when ECW filed for bankruptcy. All of ECW's assets were later purchased by World Wrestling Entertainment (WWE) in mid-2003, including the copyrights to ECW's championships.

In May 2006, WWE extended its promotion by adding ECW as a third additional brand, the others being Raw and SmackDown!, in a storyline sports extension. The ECW World Heavyweight Championship was the only former ECW championship reactivated by WWE for the new brand. However, the title history was published by WWE on its website.

Title reigns were determined either by professional wrestling matches with different tag teams (a duo of wrestlers) or stables (a group of more than two wrestlers) using ring names, involved in pre-existing scripted feuds or were awarded the title due to scripted circumstances; the championship could have also been vacated by the promotion. Wrestlers were portrayed as either villains or heroes as they followed a series of tension-building events, which culminated in a wrestling match or series of matches for the championship.

The title was mostly won at live events in eight American states. The inaugural champions were The Super Destroyers (A. J. Petrucci and Doug Stahl), who won a tournament final at a live event to win the titles on June 23, 1992. Danny Doring and Roadkill, who won the titles on December 3, 2000, at the Massacre on 34th Street pay-per-view event, were the final wrestlers to have held the championship before ECW filed for bankruptcy. At 283 days, The Super Destroyers' first reign was the longest, while The Dudley Boyz' eighth reign and the team of Raven and Stevie Richards' second reign were the shortest, at less than one day. With eight reigns, The Dudley Boyz held the most reigns as a tag team and individually. Overall, there were 51 reigns among 31 teams.

== Reigns ==
=== Names ===
Name	Years
ECW Tag Team Championship	June 23, 1992 – September 18, 1993
NWA-ECW Tag Team Championship	September 18, 1993 – August 27, 1994
ECW World Tag Team Championship	August 27, 1994 – April 11, 2001

=== Reigns ===
Key
No.	Overall reign number
Reign	Reign number for the specific team—reign numbers for the individuals are in parentheses, if different
Days	Number of days held
<1	Reign lasted less than a day

No.	Champion	Championship change			Reign statistics		Notes	Ref.
No.	Champion	Date	Event	Location	Reign	Days	Notes	Ref.
1	The Super Destroyers (A. J. Petrucci and Doug Stahl)	June 23, 1992	Live event	Philadelphia, PA	1	283	Defeated Glen Osbourne and Max Thrasher in a tournament final.	
2	Tony Stetson and Larry Winters	April 2, 1993	Hardcore TV	Radnor, PA	1	1	Title change aired on May 11, 1993 via tape delay.	
3	The Suicide Blondes (Chris Candido, Johnny Hotbody, and Chris Michaels)	April 3, 1993	Hardcore TV	Philadelphia, PA	1	42	Hotbody and Candido won the belts, but all three wrestlers were recognized as champions, and were able to defend the titles in any combination via the Freebird Rule. Title change aired on May 25, 1993 via tape delay.	
4	The Super Destroyers (A. J. Petrucci and Doug Stahl)	May 15, 1993	Hardcore TV	Philadelphia, PA	2	<1	Defeated Johnny Hotbody and Chris Michaels. Title change aired on July 6, 1993 via tape delay.	
5	The Suicide Blondes (Chris Candido, Johnny Hotbody, and Chris Michaels)	May 15, 1993	Hardcore TV	Philadelphia, PA	2	61	Title change aired on July 20, 1993 via tape delay.	
—	Vacated	July 15, 1993	Hardcore TV	—	—	—	The title was vacated when Chris Candido jumped to Smoky Mountain Wrestling.	
6	The Dark Patriot and Eddie Gilbert	August 8, 1993	Hardcore TV	Philadelphia, PA	1	54	Defeated Salvatore Bellomo and The Sandman in a tournament final. Title change aired on September 7, 1993 via tape delay.	
—	Vacated	October 1, 1993	Bloodfest: Part 1	Philadelphia, PA	—	—	The title was vacated when Eddie Gilbert left ECW.	
7	Johnny Hotbody (3) and Tony Stetson (2)	October 1, 1993	Bloodfest: Part 1	Philadelphia, PA	1	43	Awarded when Eddie Gilbert no-showed the event.	
8	Tommy Dreamer and Johnny Gunn	November 13, 1993	November to Remember	Philadelphia, PA	1	21		
9	Kevin Sullivan and The Tazmaniac	December 4, 1993	Hardcore TV	Philadelphia, PA	1	63	Sullivan and Tazmaniac defeated Tommy Dreamer and Shane Douglas, who was substituting for an injured Johnny Gunn. Title change aired on December 14, 1993 via tape delay.	
—	Vacated	February 5, 1994	Live event	Philadelphia, PA	—	—	Title was held up due to controversial finish of a title defense against The Bruise Brothers.	
10	Kevin Sullivan and The Tazmaniac	March 5, 1994	Live event	Philadelphia, PA	2	1	Defeated The Bruise Brothers in a rematch.	
11	The Public Enemy (Johnny Grunge and Rocco Rock)	March 6, 1994	Hardcore TV	Philadelphia, PA	1	174	Title change aired on March 8, 1994 via tape delay.	
12	Cactus Jack and Mikey Whipwreck	August 27, 1994	NWA World Title Tournament	Philadelphia, PA	1	70	Title change aired on September 6, 1994 episode of Hardcore TV via tape delay.	
13	The Public Enemy (Johnny Grunge and Rocco Rock)	November 5, 1994	November to Remember	Philadelphia, PA	2	91	Title change aired on November 15, 1994 episode of Hardcore TV via tape delay.	
14	Dangerous Alliance (Sabu and The Tazmaniac (3))	February 4, 1995	Double Tables	Philadelphia, PA	1	21		
15	The Triple Threat (Chris Benoit and Dean Malenko)	February 25, 1995	Return of the Funker	Philadelphia, PA	1	42		
16	The Public Enemy (Johnny Grunge and Rocco Rock)	April 8, 1995	Three Way Dance	Philadelphia, PA	3	83	This was a three-way dance also involving Rick Steiner and The Tazmaniac.	
17	Raven and Stevie Richards	June 30, 1995	Mountain Top Madness	Jim Thorpe, PA	1	78	Title change aired on July 4, 1995 via tape delay.	
18	The Pitbulls (Pitbull #1 and Pitbull #2)	September 16, 1995	Gangstas Paradise	Philadelphia, PA	1	21	Title change aired on the September 19, 1995 episode of Hardcore TV via tape delay.	
19	Raven and Stevie Richards	October 7, 1995	South Philly Jam	Philadelphia, PA	2	<1	Title change aired on the October 17, 1995 episode of Hardcore TV via tape delay.	
20	The Public Enemy (Johnny Grunge and Rocco Rock)	October 7, 1995	South Philly Jam	Philadelphia, PA	4	21	This was a three-way dance also involving The Gangstas. Title change aired on the October 24, 1995 episode of Hardcore TV via tape delay.	
21	2 Cold Scorpio and The Sandman	October 28, 1995	Hardcore TV	Philadelphia, PA	1	62	Scorpio defeated Rocco Rock in a title vs. title singles match to win the tag team title and retain the ECW World Television Championship. He chose Sandman as his partner. Title change aired on November 7, 1995 via tape delay.	
22	Cactus Jack and Mikey Whipwreck	December 29, 1995	Holiday Hell	New York, NY	2	36	Whipwreck defeated 2 Cold Scorpio in a singles match to win both the tag team titles and the ECW World Television Championship; Cactus Jack came out and declared himself to be Mikey's partner after he won the match.	
23	The Eliminators (Kronus and Saturn)	February 3, 1996	Big Apple Blizzard Blast	New York, NY	1	182		
24	The Gangstas (Mustafa Saed and New Jack)	August 3, 1996	The Doctor Is In	Philadelphia, PA	1	139	This was a four-way dance, also involving The Bruise Brothers and The Samoan Gangsta Party.	
25	The Eliminators (Kronus and Saturn)	December 20, 1996	Hardcore TV	Middletown, NY	2	85	Title change aired on December 31, 1996 via tape delay.	
26	Dudley Boyz (Buh Buh Ray Dudley and D-Von Dudley)	March 15, 1997	Hostile City Showdown	Philadelphia, PA	1	29	Title change aired on March 20, 1997 episode of Hardcore TV via tape delay.	
27	The Eliminators (Kronus and Saturn)	April 13, 1997	Barely Legal	Philadelphia, PA	3	68		
28	Dudley Boyz (Buh Buh Ray Dudley and D-Von Dudley)	June 20, 1997	Hardcore TV	Waltham, MA	2	29	The Dudley Boyz defeated John Kronus in a handicap match as a result of a sidelining injury sustained by Saturn. Title change aired on June 26, 1997 via tape delay.	
29	The Gangstas (Mustafa Saed and New Jack)	July 19, 1997	Heat Wave	Philadelphia, PA	2	29	This was a steel cage match. Title change aired on July 24, 1997 episode of Hardcore TV via tape delay.	
30	Dudley Boyz (Buh Buh Ray Dudley and D-Von Dudley)	August 17, 1997	Hardcore Heaven	Fort Lauderdale, FL	3	34	The Dudley Boyz won the championship via forfeit as a result of Mustafa Saed leaving the promotion before Hardcore Heaven took place.	
31	The Gangstanators (Kronus (4) and New Jack (3))	September 20, 1997	As Good as It Gets	Philadelphia, PA	1	28	Title change aired on September 27, 1997 episode of Hardcore TV via tape delay.	
32	Full Blooded Italians (Little Guido and Tracy Smothers)	October 18, 1997	Hardcore TV	Philadelphia, PA	1	48	Title change aired on November 1, 1997 via tape delay.	
33	The Can-Am Express (Doug Furnas and Phil LaFon)	December 5, 1997	Live event	Waltham, MA	1	1		
34	Chris Candido (3) and Lance Storm	December 6, 1997	Better Than Ever	Philadelphia, PA	1	203	This was a three way dance also involving Hardcore Chair Swingin' Freaks (Axl Rotten and Balls Mahoney)	
35	Rob Van Dam and Sabu (2)	June 27, 1998	Hardcore TV	Philadelphia, PA	1	119	Title change aired on July 1, 1998 via tape delay.	
36	Dudley Boyz (Buh Buh Ray Dudley and D-Von Dudley)	October 24, 1998	Hardcore TV	Cleveland, OH	4	8	Title change aired on October 28, 1998 via tape delay.	
37	Balls Mahoney and Masato Tanaka	November 1, 1998	November to Remember	New Orleans, LA	1	5		
38	Dudley Boyz (Buh Buh Ray Dudley and D-Von Dudley)	November 6, 1998	Hardcore TV	New York, NY	5	37	Title change aired on November 13, 1998 via tape delay.	
39	Sabu (3) and Rob Van Dam	December 13, 1998	ECW/FMW Supershow II	Tokyo, Japan	2	125	Title change aired on December 16, 1998 episode of Hardcore TV via tape delay.	
40	Dudley Boyz (Buh Buh Ray Dudley and D-Von Dudley)	April 17, 1999	Hardcore TV	Buffalo, NY	6	92	D-Von Dudley defeated Rob Van Dam in a singles match to win the championship for his team. Title change aired on April 23, 1999 via tape delay.	
41	Spike Dudley and Balls Mahoney (2)	July 18, 1999	Heat Wave	Dayton, OH	1	26		
42	Dudley Boyz (Buh Buh Ray Dudley and D-Von Dudley)	August 13, 1999	Hardcore TV	Cleveland, OH	7	1	Title change aired on August 20, 1999 via tape delay.	
43	Spike Dudley and Balls Mahoney (3)	August 14, 1999	Hardcore TV	Toledo, OH	2	12	Title change aired on August 27, 1999 via tape delay.	
44	Dudley Boyz (Buh Buh Ray Dudley and D-Von Dudley)	August 26, 1999	The Last Show at the Madhouse	New York, NY	8	<1	Title change aired on ECW on TNN on September 3, 1999 via tape delay.	
45	Tommy Dreamer (2) and Raven (3)	August 26, 1999	The Last Show at the Madhouse	New York, NY	1	136	Title change aired on ECW on TNN on September 3, 1999 via tape delay.	
46	The Impact Players (Justin Credible and Lance Storm (2))	January 9, 2000	Guilty as Charged	Birmingham, AL	1	48		
47	Tommy Dreamer (3) and Masato Tanaka (2)	February 26, 2000	Hardcore TV	Cincinnati, OH	1	7	Title change aired on March 7, 2000 via tape delay.	
48	Mike Awesome and Raven (4)	March 4, 2000	ECW on TNN	Philadelphia, PA	1	8	Title change aired on March 10, 2000 via tape delay.	
49	The Impact Players (Justin Credible (2) and Lance Storm (3))	March 12, 2000	Living Dangerously	Danbury, CT	2	41	This was a three-way dance also involving Tommy Dreamer and Masato Tanaka.	
—	Vacated	April 22, 2000	CyberSlam	Philadelphia, PA	—	—	The title was vacated after Justin Credible threw down the titles before challenging Tommy Dreamer for the ECW World Heavyweight Championship.	
50	Unholy Alliance; Yoshihiro Tajiri and Mikey Whipwreck (3)	August 25, 2000	Midtown Massacre	New York, NY	1	1	This was a three-way dance also involving Tommy Dreamer and Jerry Lynn and Simon Diamond and Johnny Swinger. Title change aired on September 1, 2000 on ECW on TNN via tape delay.	
51	Full Blooded Italians (Little Guido (2) and Tony Mamaluke)	August 26, 2000	Midtown Massacre	New York, NY	1	99	Title change aired on September 8, 2000 on ECW on TNN via tape delay.	
52	Danny Doring and Roadkill	December 3, 2000	Massacre on 34th Street	New York, NY	1	128		
—	Deactivated	April 11, 2001	—	—	—	—	Abandoned when the promotion closed.	

== Combined reigns ==
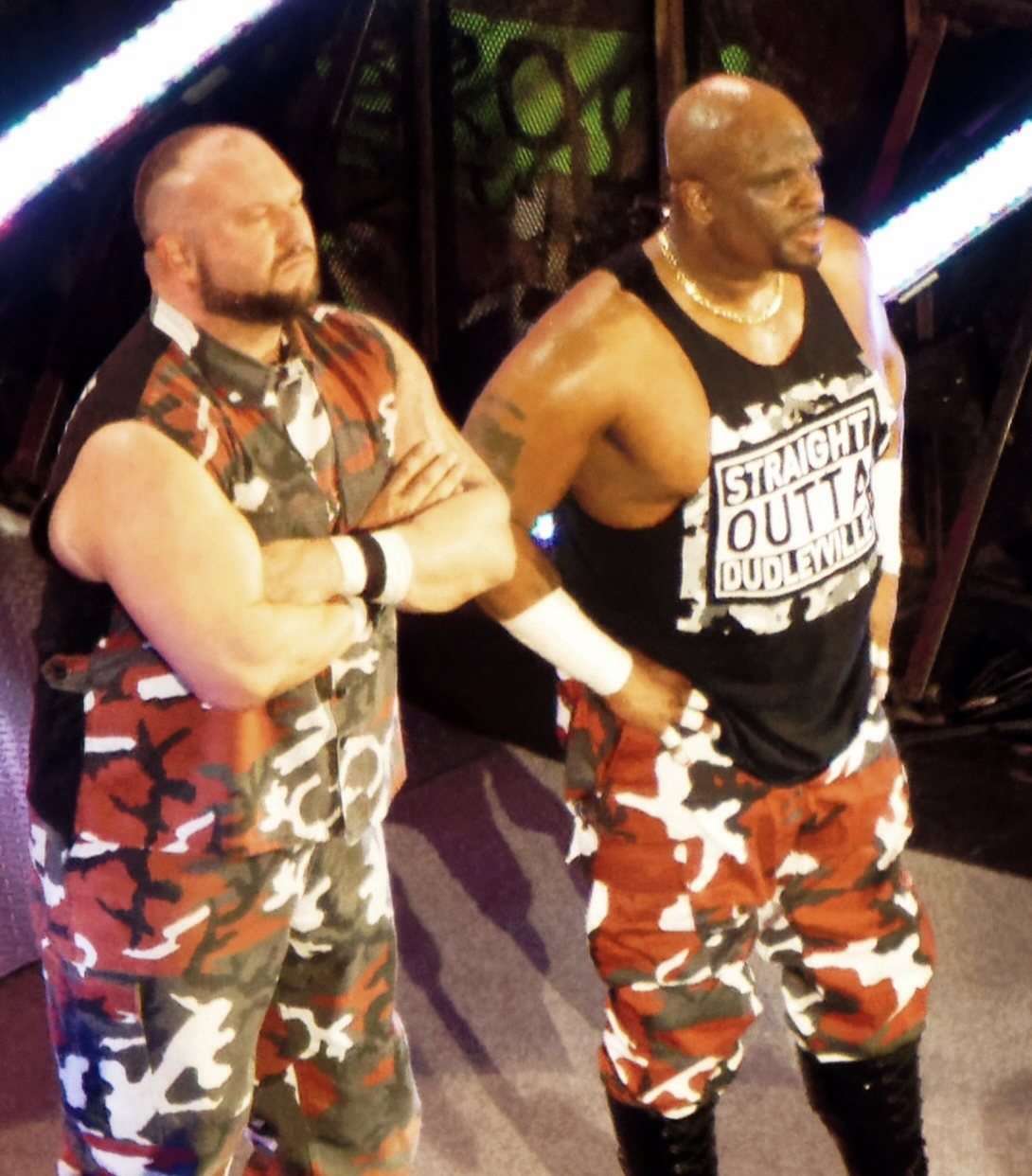
The Dudley Boyz had eight reigns as tag team champions, the most in the title history

=== By team ===
Rank	Team	No. of reigns	Combined days
1	Johnny Grunge and Rocco Rock (The Public Enemy)	4	369
2	Kronus and Saturn (The Eliminators)	3	335
3	A. J. Petrucci and Doug Stahl (The Super Destroyers)	2	283
4	Sabu and Rob Van Dam	2	244
5	Buh Buh Ray and D-Von (Dudley Boyz)	8	230
6	Chris Candido and Lance Storm	1	203
7	Mustafa Saed and New Jack (The Gangstas)	2	168
8	Tommy Dreamer and Raven	1	136
9	Danny Doring and Roadkill	1	129
10	Cactus Jack and Mikey Whipwreck	2	106
11	Little Guido and Tony Mamaluke (Full Blooded Italians)	1	99
12	Chris Candido, Johnny Hotbody, and Chris Michaels (The Suicide Blondes)	2	88
13	Justin Credible and Lance Storm (The Impact Players)	2	79
14	Raven and Stevie Richards	2	78
15	Kevin Sullivan and The Tazmaniac	2	64
16	2 Cold Scorpio and The Sandman	1	62
17	The Dark Patriot and Eddie Gilbert	1	54
18	Little Guido and Tracy Smothers (Full Blooded Italians)	1	48
19	Johnny Hotbody and Tony Stetson	1	43
20	Chris Benoit and Dean Malenko	1	42
21	Spike Dudley and Balls Mahoney	2	38
22	Kronus and New Jack (The Gangstanators)	1	28
23	Tommy Dreamer and Johnny Gunn	1	21
23	Sabu and The Tazmaniac	1	21
23	Pitbull #1 and Pitbull #2 (The Pitbulls)	1	21
26	Mike Awesome and Raven	1	8
27	Tommy Dreamer and Masato Tanaka	1	7
28	Balls Mahoney and Masato Tanaka	1	5
29	Tony Stetson and Larry Winters	1	1
29	Doug Furnas and Phil LaFon	1	1
29	Yoshihiro Tajiri and Mikey Whipwreck	1	1

=== By wrestler ===
Rank	Wrestler	No. of reigns	Combined days
1	Johnny Grunge	4	369
1	Rocco Rock	4	369
3	Kronus	4	363
4	Saturn	3	335
5	Chris Candido	3	291
6	A. J. Petrucci	2	283
6	Doug Stahl	2	283
8	Lance Storm	3	282
9	Sabu	3	265
10	Rob Van Dam	2	244
11	Buh Buh Ray Dudley	8	230
11	D-Von Dudley	8	230
13	Raven	4	222
14	New Jack	3	196
15	Mustafa Saed	2	168
16	Tommy Dreamer	3	164
17	Little Guido	2	149
18	Johnny Hotbody	3	131
19	Roadkill	1	129
19	Danny Doring	1	129
21	Mikey Whipwreck	3	107
22	Cactus Jack	2	106
23	Tony Mamaluke	1	99
24	Kevin Sullivan	1	64
25	Chris Michaels	2	88
26	The Tazmaniac	3	84
27	Justin Credible	2	79
28	Stevie Richards	2	78
29	The Sandman	1	62
29	2 Cold Scorpio	1	62
31	Eddie Gilbert	1	54
31	The Dark Patriot	1	54
33	Tracy Smothers	1	48
34	Tony Stetson	2	44
35	Balls Mahoney	3	43
36	Chris Benoit	1	42
36	Dean Malenko	1	42
38	Spike Dudley	2	38
39	Johnny Gunn	1	21
39	Pitbull #1	1	21
39	Pitbull #2	1	21
42	Masato Tanaka	2	12
43	Mike Awesome	1	8
44	Larry Winters	1	1
44	Doug Furnas	1	1
44	Phil LaFon	1	1
44	Yoshihiro Tajiri	1	1
