= Suicide Blondes =

Suicide Blondes can mean:

- The tag team later known as Edge and Christian.
- The tag team/stable consisting of Chris Candido, Johnny Hotbody and Chris Michaels.
- Suicide Blondes, the tag team of LuFisto and Jennifer Blake
