= Don E. Allen =

American professional wrestler

Personal information
- Born: Don Adelberg Philadelphia, Pennsylvania, U.S.

Professional wrestling career
- Ring name(s): Don E. Allen; Donn E. Allen
- Billed height: 5 ft 10 in (178 cm)
- Billed weight: 187 lb (85 kg)
- Trained by: Joey Maggs; Larry Winters; Rockin' Rebel; Ron Shaw
- Debut: 1989
- Retired: June 18, 2011

Don Adelberg is an American professional wrestler, better known by the ring name Don E. Allen (sometimes spelled Donn E. Allen). He is best known for his appearances with the Philadelphia, Pennsylvania-based promotion Eastern Championship Wrestling/Extreme Championship Wrestling from 1992 to 1996.

== Professional wrestling career ==
=== Early career (1989–1992) ===
Adelberg was trained to wrestle by Joey Maggs, Larry Winters, Rockin' Rebel, and Ron Shaw. He debuted in 1989. He made several appearances with the Philadelphia-based Tri-State Wrestling Alliance as "Don E. Allen".

=== Eastern Championship Wrestling / Extreme Championship Wrestling (1992–1996) ===
In April 1992, Allen began appearing with the Philadelphia-based promotion Eastern Championship Wrestling (the successor to the Tri-State Wrestling Alliance). He made his first appearance at Terror at Tabor, competing in a battle royal as part of a tournament to crown the inaugural ECW Heavyweight Champion. At ECW's first supercard, the June 1993 Super Summer Sizzler Spectacular, Allen wrestled Herve Renesto to a no contest in the opening bout. Allen and Renesto went to form a short-lived tag team named "Twisted Steel & Sex Appeal". At UltraClash in September 1993, Allen participated in an intergender battle royal. The following month, at the weekend event NWA Bloodfest, he lost to Rockin' Rebel on the first night and then teamed with Chad Austin in a loss to The Bad Breed on the second night. Throughout late-1993 and 1994, Allen competed on the undercard, making regular appearances on ECW Hardcore TV. In addition to wrestling, Allen fulfilled various backstage roles for ECW.

In August 1994, Eastern Championship Wrestling was renamed Extreme Championship Wrestling, with the promotion adopting an "edgier" direction. Allen was booked as a jobber, rarely scoring victories. Beginning in September 1994, he began occasionally teaming with Dino Sandoff, with the duo elevating wrestlers such as Dean Malenko and Taz by facing them in handicap matches. At Holiday Hell in December 1994, Allen lost to Mikey Whipwreck. Allen was ranked the 500th top wrestler worldwide in the Pro Wrestling Illustrated "PWI 500" ranking for 1994; Allen stated that he "got more publicity and bookings from that one story than nearly any time in my career".

Allen continued performing as a jobber in 1995. At Hardcore Heaven in July 1995, a tag team match pitting Allen and Sandoff against The Broad Street Bully and Chad Austin was declared a no contest after 911 came to the ring and chokeslammed all the competitors. At Heatwave '95: Rage in the Cage! later that month, Allen and Tony Stetson challenged Raven and Stevie Richards for the ECW World Heavyweight Championship; they scored an upset victory by count out (meaning the Championship did not change hands) after Raven and Richards left the ring to break-up a fight between Raven's valet Beulah McGillicutty and Richards' admirer Francine at ringside, only for Raven and Richards to beat them down afterwards. At Gangstas Paradise in September, Allen and Chad Austin lost to the Dudley Brothers. At November to Remember, Allen was scheduled to face the Broad Street Bully, only for guest ring announcer Buh Buh Ray Dudley to become frustrated when he stuttered while giving the ring introductions and powerbomb both men, resulting in a no contest.

At CyberSlam in February 1996, Allen teamed with Dino Sandoff and The Dirtbike Kid in a loss to The Bad Crew and Judge Dredd. At Fight the Power in June 1996, Allen was one of several undercard wrestlers to unsuccessfully challenge ECW World Television Champion Shane Douglas. In August 1996 at The Doctor Is In, Allen, The Blue Meanie, Super Nova, and Stevie Richards participated in a parody of the band Kiss (with Allen dressing as Peter Criss), lip synching and miming to the Kiss song "Rock and Roll All Nite" until The Sandman came to the ring and caned them.

=== Late career (1996–present) ===
Allen ceased appearing regularly with ECW in mid-1996. In the late-1990s, Allen appeared with the Swarthmore, Pennsylvania-based All American Wrestling promotion, where he held the AAW Pennsylvania State Heavyweight Championship. In June 1998, he made a one-off return to ECW, wrestling the Equalizer to a no contest at a house show in Philadelphia. He went on to appear with various independent promotions in Pennsylvania, including Pro-Pain-Pro Wrestling, American Championship Pro Wrestling, and the revived Tri-State Wrestling Alliance. In June 2005, he appeared at the ECW reunion show Hardcore Homecoming. He wrestled his final match on June 18, 2011.

== Professional wrestling style and persona ==
Allen used the nicknames "Devious" Don E. Allen and "the Devious One". He used the Oklahoma roll, the inside cradle, and the "rolling necksnapper" as finishing moves.

== Championships and accomplishments ==
- All American Wrestling
  - AAW Pennsylvania State Heavyweight Championship (1 time)
- American Championship Pro Wrestling
  - ACPW American Television Championship (1 time)
  - ACPW Internet Television Championship (1 time)
  - ACPW Junior Heavyweight Championship (1 time)
