= November to Remember (1995) =

1995 Extreme Championship Wrestling supercard event

- The ECW Arena.
- Promotion: Extreme Championship Wrestling
- Date: November 18, 1995
- City: Philadelphia, Pennsylvania, US
- Venue: ECW Arena
- Attendance: 1,150

Event chronology
| ← Previous; South Philly Jam | Next → December to Dismember |

November to Remember chronology
| ← Previous; 1994 | Next → 1996 |

November to Remember (1995) was the third November to Remember professional wrestling event produced by Extreme Championship Wrestling (ECW). The event took place on November 18, 1995 in the ECW Arena in Philadelphia, Pennsylvania in the United States. The event marked the return of Sabu to ECW after a stint in World Championship Wrestling (WCW) and the ECW debut of The Blue Meanie.

Nine professional wrestling matches were contested at the event. The main event was a tag team match, in which Terry Funk and Tommy Dreamer took on Raven and Cactus Jack. Featured matches on the undercard were Mikey Whipwreck versus Steve Austin for the ECW World Heavyweight Championship, The Sandman and 2 Cold Scorpio versus The Public Enemy (Rocco Rock and Johnny Grunge) for the ECW World Television Championship and the ECW World Tag Team Championship and Rey Misterio Jr. versus Psicosis in a Mexican death match.

== Storylines ==
The event featured wrestlers from pre-existing scripted feuds and storylines. Wrestlers portrayed villains, heroes, or less distinguishable characters in the scripted events that built tension and culminated in a wrestling match or series of matches played out on ECW's television program Hardcore TV.

Tommy Dreamer had been involved in a feud with Raven since the summer of 1995. At Wrestlepalooza, Dreamer Cactus Jack and The Pitbulls (Pitbull #1 and Pitbull #2) took on Raven, Stevie Richards, Big Dick Dudley and Dudley Dudley in an eight-man tag team match, during which Jack turned on Dreamer by hitting him with a DDT and allowed Raven to pin him. Jack switched his allegiance to Raven and joined Raven's Nest, thus joining him in his feud with Dreamer. Jack renounced the hardcore wrestling style of ECW and criticized the fans and Dreamer for enjoying it. At Gangstas Paradise, Dreamer interfered in Raven and Richards' title defense of the World Tag Team Championship against Pitbulls in a two out of three falls match and took the injured Pitbull #2's place to pin Raven. However, Bill Alfonso overturned the decision and tried to award the win to Raven and Richards but ECW commissioner Tod Gordon came and restarted the match. Pitbulls went on to win the World Tag Team Championship. On the October 10 episode of Hardcore TV, Dreamer attempted to make the save for El Puerto Riqueño, who was being attacked by Raven and Jack after Jack had beaten Riqueño in a match. However, Dreamer was double teamed and Jack drove him through a table with a diving elbow drop with barbed wire around his elbow. On the November 14 episode of Hardcore TV, Dreamer and Jack had a match against each other, in which Raven interfered and both men attacked Dreamer until Terry Funk made the save for Dreamer, leading to a match between the two teams at November to Remember.

On the August 22 episode of Hardcore TV, Mikey Whipwreck defeated the World Heavyweight Champion The Sandman in a non-title Singapore Cane match. At Gangstas Paradise, Whipwreck and The Public Enemy (Rocco Rock and Johnny Grunge) defeated 2 Cold Scorpio, New Jack and The Sandman in a Gangstas Paradise Cage match when Whipwreck pinned Sandman again. On the September 26 episode of Hardcore TV, former World Championship Wrestling talent Steve Austin made his ECW debut and set his sights on the World Heavyweight Championship, thus inserting himself into Whipwreck and Sandman's feud over the title. On the October 17 episode of Hardcore TV, Raven and Stevie Richards regained the World Tag Team Championship from The Pitbulls. The following week, on Hardcore TV, Public Enemy defeated Raven and Richards and The Gangstas (New Jack and Mustafa Saed) in a three-way dance to win the title. On the October 31 episode of Hardcore TV, Whipwreck defeated Sandman in a ladder match to win the World Heavyweight Championship. Scorpio defeated Rocco Rock in a singles match to retain the World Television Championship while also winning the World Tag Team Championship. He chose Sandman as his tag team partner. Later that night, it was announced that Scorpio and Sandman would defend both titles against Public Enemy at November to Remember and the winner of the fall would earn a title shot against Whipwreck later at the event.

Rey Misterio, Jr. and Psicosis made their ECW debut in a match against each other at Gangstas Paradise, which Misterio won. On the October 17 episode of Hardcore TV, Psicosis defeated Misterio in a two out of three falls match. On the November 14 episode of Hardcore TV, Konnan and Misterio defeated Psicosis and La Parka by count-out in a tag team match. This would lead to a Mexican Death match between Misterio and Psicosis at November to Remember.

== Event ==
=== Preliminary matches ===
The opening match of the event pitted The Broad Street Bully against Don E. Allen, with Buh Buh Ray Dudley as the special guest ring announcer for the match. After Dudley repeatedly stuttered while giving the introduction, he became frustrated and attacked both men, powerbombing Allen and then Bully before pinning Bully. After the match, Paul Heyman came to the ring and the lights of the arena went off and as the lights came back, Sabu was present in the ring, thus making his return to ECW.

The match was followed by Konnan taking on Jason. The injured Taz came to the ring as the special guest referee. Jason insulted Taz, so he attacked him and Konnan nailed a Splash Mountain to Jason for the win with Taz making a fast pinfall count.

Next, Stevie Richards took on El Puerto Riqueño. During the match, The Blue Meanie debuted in ECW as a fan in the audience who gave a present to Richards and Richards brought him to ringside. Riqueño hit a Plancha to Richards outside the ring and then tossed him into the ring for a springboard moonsault. He followed with a missile dropkick to Richards and nailed Meanie with a suicide dive. Riqueño then climbed the top rope but Richards hit him in the crotch and dropped him on the mat with a Powerbomb and then dropped Riqueño in the ropes with a Gourdbuster. He powerbombed Riqueño and forced Meanie to come into the ring and climb to the top rope where Meanie attempted a Meaniesault but missed it. Richards then nailed Riqueño with a Stevie Kick to win the match.

Later, The Pitbulls (Pitbull #1 and Pitbull #2) took on The Eliminators (Saturn and Kronus). Both teams exchanged moves until everyone got involved including Eliminators' manager Jason, who hit a leg drop on Pitbull #2. This allowed Eliminators to gain momentum. Pitbull #2 eventually hit a spin kick to Kronus and Pitbull #1 nailed a clothesline and the Pitbulls delivered a superbomb to Kronus for the win. After the match, Jason tried to force Pitbulls' manager Francine to go out with him, leading to Pitbull #1 hitting him with a chair. Saturn attacked Pitbulls and then Eliminators delivered Total Elimination to both Pitbulls.

The following match was a Mexican Death match featuring Rey Misterio, Jr. against Psicosis. Psicosis attempted a corner dropkick to his opponent but missed it and Misterio hit a hurricanrana. Both men executed several moves in attempt to knock each other down until Misterio hit a springboard moonsault on Psicosis into the crowd. The two brawled with each other into the crowd until Misterio hit a hurricanrana off the balcony onto the bird's nest and Psicosis was knocked out. Misterio then returned to the ring while Psicosis was unable to come back and therefore Misterio won the match. After the match, Jason offered Misterio his managerial services which he declined and then hit a spinning heel kick to Misterio due to Jason insulting him and then Eliminators attacked him until 911 made the save by chokeslamming Eliminators.

The Sandman and 2 Cold Scorpio defended the World Tag Team Championship against The Public Enemy (Rocco Rock and Johnny Grunge), with Scorpio's World Television Championship also on the line. The person who would score the pinfall would earn a title shot at Mikey Whipwreck for the World Heavyweight Championship later at the event. Public Enemy attempted a Drive-By on Sandman but Sandman ducked it and Rock accidentally nailed Grunge with the Drive-By and Sandman fell on Grunge to retain the World Tag Team Championship. As a result, Sandman became the #1 contender for the World Heavyweight Championship later at the event. It was followed by Axl Rotten defeating J.T. Smith.

Bill Alfonso took on Tod Gordon, with Beulah McGillicutty as the special guest referee. Alfonso attacked Gordon on the floor before the match started and nailed McGillicutty with a clothesline. Both men went back and forth against each other until Gordon nailed Alfonso with a frying pan and covered him for the pinfall. With McGillicutty knocked out, Taz came to officiate the match and then he turned on Gordon by punching him and put Alfonso on top of him and covered the pinfall, thus awarding the victory to Alfonso. After the match, Taz officially turned heel and cut a promo in which he berated Paul Heyman and the fans for not supporting him sending him letters when he was injured.

In the next match, Mikey Whipwreck was supposed to defend the World Heavyweight Championship against The Sandman but Steve Austin attacked Sandman before the match and repeatedly assaulted him with a Singapore cane and proceeded to nail a Stun Gun to Sandman to injure him and then took his place into the match against Whipwreck. Austin executed a Stun Gun but got a near-fall and then Whipwreck pinned him with a sunset flip to retain the title. After the match, Austin hit a lariat to Whipwreck.

The penultimate match of the event featured Sabu in his comeback match in ECW against Hack Myers. Sabu dominated the entire match and then drove him through a table with a somersault plancha placing a chair beneath him outside the ring. The action then returned to the ring, where Sabu nailed an Arabian Facebuster for the win.

=== Main event match ===
The team of Terry Funk and Tommy Dreamer took on Raven's Nest members Raven and Cactus Jack in the main event. Raven and Cactus prevented Dreamer and Funk from entering the ring to start. They managed to enter the ring and both teams brawled with each other using various weapons against each other and brawling throughout the floor. Funk knocked out the referee by nailing him with a dust pan and both teams continued their fight which turned out to be a brutal and vicious brawl. Cactus eventually hit a double arm DDT to Funk on a chair and Raven knocked out Dreamer with a springboard senton outside the ring. Bill Alfonso and Taz interfered in the match by attacking Funk but Dreamer prevented them from attacking him, allowing Raven to attack him from behind. Taz and Alfonso left while Dreamer drove Raven with two DDTs and Funk hit a Piledriver to Raven on a steel chair to win the match. Both teams continued to brawl with each other after the match.

== Reception ==
November to Remember largely received positive reviews from critics. Dylan Diot of 411Mania rated the event 7 out of 10, stating "This show is widely regarded as one of the best shows in the history of the promotion.", with "It was a collection of fun ECW brawls but nothing was blow away. However, this show has huge historical significance in the landscape of ECW. We had the return of Sabu from WCW, the heel turn of Taz that gave him the human submission machine gimmick, the early stages of the B.W.O, and the early emergence of future megastars in the sport such as Steve Austin and Rey Mysterio. This is one of ECW's must watch events regardless of the quality, which is solid but nothing spectacular. I say this show is worth a look and is a good example of how hot the company was at the time and how influence they ended up in the landscape of pro wrestling." The heel turn of Taz and his promo after the Bill Alfonso and Tod Gordon's match was considered as a very important angle in the history of ECW and was a huge evolution in Taz's character. Most of the matches were praised by Diot.

Arnold Furious of Wrestling Recaps panned the event. He praised the Mexican Death match and the main event tag team match, while criticizing the rest of the matches. He panned the booking style of Tod Gordon. He stated "It was the ideas that made ECW so interesting. The wrestling only really kicked in later. So in wrestling terms this show is nothing remarkable. It was great at the time because it was different and innovative but time isn’t kind to it. Recommendation to avoid."

Scott Keith of 411Mania wrote "Best ECW show ever, and it stacks up against the best shows the Big Two put out in the same timeframe, and pretty much kills them in fact. For those who wondered why people used to swear by ECW so much, this is the show to get to see why. The perfect blend of “sports entertainment”, senseless brawling, high-flying lucha and some decent wrestling to fill in the other spots."

Wrestling 20 Years Ago staff gave it a score rating of 8.5 out of 10 and opined that "The early action is, if nothing else, brief and there's no bad match from The Eliminators and The Pitbulls onwards. The perfect variety show."

== Aftermath ==
The feud between Mikey Whipwreck and Steve Austin over the ECW World Heavyweight Championship continued after November to Remember. At December to Dismember, The Sandman defeated Whipwreck and Austin in a three-way dance to win the World Heavyweight Championship.

The feud between Tommy Dreamer and Raven continued as the team of Tommy Dreamer, The Public Enemy and The Pitbulls defeated Raven, The Heavenly Bodies, The Eliminators and Stevie Richards in an Ultimate Jeopardy Steel Cage match at December to Dismember.

== Results ==
| No. | Results | Stipulations | Times |
|---|---|---|---|
| 1 | Don E. Allen vs. The Broad Street Bully ended in a no contest | Singles match | 1:16 |
| 2 | Buh Buh Ray Dudley (with Big Dick Dudley, Chubby Dudley, Sign Guy Dudley and Dances with Dudley) defeated The Broad Street Bully | Singles match | 0:57 |
| 3 | Konnan defeated Jason | Singles match with Taz as special guest referee | 0:14 |
| 4 | Stevie Richards (with The Blue Meanie) defeated El Puerto Riqueño | Singles match | 3:03 |
| 5 | The Pitbulls (Pitbull #1 and Pitbull #2) (with Francine) defeated The Eliminators (Saturn and Kronus) (with Jason) | Tag team match | 11:00 |
| 6 | Rey Misterio, Jr. defeated Psicosis | Mexican death match | 14:47 |
| 7 | 2 Cold Scorpio and The Sandman (c) (with Woman) defeated The Public Enemy (Rocco Rock and Johnny Grunge) | Tag team match for the ECW World Television and the ECW World Tag Team Championships | 16:03 |
| 8 | Axl Rotten defeated J.T. Smith | Singles match | — |
| 9 | Bill Alfonso defeated Tod Gordon | Singles match with Beulah McGillicutty as special guest referee | 6:37 |
| 10 | Mikey Whipwreck (c) defeated Steve Austin | Singles match for the ECW World Heavyweight Championship | 4:38 |
| 11 | Sabu defeated Hack Meyers | Singles match | 12:55 |
| 12 | Terry Funk and Tommy Dreamer defeated Raven and Cactus Jack | Tag team match | 13:36 |
(c) / – the champion(s) heading into the match

== See also ==
- 1995 in professional wrestling
