= Tony Stetson =

American professional wrestler (born 1959)

Personal information
- Born: Anthony Matteo; March 21, 1959 (age 67) Philadelphia, Pennsylvania, U.S.
- Children: 3

Professional wrestling career
- Ring name(s): The Broad Street Bully; Tony Matteo; Tony Stetson
- Billed height: 5 ft 10 in (1.78 m)
- Billed weight: 238 lb (108 kg; 17.0 st)
- Billed from: South Philadelphia, Pennsylvania, U.S.
- Trained by: Larry Sharpe
- Debut: December 9, 1985
- Retired: 2015

Anthony Matteo (born March 21, 1959) is an American professional wrestler, better known by his ring name, "Hitman" Tony Stetson. He is best known for his time in Extreme Championship Wrestling (ECW) during the 1990s.

Stetson was one of ECW's initial stars, appearing at the company's first event in 1992. He quickly rose to success as a tag team competitor, winning the promotion's Tag Team Championship twice while also achieving singles success by winning the Pennsylvania Heavyweight Championship during his career. He later joined Raven's Nest and adopted a character called The Broad Street Bully.

== Early life ==
Matteo grew up on the corner of at South 11th Street and West Ritner Street in South Philadelphia. He attended Saint John Neumann High School.

== Professional wrestling career ==
=== Early career ===
Matteo trained as a professional wrestler at Larry Sharpe's Monster Factory in Burlington County. Stetson would eventually debut in 1985 facing fellow Monster Factory alumni Bam Bam Bigelow at a World Wrestling Federation television taping at the Mid-Hudson Civic Center in Poughkeepsie, New York, on December 9, 1985. Matteo originally wrestled as "Tony Matteo", adopting the ring name "Tony Stetson" after overhearing color commentator Bruno Sammartino mispronounce his name.

=== Tri-State Wrestling Alliance ===
Tony Stetson made a name for himself wrestling in Joel Goodhart's Tri-State Wrestling Alliance as well as other promotions in Pennsylvania and New Jersey from the mid-1980s through the mid-1990s. He employed a hardcore wrestling style and was an early contributor to the Philadelphia wrestling scene, including his feud with Johnny Hotbody. Stetson and Hotbody traded wins in a variety of matches, including a Taped Fist First Blood match on March 31, 1990. Several months later, Stetson defeated Hotbody in a Hair vs Hair match. On March 2, 1991, the two resumed their feud when Stetson won a Barbed wire match. When Stetson first started in the Business, he had a manager who went by the name of "The Godfather". The Godfather, was later known as "The Equalizer" and then ended his career as "Gianni Corleone" while working with Stetson toward the end of his career in the CWC.

=== Eastern/Extreme Championship Wrestling ===
==== Tag team competition and championship reigns (1992–1994) ====
Stetson joined the upstart National Wrestling Alliance (NWA) promotion Eastern Championship Wrestling (ECW) in 1992, where he was one of the company's first stars along with Rockin' Rebel, J.T. Smith, Glen Osbourne, The Sandman, Max Thrasher, and Jimmy Jannetty. The company was a successor to Tri-State Wrestling Alliance. Matteo competed as a fan favorite at the company's first event Market Street Mayhem on February 25, 1992, where he defeated Ivan Koloff. The following month, in March, he lost to Koloff in a Russian deathmatch. He was involved in many high-profile rivalries with the company's top stars throughout the year, making a name for himself during the initial days of ECW. His first success came when he began teaming with Larry Winters on December 19, where the duo lost their match due to interference by the Tag Team Champions The Super Destroyers. As a result, Stetson and Winters began feuding with Super Destroyers for the Tag Team Championship, with the former defeating the Super Destroyers to win the tag titles on the May 11, 1993, episode of NWA Eastern Championship Wrestling. Stetson and Winters lost the titles to The Suicide Blondes (Chris Candido and Johnny Hotbody) on the May 25 episode of Eastern Championship Wrestling. On the June 8 episode of Eastern Championship Wrestling, Stetson turned on Winters during a 16-man battle royal for the new Pennsylvania Heavyweight Championship, thus becoming a villain. Stetson defeated Winters in a first blood match at Super Summer Sizzler Spectacular on June 19.

Stetson moved on to singles competition, during which he defeated Tommy Cairo to win the Pennsylvania Heavyweight Championship on the September 14 episode of Eastern Championship Wrestling. Stetson successfully defended the title against Cairo at UltraClash. The title was neither defended nor mentioned on television again, thus being retired with Stetson as the final champion. The following month, Stetson began teaming with Johnny Hotbody when duo were awarded the Tag Team Championship at NWA Bloodfest: Part 1 on October 1, after the title was vacated due to Eddie Gilbert and The Dark Patriot (Eddie's brother Doug Gilbert) quitting the company. They made successful title defenses against Badd Company, The Sandman and J.T. Smith and The Bad Breed before dropping them to the team of Tommy Dreamer and Johnny Gunn at November to Remember.

In 1994, Stetson made only one televised appearance on the March 8 episode of Eastern Championship Wrestling, where he teamed with Johnny Hotbody against Bad Breed in a losing effort. He went on a hiatus and returned to the renamed Extreme Championship Wrestling at a live event on September 30, where he was pinned by Tommy Dreamer.

==== The Broad Street Bully (1995–1996) ====
In February 1995 at Return of the Funker, Stetson and his tag team partner Johnny Hotbody joined the Raven's Nest group after Raven made his ECW debut and their tag team was named "The Broad Street Bullies", a reference to the Philadelphia Flyers ice hockey team. At Three Way Dance on April 8, the Bullies were defeated by The Pitbulls in a match which stipulated that Bullies would be fired by Raven's Nest should they lose. As a result, Stetson reverted to being a fan favorite. He continued to develop his "Broad Street Bully" character as he began wearing a hockey jersey and gloves and carrying a hockey stick to the ring. At Barbed Wire, Hoodies & Chokeslams, Broad Street Bully defeated The Jersey Devil in a quick match, avenging the Philadelphia Flyers' upset elimination from the 1995 Stanley Cup by the New Jersey Devils. Matteo reprised the Broad Street Bully character at Hardcore Heaven and November to Remember, both events took place in Philadelphia.

Matteo continued to perform as Tony Stetson and feuded with Raven's Nest following the events of Three Way Dance, once challenging Raven and Stevie Richards for the ECW World Tag Team Championship alongside Don E. Allen at Heatwave '95: Rage in the Cage!, where Matteo's team won by countout, meaning Raven and Richards retained the titles. Stetson competed as a mid-card wrestler for the remainder of the year, suffering losses to Hack Myers, Val Puccio, Bull Pain and JT Smith before departing the company in 1996, ending his four year-run with ECW. His last match took place at the House Party event, where he teamed with JT Smith against The Bad Crew in a tag team match, which ended in a no contest.

=== Later career ===
Going into semi-retirement by the mid-1990s, Stetson worked coordinating supply distribution for Methodist Hospital. In 1999, he joined promoter Lisa Constantino's Central Wrestling Coalition based in South Philadelphia. Teaming up with his old Manager Gianni Corleone (also known as "The Godfather" and The Equalizer early in his career), he feuded with Breaker Morant over the CWC Heavyweight Championship during the next two years in the promotion.

Stetson retired in 2002 after accumulating a number of nagging injuries. He returned to wrestling in 2009, facing Breaker Morant at a TWA reunion show. In the same year, he served as a consultant for the production "The Elaborate Entrance of Chad Deity" by the InterAct Theatre Company. He retired from wrestling in 2015.

== Personal life ==
Stetson is married with three children. He is an Italian American.

== Championships and accomplishments ==
- Eastern Championship Wrestling
  - ECW Tag Team Championship (2 times) - with Larry Winters (1) and Johnny Hotbody (1)
  - NWA Pennsylvania Heavyweight Championship (1 time)
- Hardcore Hall of Fame
  - Class of 2025
- Pro Wrestling Illustrated
  - PWI ranked him #433 of the top 500 singles wrestlers in the PWI 500 in 2010
- Tri-State Wrestling Alliance
  - TWA Bar Wars Championship (1 time)
- World Wrestling Association
  - WWA Junior Heavyweight Championship (1 time)
