= NWA Bloodfest =

Wrestling event

- The ECW Arena.
- Promotion: Eastern Championship Wrestling
- Date: October 1, 1993; October 2, 1993 (aired October 5 to November 9, 1993)
- City: Philadelphia, Pennsylvania, US
- Venue: ECW Arena
- Attendance: c. 250 (night one) c. 400 (night two)

Event chronology
← Previous; UltraClash	Next → Terror at Tabor

NWA Bloodfest was a professional wrestling live event produced by the National Wrestling Alliance (NWA) affiliate Eastern Championship Wrestling (ECW) on October 1 and October 2, 1993. The event was held in the ECW Arena in Philadelphia, Pennsylvania in the United States.

NWA Bloodfest was the second ECW event to be produced by Paul Heyman, who had taken over booking of the promotion from Tod Gordon earlier that year. The commentator for the event was Joey Styles, whose commentary was added following the event in post-production. Excerpts from the event aired on episodes #26 to #31 of ECW Hardcore TV, ECW's syndicated television program, in October and November 1993.

The event saw the debut of Sabu, the Tazmaniac (the future "Taz"), and Tommy Dreamer - all of who would go on to be ECW mainstays - as well as the Bad Breed. Heyman used the event to catapult Sabu to the top of the promotion. On the first night, Sabu defeated the Tazmaniac; he was led to the ring on a gurney wearing chains to establish his character. During the match, Sabu's "daredevil tactics" won him the favor of the ECW crowd. On the second night, Sabu defeated Shane Douglas for the ECW World Heavyweight Championship. Heyman also used the event to build sympathy for Tommy Dreamer by having him repeatedly kick-out before being pinned by The Tazmaniac.

NWA Bloodfest has been described as marking the onset of the "more darkly violent direction" for ECW under Heyman's leadership. Heyman used the event to condition the audience to accept that "there really are no bad guys or good guys", noting "in every segment the guy that they didn't want to win won".

== Part one ==
=== Event ===
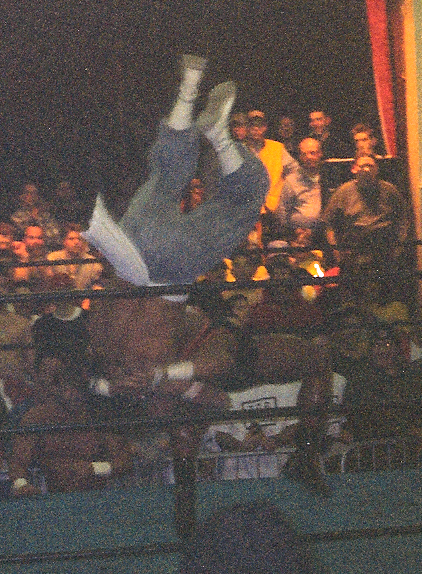
Sabu (top) and The Tazmaniac (bottom) (pictured in 1997) debuted in ECW at Bloodfest.

NWA Bloodfest: Part 1 was held on October 1, 1993 in the ECW Arena in Philadelphia, Pennsylvania in the United States. It was attended by approximately 250 people. The referees for the event were Jim Molineaux and John Finnegan.

The opening bout was a tag team match in which the Bad Breed, who were making their ECW debut, defeated Chad Austin and Todd Shaw.

The second bout was a singles match in which Rockin' Rebel defeated Don E. Allen by pinfall following a spinebuster. Following the match, Rockin' Rebel brawled with Chris Michaels at ringside, setting up a bout between them later that evening.

The third bout was a tag team match pitting the Public Enemy against Gino Caruso and Silver Jet. The Public Enemy won the bout by pinfall following a senton bomb by Rocco Rock.

The fourth bout was a singles match in which Malia Hosaka defeated Molly McShane by pinfall following a senton bomb.

The fifth bout was a tag team match between Badd Company and the Bad Breed. Badd Company won the bout when Paul Diamond pinned Ian Rotten following a belly to belly suplex.

The sixth bout was a singles match in which the Sandman defeated Metal Maniac by pinfall following a diving clothesline.

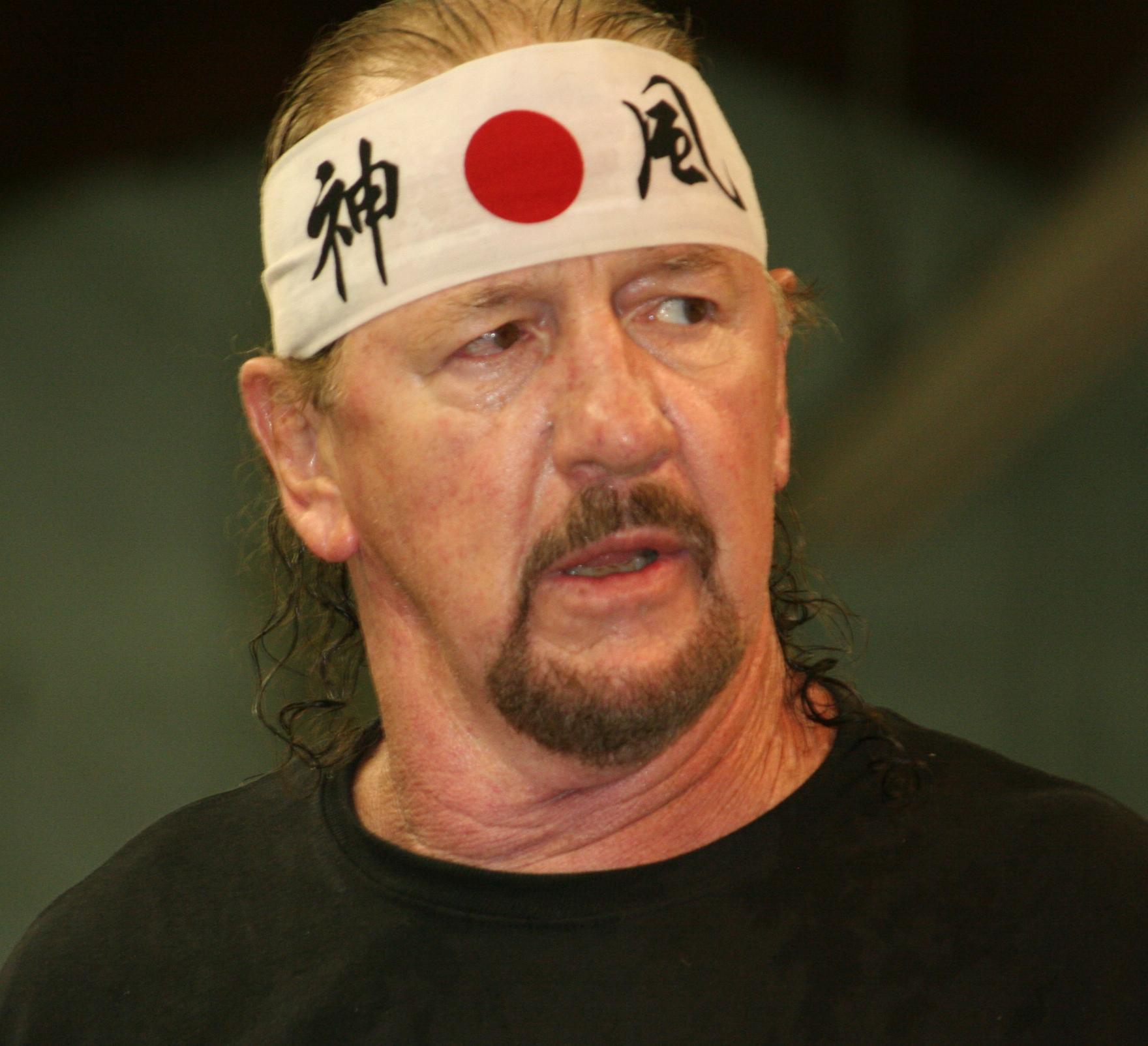
Terry Funk (pictured in 2013) won the ECW Television Championship in the main event of the first night of Bloodfest.

The seventh bout was a six man tag team match pitting Abdullah the Butcher, J.T. Smith and Terry Funk against Don Muraco, Jimmy Snuka, and Kevin Sullivan. The match ended when Smith pinned Muraco using a schoolboy.

The eighth bout was a "no disqualification, no count out" match between Sabu and the Tazmaniac, both of whom were making their debuts in ECW. Sabu won the match by pinning the Tazmaniac following a moonsault.

The ninth bout saw ECW Tag Team Champions Johnny Hotbody and Tony Stetson defend their titles against Badd Company. Hotbody and Stetson defeated Badd Company to retain the Championship after Rocco Rock interfered in the match by attacking Paul Diamond, enabling Stetson to pin him.

The tenth bout was a singles match between Rockin' Rebel and Chris Michaels. Rockin' Rebel won the bout by pinning Michaels after striking him with a foreign object.

The penultimate bout was a singles match between Kevin Sullivan and Abdullah the Butcher. The match ended in a no contest.

The main event saw ECW Television Champion Jimmy Snuka defend his title against Terry Funk in a steel cage match. Funk defeated Snuka to win the Championship by climbing out of the cage.

=== Results ===
No.	Results	Stipulations	Times
1	The Bad Breed (Axl Rotten and Ian Rotten) defeated Chad Austin and Todd Shaw	Tag team match	15:11
2	Rockin' Rebel (with Chris Michaels) defeated Don E. Allen by pinfall	Singles match	—
3	The Public Enemy (Johnny Grunge and Rocco Rock) defeated Gino Caruso and Silver Jet by pinfall	Tag team match	—
4	Malia Hosaka defeated Molly McShane by pinfall	Singles match	6:12
5	Badd Company (Pat Tanaka and Paul Diamond) defeated the Bad Breed (Axl Rotten and Ian Rotten) by pinfall	Tag team match	14:19
6	The Sandman defeated Metal Maniac by pinfall	Singles match	—
7	Abdullah the Butcher, J.T. Smith and Terry Funk defeated Jimmy Snuka, Kevin Sullivan and Don Muraco by pinfall	Six man tag team match	4:56
8	Sabu (with 911 and Hunter Q. Robbins III) defeated the Tazmaniac by pinfall	Singles match	10:22
9	Tony Stetson and Johnny Hotbody (c) (with Hunter Q. Robbins III) defeated Badd Company (Pat Tanaka and Paul Diamond) by pinfall	Tag team match for the ECW Tag Team Championship	—
10	Rockin' Rebel defeated Chris Michaels by pinfall	Singles match	—
11	Kevin Sullivan vs. Abdullah the Butcher ended in a no contest	Singles match	5:39
12	Terry Funk defeated Jimmy Snuka (c) by escaping the cage	Steel cage match for the ECW Television Championship	19:21
(c) / – the champion(s) heading into the match

== Part two ==
=== Event ===
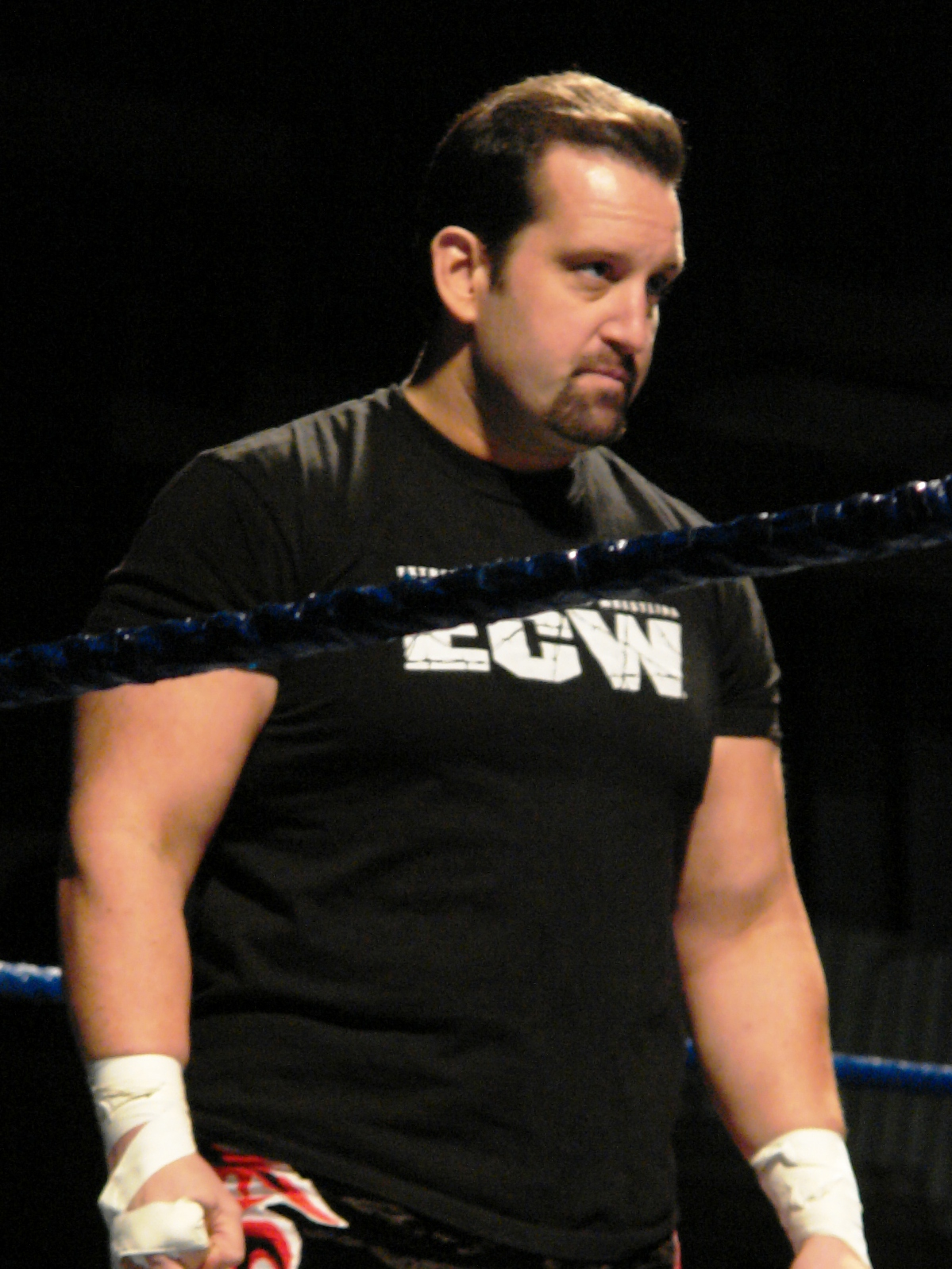
The debuting Tommy Dreamer received a standing ovation following his match at the second night of Bloodfest.

NWA Bloodfest: Part 2 was held on October 2, 1993 in the ECW Arena in Philadelphia, Pennsylvania in the United States. It was attended by approximately 400 people.

In the opening bout, ECW Tag Team Champions Johnny Hotbody and Tony Stetson defended their titles against J.T. Smith and the Sandman. Hotbody and Stetson retained their titles after The Sandman and Smith were disqualified following interference from Terry Funk.

In the second bout, The Tazmaniac defeated the debuting Tommy Dreamer by pinfall following a super Northern Lights suplex. The match saw Dreamer kicked out of multiple pinfall attempts, leading to him receiving a standing ovation from the audience after the match.

The third bout was a Singles match in which Kevin Sullivan defeated Gino Caruso by pinfall.

The fourth bout saw ECW Heavyweight Champion Shane Douglas defend his title against J.T. Smith. Douglas won the bout after Terry Funk - who had accompanied Smith to ringside - threw in a towel while Douglas was applying a figure-four leglock to Smith.

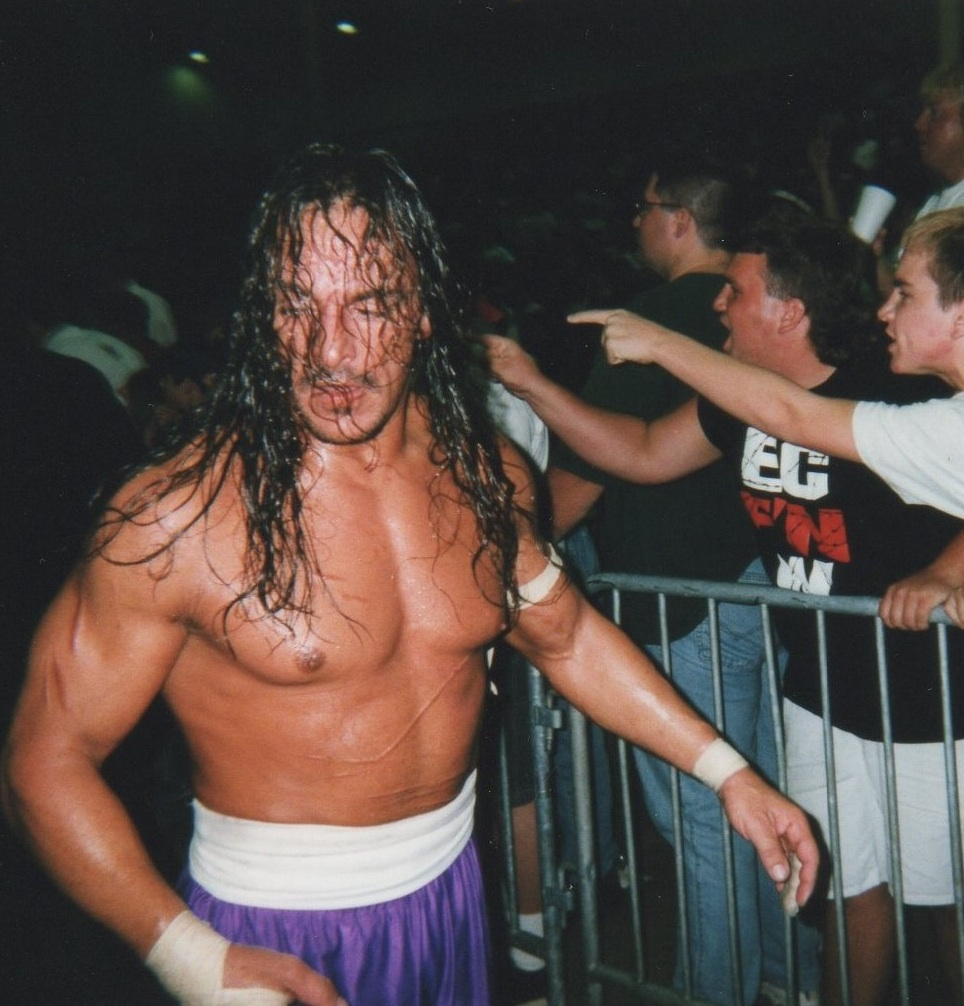
Sabu won the ECW Heavyweight Championship at the second night of Bloodfest.

The fifth bout was a tag team match between Badd Company and the Public Enemy. Badd Company won the bout when Paul Diamond pinned Rocco Rock after Johnny Grunge accidentally hit him.

The sixth bout saw Chris Michaels face Rockin' Rebel in a rematch from the prior night. Michaels defeated Rockin' Rebel by disqualification after Rockin' Rebel attacked the referee.

The seventh bout was a tag team match pitting the Bad Breed against Don E. Allen and Chad Austin. The Bad Breed won the bout when Ian Rotten pinned Allen following a Rocket Launcher.

The eighth bout was a tag team match pitting Don Muraco and Jimmy Snuka against the Public Enemy. Muraco and Snuka won the bout via forfeit.

The ninth bout saw ECW Heavyweight Champion Shane Douglas defend his title against Sabu, with Sabu announced as a replacement for the Sandman after he was shown unconscious backstage, implicitly having been attacked by Sabu's manager Paul E. Dangerously. After Douglas attempted to attack Dangerously at ringside, Sabu gave him a belly-to-back suplex followed by a moonsault, then pinned him to become the new Heavyweight Champion.

The tenth bout was a singles match between Chad Austin and Jimmy Snuka. Snuka defeated Austin by pinfall following a slingshot suplex.

The penultimate bout was a steel cage match between Abdullah the Butcher and Kevin Sullivan that was won by Sullivan.

The main event was another steel cage match, this one featuring Badd Company, the Bad Breed, and the Public Enemy. The Public Enemy won the bout after Rocco Rock climbed out of the cage.

=== Results ===
No.	Results	Stipulations	Times
1	Johnny Hotbody and Tony Stetson (c) (with Hunter Q. Robbins III) defeated J.T. Smith and the Sandman (with Terry Funk) by disqualification	Tag team match for the ECW Tag Team Championship	6:11
2	The Tazmaniac defeated Tommy Dreamer by pinfall	Singles match	7:38
3	Kevin Sullivan defeated Gino Caruso by pinfall	Singles match	—
4	Shane Douglas (c) (with Sherri Martel) defeated J.T. Smith (with Terry Funk) via submission	Singles match for the ECW Heavyweight Championship	7:00
5	Badd Company (Paul Diamond) and Pat Tanaka defeated the Public Enemy (Johnny Grunge and Rocco Rock) by pinfall	Tag team match	4:29
6	Chris Michaels defeated Rockin' Rebel by disqualification	Singles match	—
7	The Bad Breed (Axl Rotten and Ian Rotten) defeated Chad Austin and Don E. Allen by pinfall	Tag team match	—
8	Don Muraco and Jimmy Snuka defeated the Public Enemy (Johnny Grunge and Rocco Rock) via forfeit	Tag team match	5:58
9	Sabu (with Paul E. Dangerously) defeated Shane Douglas (c) (with Sherri Martel) by pinfall	Singles match for the ECW Heavyweight Championship	12:14
10	Jimmy Snuka defeated Chad Austin by pinfall	Singles match	5:53
11	Kevin Sullivan defeated Abdullah the Butcher	Steel cage match	—
12	The Public Enemy (Johnny Grunge and Rocco Rock) defeated the Bad Breed (Axl Rotten and Ian Rotten) and Badd Company (Paul Diamond and Pat Tanaka)	Steel cage match	22:54
(c) / – the champion(s) heading into the match
