= November to Remember =

- Promotions: Eastern Championship Wrestling / Extreme Championship Wrestling
- First event: November to Remember (1993)
- Last event: November to Remember (2000)
- Event gimmick: ECW's flagship event

November to Remember (commonly abbreviated to N2R) was a professional wrestling event produced by Eastern/Extreme Championship Wrestling (ECW). It was held during the month of November from 1993 to 2000. Starting with the 1997 edition the event was broadcast on pay-per-view (PPV). The event was considered to be ECW's flagship supercard, and was typically promoted every year with a video package set to Guns N' Roses's "November Rain". The rights to the event now belong to World Wrestling Entertainment (WWE).

== Dates, venues and main events ==
Event	Date	City	Venue	Main event	Ref
November to Remember (1993)	November 13, 1993	Philadelphia, Pennsylvania	ECW Arena	ECW Heavyweight Champion Sabu and Road Warrior Hawk vs. ECW Television Champion Terry Funk and King Kong Bundy for the ECW Heavyweight Championship and the ECW Television Championship	
November to Remember (1994)	November 5, 1994	Philadelphia, Pennsylvania	ECW Arena	Sabu vs. Chris Benoit; Chris Benoit vs. 2 Cold Scorpio	
November to Remember (1995)	November 18, 1995	Philadelphia, Pennsylvania	ECW Arena	Terry Funk and Tommy Dreamer vs. Raven and Cactus Jack	
November to Remember (1996)	November 16, 1996	Philadelphia, Pennsylvania	ECW Arena	Terry Funk and Tommy Dreamer vs. Shane Douglas and Brian Lee	
November to Remember (1997)	November 30, 1997	Monaca, Pennsylvania	Golden Dome	Bam Bam Bigelow (c) vs. Shane Douglas for the ECW World Heavyweight Championship	
November to Remember (1998)	November 1, 1998	New Orleans, Louisiana	Lakefront Arena	The Triple Threat (Shane Douglas, Bam Bam Bigelow and Chris Candido) vs. Sabu, Rob Van Dam and Taz	
November to Remember (1999)	November 7, 1999	Buffalo, New York	Burt Flickinger Center	Raven, Tommy Dreamer and The Sandman vs. Rhino and Impact Players (Justin Credible and Lance Storm)	
November to Remember (2000)	November 5, 2000	Villa Park, Illinois	Odeum Expo Center	Jerry Lynn (c) vs. The Sandman, Justin Credible and Steve Corino in a Double Jeopardy match for the ECW World Heavyweight Championship	
(c) – refers to the champion(s) heading into the match
