= Bad Breed =

Professional wrestling disbanded tag team

Tag team
- Members: Axl Rotten; Ian Rotten
- Name(s): Axl Rotten and Ian Rotten; Bad Breed; The Rotten Brothers
- Billed heights: Axl Rotten: 6 ft 2 in (1.88 m); Ian Rotten: 5 ft 11 in (1.80 m)
- Combined billed weight: 525 lb (238 kg; 37.5 st)
- Hometown: Newcastle, England
- Billed from: Newcastle, England
- Debut: 1992
- Disbanded: 2013

The Bad Breed was the professional wrestling tag team of Axl Rotten with his storyline brother/real life protégé Ian Rotten. The team achieved their greatest fame in the Philadelphia professional wrestling promotion Extreme Championship Wrestling, but has also competed in the Global Wrestling Federation, Independent Wrestling Association Mid-South and the United States Wrestling Association.

== History ==
=== Global Wrestling Federation ===
The storyline brothers Axl and Ian Rotten first started to team as the Bad Breed in the Global Wrestling Federation (GWF) in 1992. On January 29, 1993, Axl and Ian defeated the Texas Mustangs (Bobby Duncum, Jr. and John Hawk aka. JBL) to win the GWF Tag Team Championship. Their run with the GWF gold did not last long as they were defeated less than a month later by The Ebony Experience (Booker T and Stevie Ray), and they left the promotion soon after.

=== Extreme Championship Wrestling ===
In October that same year the Rotten ”Brothers” made their debut for a relatively new promotion in Philadelphia, Pennsylvania then known as Eastern Championship Wrestling (ECW) at the event NWA Bloodfest. In their debut they defeated the makeshift team of Chad Austin and Todd Shawn at NWA Bloodfest on October 1, but lost to Badd Company (Pat Tanaka and Paul Diamond) less than two hours later. The next night they main evented the show in a loss to Public Enemy in a "Three Way Steel Cage Match" (third team was Badd Company). A few weeks later Bad Breed unsuccessfully challenged for the ECW Tag Team Championship as they lost to champions Tony Stetson and Johnny Hotbody. Bad Breed gained a measure of revenge by defeating Stetson and Hotbody on November 12 in a non-title match.

In June 1994, Bad Breed started a feud with Public Enemy over the ECW Tag Team Title, but throughout the feud Bad Breed was never able to defeat Public Enemy for the gold. After feuding with Public Enemy the Rottens next targeted The Pitbulls, this feud led to the two teams facing off at November to Remember in a match where the losing team was forced to split up. Bad Breed lost when Pittbull #2 pinned Ian.

Since the brothers both blamed each other for the loss, they began a feud against one another after teaming together for two years. The first match between the two "brothers" was at Double Tables on February 4, 1995, which Ian won. They next clashed in a “Hair vs Hair” match on the April 8 show Three Way Dance. After being shaved bald Ian came looking for revenge at Hostile City Showdown 1995 only a week later, this time in a “Barbedwire Baseball Bat” match, but once again Axl beat his “brother”. Their final match took place at Hardcore Heaven in a Taipei Death match.

=== Reunions ===
Axl and Ian Rotten would reunite in 2002 where the duo won the IWA Mid-South Tag Team Championship on March 2, but Axl would not be around long enough to see the team lose the belts, which forced Necro Butcher to team with Ian as they lost the titles on April 5.

The Bad Breed reunited at Hardcore Homecoming on June 10, 2005, when they took on the reunion of The Gangstinators in an "ECW fight" (an un-sanctioned match where there are no rules, only a fight until there is one man or team standing). On the heels of their success at Hardcore Homecoming, Bad Breed once again teamed up in IWA Mid-South to win the IWA Mid-South tag team title from Vito and Sal Thomaselli, but were forced to vacate the titles when Ian suffered a concussion and had to take time off.

They continued working in the independents and IWA Mid-South until 2013 when Axl retired from wrestling.

Axl passed away on February 4, 2016, at 44 from a drug overdose.

== Championships and accomplishments ==
- Global Wrestling Federation
  - GWF Tag Team Championship (1 time)
- Independent Wrestling Association Mid-South
  - IWA Mid-South Tag Team Championship (2 times)
