= The Pitbulls =

Professional wrestling disbanded tag team

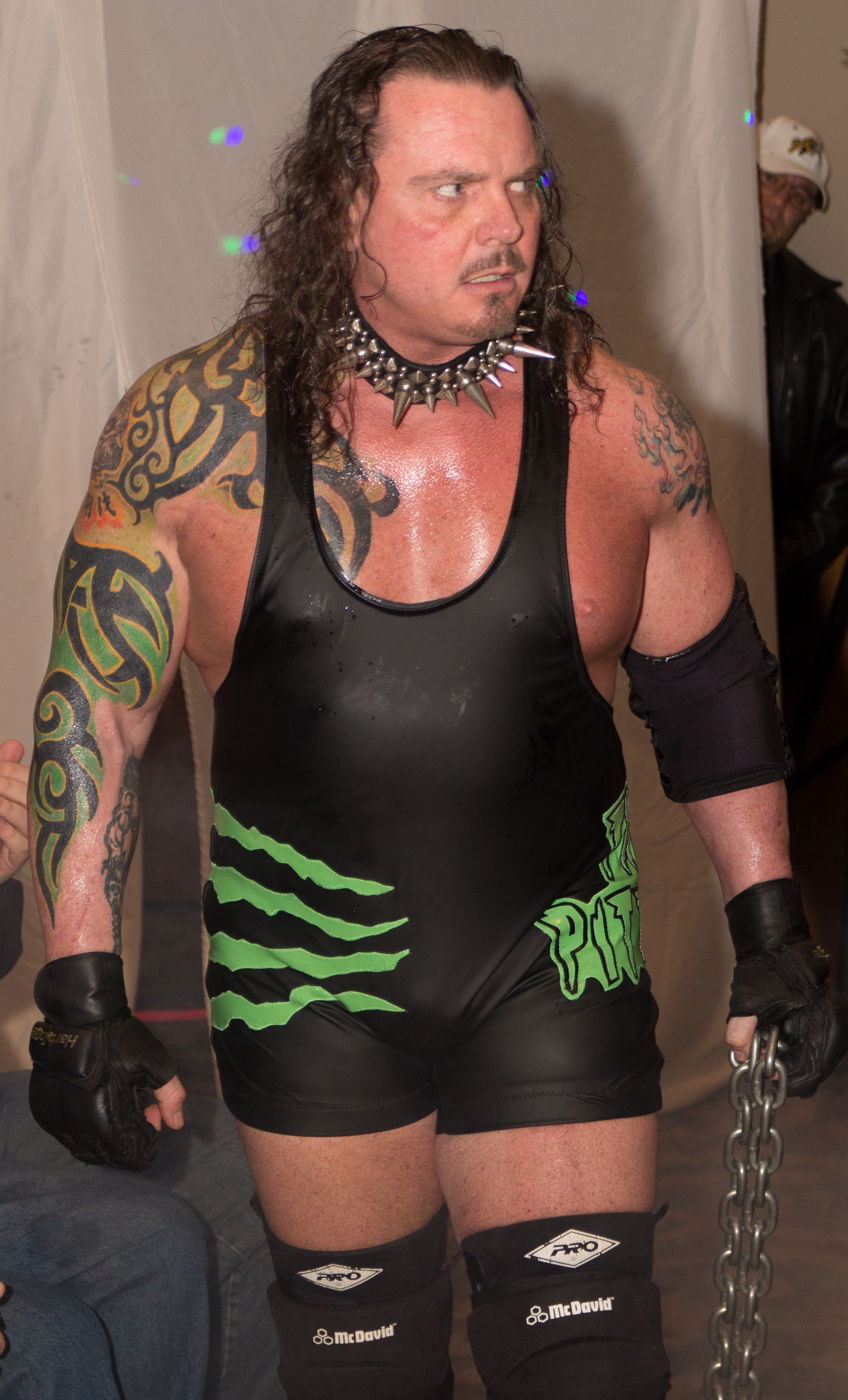
- Pitbull #1

Tag team
- Members: Pitbull #1; Pitbull #2
- Name(s): The Pitbulls; Wolfe and Durante; Mad Bull Busters; The American Bulldogs; The Pit Bulldogs
- Billed heights: 5 ft 9 in (1.75 m) - Wolfe; 6 ft 4 in (1.93 m) - Durante
- Combined billed weight: 485 lb (220 kg; 34.6 st)
- Hometown: Hammonton, New Jersey
- Debut: 1989
- Disbanded: 2002

The Pitbulls (sometimes written as The Pit Bulls) were a professional wrestling tag team who consisted of "Pitbull #1" Gary Wolfe and "Pitbull #2" Anthony Durante. They were best known for their tenure in Extreme Championship Wrestling, where they were one-time Tag Team Champions. In addition to tag team success, both members were each one time Television Champions as well.

== History ==
=== World Wrestling Federation (1989) ===
In 1989, Wolfe and Durante wrestled briefly in the World Wrestling Federation, losing to The Hart Foundation on March 4, 1989. They also lost to The Brain Busters on June 27, 1989, and the Fabulous Rougeau brothers on Primetime aired on 25 September 1989.

=== South Atlantic Pro Wrestling and New Japan (1990-1991) ===
In 1990, Wofle and Durante went to South Atlantic Pro Wrestling as the American Bulldogs and later renaming themselves the Pitbulls. They defeated The Nasty Boys for the tag team titles.

In 1991 they went to New Japan Pro-Wrestling as the Mad Bull Busters. They stayed there for a year.

=== Eastern/Extreme Championship Wrestling (1992-1997) ===
The Pitbulls debuted Extreme Championship Wrestling in April 1992 both competing in battle royals to crown the first ECW Heavyweight Champion. Neither were successful. Durante left shortly after, Wolfe, became known as "the Pitbull", won the Television Championship on April 16, 1994. Later 1994, Wolfe and Durante, who became "Pitbull #2", reunited The Pitbulls and had notable feuds with Public Enemy and the Bad Breed, the feud with the Bad Breed culminated at the November to Remember in a match where the Losing team was forced to split up. The Pitbulls were victorious. The Pitbulls won their first and only Tag Team Championship on September 16, 1995, at Gangstas Paradise from Raven and Stevie Richards. They were soon joined by Francine, who became their manager and dubbed herself "The Beastmaster". One month later at South Philly Jam, they lost the titles back to Raven and Richards. In 1996, The Pitbulls moved into an intense feud with The Eliminators, which saw their manager Francine receive the Total Elimination on two occasions. The feud culminated at the first-ever CyberSlam in a three-on-three dog collar match, which saw Francine team with the Pitbulls against Stevie Richards with The Eliminators. The Pitbulls won the match after superbombing Richards and letting Francine pin Richards. However, The Eliminators hit the Total Elimination on Pitbull #1, Pitbull #2, and Francine after the match. After this, Pitbull #2 went on to win the ECW Television Championship on June 1 at the Fight the Power event; he held the belt for only 21 days before losing it to Chris Jericho at Hardcore Heaven.

On July 13, 1996, at Heat Wave, Francine turned on The Pitbulls and became the manager of Shane Douglas. The feud between Douglas and The Pitbulls culminated on April 13, 1997, at the first ECW pay-per-view Barely Legal, where Pitbull #2 faced Douglas for the Television Championship in a losing effort.

=== Independent circuit (1997-2000) ===
After leaving ECW, The Pitbulls began competing on the independent circuit. Pitbull #2 began a brief singles run, which included one-time reigns as the MEWF Heavyweight Champion and the second-ever JAPW Heavyweight Champion, both of which ended via title vacation due to injuries. The team returned to the tag team division as they debuted in the National Wrestling Alliance's New Jersey territory, where they won the NWA United States Tag Team Championship on two occasions in 1998 and 1999 and remained the title's final champions upon the title's deactivation 2000. They lost to the Headbangers on WWF Shotgun Saturday Night on August 24, 1998. In 2000, the team went their separate ways as Pitbull #1 began competing under his real name along with the nickname "The Pitbull" for Pro-Pain Pro Wrestling, where he was the company's first-ever and only two-time Heavyweight Champion as well as a one-time Tag Team Champion with. They toured many promotions including Xtreme Pro Wrestling (XPW), Frontier Martial-Arts Wrestling (FMW) and World Wrestling Council (WWC). In 2000 they disbanded for brief period of time.

=== Return to ECW (2000) ===
On March 4, 2000, they returned to ECW as they lost to Amish Roadkill and Danny Doring.

=== IWA Puerto Rico (2002) ===
They reunited for only one night on May 12, 2002, at International Wrestling Association event in Puerto Rico defeating Bryan Madness and Maniac. This would be the last time the Pitbulls would be together. Also it was the last match for Durante.

=== Death of Durante (2003) ===
Durante died on September 25, 2003, along with his girlfriend Dianna Hulsey due to drug overdoses. A substance believed to be the painkiller oxycodone was found in the house but it was officially announced that he overdosed on the painkiller fentanyl. He and his girlfriend were found after lying in their home dead for days, all while their two small children, a 21-month-old boy and an 8-month-old girl, were apparently alone in the house with the bodies. In 2005, Wolfe appeared at World Wrestling Entertainment's first-ever One Night Stand event to introduce the "ECW Remembers" video honoring the ECW alumni who had died, including his tag team partner Durante.

After the death of Durante, Wolfe returned to the independent circuit and began competing for Pro Wrestling Unplugged as "The Pitbull" Wolfe, where he reused The Pitbull gimmick in honor of his late friend and tag team partner.

== Championships and accomplishments ==
- Allied Powers Wrestling Federation
  - APWF Tag Team Championship (1 Time)
- Consejo Mundial de Lucha Libre
  - Occidental Tag Team Championship (1 Time)
- Extreme Championship Wrestling
  - ECW World Tag Team Championship (1 time)
  - ECW World Television Championship (2 times) – Pitbull #1 (1), and Pitbull #2 (1)
- Grande Wrestling Alliance
  - GWA Tag Team Championship (1 time)
- Hardcore Hall of Fame
  - Class of 2014
- Independent Pro Wrestling (Florida)
  - IPW Tag Team Championship (1 time)
- High Risk Championship Wrestling
  - HRCW Tag Team Championship (1 time)
- National Wrestling Alliance
  - NWA United States Tag Team Championship (2 times)
- South Atlantic Pro Wrestling
  - SAPW Tag Team Championship (2 times)
