= Golden Dome (Monaca) =

Multipurpose arena in Monaca, Pennsylvania

Coordinates: 40.65496°N 80.30774°W

The Golden Dome is a 38,000-square-foot (3,500 m^{2}), 3,000-seat multi-purpose arena in Monaca, Pennsylvania on the campus of the Community College of Beaver County. On April 22, 1974, the Community College of Beaver County Building and Construction Committee decided to build the Physical Education and Recreation Center, better known as the Dome.

It hosts events for the area like high school graduations, home and garden shows, and the largest veteran breakfast in Beaver County. In the past the Dome hosted several music acts from artists like the Smashing Pumpkins, New Kids on the Block, and political events most notably a major campaign speech from then Senator Barack Obama in March 2008. At the ECW pay per view November to Remember 1997, hometown hero "The Franchise" Shane Douglas defeated Bam Bam Bigelow for the ECW World Heavyweight Championship at the venue in front of a record crowd. It was built in 1974 and is one of only eight remaining geodesic dome structures in the United States.

It is the home of the CCBC Titans.
