= Chris Michaels =

American professional wrestler (born 1961)

Personal information
- Born: William Pierce; July 13, 1961 (age 65) Bay Shore, Long Island, New York, U.S.

Professional wrestling career
- Ring name(s): Bill Pierce; Chris Michaels; Sir Christopher Michaels; Sir Richard Michaels; Simply Sensational Fabiolous
- Billed height: 5 ft 10 in (178 cm)
- Billed weight: 230 lb (104 kg)
- Billed from: Long Island, New York
- Trained by: Mark Tendler
- Debut: 1989

William Pierce (born July 13, 1961) is an American professional wrestler, better known by the ring name Chris Michaels. He is best known for his appearances with the Philadelphia, Pennsylvania-based professional wrestling promotion Eastern Championship Wrestling in 1992 to 1993. He is to not be confused with Nebraska and Iowa wrestler, Chris Michaels (real name, not a ring name) who worked for the USWA with tag team partner Todd Morton.

== Professional wrestling career ==
=== Early career (1989–1991) ===
After training under Mark Tendler, Michaels made his debut on the independent circuit in 1989. In September 1990 he started to work for International World Class Championship Wrestling and he worked there until 1992. In January, 1991 Michaels started to work for Herb Abrams UWF. In the summer of 1991 he left the promotion.

=== World Wrestling Federation (1991–1992) ===
In July 1991, Michaels started to work under his real name as a preliminary wrestler in the WWF, jobbing to names such as Sgt. Slaughter, Ric Flair, The Undertaker, Earthquake and Typhoon The Nasty Boys, Kamala, Rick Martel and The Mountie.

=== Eastern Championship Wrestling (1992–1993) ===
Michaels teamed up with Johnny Hotbody and Chris Candido to form a tag team known as "the Suicide Blondes" in Eastern Championship Wrestling (ECW) during the early 1990s. The trio won the ECW Tag Team Championship from Tony Stetson and Larry Winters on April 3, 1993. They were subsequently allowed to pick any two of the three to represent the team, via the Freebird Rule. The Blondes lost the championship to The Super Destroyers (Super Destroyer #1 and Super Destroyer #2), but regained them the same night. At some point in 1993 Chris Candido left ECW and the promotion was forced to vacate the championship.

=== Independent circuit (1994–2002, 2011, 2013–2015) ===
Michaels returned to work in the East Coast independent circuit as he established himself as a well known worker in that region and won championships in many promotions across the East Coast. He mainly worked for promotions such as Universal Superstars Of America, NWA New York, East Coast Pro Wrestling, United States Wrestling Organization and USA Pro Wrestling. In 2002 Michaels retired from professional wrestling.

On October 22, 2011, Michaels was inducted to the ECPW Five Boroughs Hall of Fame. On the same day he returned to in ring action as he worked a tag team match. Back in 2018 Chris Michaels came back as a adviser for his friend Simply Splendid Bobby C. as a Butler as part of his entourage only to later come back to once again wrestle as Sir Christopher Michaels for SWF eventually wrestling Tony Atlas. Once again coming out of retirement Chris Michaels repackaged himself as Simply Sensational Fabiolous as part of Team Splendid and in November 2019 went on to win the SWF Tag Team Championship from Steve Monsta Mac and Magic. They eventually vacated the titles. Chris Michaels as Fabiolous along with his tag team partner Bobby C. are currently the New Age Wrestling Tag Team Champions.

== Championships and accomplishments ==
- East Coast Professional Wrestling
  - ECPW Five Boroughs Hall of Fame (class of 2011)
- NWA Eastern Championship Wrestling
  - ECW Tag Team Championship (2 times) - with Johnny Hotbody and Chris Candido
- NWA New York
  - NWA New York Heavyweight Championship (1 time)
  - NWA New York Junior Heavyweight Championship (1 time)
- NWA Southern All-Star Wrestling
- Pro Wrestling Illustrated
  - PWI ranked him #242 of the 500 best singles wrestlers in the PWI 500 in 2002
- Superstars of Wrestling Federation
  - SWF United States Championship, (1 time, final)
  - SWF Tag Team Champions (1 time Vacated titles)
- USA Pro Wrestling
  - USA Pro United States Championship (1 time)
- Universal Superstars of America
  - USA Tag Team Championship (3 times) - with Tito Santana and Johnny Handsome (2)
