= Johnny Hotbody =

American professional wrestler (born 1963)

Personal information
- Born: John Weiss; June 12, 1963 (age 63) Philadelphia, Pennsylvania, United States

Professional wrestling career
- Ring name(s): Johnny Hotbody; John Weiss; Sir Jonathan Hotbody
- Billed height: 5 ft 10 in (178 cm)
- Billed weight: 220 lb (100 kg)
- Trained by: Larry Sharpe
- Debut: 1988
- Retired: 2006

John Weiss (born June 12, 1963) is an American retired professional wrestler, better known by his ring name Johnny Hotbody. He is best known for his appearances in Eastern Championship Wrestling, he won the ECW Championship, ECW Tag Team Championship, and ECW Television Championship.

== Professional wrestling career ==
=== Early career (1988–1992) ===
Johnny Hotbody broke into professional wrestling in the late 1980s after completing his training at The Monster Factory, operated by Larry Sharpe. He made a name for himself in several Pennsylvania and New Jersey–based independent promotions before signing with Philadelphia's Tri-State Wrestling Alliance (TWA) in 1990. Hotbody had a long-running feud with Tony Stetson. The TWA closed its doors suddenly in 1991, but was soon replaced by Eastern Championship Wrestling (later Extreme Championship Wrestling), run by Tod Gordon.

=== Eastern Championship Wrestling (1992–1993) ===
On April 26, 1992, Hotbody won the ECW Heavyweight Championship by defeating Jimmy Snuka. He held the title for nearly three months, before losing it back to Snuka on July 14. Later that year, on August 12, he became the first ever ECW Television Champion by defeating Larry Winters. He was later forced to relinquish the title on September 12, 1992, after sustaining a legitimate broken ankle.

Upon his return, he formed the Suicide Blondes with Chris Candido, and, for most of 1993, he competed in tag team competition. He won his first ECW Tag Team Championship with Candido on April 3, 1993, when they defeated Tony Stetson and Larry Winters. Chris Michaels was later introduced as the third member of the Suicide Blondes, which resulted in the Suicide Blondes defending the Tag Team Championships under the Freebird Rule, which meant that any combination of the three were allowed to defend the championship. He also began a feud with Tommy Cairo, attacking him after matches. The Suicide Blondes defeated Cairo and J. T. Smith in a tag team match, and for the next few weeks Hotbody competed against Cairo in matches, losing a standard singles match to him, but winning a Lumberjack match. They lost the Tag Team Championship to the Super Destroyers (A. J. Petrucci and Doug Stahl) on May 15, but the combination of Hotbody and Michaels regained it that same day. Later that year, on October 1, Hotbody, along with his former adversary Stetson, was awarded the Tag Team Championship, after the previous champions, The Dark Patriot and Eddie Gilbert, left the promotion, resulting in the titles being vacated. They had successful title defenses against Badd Company (Paul Diamond and Pat Tanaka), The Sandman and J. T. Smith, and Ian and Axl Rotten over the next month. They dropped the championship to Tommy Dreamer and Johnny Gunn, however, in a nine-second match, on November 13.

=== Late career (1993–2001, 2006) ===
Hotbody later competed for the NWA New Jersey, where he was awarded the New Jersey version of the NWA World Light Heavyweight Championship on September 25, 1998. He lost it to Rik Ratchett that same day. After successful tours in several Philadelphia-area independent promotions, Hotbody retired from active competition in 2001.

He returned to wrestling for one night on June 23, 2006, at Pro Wrestling Unplugged teaming with Gary Wolfe in a tag team match.

== Championships and accomplishments ==
- Eastern Championship Wrestling
  - ECW Heavyweight Championship (1 time)^{1}
  - ECW Tag Team Championship (3 times) – with Chris Candido and Chris Michaels (2), and Tony Stetson (1)
  - ECW Television Championship (1 time)
- Hardcore Hall of Fame
  - Class of 2025
- NWA New Jersey
  - NWA World Light Heavyweight Champion (New Jersey version) (1 time)
- Tri-State Wrestling Alliance
  - TWA Tag Team Championship (1 time) – with Larry Winters
- World Wrestling Association
  - WWA Junior Heavyweight Championship (2 times)
- Other titles
  - NAWA United States Heavyweight Championship (1 time)

^{1}Johnny Hotbody's reign occurred while the promotion was an NWA affiliate named Eastern Championship Wrestling, and was prior to the promotion becoming Extreme Championship Wrestling and the title being declared a world title by ECW.
