= ECW World Tag Team Championship =

Tag team wrestling championship

- The final belt design for ECW World Tag Team Championship. (1998-2001)

Details
- Promotion: Extreme Championship Wrestling
- Date established: June 23, 1992
- Date retired: April 11, 2001

Other names
- NWA-ECW Tag Team Championship; ECW World Tag Team Championship; ECW Tag Team Championship (official name listed in WWE website)
Statistics
- First champion: The Super Destroyers
- Final champions: Danny Doring and Roadkill
- Most reigns: Dudley Boyz (8)
- Longest reign: The Super Destroyers (283 days)
- Shortest reign: The Super Destroyers, Raven and Stevie Richards, Dudley Boyz (<1 day)
- Oldest champion: Kevin Sullivan (44 years)
- Youngest champion: Chris Candido (21 years)

The ECW World Tag Team Championship was a professional wrestling world tag team championship in Extreme Championship Wrestling (ECW). It was introduced in National Wrestling Alliance (NWA) affiliate and ECW precursor, Eastern Championship Wrestling in 1992, but was established under ECW in 1994.

== History ==
The ECW World Tag Team Championship was introduced on June 23, 1992 under Eastern Championship Wrestling, the precursor to ECW as the Eastern Championship Wrestling Tag Team Championship. This was during the time Eastern Championship Wrestling was a member of the NWA. In September 1994, Eastern Championship Wrestling seceded from the NWA, and became Extreme Championship Wrestling. The title was then established as a world tag team championship and became known as the Extreme Championship Wrestling World Tag Team Championship. On January 3, 1997, wrestling legend Killer Kowalski presented ECW World Tag Team Champions The Eliminators with brand-new title belts in Webster, Massachusetts. The championship continued to be defended within the promotion until April 2001, when ECW closed down. ECW's assets were subsequently purchased by World Wrestling Entertainment (WWE). In 2006, WWE relaunched ECW as a WWE brand that remained active until 2010. However, the tag team championship was not reactivated.

== Inaugural championship tournament ==
Semifinals
1 | The Night Breed (Max Thrasher and Glen Osbourne) | Pin
4 | The Flames (Mr. Anthony and Mr. Perez)
3 | J.T. Smith and Jimmy Jannetty
2 | The Super Destroyers | Pin

Finals
The Night Breed
The Super Destroyers | Pin
