= List of ECW World Heavyweight Champions =

List of professional wrestling champions

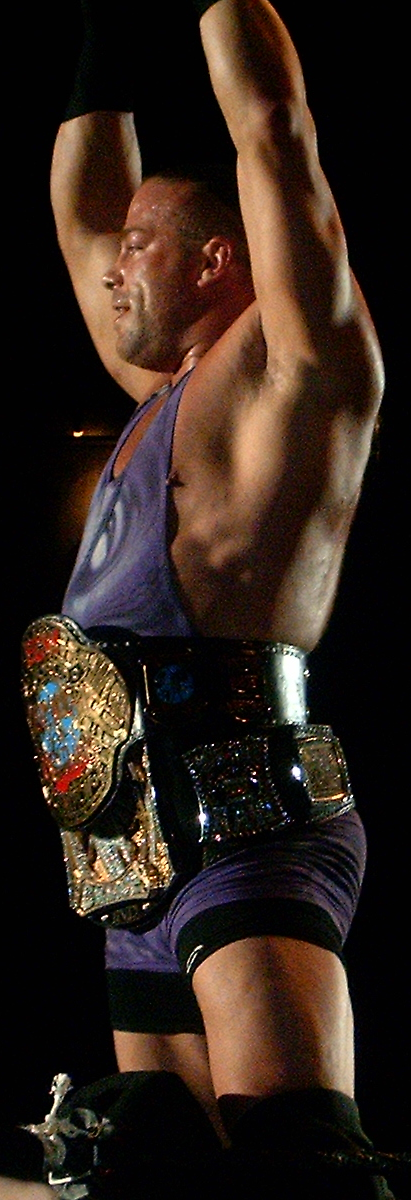
Rob Van Dam, who wrestled for the original ECW promotion, was the first ECW Champion when WWE revived ECW as a third brand

The ECW World Heavyweight Championship was a professional wrestling world heavyweight championship in Extreme Championship Wrestling (ECW) and World Wrestling Entertainment (WWE). It was the original world title of the Extreme Championship Wrestling promotion, later used in WWE as the world title of the ECW brand and one of three in WWE, complementing the WWE Championship and World Heavyweight Championship. It was introduced as the ECW Heavyweight Championship on April 25, 1992. It was originally part of the Eastern Championship Wrestling promotion, which joined the National Wrestling Alliance (NWA) on September 18, 1993. It was established as a world heavyweight championship in August 1994 following the promotion's secession from the NWA. The promotion became Extreme Championship Wrestling and the title became the ECW World Heavyweight Championship. It remained active until April 11, 2001, when ECW was closed and WWE subsequently purchased its assets. WWE relaunched ECW as a WWE brand in June 2006 with the title being recommissioned and designated as the ECW brand's world title. The brand dissolved February 16, 2010, rendering the title inactive.

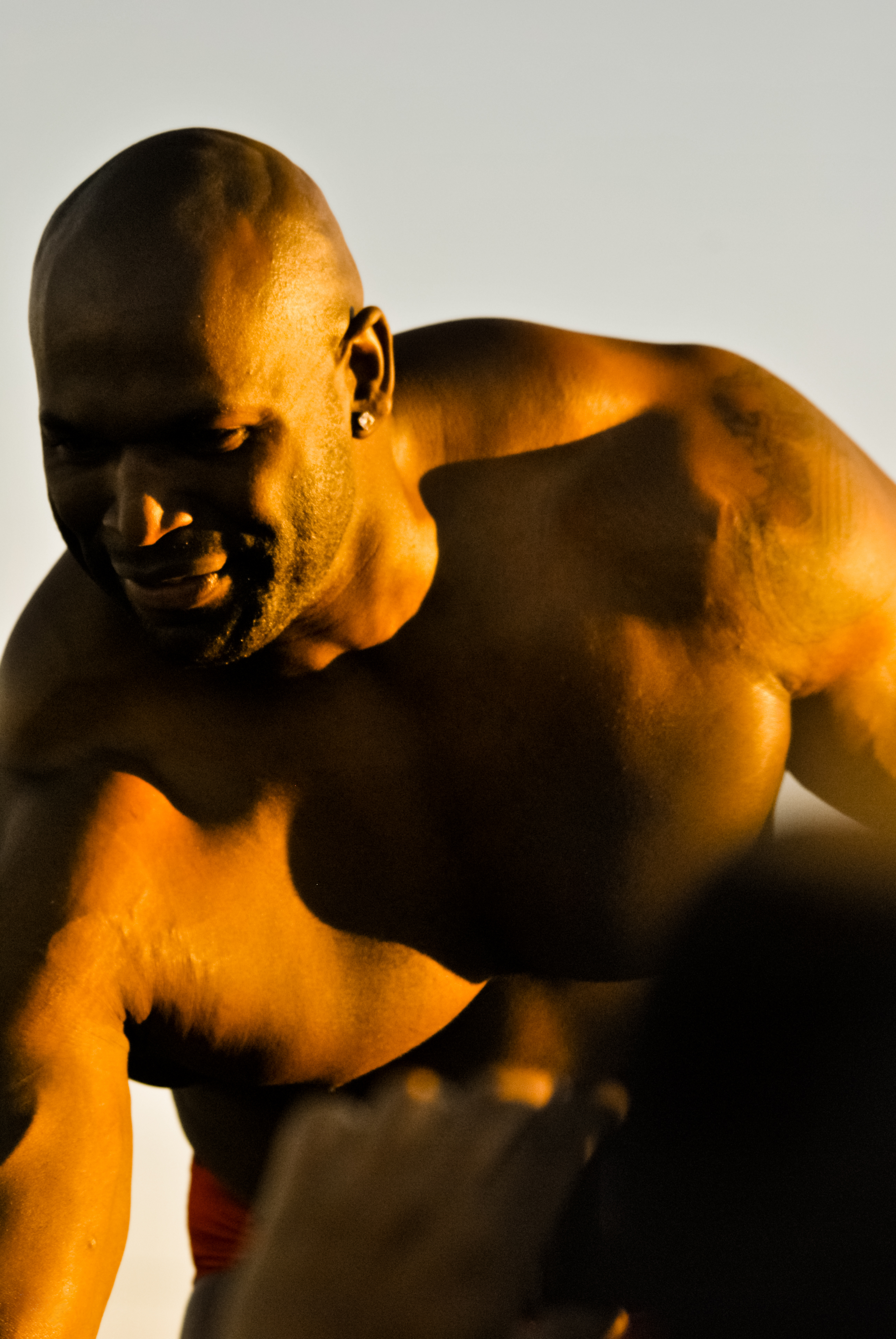
Ezekiel Jackson was the final ECW Champion, in which the championship was retired the same day of his win.

The championship was contested in professional wrestling matches, in which participants execute scripted finishes rather than contend in direct competition. All title changes occurred at ECW or WWE shows. The inaugural champion was Jimmy Snuka, who defeated Salvatore Bellomo in a tournament final on April 25, 1992, to become the first ECW Heavyweight Champion. WWE, however, does not recognize the ECW Heavyweight Championship reigns from April 1992 through August 1994. Instead, they recognize Shane Douglas' second reign, which originally began on March 26, 1994, but is recognized as starting on August 27, 1994 – the same day the championship was renamed the ECW World Heavyweight Championship – as the inception of the title's history. The Sandman holds the record for most reigns, with five. At 406 days, Douglas' fourth reign is the longest in the title's history. Ezekiel Jackson's only reign was the shortest in the history of the title as it was retired as soon as he won it. He defeated the previous champion, Christian, on February 16, 2010, at an ECW television taping event. Overall, there have been 49 reigns among 32 wrestlers, with 1 vacancy, and 2 deactivations.

== Reigns ==
=== Names ===
Name	Years
ECW Heavyweight Championship	April 25, 1992 – September 18, 1993
NWA-ECW Heavyweight Championship	September 18, 1993 – August 27, 1994
ECW World Heavyweight Championship	August 27, 1994 – April 11, 2001; June 13, 2006 – July 25, 2006
ECW World Championship	July 25, 2006 – August 7, 2007
ECW Championship	August 7, 2007 – February 16, 2010; as listed on WWE's official website

=== Reigns ===
Key
No.	Overall reign number
Reign	Reign number for the specific champion
Days	Number of days held
Days recog.	Number of days held recognized by the promotion

No.	Champion	Championship change			Reign statistics			Notes	Ref.
No.	Champion	Date	Event	Location	Reign	Days	Days recog.	Notes	Ref.
National Wrestling Alliance (NWA) and Eastern Championship Wrestling (ECW)
1	Jimmy Snuka	April 25, 1992	Live event	Mount Tabor, PA	1	1	1	Snuka defeated Salvatore Bellomo in a tournament final to become the inaugural champion; both men had won separate battle royals to advance to the final.	
2	Johnny Hotbody	April 26, 1992	Live event	Philadelphia, PA	1	79	79		
3	Jimmy Snuka	July 14, 1992	Live event	Philadelphia, PA	2	78	78		
4	Don Muraco	September 30, 1992	Live event	Philadelphia, PA	1	47	47		
5	The Sandman	November 16, 1992	Live event	Philadelphia, PA	1	138	138	While WWE.com does not include this reign in the title history, it is implicitly included in their description of Sandman as a 5-time former champion.	
6	Don Muraco	April 3, 1993	Hardcore TV	Radnor, PA	2	127	127	The episode aired on June 1, 1993 via tape delay.	
7	Tito Santana	August 8, 1993	Hardcore TV	Philadelphia, PA	1	32	32	The episode aired on August 24, 1993 via tape delay.	
8	Shane Douglas	September 9, 1993	Hardcore TV	Roanoke, VA	1	23	23	Santana forfeited the belt to Douglas and left ECW. The episode aired on September 14, 1993 via tape delay.	
9	Sabu	October 2, 1993	NWA Bloodfest	Philadelphia, PA	1	85	85	The title change aired on November 2, 1993 episode of Hardcore TV via tape delay.	
10	Terry Funk	December 26, 1993	Holiday Hell	Philadelphia, PA	1	90	90	The title change aired on December 28, 1993 episode of Hardcore TV via tape delay.	
11	Shane Douglas	March 26, 1994	Ultimate Jeopardy	Devon, PA	2	385	230	This was an Ultimate Jeopardy match pitting Douglas, Curtis Hughes, Rocco Rock, and Johnny Grunge against Funk, Road Warrior Hawk, Kevin Sullivan, and The Tazmaniac. The title change aired on the March 29, 1994 episode of Hardcore TV via tape delay. On August 27, 1994, the title was renamed the ECW World Heavyweight Championship when Douglas relinquished the NWA World Heavyweight Championship. ECW left the NWA and was renamed Extreme Championship Wrestling. WWE recognizes August 27, 1994, as the starting point of the title.	
Extreme Championship Wrestling (ECW)
12	The Sandman	April 15, 1995	Hostile City Showdown	Philadelphia, PA	2	196	195	The title change aired on the April 18, 1995 episode of ECW Hardcore TV via tape delay.	
13	Mikey Whipwreck	October 28, 1995	Hardcore TV	Philadelphia, PA	1	42	41	This was a ladder match. The episode aired on October 31, 1995 via tape delay.	
14	The Sandman	December 9, 1995	December to Dismember	Philadelphia, PA	3	49	48	This was a three-way dance also involving Steve Austin. The title change aired on the December 12, 1995 episode of Hardcore TV via tape delay.	
15	Raven	January 27, 1996	Hardcore TV	Philadelphia, PA	1	252	251	The episode aired on January 30, 1996 via tape delay.	
16	The Sandman	October 5, 1996	Ultimate Jeopardy	Philadelphia, PA	4	63	62	The Sandman and Tommy Dreamer defeated Stevie Richards and Brian Lee in a tag team match. The Sandman gained the pinfall to win the championship after Raven failed to show up for the event. The title change aired on the October 8, 1996 episode of Hardcore TV via tape delay.	
17	Raven	December 7, 1996	Holiday Hell	Philadelphia, PA	2	127	126	This was a barbed wire match. The title change aired on the December 10, 1996 episode of ECW Hardcore TV via tape delay.	
18	Terry Funk	April 13, 1997	Barely Legal	Philadelphia, PA	2	118	118		
19	Sabu	August 9, 1997	Born to be Wired	Philadelphia, PA	2	8	8	This was a Barbed Wire Match. The title change aired on the August 11, 1997 episode of Hardcore TV via tape delay.	
20	Shane Douglas	August 17, 1997	Hardcore Heaven	Fort Lauderdale, FL	3	60	59	This was a three-way dance also involving Terry Funk.	
21	Bam Bam Bigelow	October 16, 1997	Hardcore TV	New York, NY	1	45	45	The episode aired on October 20, 1997 via tape delay.	
22	Shane Douglas	November 30, 1997	November to Remember	Monaca, PA	4	406	406		
23	Taz	January 10, 1999	Guilty as Charged	Kissimmee, FL	1	252	251		
24	Mike Awesome	September 19, 1999	Anarchy Rulz	Villa Park, IL	1	89	89	This was a three-way dance also involving Masato Tanaka	
25	Masato Tanaka	December 17, 1999	ECW on TNN	Nashville, TN	1	6	5	The episode aired on December 24, 1999 via tape delay.	
26	Mike Awesome	December 23, 1999	ECW on TNN	White Plains, NY	2	112	111	The episode aired on December 31, 1999 via tape delay.	
27	Taz	April 13, 2000	ECW on TNN	Indianapolis, IN	2	9	9	Taz had signed with the WWF following his title loss to Mike Awesome on September 19, 1999. However, Awesome unexpectedly signed with WCW in 2000 while still being champion and threatened to bring the title onto WCW TV. As a result, Paul Heyman and Vince McMahon arranged for Taz to return to ECW and defeat Awesome for the title. The episode aired on April 14, 2000 via tape delay.	
28	Tommy Dreamer	April 22, 2000	CyberSlam	Philadelphia, PA	1	<1	<1		
29	Justin Credible	April 22, 2000	CyberSlam	Philadelphia, PA	1	162	161	Credible challenged Dreamer after the match and won the title.	
30	Jerry Lynn	October 1, 2000	Anarchy Rulz	Saint Paul, MN	1	35	34		
31	Steve Corino	November 5, 2000	November to Remember	Villa Park, IL	1	63	62	This was a Double Jeopardy Match also involving Justin Credible and The Sandman.	
32	The Sandman	January 7, 2001	Guilty as Charged	New York, NY	5	<1	<1	This was a Tables, Ladders, Chairs, and Canes Match also involving Justin Credible.	
33	Rhino	January 7, 2001	Guilty as Charged	New York, NY	1	94	92	Rhino challenged Sandman after the match and won the title.	
—	Deactivated	April 11, 2001	—	—	—	—	—	ECW closed on April 4, 2001, and the WWE purchased its assets in 2003.	
World Wrestling Entertainment (WWE): ECW
34	Rob Van Dam	June 13, 2006	ECW	Trenton, NJ	1	21	20	The title was revived by WWE for the ECW brand. Van Dam was awarded the title by Paul Heyman for winning the WWE Championship.	
35	Big Show	July 4, 2006	ECW	Philadelphia, PA	1	152	151	This was an Extreme Rules match. The title would be referred to as the ECW World Championship during his reign.	
36	Bobby Lashley	December 3, 2006	December to Dismember	Augusta, GA	1	147	146	This was an Extreme Elimination Chamber Match also involving CM Punk, Bob Holly, Rob Van Dam, and Test.	
37	Mr. McMahon	April 29, 2007	Backlash	Atlanta, GA	1	35	34	McMahon pinned Lashley in a Handicap Match, which also involved McMahon's teammates Shane McMahon and Umaga, to win the championship.	
38	Bobby Lashley	June 3, 2007	One Night Stand	Jacksonville, FL	2	8	7	This was a Street Fight.	
—	Vacated	June 11, 2007	Raw	Wilkes-Barre, PA	—	—	—	The championship was vacated due to Bobby Lashley being drafted to the Raw brand.	
39	Johnny Nitro/John Morrison	June 24, 2007	Vengeance: Night of Champions	Houston, TX	1	69	67	Nitro, who substituted for Chris Benoit due to his death (unknown at the time), defeated CM Punk to win the vacant championship. His ring name was changed to John Morrison during his reign on the July 17, 2007 episode of ECW. Beginning in August 2007, the title would be referred to simply as the ECW Championship.	
40	CM Punk	September 1, 2007	ECW	Cincinnati, OH	1	143	142	This was a Last Chance match which aired on tape delay on September 4, 2007.	
WWE: SmackDown and ECW
41	Chavo Guerrero	January 22, 2008	ECW	Charlottesville, VA	1	68	67	This was a No Disqualification Match. With Chavo being a member of the SmackDown roster, the title becomes shared between SmackDown and ECW.	
WWE: SmackDown
42	Kane	March 30, 2008	WrestleMania XXIV	Orlando, FL	1	91	91	Kane was a member of the SmackDown brand at the time he won the title, thus making the title exclusive to SmackDown. The title was returned to ECW when Kane defected to the ECW brand two days later. Then the title was exclusive to the Raw brand when Kane was drafted to Raw on June 23, 2008. This gives Kane the distinction of being the only wrestler to carry one championship across all three brands.	
WWE: ECW and Raw
43	Mark Henry	June 29, 2008	Night of Champions	Dallas, TX	1	70	69	This was a triple threat match also involving the SmackDown brand's Big Show. The title is once again exclusive to ECW due to Mark Henry being a member of the ECW roster.	
WWE: ECW
44	Matt Hardy	September 7, 2008	Unforgiven	Cleveland, OH	1	127	127	This was a Scramble match that also involved Chavo Guerrero, Dave Finlay, and The Miz.	
45	Jack Swagger	January 12, 2009	ECW	Sioux City, IA	1	104	102	This episode of ECW aired on tape delay on January 13, 2009.	
46	Christian	April 26, 2009	Backlash	Providence, RI	1	42	41		
47	Tommy Dreamer	June 7, 2009	Extreme Rules	New Orleans, LA	2	49	48	This was a triple threat Hardcore Match also involving Jack Swagger. Dreamer became the only wrestler to win the title both in the original ECW and in the WWE-sponsored revival.	
48	Christian	July 26, 2009	Night of Champions	Philadelphia, PA	2	205	204		
49	Ezekiel Jackson	February 16, 2010	ECW	Kansas City, MO	1	<1	<1	This was an Extreme Rules match.	
—	Deactivated	February 16, 2010	ECW	Kansas City, MO	—	—	—	The title was retired immediately after Ezekiel Jackson won it due to the ECW brand being discontinued.	

== Combined reigns ==
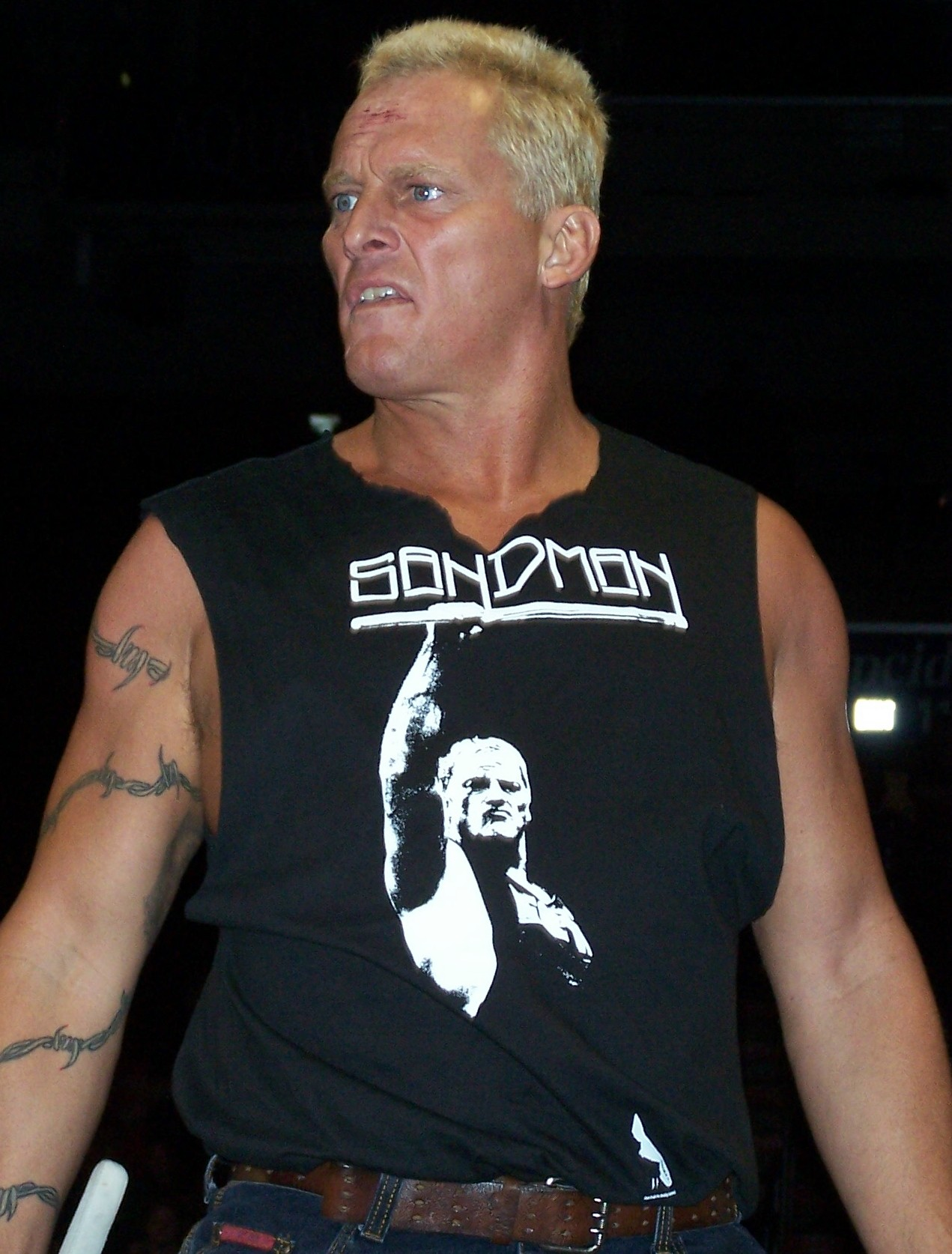
Record five-time ECW World Heavyweight Champion The Sandman

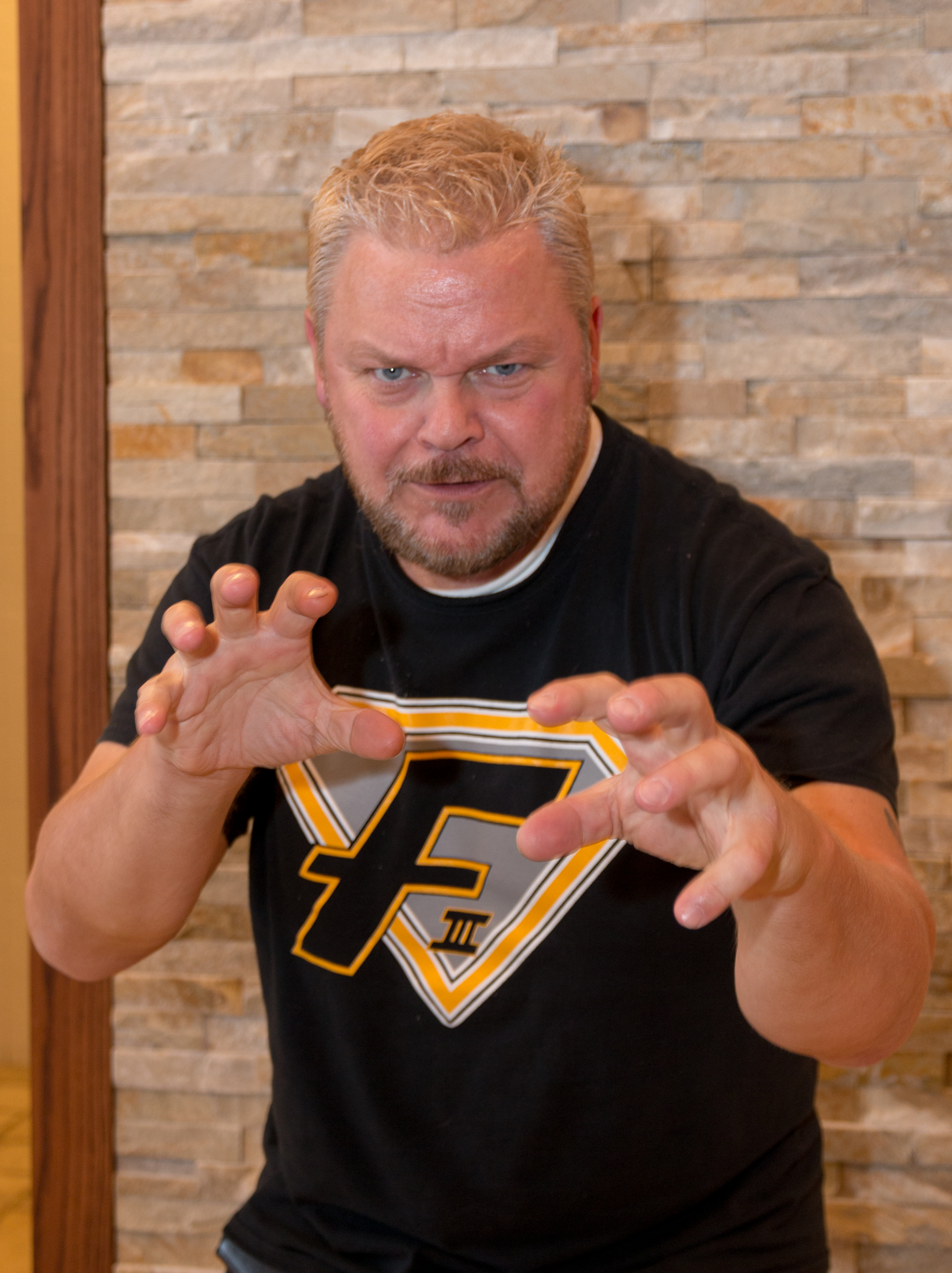
Shane Douglas, who reigned for a combined 874 days as champion. His fourth reign at 406 days is the longest single reign in the title's history

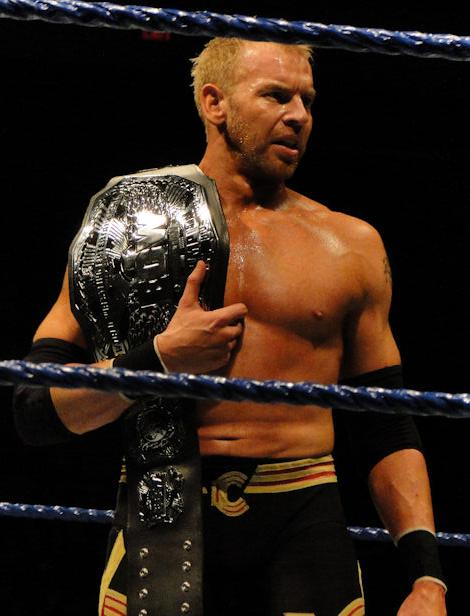
Christian is the longest reigning champion under the WWE banner, with a record of 205 days

Key
Rec.	Recognized by the promotion
<1	Reign was less than a day

Rank	Champion	No. of reigns	Combined days	
Rank	Champion	No. of reigns	Actual	Recognized by WWE
1	Shane Douglas	4	874	695
2	The Sandman	5	446	305
3	Raven	2	379	377
4	Taz	2	261	260
5	Christian	2	247	245
6	Terry Funk	2	208	118
7	Mike Awesome	2	201	200
—	Don Muraco	—	174	—
8	Justin Credible	1	162	161
9	Bobby Lashley	2	155	153
10	Big Show	1	152	151
11	CM Punk	1	143	142
12	Matt Hardy	1	127	
13	Jack Swagger	1	104	102
14	Rhino	1	94	92
15	Sabu	2	93	8
16	Kane	1	91	
—	Jimmy Snuka	—	79	—
—	Johnny Hotbody	—	79	—
17	Mark Henry	1	70	69
18	Johnny Nitro/John Morrison	1	69	67
19	Chavo Guerrero	1	68	67
20	Steve Corino	1	63	63
21	Tommy Dreamer	2	49	48
22	Bam Bam Bigelow	1	45	
23	Mikey Whipwreck	1	42	41
25	Jerry Lynn	1	35	34
25	Mr. McMahon	1	35	34
—	Tito Santana	—	32	—
26	Rob Van Dam	1	21	20
27	Masato Tanaka	1	6	5
28	Ezekiel Jackson	1	<1	

== See also ==
- List of former championships in WWE
- World championships in WWE
