= Ultimate Jeopardy =

Extreme Championship Wrestling event series

- Promotions: Eastern Championship Wrestling/ Extreme Championship Wrestling
- First event: Ultimate Jeopardy (1994)
- Last event: Ultimate Jeopardy (1997)
- Signature matches: Ultimate Jeopardy match

Ultimate Jeopardy was a professional wrestling event produced by Eastern/Extreme Championship Wrestling (ECW). The event took place in 1994, 1996 and 1997.

The 1995 event was scheduled for November 23, but was cancelled. The planned main event for that show was re-booked for the December 9 show, with some slight alterations to the lineup, becoming December to Dismember: Ultimate Jeopardy 1995. It was held in the ECW Arena, Philadelphia, Pennsylvania.

== Dates and venues ==
Event	Date	City	Venue	Main event
Ultimate Jeopardy (1994)	March 26, 1994	Devon, Pennsylvania	Valley Forge Music Fair	Terry Funk (c), Road Warrior Hawk, Kevin Sullivan and The Tazmaniac vs. Shane Douglas, Mr. Hughes and The Public Enemy (Rocco Rock and Johnny Grunge) in an Ultimate Jeopardy Steel Cage match for the ECW Heavyweight Championship
Ultimate Jeopardy (1996)	October 5, 1996	Philadelphia, Pennsylvania	ECW Arena	Stevie Richards and Brian Lee vs. Tommy Dreamer and The Sandman in an Ultimate Jeopardy Steel Cage match for Raven's ECW World Heavyweight Championship
Ultimate Jeopardy (1997)	November 8, 1997	Philadelphia, Pennsylvania	ECW Arena	Taz and Tommy Dreamer vs. Rob Van Dam and Sabu
(c) – refers to the champion(s) heading into the match
