= Ultimate Jeopardy (1997) =

1997 Extreme Championship Wrestling supercard event

- The ECW Arena.
- Promotion: Extreme Championship Wrestling
- Date: November 8, 1997 (aired November 15 and 22, 1997)
- City: Philadelphia, Pennsylvania, US
- Venue: ECW Arena
- Attendance: 1,100

Event chronology
← Previous; As Good as It Gets	Next → Better Than Ever

Ultimate Jeopardy chronology
← Previous; 1996	Next → Final

Ultimate Jeopardy was the third and final Ultimate Jeopardy professional wrestling supercard produced by Extreme Championship Wrestling (ECW). It took place on November 8, 1997 in the ECW Arena in Philadelphia, Pennsylvania in the United States. Excerpts from Ultimate Jeopardy aired on episodes #238 and #239 of the syndicated television show ECW Hardcore TV on November 15 and 22, 1997.

== Event ==
Approximately 1,100 people attended the event.

The opening bout was a tag team match pitting Chris Candido and Lance Storm against Jerry Lynn and Tommy Rogers. Candido and Storm won the bout when Storm pinned Rogers.

The second bout was a singles match between Mikey Whipwreck and Spike Dudley. Whipwreck defeated Dudley by pinfall.

The third bout was a singles match between Al Snow and Paul Diamond. Snow defeated Diamond by pinfall.

The fourth bout was a four way dance between Axl Rotten, D-Von Dudley, John Kronus, and Tracy Smothers. Kronus was the first competitor eliminated when he was pinned by Dudley, then Dudley was eliminated when Rotten pinned him following a Nutcracker Suite. Rotten went on to win the bout by pinning Smothers after hitting him with the Italian flag and then powerbombing him.

The fifth bout was a singles match between Justin Credible and Chris Chetti. Credible defeated Chetti by pinfall after giving him That's Incredible.

Following the fifth bout, Credible's manager Jason issued an open challenge for any wrestler to face him in a street fight. The challenge was accepted by the Blue Meanie, who defeated Jason by pinfall using a schoolboy.

In the penultimate bout, ECW World Heavyweight Champion Bam Bam Bigelow defeated Shane Douglas by pinfall to retain his title.

The main event was a tag team match pitting Taz and Tommy Dreamer against Rob Van Dam and Sabu. During the match, Taz left the ring to brawl with the Pitbulls in the audience, leaving Dreamer alone. Dreamer went on to win the match by pinning Van Dam following a DDT. Following the match, Sabu and Van Dam attacked Dreamer until the Sandman - who had been absent since being burned with a fireball by Sabu at As Good as It Gets in September 1997 - made his return and beat them down.

== Results ==
No.	Results	Stipulations	Times
1	Chris Candido and Lance Storm defeated Jerry Lynn and Tommy Rogers by pinfall	Tag team match	10:16
2	Mikey Whipwreck defeated Spike Dudley by pinfall	Singles match	9:33
3	Al Snow defeated Paul Diamond by pinfall	Singles match	8:45
4	Axl Rotten defeated D-Von Dudley, John Kronus, and Tracy Smothers by pinfall	Four way dance	12:53
5	Justin Credible (with Jason) defeated Chris Chetti by pinfall	Singles match	6:00
6	The Blue Meanie (with Nova) defeated Jason by pinfall	Street fight	1:07
7	Bam Bam Bigelow (c) defeated Shane Douglas by pinfall	Singles match for the ECW World Heavyweight Championship	16:55
8	Taz and Tommy Dreamer (with Beulah McGillicutty) defeated Rob Van Dam and Sabu (with Bill Alfonso) by pinfall	Tag team match	20:17
(c) / – the champion(s) heading into the match
