= SMW Volunteer Slam =

Volunteer Slam
- Promotions: Smoky Mountain Wrestling
- First event: Volunteer Slam I
- Last event: Volunteer Slam IV

Volunteer Slam was a professional wrestling supercard event produced by the American professional wrestling promotion Smoky Mountain Wrestling (SMW). Volunteer Slam was the first major supercard produced by SMW on May 20, 1992, which featured a tournament to crown the inaugural SMW Heavyweight Champion. A premier event of SMW, the event was held at the Knoxville Civic Coliseum in Knoxville, Tennessee in May every year from 1992 to 1995.

== Dates, venues and main events ==
Event	Date	City	Venue	Main event	Ref
Volunteer Slam I	May 22, 1992	Knoxville, Tennessee	Knoxville Civic Coliseum	Brian Lee vs. Paul Orndorff in a tournament final for the inaugural SMW Heavyweight Championship	
Volunteer Slam II: Rage in the Cage	May 9, 1993	Knoxville, Tennessee	Knoxville Civic Coliseum	The Rock 'n' Roll Express (Ricky Morton and Robert Gibson), Jimmy Golden, Robert Fuller and Brian Lee vs. The Heavenly Bodies (Tom Prichard and Stan Lane), Killer Kyle, Kevin Sullivan and The Tazmaniac in a Rage in the Cage match	
Volunteer Slam III	May 20, 1994	Knoxville, Tennessee	Knoxville Civic Coliseum	Jake Roberts (c) vs. The Dirty White Boy for the SMW Heavyweight Championship	
Volunteer Slam IV	May 19, 1995	Knoxville, Tennessee	Knoxville Civic Coliseum	Ricky Morton vs. Al Snow in a Scaffold match	
(c) – refers to the champion(s) heading into the match
