= SMW Heavyweight Championship =

Professional wrestling championship

Details
- Promotion: Smoky Mountain Wrestling; United States Wrestling Association
- Date established: May 22, 1992
- Date retired: December 30, 1995
Statistics
- First champion(s): Brian Lee
- Final champion(s): Jerry Lawler
- Most reigns: The Dirty White Boy, Brad Armstrong (3 reign)
- Longest reign: The Dirty White Boy (237 days)
- Shortest reign: Tommy Rich (1 day)
- Oldest champion: Jerry Lawler (46 years, 28 days)
- Youngest champion: Brian Lee (25 years, 179 days)
- Heaviest champion: Brian Lee (286lb (130kg))
- Lightest champion: The Dirty White Boy (211lb (96kg))

The SMW Heavyweight Championship was the top heavyweight championship in Smoky Mountain Wrestling. It existed from 1992 until 1995 when SMW folded. "Dirty White Boy" Tony Anthony and Brad Armstrong were tied at the most reigns at three. The United States Wrestling Association briefly recognized the SMW Heavyweight Championship as part of a USWA vs. SMW feud in late 1995, before abandoning the title.

== Title history ==
Key
No.	Overall reign number
Reign	Reign number for the specific champion
Days	Number of days held

No.	Champion	Championship change			Reign statistics		Notes	Ref.
No.	Champion	Date	Event	Location	Reign	Days	Notes	Ref.
1	Brian Lee	May 22, 1992	Volunteer Slam	Knoxville, Tennessee	1	78	Defeated Paul Orndorff in a tournament final.	
2	The Dirty White Boy	August 8, 1992	Fire on the Mountain	Johnson City, Tennessee	1	237		
3	Tracy Smothers	April 2, 1993	Bluegrass Brawl	Pikeville, Kentucky	1	43	This was a Tennessee Chain Match.	
—	Vacated	May 15, 1993	—	—	—	—	Championship held up after a match against Tony Anthony.	
4	Tracy Smothers	June 11, 1993	SMW Live event	Knoxville, Tennessee	2	36	Defeated Tony Anthony in a rematch.	
5	Brian Lee	July 17, 1993	SMW Live event	Johnson City, Tennessee	2	211		
6	The Dirty White Boy	February 13, 1994	Sunday Bloody Sunday	Knoxville, Tennessee	2	78	This was a Tennessee Chain Match.	
7	Jake Roberts	May 2, 1994	SMW Live event	Harriman, Tennessee	1	64	Aired May 14, 1994 on SMW TV.	
8	The Dirty White Boy	July 5, 1994	SMW Live event	Warrensville, North Carolina	3	207	This was a fictitious title change as Roberts had no-showed several events. Dirty White Boy defeated Brian Logan in a non-title match on this day and then defended the title against Chris Candido on July 9 in Johnson City, Tennessee.	
9	Jerry Lawler	January 28, 1995	Super Saturday Night Fever	Knoxville, Tennessee	1	29	Aired February 4, 1995 on SMW TV	
10	Bobby Blaze	February 26, 1995	Sunday Bloody Sunday II	Knoxville, Tennessee	1	41	Aired March 11, 1995 on SMW TV	
11	Buddy Landel	April 8, 1995	Fright Night	Johnson City, Tennessee	1	84	Landel's watch, car and money was also on the line. Aired on April 15, 1995 on SMW TV.	
—	Vacated	July 1, 1995	—	—	—	—	Title held up after a match against Brad Armstrong that ended in a no-contest. Landel and Armstrong had several rematches that ended in disqualifications.	
12	Brad Armstrong	August 12, 1995	Fire on the Mountain IV	Johnson City, Tennessee	1	69	Defeated Buddy Landel in a rematch. It was also a lumberjack match. Aired on August 26, 1995 on SMW TV.	
13	Terry Gordy	October 20, 1995	Halloween Scream 1995 tour	Knoxville, Tennessee	1	34	With Headbanger Thrasher, defeated Brad Armstrong and The Wolfman in a tag team match in which Armstrong's title was on the line.	
14	Brad Armstrong	November 23, 1995	Thanksgiving Thunder 1995 tour	Knoxville, Tennessee	2	2	This was a Badstreet Death Match.	
15	Tommy Rich	November 25, 1995	Thanksgiving Thunder tour	Johnson City, Tennessee	1	1		
—	Deactivated	November 26, 1995	—	—	—	—	SMW held its final event.	
16	Brad Armstrong	November 27, 1995	USWA Live event	Memphis, Tennessee	3	29	Armstrong did not defeat Rich for the title, but defended it the night after SMW closed at a United States Wrestling Association event against Jerry Lawler and lost by disqualification.	
17	Jerry Lawler	December 26, 1995	USWA Live event	Louisville, Kentucky	2	4	Also defeats Rich on December 27, 1995, in Memphis, Tennessee.	
—	Deactivated	December 30, 1995	—	—	—	—	Lawler's victory over Armstrong was recognized on television. Following this mention, the title was abandoned, as it was never mentioned again.	

== See also ==
- Smoky Mountain Wrestling
- United States Wrestling Association
