= Ultimate Jeopardy (1996) =

1996 Extreme Championship Wrestling supercard event

- The ECW Arena.
- Promotion: Extreme Championship Wrestling
- Date: October 5, 1996 (aired October 8, October 15, and October 22, 1996)
- City: Philadelphia, Pennsylvania, U.S.
- Venue: ECW Arena
- Attendance: 1,200

Event chronology
← Previous; When Worlds Collide	Next → High Incident

Ultimate Jeopardy chronology
← Previous; 1994	Next → 1997

Ultimate Jeopardy - the second Ultimate Jeopardy professional wrestling supercard event produced by Extreme Championship Wrestling (ECW) - took place on October 5, 1996 in the ECW Arena in Philadelphia, Pennsylvania in the United States. Excerpts from Ultimate Jeopardy aired on episodes #181, #182, and #183 of the syndicated television program ECW Hardcore TV in October 1996, while the bout between Bam Bam Bigelow and Terry Gordy was included on the compilation DVD Extreme Warfare Volume 2.

== Event ==
Ultimate Jeopardy was attended by approximately 1,200 people.

The opening bout was a singles match between Doug Furnas and Louie Spicolli. Spicolli defeated Furnas by pinfall following a Spicolli Driver.

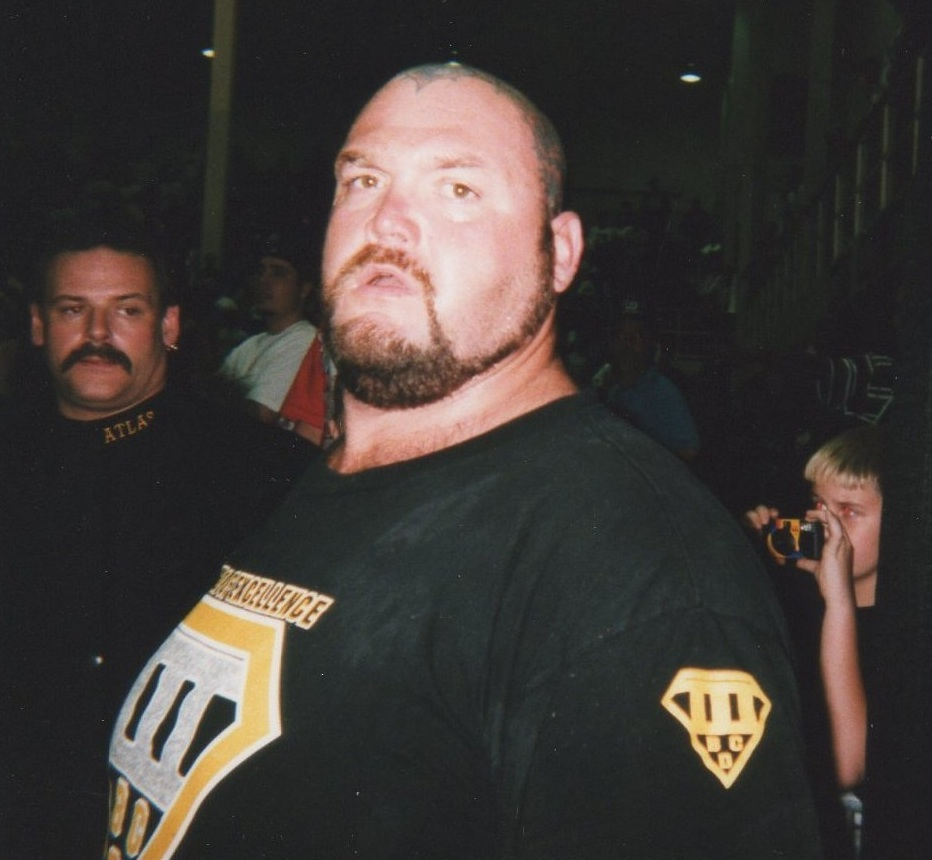
Bam Bam Bigelow defeated Terry "Bam Bam" Gordy in the "battle of the Bam Bams" at Ultimate Jeopardy.

The second bout was a singles match between J.T. Smith and Mikey Whipwreck. Smith was accompanied to ringside by both his Full Blooded Italians stablemates Little Guido and Sal Bellomo along with Whipwreck's rivals the Bad Crew and Devon Storm. Whipwreck defeated Smith by pinfall using a FrankenMikey after interference from Smith's allies backfired.

The third bout was a tag team match between the Eliminators and the Samoan Gangsta Party. The Eliminators defeated the Samoan Gangsta Party in a short squash after performing Total Elimination on both members of the Samoan Gangsta Party simultaneously, with Saturn pinning Matty Smalls.

The fourth bout saw ECW World Tag Team Champions the Gangstas defend their titles against the Blue Meanie and Stevie Richards, who were impersonating the Public Enemy. The match ended in a no contest after the Eliminators stormed the ring and performed Total Elimination on the Gangstas. The Gangstas were originally scheduled to face the Rock 'n' Roll Express but they no-showed the event.

The Sandman won the ECW World Heavyweight Championship in the main event of Ultimate Jeopardy.

The fifth bout was a singles match between Bam Bam Bigelow and Terry "Bam Bam" Gordy in what was billed as "the battle of the Bam Bams". The match ended after the Eliminators interfered and performed Total Elimination on Gordy, enabling Bigelow to deliver a diving headbutt to him and then pin him. Gordy had originally been scheduled to face Devon Storm.

The sixth bout saw ECW World Television Champion Shane Douglas defend his title against Pitbull #2 in a rematch from The Doctor Is In. Pitbull #2 was accompanied to the ring by Pitbull #1, who was wearing a neck brace after suffering a legitimate cervical fracture of his spine at Heat Wave when Douglas gave him a DDT onto the ECW World Television Championship. During the match, Pitbull #2 gave Douglas' valet Francine a running powerslam after she interfered in the match. After Douglas continuously targeted Pitbull #2's neck, Pitbull #1 climbed onto the ring apron to protest, prompting Douglas to grab him by the neck brace and shake him before throwing him to the ground. This resulted in the match being declared a no contest. Following the match, Douglas was chased out of the building by Tod Gordon and Tommy Dreamer while Pitbull #1 was removed from the ring on a stretcher. Douglas shaking Pitbull #1 by his neck brace was described by Scott Williams in 2006 as "one of the most viscerally memorable moments in ECW history"; although Pitbull #1's neck had healed by the time of the match, the audience were unaware, and were "ready to do serious harm to Douglas".

The seventh bout was a submission match between Johnny Smith and Taz in a rematch from When Worlds Collide the prior month. Taz defeated Smith by submission using the Tazmission.

The eighth bout saw the Gangstas defend the ECW World Tag Team Championship against the Eliminators. The Gangstas won the bout after Mustafa gave John Kronus a running powerslam then New Jack gave him a 187 before pinning him. After the match, the Eliminators beat down the Gangstas.

The ninth bout was a "grudge match" between two of the Dudley brothers, Buh Buh Ray Dudley and D-Von Dudley. During the match, Axl Rotten attempted to interfere on D-Von Dudley's behalf, only for Big Dick Dudley to overpower him and then give him a moonsault. The match ended when D-Von Dudley pinned Buh Buh Ray Dudley following a chair shot.

The main event was an "Ultimate Jeopardy" tag team match pitting Brian Lee and Stevie Richards (substituting for Raven, who was on a two week leave of absence for personal reasons) against the Sandman and Tommy Dreamer. The stipulations of the match meant that each of competitors would suffer a penalty if they were to be pinned. If Lee was pinned, his head would be shaved. If Richards was pinned, Raven would lose his ECW World Heavyweight Championship. If Dreamer was pinned, his valet Beulah McGillicutty would be forced to leave ECW. If the Sandman was pinned, he would be caned. During the match, Lee gave Dreamer a Prime Time Slam from the balcony of the ECW Arena through a stack of four tables on the floor below. The match ended when the Sandman pinned Richards following a DDT, thus becoming the new ECW World Heavyweight Champion.

== Results ==
No.	Results	Stipulations	Times
1	Louie Spicolli defeated Doug Furnas by pinfall	Singles match	—
2	Mikey Whipwreck defeated J.T. Smith (with the Bad Crew, Damien Kane, Devon Storm, and Little Guido) by pinfall	Singles match	8:03
3	The Eliminators (Saturn and Kronus) defeated the Samoan Gangsta Party (Mack Daddy Kane and Sammy the Silk) by pinfall	Tag team match	3:32
4	The Gangstas (New Jack and Mustafa) (c) vs. Stevie Richards and the Blue Meanie ended in a no contest	Tag team match for the ECW World Tag Team Championship	—
5	Bam Bam Bigelow defeated Terry Gordy by pinfall	Singles match	—
6	Shane Douglas (c) (with Francine) vs. Pitbull #2 (with Pitbull #1) ended in a no contest	Singles match for the ECW World Television Championship	—
7	Taz (with Bill Alfonso and Team Taz) defeated Johnny Smith by submission	Submission match	—
8	The Gangstas (New Jack and Mustafa) (c) defeated the Eliminators (Perry Saturn and John Kronus) by pinfall	Tag team match for the ECW World Tag Team Championship	—
9	D-Von Dudley (with Axl Rotten) defeated Buh Buh Ray Dudley (with Big Dick Dudley) by pinfall	Singles match	—
10	The Sandman and Tommy Dreamer (with Beulah McGillicutty) defeated Stevie Richards and Brian Lee (with the Blue Meanie, Lori Fullington, and Super Nova) by pinfall The Sandman pinned Richards to win Raven's ECW World Heavyweight Championship	"Ultimate Jeopardy" tag team match for the ECW World Heavyweight Championship.	17:13
(c) / – the champion(s) heading into the match
