= Ultimate Jeopardy (1994) =

1994 Eastern Championship Wrestling supercard event

- Promotion: Eastern Championship Wrestling
- Date: March 26, 1994 (aired March 29, April 5, and April 26, 1994)
- City: Devon, Pennsylvania, United States
- Venue: Valley Forge Music Fair
- Attendance: 700

Event chronology
← Previous; The Night the Line Was Crossed	Next → When Worlds Collide

Ultimate Jeopardy chronology
← Previous; First	Next → 1996

Ultimate Jeopardy was a professional wrestling supercard produced by Eastern Championship Wrestling (ECW) on March 26, 1994. It took place in the Valley Forge Music Fair in Devon, Pennsylvania in the United States. Excerpts from Ultimate Jeopardy aired on the syndicated television show ECW Hardcore TV on March 29, April 5, and April 26, 1994.

== Event ==
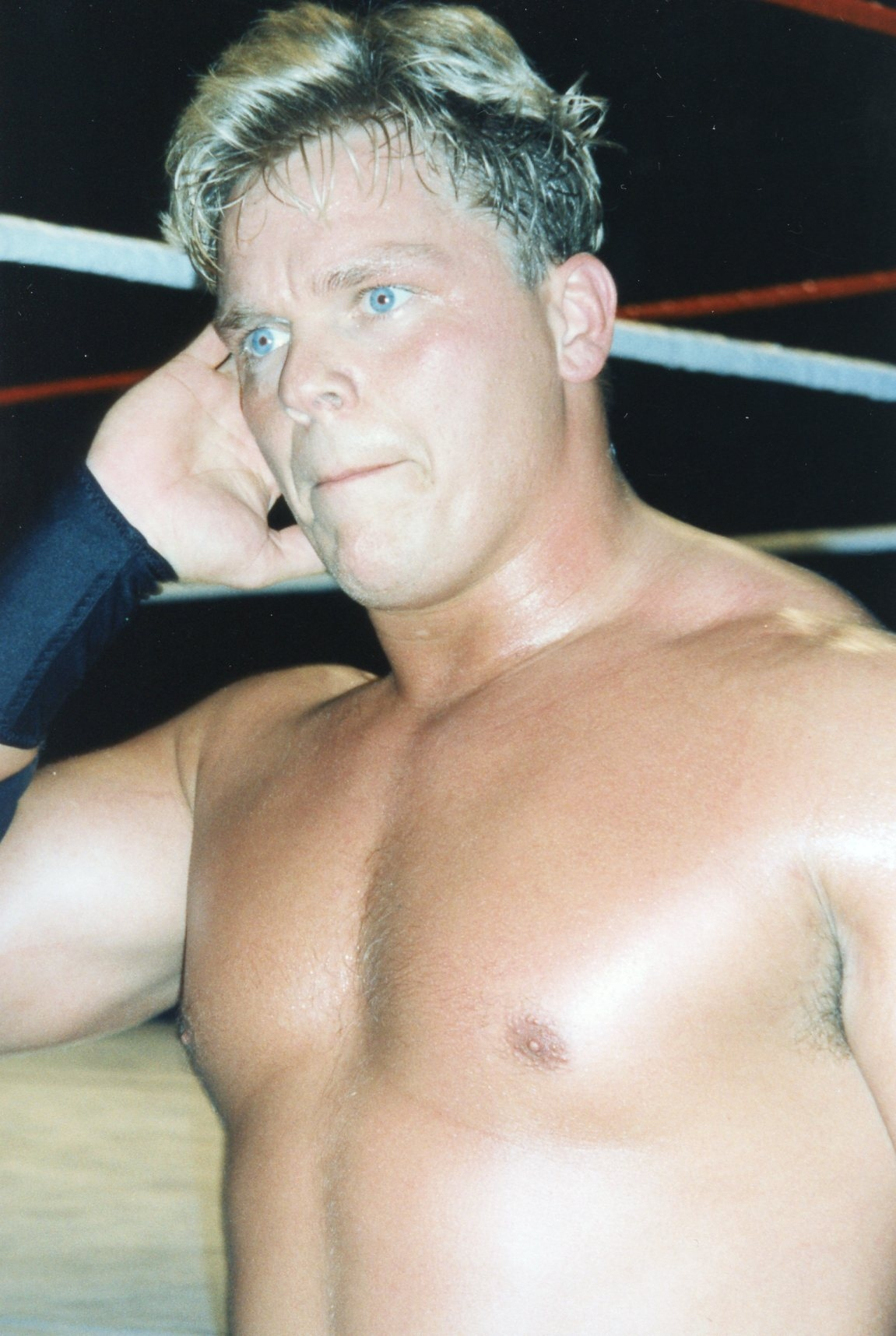
Shane Douglas won the ECW Heavyweight Championship in the main event of Ultimate Jeopardy.

The event was attended by approximately 700 people.

The opening bout was a singles match between Crash the Terminator and the Pitbull. Crash defeated the Pitbull by pinfall.

The second bout was a handicap match pitting 911 against three competitors: Blue Max, Don E. Allen, and Hack Meyers. 911 defeated the three men.

The third bout saw ECW Television Champion J.T. Smith defend his title against Rockin' Rebel. Smith defeated Rockin' Rebel by pinfall after Rockin' Rebel's manager Jason accidentally hit him with a knee strike from the top rope.

The fourth bout was a tag team match between Badd Company and the Bruise Brothers. The Bruise Brothers won the match by pinfall after simultaneous big boots to Pat Tanaka.

The fifth bout was a singles match between the Sandman and Tommy Cairo. Cairo won the bout by pinfall using a German suplex.

The sixth bout was a steel cage match between Jimmy Snuka and Tommy Dreamer in a rematch from The Night the Line Was Crossed, where Dreamer had kicked out of Snuka's Superfly Splash. Snuka won the bout by pinfall.

The main event was an "Ultimate Jeopardy steel cage match" pitting ECW Heavyweight Champion Terry Funk, Road Warrior Hawk, and Kevin Sullivan and the Tazmaniac against Shane Douglas, Mr. Hughes, and ECW Tag Team Champions the Public Enemy. Each participant had a stipulation which would be implemented if they were defeated:

- Terry Funk – whoever defeated him would win the ECW Heavyweight Championship;
- Road Warrior Hawk – he could no longer call himself "Road Warrior";
- Kevin Sullivan and the Tazmaniac – they would be forced to stop teaming together;
- Shane Douglas – his head would be shaved;
- Mr. Hughes – his manager, Jason, would be locked in the cage for five minutes with the members of the other team;
- The Public Enemy – they would be forced to stop teaming together.

Douglas won the bout for his team by pinning Funk after tying a plastic bag over his head then giving him a piledriver, thereby winning the ECW Heavyweight Championship.

== Results ==
No.	Results	Stipulations	Times
1	Crash the Terminator defeated the Pitbull by pinfall	Singles match	11:17
2	911 defeated Blue Max, Don E. Allen, and Hack Meyers	Handicap match	—
3	J.T. Smith (c) defeated Rockin' Rebel by pinfall	Singles match for the ECW Television Championship	9:08
4	The Bruise Brothers (Don Bruise and Ron Bruise) defeated Badd Company (Paul Diamond and Pat Tanaka) by pinfall	Tag team match	8:12
5	Tommy Cairo defeated the Sandman by pinfall	Singles match	7:01
6	Jimmy Snuka defeated Tommy Dreamer by pinfall	Steel cage match	17:18
7	Shane Douglas, Mr. Hughes and the Public Enemy (Johnny Grunge and Rocco Rock) defeated Terry Funk (c), Road Warrior Hawk, Kevin Sullivan and the Tazmaniac by pinfall Douglas pinned Funk to win the ECW Heavyweight Championship.	Ultimate Jeopardy steel cage match	22:20
(c) / – the champion(s) heading into the match
