= Mount Tabor, Pennsylvania =

Mount Tabor, Pennsylvania, may refer to the following unincorporated communities:

- Mount Tabor, Adams County, Pennsylvania
- Mount Tabor, Armstrong County, Pennsylvania
