= Shane Douglas =

American professional wrestler and promoter (born 1964)

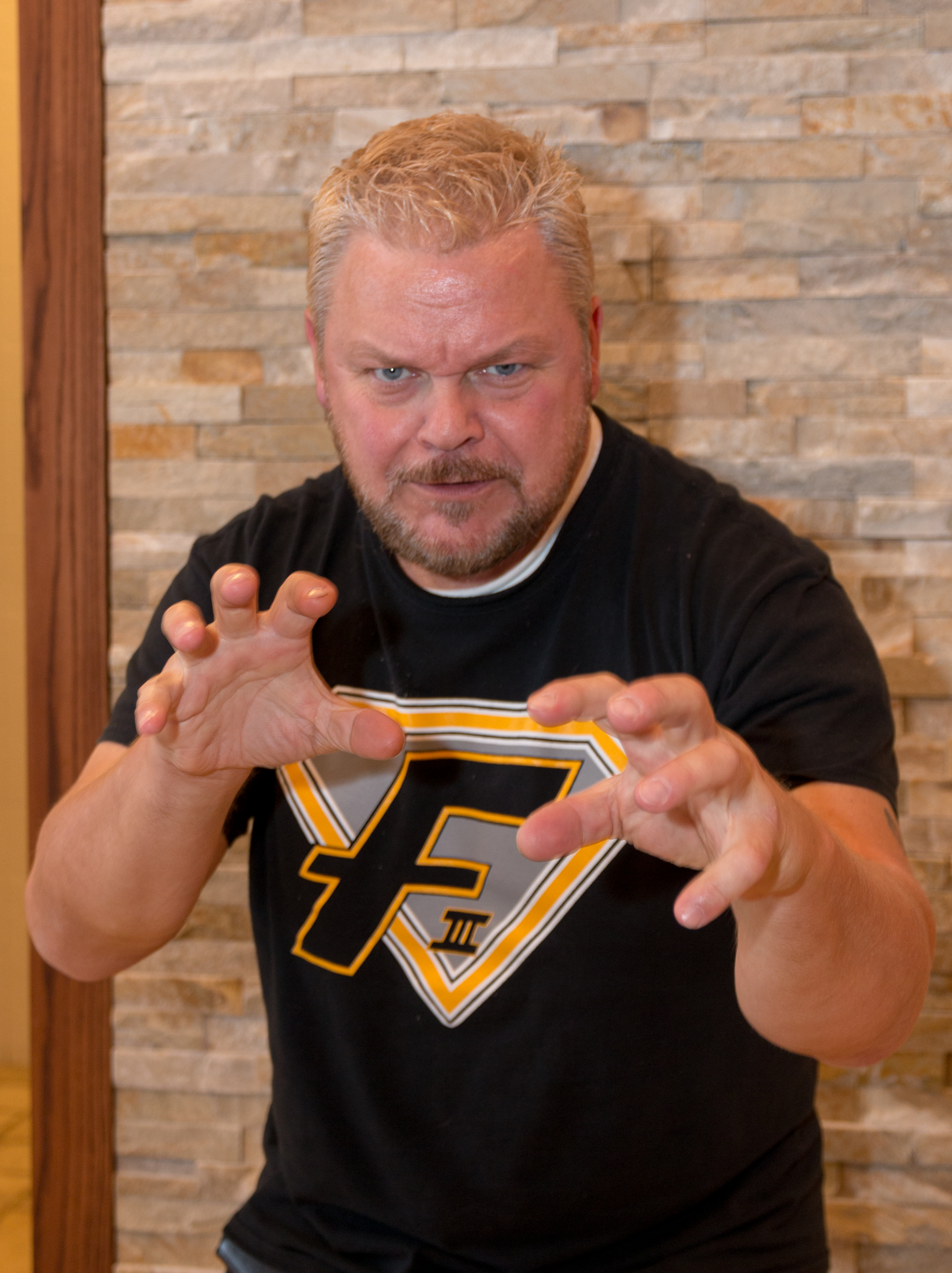
- Douglas in 2016

Personal information
- Born: Troy Allan Martin; November 21, 1964 (age 61) New Brighton, Pennsylvania, U.S.
- Education: Bethany College
- Spouses: Michelle Burke (m. 1987; div. 1994); Carla Reeves (m. 1999; div. 2017)
- Children: 2
- Website: www.franchisefansite.com

Professional wrestling career
- Ring name(s): Dean Douglas; Mike Kelly; Shane Douglas; The Franchise; Troy Martin; Troy Orndorff
- Billed height: 6 ft 0 in (183 cm)
- Billed weight: 240 lb (109 kg)
- Billed from: Pittsburgh, Pennsylvania
- Trained by: Dominic DeNucci
- Debut: 1982

Troy Allan Martin (born November 21, 1964) is an American professional wrestler, manager, and promoter, better known by his ring name Shane Douglas. He is best known for his tenures in Extreme Championship Wrestling (ECW), World Championship Wrestling (WCW), the World Wrestling Federation (WWF), Xtreme Pro Wrestling (XPW), and Total Nonstop Action Wrestling (TNA).

Martin held a dozen championships between ECW, WCW, and the WWF and is a five-time world champion: a four-time ECW World Heavyweight Champion, and a one-time NWA World Heavyweight Champion. As ECW Champion, he holds the records for most combined days as champion (874) and the longest single reign (406 days). Martin is also a two-time ECW World Television Champion, a one-time WWF Intercontinental Champion, a one-time WCW United States Heavyweight Champion and a two-time WCW World Tag Team Champion. Martin was also the first of eleven men to hold a championship in all three major U.S. promotions of the 1990s, after he was awarded the WWF Intercontinental Championship in 1995.

Martin achieved the greatest success of his career in ECW, where he debuted in 1993 and captured the ECW Heavyweight Championship twice in his first year with the company. He gained attention when he won a tournament for the NWA World Heavyweight Championship, where he publicly rejected the NWA title belt and helped ECW in evolving from an NWA territory to a national promotion. Within ECW, he was dubbed "The Franchise" in reference to his status as the franchise player of the promotion. WWE, who purchased that organization, asserted: "Without Shane Douglas, there would have been no ECW." He headlined many events for ECW including three editions of the company's premier pay-per-view event November to Remember in 1996, 1997 and 1998.

== Early life ==
Martin was born in New Brighton, Pennsylvania, one of six children of a veteran of World War II, who died in 1991. He graduated cum laude from Bethany College in 1986 with a bachelor's degree in history and political science. Martin is an alumnus of the Psi chapter of Beta Theta Pi. After earning his degrees, he was offered to join the Saba University School of Medicine; Martin declined the offer in order to continue wrestling.

== Professional wrestling career ==
=== Early career (1982–1987) ===
Martin was trained by Dominic DeNucci in the Pittsburgh suburb of Freedom, Pennsylvania, alongside Mick Foley in the mid-1980s. He had been wrestling professionally to earn money since 1982. When he started, he used the character of Troy Orndorff, the fictional nephew of Paul Orndorff.

In August 1986, Martin debuted in the World Wrestling Federation (WWF), losing to Randy Savage at a WWF Superstars of Wrestling taping using his real name. Later that month, he wrestled "Mr. Wonderful" Paul Orndorff on the debut episode of WWF Wrestling Challenge, once again using his real name. In autumn 1986, he wrestled four matches for the WWF under the ring name "Mike Kelly".

=== Universal Wrestling Federation (1987) ===
In February 1987, Martin (under his real name) debuted in the Universal Wrestling Federation (UWF), shortly priorly to its acquisition by Jim Crockett Promotions. In June 1987, he began wrestling regularly for the UWF - now an affiliate of Jim Crockett Promotions - under the ring name "Shane Douglas", which was given to him by "Hot Stuff" Eddie Gilbert and Missy Hyatt (the "Douglas" last name was inspired by actor Michael Douglas). He formed a short-lived tag team with Davey Haskins, then faced him in a short feud. On August 3, 1987, Douglas defeated Eddie Gilbert for the UWF Television Championship. He held the title until September 2, when he lost to Terry Taylor in the Cajundome. Later that month, he formed an alliance with Michael Hayes, culminating in Douglas, Hayes, and Sting defeating Big Bubba Rogers, Rick Steiner, and The Terminator in a first blood elimination cage match. He made his final appearance with the UWF in October 1987.

=== Jim Crockett Promotion / World Championship Wrestling (1987–1990) ===
In July 1987, Douglas began wrestling for Jim Crockett Promotions, a member of the National Wrestling Alliance (NWA).

In April 1989, Douglas was put into a tag team of skateboarders known as the Dynamic Dudes with Johnny Ace (John Laurinaitis, the younger brother of Road Warrior Animal). Mick Foley has opined that since neither Ace nor Douglas knew how to skateboard, the fans saw through the character and refused to buy into it. Jim Cornette, who was managing The Midnight Express (Bobby Eaton and Stan Lane) at the time, decided to manage the duo to help them get over. When Eaton and Lane in storyline did not approve, they forced a match between the two teams with Cornette remaining neutral at ringside. He ended up turning on Douglas and Ace and the teams feuded for a couple of months. Cornette's turn was to have established The Dynamic Dudes as a top fan favorite tag team, but the turn backfired and made The Midnight Express more popular than they already were.

In November 1988, Jim Crockett Promotions was acquired by Turner Broadcasting System and renamed World Championship Wrestling (WCW).

The Dynamic Dudes broke up in 1990 after Ace began competing progressively more for All Japan Pro Wrestling (AJPW), which was breaking its ties to the NWA. Jim Cornette also states that the end of the Dynamic Dudes came when Douglas went over his head to Jim Herd about having a finish changed to make him look stronger. Cornette, who was part of the booking committee, washed his hands of working with them afterwards. Shane argued that they had been repeatedly promised a big push and were instead being booked to lose all of their big matches, then getting criticized for not getting over as a top team. The Dudes would last wrestle together in March 1990, and Douglas soon left WCW after broken promises to give him a push, and wrestled on the American independent circuit.

=== All Japan Pro Wrestling (1989) ===
In August to September 1989, the Dynamic Dudes toured Japan with All Japan Pro Wrestling (AJPW) as part of its "Summer Action Series II", where they faced teams such as the Can-Am Express and Revolution. Douglas' matches during the tour included losing to Shunji Takano in Tokyo's Korakuen Hall and teaming with Todd Champion in a loss to Takano and Shinichi Nakano in Tokyo's Nippon Budokan.

=== World Wrestling Federation (1990–1991) ===
In 1990, Douglas signed a deal with the World Wrestling Federation and made his debut on the June 18 episode of Prime Time Wrestling, defeating Bob Bradley, in a match taped in Toronto, Ontario, on May 27. Douglas remained undefeated in his first month, defeating Bob Bradley, Paul Diamond, and Steve Lombardi in a series of matches. He then moved up to begin a house show series in late June against Haku and suffered his first loss on June 28 in Denver, Colorado. He remained without a win in subsequent rematches. He made his syndicated television debut on the August 26 episode of WWF Wrestling Challenge, teaming with jobber Mark Thomas in a loss to The Orient Express.

In August 1990, he received his first break when he was tapped as the temporary replacement to an injured Shawn Michaels in The Rockers tag-team. Douglas teamed with Jannetty six times in matches against The Orient Express. On August 27, he defeated Buddy Rose in a dark match at the SummerSlam '90 PPV. On the September 17 episode of Prime Time Wrestling, Douglas wrestled Haku to a draw, and he was largely undefeated against low level competition throughout the fall. A squash match victory over The Black Demon in November 1990 was included on the WWF SuperTape III home video. At the Survivor Series '90 PPV Douglas defeated Buddy Rose in another dark match, and on January 3, 1991, at a house show in Scranton, Pennsylvania, he scored the biggest victory of his nascent WWF career when he upset Dino Bravo. Four days later on the January 7, 1991, episode of Prime Time Wrestling he would pin Haku, and was strongly positioned as a rising young star.

His most memorable WWF performance took place at the 1991 Royal Rumble, where he entered as the seventeenth entrant and lasted for 26 minutes and 23 seconds before being eliminated by Brian Knobbs. Shortly after, he left the company to take care of his ailing father.

Douglas would make intermittent appearances in 1991, subbing for various wrestlers on house shows. He returned on May 8 in Youngstown, Ohio, and lost to Ricky Steamboat. In June he returned for a pair of house shows and was defeated by Colonel Mustafa. He made his final televised appearance on the June 15th episode of Prime Time Wrestling, losing to Dino Bravo in a match taped at Madison Square Garden. Douglas closed out his first WWF run with two victories - a win on July 29 in a dark match at a WWF Superstars taping against Bob Bradley, and a victory over The Orient Express on August 2 in Pittsburgh, Pennsylvania, when he teamed with Marty Jannetty.

=== Return to WCW (1992–1993) ===
Douglas returned to WCW on the September 12, 1992, episode of Saturday Night as a fan favorite, where he defeated Super Invader in his return match by using Magnum T. A.'s finishing move, belly to belly suplex, which was noted by Magnum, the following week on Saturday Night. On the October 17 episode of Saturday Night, Douglas had a match with Brian Pillman, which began a rivalry between the duo. He made his pay-per-view return at Halloween Havoc, where he teamed with Tom Zenk and Johnny Gunn to compete against Arn Anderson, Bobby Eaton and Michael Hayes in a winning effort.

While feuding with Pillman, Douglas formed a tag team with Ricky Steamboat to take on Pillman and Steve Austin in a tag team match on the October 24 episode of Worldwide. The following month, Steamboat and Douglas won the NWA and WCW World Tag Team Championships from Dustin Rhodes and Barry Windham on the November 18 Clash of the Champions XXI. Steamboat and Douglas made a successful title defense against Windham and Pillman at Starrcade.

Steamboat and Douglas began a lengthy rivalry with Pillman and his new tag team partner Steve Austin. Steamboat and Douglas successfully defended the tag titles against Austin and Pillman on the January 13, 1993 Clash of the Champions XXII, before dropping the titles to Austin and Pillman on the March 27, 1993, episode of Worldwide. Soon after losing the tag titles, Douglas began a rivalry with the World Television Champion Paul Orndorff, where he came up short against Orndorff in two respective matches in the Computer Contenders Challenge on the May 1 episode of Worldwide and the May 8 episode of Power Hour, before departing the company for Eastern Championship Wrestling (ECW). Douglas had been scheduled to team with Steamboat in a steel cage match for a title shot at the NWA and WCW World Tag Team Championship at Slamboree, but was replaced by Tom Zenk in a mask.

=== Eastern Championship Wrestling / Extreme Championship Wrestling (1993–1995) ===
==== The Franchise (1993–1994) ====
Martin debuted in the upstart ECW during its formative years on the August 24, 1993, episode of Eastern Championship Wrestling and solidified his status as a villain by joining Hotstuff International. In his first match, Douglas defeated Don E. Allen and Herve Renesto in a handicap match. Douglas quickly rose to the top of the roster, winning the promotion's Heavyweight Championship on the September 14 episode of Eastern Championship Wrestling, after champion Tito Santana forfeited the title. Douglas successfully defended the title against The Sandman at the UltraClash event. At NWA Bloodfest, Douglas retained the title against J.T. Smith before dropping the title to Sabu later that night.

"In the tradition of Lou Thesz, in the tradition of Jack Brisco of the Brisco Brothers, of Dory Funk Jr., of Terry Funk-- the man who will never die. As the real Nature Boy Buddy Rogers, upstairs tonight. From the Harley Races, to the Barry Windhams, to the (Douglas grimaces in a look of disgust) Ric Flairs, I accept this heavyweight title. Wait a second. Of Kerry Von Erich. Of the fat man himself, Dusty Rhodes. This is it tonight, Dad. (looking at the NWA World Heavyweight Championship belt) God, that's beautiful. And Rick Steamboat, and they can all kiss my ass! (throws down the NWA World Heavyweight Championship belt) Because! I am not the man who accepts a torch to be handed down to me from an organization that died - RIP - seven years ago. The Franchise, Shane Douglas, is the man who ignites the new flame of the sport of professional wrestling! (taking the ECW title belt) Tonight, before God and my father as witness, I declare myself, The Franchise, as the new ECW Heavyweight Champion of the world! We have set out to change the face of professional wrestling. So tonight, let the new era begin: the era of the sport of professional wrestling, the era of The Franchise, the era of the ECW."

— Shane Douglas on August 27, 1994 - NWA World Title Tournament

On the December 14 episode of NWA Eastern Championship Wrestling, Douglas substituted for an injured Johnny Gunn to defend the Tag Team Championship alongside Gunn's partner Tommy Dreamer against Kevin Sullivan and The Tazmaniac, during which Douglas turned on Dreamer by attacking him with a steel chain. The following week, Douglas defeated Dreamer via disqualification by hitting Dreamer with a steel chain and handing over the chain to Dreamer, which fooled the referee to believe that Dreamer had hit him with the chain. This strategy would be adopted by Eddie Guerrero a decade later. Douglas defeated Dreamer at Holiday Hell to end the feud.

Douglas developed a gimmick of a foul-mouthed, incredibly arrogant villain (an attitude that would define him permanently and give him success), and gave himself the nickname "The Franchise". His best friend Sherri Martel became his valet. Douglas gained notoriety when he wrestled Terry Funk and Sabu to a one-hour draw in the company's first-ever three-way dance for the ECW Heavyweight Championship at The Night the Line Was Crossed. Douglas dethroned Funk in an Ultimate Jeopardy steel cage match to win his second Heavyweight Championship at Ultimate Jeopardy.

Since its founding, ECW had been a member of the NWA. Douglas was instrumental in the development of "extreme wrestling" when he defeated The Tazmaniac, Dean Malenko and 2 Cold Scorpio to win a tournament to become the NWA World Heavyweight Champion on August 27. In an angle which only he, Tod Gordon, and Paul Heyman knew about, Douglas threw down the NWA title belt and stated that he did not want to be champion of a "dead promotion". Douglas raised the ECW Heavyweight Championship belt and declared it to be a world championship belt, renaming it the ECW World Heavyweight Championship. WWE recognizes this moment as the beginning of ECW Championship and Douglas as the first ECW Champion. According to the Forever Hardcore DVD, Douglas only decided to throw down the NWA belt after NWA president Dennis Coralluzzo buried Douglas on Mike Tenay's radio show. On the August 30 edition of NWA Eastern Championship Wrestling, Gordon announced he was folding Eastern Championship Wrestling, and in its place forming Extreme Championship Wrestling, a new promotion independent of the NWA. Capitalizing on the controversy that surrounded his literally "throwing down" the NWA belt and the promo following it, Douglas was encouraged to express his true feelings in interviews by the ECW bookers. This helped raise ECW's prominence in the eyes of wrestling fans and journalists and allowed it to become an alternative to WCW and the WWF and Douglas cemented a legacy in the history of ECW. Douglas closed 1994 with successful title defenses of the ECW World Heavyweight Championship against Ron Simmons.

==== Triple Threat (1995) ====
In early 1995, Douglas formed the Triple Threat faction, aligning himself with Chris Benoit and Dean Malenko. He started the year with successful title defenses of the World Heavyweight Championship against Tully Blanchard and Marty Jannetty. He then entered a feud with The Sandman during a match at Three Way Dance, where Sandman's valet, Woman, seemed to have aligned herself with Douglas by helping him in retaining the title against Sandman by handing him Sandman's Singapore cane to attack him and get the win. However, it turned out to be a ruse when she aided Sandman in defeating Douglas for the title at Hostile City Showdown. Douglas' lengthy reign ended at 385 days, which is the second longest reign in the title history.

After failing to regain the title, Douglas began a rivalry with Cactus Jack, as each man wanted to capture the title from Sandman and saw the other as competition. During this time, Douglas went on a tirade about the lawlessness of ECW and brought in Bill Alfonso as a troubleshooting referee to restore order. After teasing a departure for the WWF, Douglas finally left ECW for the WWF in July 1995, making his last appearance during a world title match between Sandman and Cactus Jack at Hardcore Heaven, during which he attacked both men and left.

=== World Wrestling Federation (1995–1996) ===
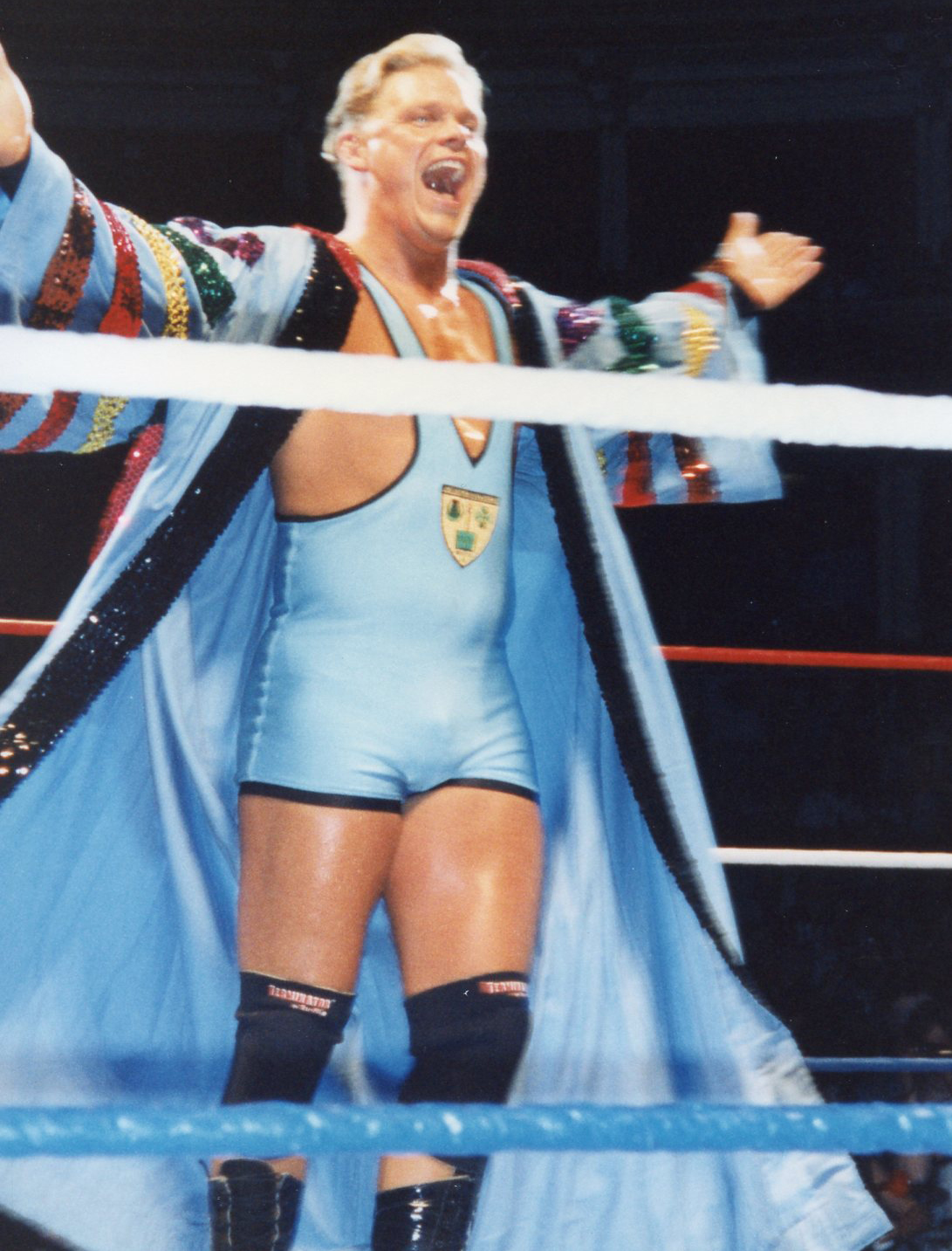
Dean Douglas in October 1995

In 1995, Douglas returned to the World Wrestling Federation with a college dean character under the ring name Dean Douglas, making his first appearance on the July 29 episode of Superstars. To establish himself, he filmed several vignettes with a chalkboard, lecturing wrestlers and fans. He would also be shown taking notes of his opponents at ringside during some matches, and frequently carried a paddle (dubbed the "Board of Education") with him to the ring. He would usually present a "Report Card" in which he would degrade the performances of heroic wrestlers after their matches.

Douglas began a rivalry with Razor Ramon after grading him "MF" for miserable failure after Razor's loss to Shawn Michaels at SummerSlam. Douglas made his in-ring return to WWF on the September 9 episode of Superstars, where he defeated 1-2-3 Kid by disqualification after Razor attacked Douglas. This resulted in a match between Douglas and Razor at In Your House 3, which Douglas won after interference by the Kid.

He was set to wrestle Shawn Michaels for the WWF Intercontinental Championship at In Your House 4, but Michaels forfeited the title due to injuries incurred after being attacked and beaten by a United States Marine in Syracuse, New York. Douglas, however, immediately had to defend the title against rival Razor Ramon. Ramon would go on to defeat Douglas, ending his reign at only 20 minutes. Douglas was randomly paired with Razor, Owen Hart and Yokozuna against Shawn Michaels, Ahmed Johnson, British Bulldog and Sycho Sid in a Wildcard Survivor Series match at Survivor Series. Douglas was eliminated by Michaels after Razor attacked him. His team went on to lose the match.

Douglas failed to recapture the Intercontinental Championship from Razor Ramon on the December 4 episode of Monday Night Raw. His last televised match was on the December 9 episode of Superstars, where he defeated enhancement talent Tony Williams. His last appearance on WWF television was at In Your House 5, when he was booked to wrestle Ahmed Johnson. According to the storyline, his back was not in wrestling condition, so he introduced Buddy Landel as his substitute, who was subsequently defeated by Johnson in just forty-two seconds. His very last day working in WWF was at Madison Square Garden where he was diagnosed with a severe muscle spasm in his back that if agitated could have paralyzed him. Despite doctors telling Vince McMahon it was a legitimate injury, Vince became angry at the news and tried to intimidate Shane into denying it, and was explicitly told by Vince McMahon to leave the company on January 1, 1996. However, Vince made him go out that evening and deliver a promo, in which he announced his injury. Douglas has been very outspoken about how Vince paid him much less than what was agreed upon, and because of his treatment before he refuses to ever work for Vince again.

=== Return to ECW (1996–1999) ===
==== World Television Champion (1996) ====
After leaving the WWF, Douglas made his surprise return to ECW at the House Party event on January 5, 1996, where he briefly reprised his Dean Douglas character, correcting Buh Buh Ray Dudley's grammar after a match, thus becoming a fan favorite. His televised return aired on the January 9 episode of Hardcore TV, where he confronted Stevie Richards and Blue Meanie, denounced his Dean gimmick and declared "the Franchise is back!". During this time, he had a memorable feud with Cactus Jack as Cactus was getting ready to leave for WWF and cutting promos encouraging Tommy Dreamer to side with him, deriding ECW's hardcore style and promoting clean wrestling. Douglas eventually pinned Jack in a match at CyberSlam after performing a drop toe-hold onto an opened steel chair after Jack's partner Mikey Whipwreck betrayed Jack. Upon his return, Douglas also targeted the World Heavyweight Champion Raven and received several title shots but came up short due to heavy interference by members of Raven's Flock.

After failing in his attempts to regain the World Heavyweight Championship, Douglas won the World Television Championship from 2 Cold Scorpio at A Matter of Respect and eventually turned into a villain by showing disrespect to the title. After the match, 2 Cold Scorpio attacked him. A month later, Douglas was scheduled to defend the title against Scorpio at Fight The Power, but Scorpio was injured, which resulted in Douglas retaining the title against El Puerto Ricano, Don E. Allen, Devon Storm and Mikey Whipwreck in quick succession before losing it to Pitbull #2 after Douglas insulted The Pitbulls' manager, Francine and gave her a belly to belly suplex. At Heat Wave, Douglas won his second World Television Championship by defeating champion Chris Jericho, 2 Cold Scorpio and Pitbull #2 in a four corners match, after Francine turned on them and aided Douglas in winning the match. With Francine by his side, Douglas continued to feud with Pitbull #2 and retained his title against the latter in subsequent rematches for the remainder of the year.

==== Triple Threat reformation and final storylines (1996–1999) ====
In the fall of 1996, Douglas reformed The Triple Threat with new members Chris Candido and Brian Lee. Douglas and Francine entered a feud with Tommy Dreamer and Beulah McGillicutty, which culminated in a series of matches between the two pairs throughout late 1996 and early 1997.

Triple Threat feuded with Douglas' enemies Tommy Dreamer and The Pitbulls throughout the first half of 1997, while Douglas continued his successful title defenses of the World Television Championship against Pitbull #2. Douglas retained his title against Pitbull #1, as well, in an "I Quit" match at Hostile City Showdown. During this time, a mysterious man began stalking Francine and displayed mannerisms of Rick Rude. After Douglas retained his title against Pitbull #2 at ECW's first pay-per-view Barely Legal, Brian Lee revealed himself to be the mysterious stalker and delivered a Chokeslam to Douglas. As a result, Lee was removed from Triple Threat due to his betrayal and left ECW. Triple Threat gained Bam Bam Bigelow in Lee's place, who joined the group as Douglas' partner in a tag team match against The Pitbulls at Chapter 2.

At Wrestlepalooza, Douglas retained his title against Chris Chetti. Later that night, Douglas interrupted Taz's promo after a match between Taz and Sabu. Douglas defended his title against Taz, with the stipulation that Taz would not be able to compete in ECW for sixty days. Douglas lost the title in under three minutes after Taz made him submit to the Tazmission. Douglas' reign ended at 329 days. He then turned his attention on capturing the World Heavyweight Championship from Terry Funk and challenged him for the title at Heat Wave but lost by disqualification. Douglas received another shot on the August 14 episode of Hardcore TV, but lost. Shortly after, Sabu won the title but Douglas remained in the title picture. At Hardcore Heaven, Douglas defeated Sabu and Funk in a three-way dance to win the title for the third time. In September 1997, Douglas retained the title against Tommy Dreamer at Terry Funk's WrestleFest and against Phil Lafon in a no disqualification match at As Good as It Gets.

Douglas lost his title to Bam Bam Bigelow on the October 24 episode of Hardcore TV after Rick Rude chose Bigelow as Douglas' challenger. As a result, Bigelow was kicked out of Triple Threat and replaced by Lance Storm. After failing in a rematch at Ultimate Jeopardy, Douglas regained the title by defeating Bigelow at the November to Remember pay-per-view, beginning his fourth reign as champion. Douglas was injured in the match and was sidelined for nearly two months, making his return to action on January 30, 1998. At Hostile City Showdown, Bigelow rejoined Triple Threat by turning on his partner Taz during a match against Triple Threat. Bigelow's return lead to Lance Storm being kicked out of the group, which began a feud between Storm and the Triple Threat. At Living Dangerously, Douglas and Chris Candido faced Storm and his mystery partner, who was revealed to be Al Snow. Snow pinned Douglas following a Snow Plow. This earned Snow a title shot against Douglas for the world title at Wrestlepalooza, where Douglas retained the title.

Douglas suffered an injury which prevented him from competing for a couple of months but he continued to appear on television, during which Triple Threat began feuding with Taz, Rob Van Dam and Sabu. The two teams squared off in a match at November to Remember, where Triple Threat lost. After the match, Bigelow left ECW and Chris Candido abandoned Douglas, resulting in Triple Threat being disbanded.

Douglas continued his feud with Taz, which culminated in a match between the two at Guilty as Charged in 1999, where Douglas lost the ECW World Heavyweight Championship to Taz after Douglas was attacked by former teammate Chris Candido, allowing Taz to win with a Tazmission. Douglas' fourth ECW World Heavyweight Championship reign was the longest reign in the title's history, lasting 406 days. Douglas faced Taz in a rematch for the World Heavyweight Championship at House Party, where he lost. On February 12 at Crossing the Line '99, Douglas allied with his long-time nemesis Tommy Dreamer to feud with Impact Players after both men claimed to be the "New Franchise" but Douglas elected Dreamer as his successor, turning Douglas face for the first time in nearly 3 years. After the face turn, Douglas would perform in a heroic role for the first since he disrespected the ECW Television title in 1996 and continued to feud with the Impact Players. At Living Dangerously, Dreamer and Douglas defeated Impact Players. Douglas wrestled his last match in ECW on April 15, where he defeated Justin Credible after a Pittsburgh Plunge. On May 15, Douglas was scheduled to represent ECW on the interpromotional Break the Barrier event. However, after a disagreement with Paul Heyman, Douglas delivered a controversial shoot promo at the event which ended with him quitting ECW one day before its Hardcore Heaven pay-per-view.

=== Second return to WCW (1999–2001) ===
==== The Revolution and New Blood (1999–2000) ====
After quitting ECW, Douglas made a surprise return to WCW on the July 19, 1999, episode of Nitro, where he joined with former Triple Threat members Chris Benoit and Dean Malenko and fellow ECW alumnus Perry Saturn to form The Revolution and pledged to cut the "cancer" out of WCW. This was a reference to Ric Flair, with whom Douglas had an off-screen grudge. Asya was later added to the group in place of Benoit, who left the team. The group wrestled other groups including West Texas Rednecks, First Family, Filthy Animals, and Varsity Club during its run. The group was rarely featured prominently and never really challenged the dominant wrestlers of WCW. This led to them never really getting popular as an idea, though both Benoit and Malenko were successful individually. The lack of success would eventually lead to the demise of the group after Malenko and Saturn left WCW. Following the disbanding of the Revolution, Douglas managed The Wall at the Souled Out pay-per-view in 2000, before taking a hiatus from television as the company did not have any plans for him at the time.

Douglas returned to WCW television on the April 10 episode of Nitro, where he aligned himself with Vince Russo and joined The New Blood group run by Russo and Eric Bischoff, which feuded with the older established The Millionaire's Club, which included his on-screen and real life off-camera nemesis Ric Flair. Douglas faced Flair for the first time on that same night in a match, which Douglas lost by disqualification. At Spring Stampede, Douglas was paired with Buff Bagwell in a four-team tournament for the vacated World Tag Team Championship, where they defeated Harlem Heat 2000 in the semi-finals and the makeshift team of Ric Flair and Lex Luger in the finals, after Brian Adams and Bryan Clark delivered a High Times. Douglas resumed his feud with Flair, which culminated in a match between the two at Slamboree, which Douglas won, with the help of Flair's son David Flair in disguise of a masked man. On the May 15 episode of Nitro, Douglas defended the tag title alongside The Wall, who substituted for Buff Bagwell in a match against KroniK, which KroniK won.

Douglas received an opportunity for the World Heavyweight Championship against Jeff Jarrett on the May 31 episode of Thunder, where he failed to win the title after the WCW Commissioner Ernest Miller delivered a Feliner to Douglas. Douglas competed against The Wall in a Best of Five Tables match at The Great American Bash, which Douglas won by driving Wall through three tables.

==== Return of The Franchise and United States Champion (2000–2001) ====
At Bash at the Beach, Douglas defeated his former tag team partner Buff Bagwell, by debuting his new finishing move called Franchiser and with assistance by Torrie Wilson, who turned on Bagwell. With Wilson as his manager, Douglas began using his ECW nickname "The Franchise" and began using "Cut the damn music!" catchphrase during his entrance to the ring and then delivered a promo on the microphone. Douglas participated in a tournament for the vacated United States Heavyweight Championship on the July 18 episode of Monday Nitro, where he defeated Billy Kidman in the quarter-finals but lost to eventual winner Lance Storm in the semi-finals.

Douglas would begin a rivalry with Kidman, who had previously been aligned with Torrie Wilson. During this rivalry, Kidman notably displayed footage of a supposed sex tape between Douglas and Wilson, in which Douglas suffered erectile dysfunction. This led to a "Viagra on a Pole" match, which Douglas won. At the New Blood Rising pay-per-view, Kidman defeated Douglas in a Strap match. However, Douglas and Torrie Wilson defeated Kidman and Madusa in a scaffold match at Fall Brawl.

In the fall of 2000, Douglas became allied with the Natural Born Thrillers, during which he helped their leader Mike Sanders win a kickboxing match against Ernest Miller at Halloween Havoc, which lead to Douglas facing Miller in a match at Mayhem, which Miller won. Douglas would then enter a rivalry with Misfits in Action leader General Rection over Rection's United States Heavyweight Championship. He faced Rection for the title at Starrcade, but lost by disqualification after Chavo Guerrero Jr. informed the referee that Douglas was trying to use a chain to hit Rection. In 2001, Douglas defeated Rection in a first blood chain match to capture the title at the Sin pay-per-view. Douglas dropped the belt to Rick Steiner on the February 5 episode of Nitro. This was Douglas' last WCW match in the company and he sat out the rest of his WCW contract until it was purchased by the WWF on March 23, 2001. After WCW closed down, Douglas refused to return to the WWF because of paternity leave due to his wife's pregnancy.

=== Major League Wrestling and Xtreme Pro Wrestling (2002–2003) ===
After the WWF purchased both WCW and ECW in 2001, Douglas participated in the inaugural Major League Wrestling event Genesis, where he won the tournament to crown the inaugural MLW World Heavyweight Championship. In similar fashion to his throwing down of the NWA World Championship, he discarded the MLW Championship. The company went on hiatus shortly thereafter and does not recognize Douglas's inaugural reign.

Douglas went to Xtreme Pro Wrestling in July 2002, where he won its World Heavyweight Championship after defeating Johnny Webb at the Night of Champions event. Douglas later helped expand the promotion from its base in Los Angeles to Philadelphia, and XPW held its first show in Philadelphia on August 31. Douglas would later become the final World Heavyweight Champion in XPW history, as the promotion held its final event on March 8, 2003, in his hometown of Pittsburgh.

=== NWA Total Nonstop Action / Total Nonstop Action Wrestling (2003–2007, 2009) ===
==== The New Church and The New Franchise (2003–2004) ====
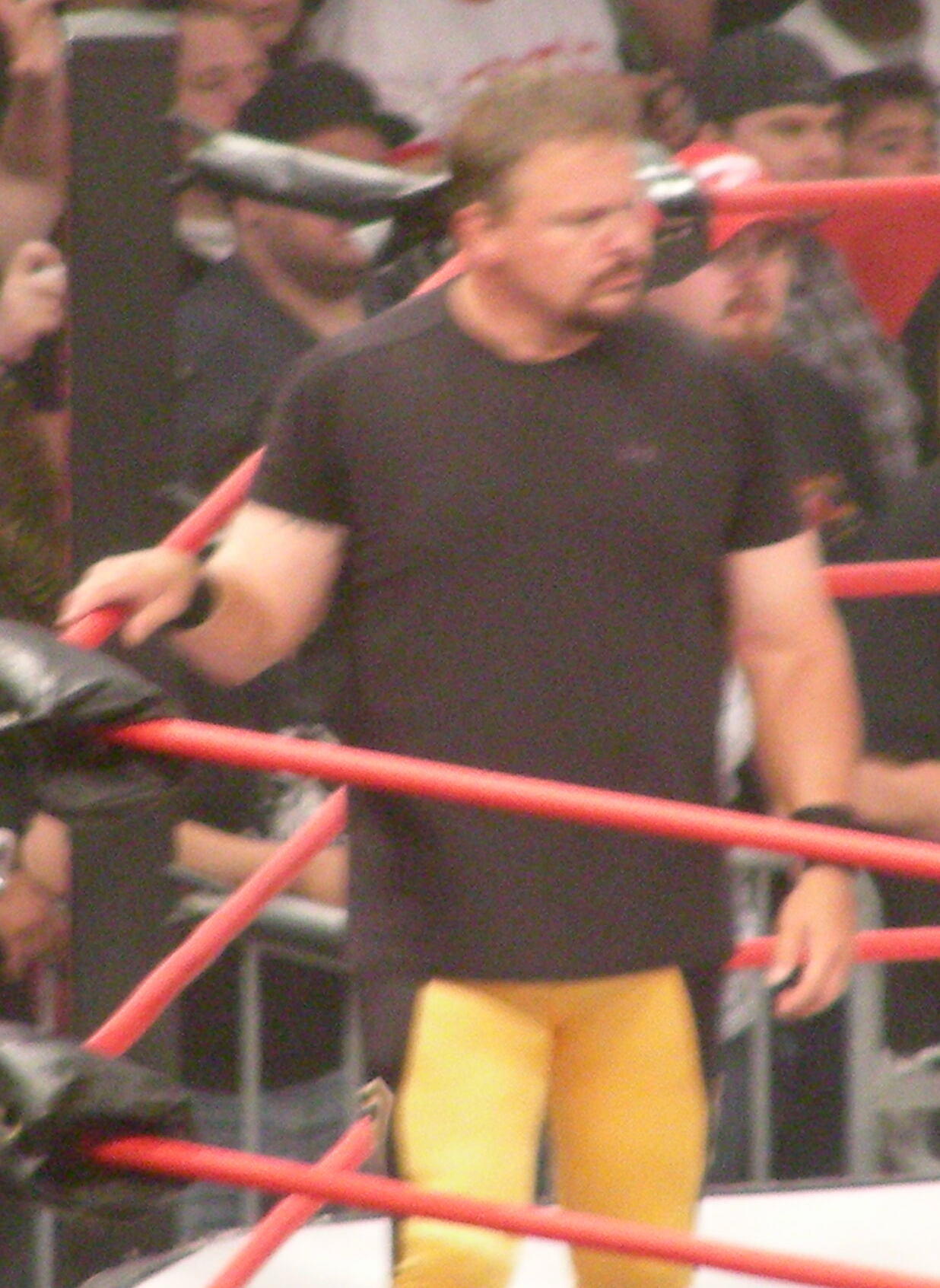
Douglas prior to his match at Slammiversary in June 2009

Following the closure of XPW, Martin signed with NWA Total Nonstop Action (NWA TNA) in June 2003. Under his Shane Douglas ring name, he debuted in TNA on the company's weekly pay-per-view on June 11, where he immediately reignited his feud with Raven by costing him an opportunity for the NWA World Heavyweight Championship. The two ended up joining separate factions as Douglas became a member of The New Church and Raven formed The Gathering. Douglas made his TNA in-ring debut on July 2, where he defeated CM Punk in a Clockwork Orange House of Fun match. Douglas and Raven clashed throughout the summer of 2003, with both men trading wins in a couple of matches.

When this feud ran down, Douglas broke away from The New Church on October 1 and began a quest to find "The New Franchise". He was joined by Tracy as his new valet after his match against Sandman on November 5 and Michael Shane was introduced as Douglas' protege and the trio formed their new group called "The New Franchise" on November 26. Douglas took him under his wing throughout the end of 2003 and beginning of 2004, as the two joined the company's tag team division. The duo were entered into a tournament for the vacated NWA World Tag Team Championship, where they lost to Christopher Daniels and Low Ki on March 24. The following week, Douglas and Shane participated in a four-way tag team match to receive a shot at the tag team titles, but came up short. On May 5, Shane turned on Douglas and the two squared off in a match, which Douglas won. After the match, Traci joined Shane to abandon Douglas.

==== Various roles and managing The Naturals (2004–2007) ====
When the grouping of Shane and Douglas broke up, Douglas went into a semi-in-ring retirement. He became an onscreen commentator and interviewer for TNA's new weekly television show, Impact!, and their monthly pay-per-views. In addition to this on-screen role, he worked backstage as a road agent and took a few independent bookings.

Douglas returned to television on the May 18, 2006, episode of Impact!, appearing on the entrance ramp as Andy Douglas (no relation) made the save for his tag team partner Chase Stevens after a brutal squash match against Samoa Joe. He would scout The Naturals again on the May 25 episode of Impact!, when Andy Douglas lost his match. A few weeks later, on June 15, Shane confronted them on their recent losing streak and their squandered talent, referring to their former manager and Douglas's ex-Triple Threat teammate Chris Candido in the process. He offered to become their manager, which they accepted. During the promo when he offered his services, he spoke his true feelings on World Wrestling Entertainment's revival of Extreme Championship Wrestling, admonishing Vince McMahon for "exploiting the memory" of the company he helped build nearly 15 years earlier. After becoming their mentor, pre-recorded videos showed Douglas training The Naturals have been shown on TNA programming, though he doesn't stand at ringside during their matches like most other managers. Once they were deemed ready for competition, Douglas billed them as "The Newly Franchised Naturals".

On the December 21 episode of Impact! after The Naturals lost to Team 3D in a tables match, a fed up Douglas turned his back on them, claiming that his experiment was over. Despite the failed "experiment", prior to the departure of The Naturals from TNA, Chase Stevens was featured in a match on the pre-show of the Final Resolution pay-per-view in 2007. During the match, Stevens wore the gold-and-black "Franchised" Naturals attire. Douglas came out after his match to heatedly confront Stevens about wearing his colors, leading to an in-ring confrontation between the two. After the angle was dropped, Douglas remained completely unseen on TNA programming. On October 10, 2007, TNA announced that Douglas was released from his TNA contract.

==== Feud with Christopher Daniels (2009) ====
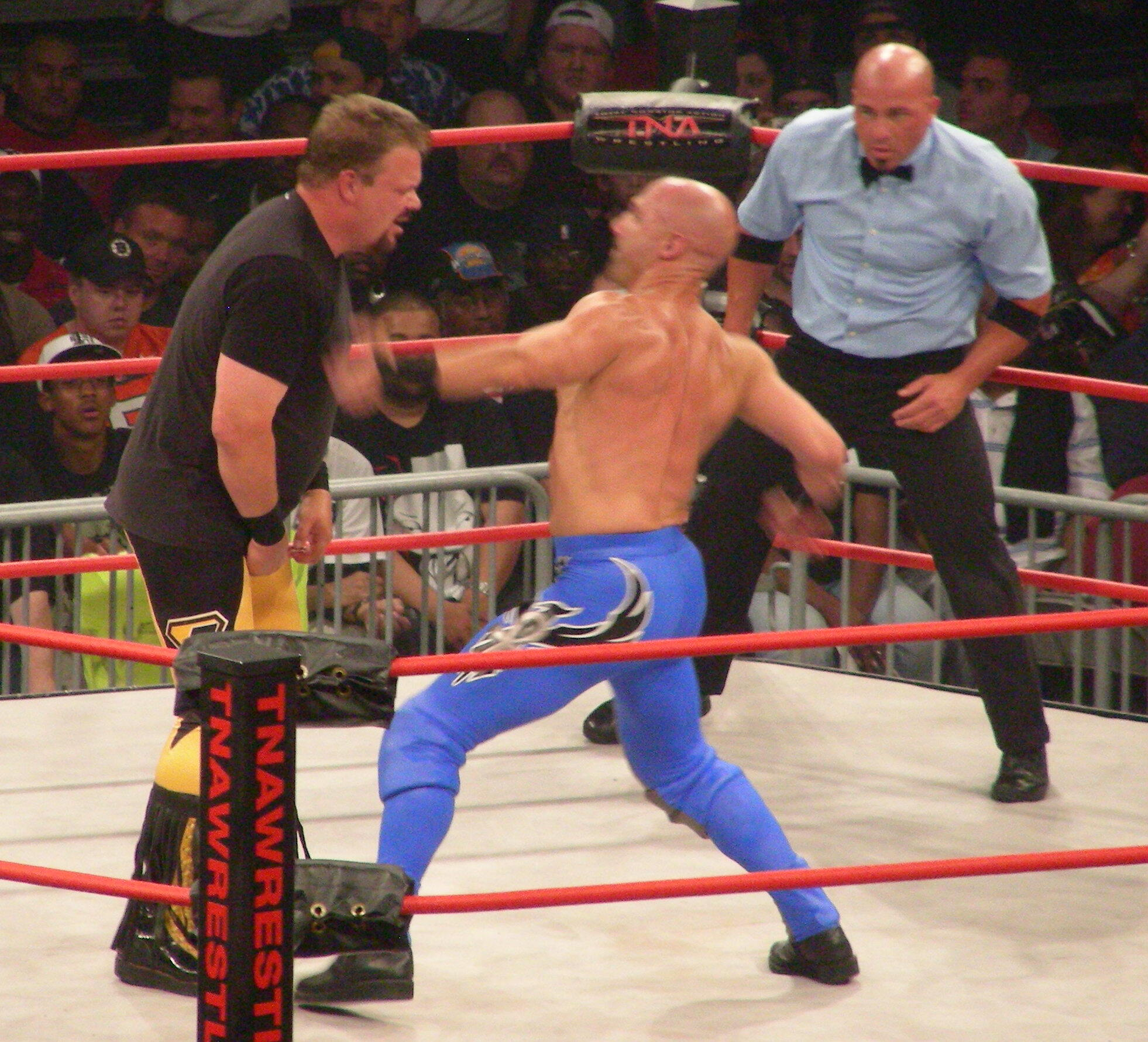
Douglas (left) wrestling Christopher Daniels at Slammiversary in June 2009 for a new contract with TNA

On the May 28, 2009, episode of Impact!, Douglas returned to TNA and attacked Christopher Daniels after his match with A.J. Styles. The following week on Impact!, Douglas again attacked Daniels during his match before subsequently stating that he wanted a second chance in TNA like Daniels received, after the latter was, in storyline, fired from TNA. He was granted a second chance on the June 11 episode of Impact!, where he was given a match with A.J. Styles which he lost, only to attack Styles after the match. Daniels would come out to help Styles, only to have Douglas hit him with a towel containing a pair of handcuffs. At the Slammiversary pay-per-view, Douglas lost to Daniels in a second chance match, resulting in Daniels retaining his spot on the TNA roster. Following the match, Douglas left TNA once again, although asked by TNA to participate in their ECW reunion show Hardcore Justice, he refused the invitation.

=== Late career (2009–present) ===
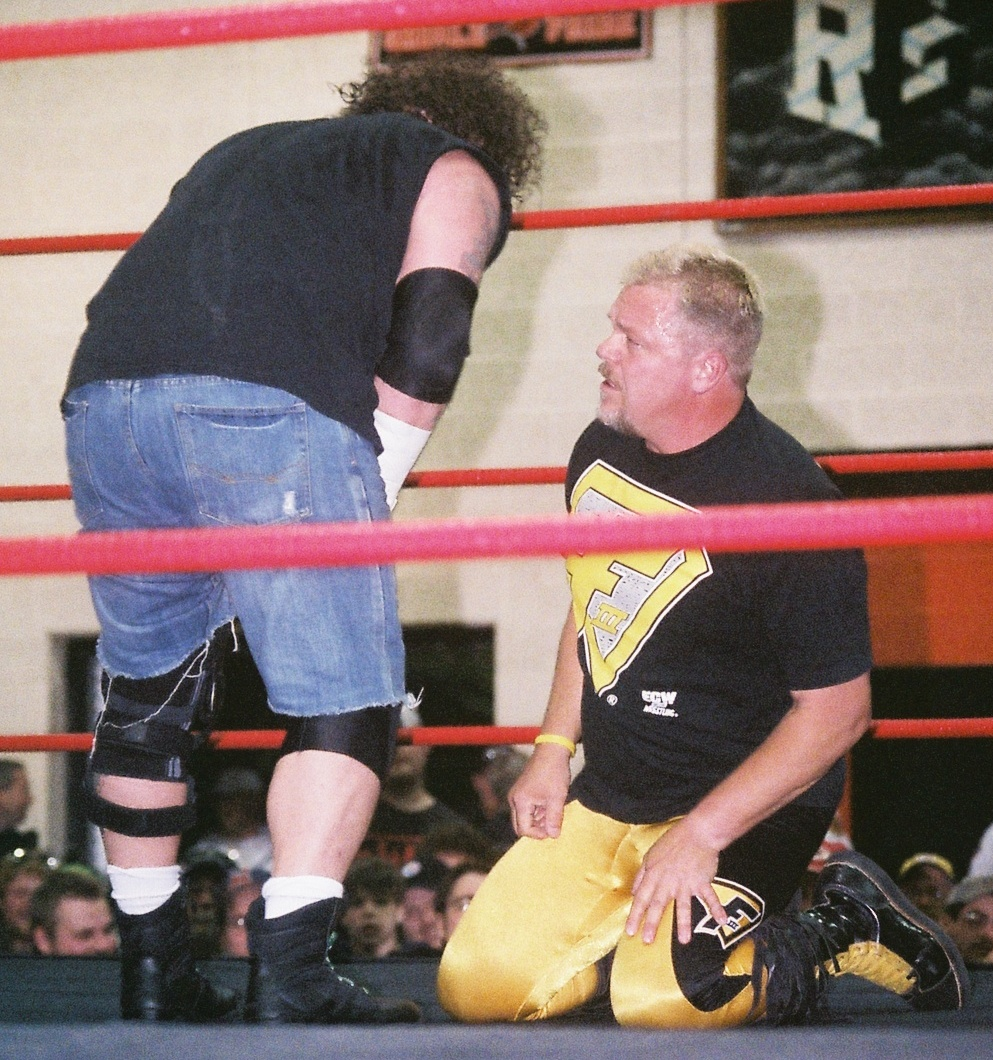
Douglas (kneeling) wrestling against Raven in April 2010

On March 14, 2009, Douglas returned to the National Wrestling Alliance (NWA) for the first time since he dropped the NWA World Heavyweight Championship in 15 years, wrestling for the NWA On Fire territory in a singles match, and defeating ECW alumnus Little Guido.

In 2012, Douglas announced that he would take part in Extreme Reunion, an event consisting of former ECW Originals. It was the first in a series of three events. The event was held on April 28 in the National Guard Armory of Philadelphia. The second event, Extreme Rising, was held on June 29 in New York and on June 30 in Philadelphia. There was a third show promoted by the same group, held on November 17 in Pittsburgh called Remember November. In the main event Douglas wrestled Matt Hardy to a no-contest.

On March 24, 2017, at a Pro Wrestling All-Stars of Detroit event, Douglas defeated The Great Akuma in Melvindale, Michigan, to become the Pro Wrestling All-Stars Heavyweight Champion. On April 21, Douglas defeated Paul Bowser by countout in an Extreme Rules match to successfully defend the title. He lost the title on May 12, 2017, when Breyer Wellington beat Douglas, Paul Bowser, and Atlas Hytower in a Fatal Four-Way match.

On May 13, 2017, at XICW Best In Detroit 20 in Clinton Township, Michigan, Douglas beat Joe Coleman to become the XICW Xtreme Intense Champion.

On March 3, 2018, at the World BigTime Wrestling (WBW) Extreme Warfare event in Lucas County, Ohio, Douglas defeated Shawn Blaze for the WBW Heavyweight Championship. He lost the belt back to Blaze on May 5, 2018, after the WBW commissioner interfered with the match. Douglas also feuded with Bobby Fulton, squaring off against the former Fantastic in a series of hardcore matches.

On March 11, 2018, at XICW March Madness & Mayhem in Fraser, Michigan, Shane Douglas lost the XICW Xtreme Intense Title to Kongo Kong.

On June 28, 2025, Douglas debuted for Tighten The Turnbuckle Wrestling, teaming with Chrisifix Greek to defeat Evan Golden and Bryan Montgomery in Johnson City, Tennessee.

== Booking and promoting ==
Douglas was a booker for the Xtreme Pro Wrestling (XPW) promotion during the 2000s. Under his directive, XPW moved from California to Philadelphia and featured many former Extreme Championship Wrestling (ECW) stars.

In mid-2005, Douglas conceived and, alongside Jeremy Borash, promoted and booked Hardcore Homecoming, a series of reunion events. The first event occurred on June 10, two days before World Wrestling Entertainment's own ECW reunion show, ECW One Night Stand. Hardcore Homecoming's final show occurred on November 5.

On April 9, 2009, it was announced that Douglas and Nite Owl Production were to promote a follow-up to Hardcore Homecoming called November to Remember: The Final Chair Shot. Originally, the event was to occur on June 10, 2008, the anniversary of the original Hardcore Homecoming event, but the date was rescheduled to 2009 to coincide with an American Cancer Society charity event hosted by Douglas' former valet Francine.

In 2012, Douglas founded the Extreme Reunion (later Extreme Rising) promotion. Douglas was scheduled to headline an Extreme Reunion event scheduled for April 28, 2012. Unbeknownst to WWE, Douglas appeared in the audience on the March 19, 2012, episode of Raw to promote the event, but was escorted out of the arena by security after causing a disturbance. Extreme Rising closed in 2014.

== Personal life ==
In 1993 during his first stint with World Championship Wrestling, he began teaching emotional support classes, economics, and the history of the United States at Beaver Area High School. While not wrestling, Martin works as a motivational speaker.

Martin married Michelle Burke on August 17, 1987. They divorced on November 24, 1994. Five years later, Martin married Carla Marie Reeves on August 14, 1999. Their first son, Connor, was born in April 2001, and their second son, Caden Andrew, was born on December 6, 2005. Soon after his second son was born, Martin checked himself into a drug rehabilitation program due to a painkiller addiction. Since 2006, Martin has remained drug-free. He discussed this on Steve Austin's podcast during a two-part episode in April 2015. Martin and his wife divorced in 2017.

Martin produced, choreographed and played himself in the 2013 film Pro Wrestlers vs Zombies.

In July 2016, Martin was named part of a class action lawsuit filed against WWE which alleged that wrestlers incurred traumatic brain injuries during their tenure and that the company concealed the risks of injury. The suit was litigated by attorney Konstantine Kyros, who has been involved in a number of other lawsuits against WWE. The lawsuit was dismissed by US District Judge Vanessa Lynne Bryant in September 2018.

== Championships and accomplishments ==
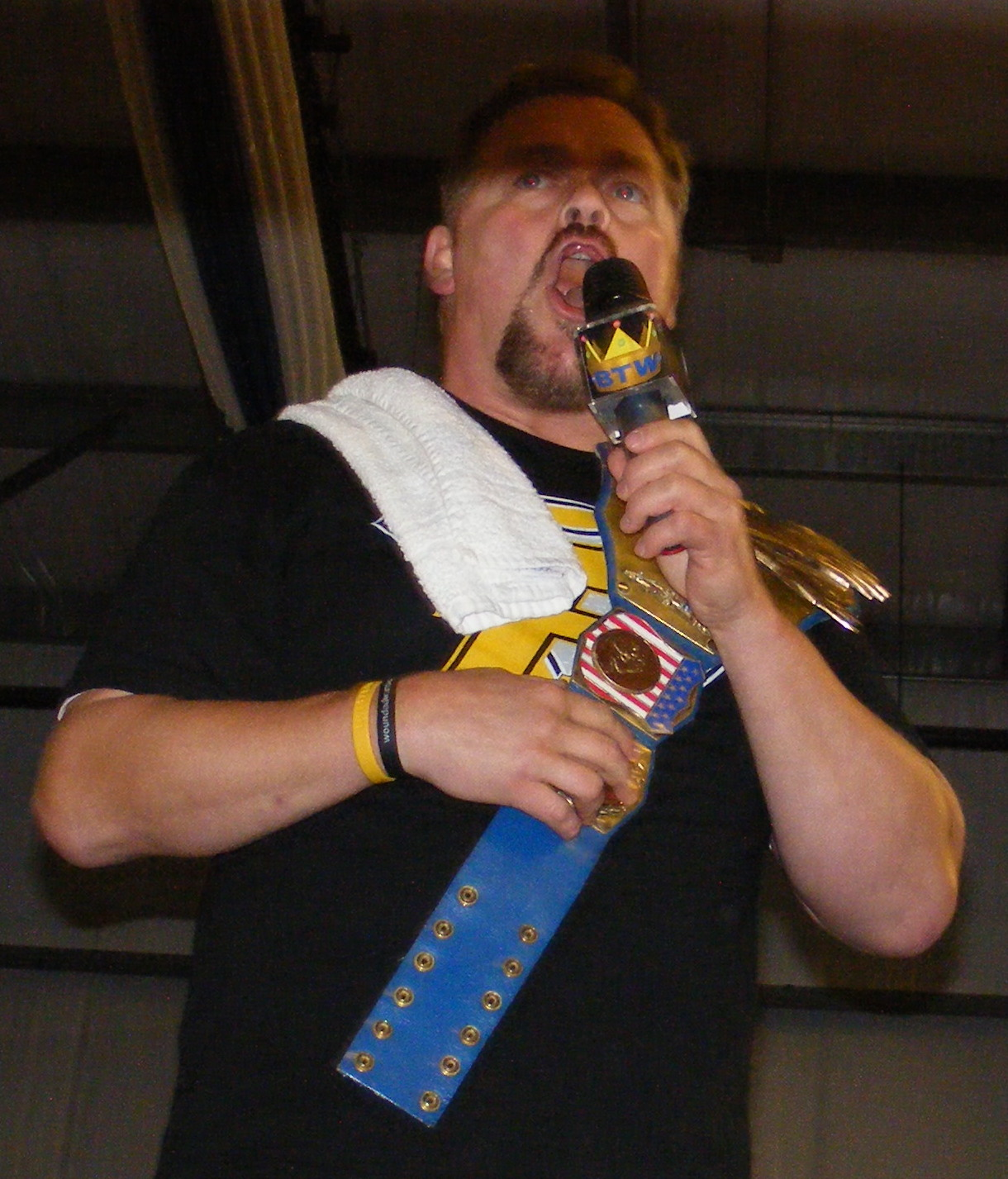
Douglas as BTW Heavyweight Champion in March 2011

- American Pro Wrestling Alliance
  - APWA World Heavyweight Championship (1 time)
- Appalachian Championship Wrestling
  - ACW Tag Team Championship (1 time) - with Shane Storm
  - ACW Six Man/Bluegrass Con Tag Team Championship (1 time) - with Chris Cannon and Nick Hamrick
- Big Time Wrestling (Massachusetts)
  - BTW Heavyweight Championship (2 times)
- Blue Water Championship Wrestling
  - BWCW Heavyweight Championship (1 time)
- Border City Wrestling
  - BCW Can-Am Heavyweight Championship (1 time)
- Busted Knuckle Pro Wrestling
  - BKPW Heavyweight Championship (1 time)
- Eastern Championship Wrestling / Extreme Championship Wrestling
  - ECW World Heavyweight Championship (4 times)^{1}
  - ECW World Television Championship (2 times)
  - NWA World Heavyweight Championship (1 time)
  - NWA World Title Tournament (1994)
- Hardcore Hall of Fame
  - Class of 2014
- H2O Wrestling: Hardcore Hustle Organization
  - H2O Heavyweight Championship (1 time)
- International Wrestling Association
  - IWA Heavyweight Championship (1 time)
- Lancaster Championship Wrestling/ Keystone Pro Wrestling
  - LCW Heavyweight Championship (1 time)
- Live Pro Wrestling
  - LPW Tag Team Championship (1 time) - with Tommy Ace
- Major League Wrestling
  - MLW Championship (1 time, inaugural, unrecognized)
  - MLW Championship tournament (2002)
- National Championship Wrestling
  - NCW Heavyweight Championship (1 time)
- NEOPro Wrestling
  - NEOPro Tag Team Championship (1 time) - with Wilbur Whitlock
- North American Wrestling Alliance
  - NAWA Heavyweight Championship (1 time)
- Pro Championship Wrestling
  - PCW Heavyweight Championship (1 time)
- Pro Wrestling All-Stars Of Detroit
  - PWASD Heavyweight Championship (1 time)
- Pro Wrestling Illustrated
  - PWI ranked him #20 of the 500 best singles wrestlers of the year in the PWI 500 in 1996
  - PWI ranked him #118 of the 500 best singles wrestlers of the "PWI Years" in 2003
  - PWI ranked him #82 of the 100 best tag teams of the "PWI Years" with Ricky Steamboat in 2003
- Pro Wrestling Uncensored
  - PWU Heavyweight Championship (1 time)
- Pro Wrestling eXpress
  - PWX Heavyweight Championship (1 time)
- Pro Wrestling WORLD-1
  - WORLD-1 Television Championship (1 time)
- Southeastern Championship Wrestling
  - NWA Continental Tag Team Championship (1 time) – with Lord Humongous
- Superstar Wrestling Federation
  - SWF Heavyweight Championship (1 time)
- USA Pro Wrestling
  - USA Pro Wrestling Heavyweight Championship (1 time)
- United States Wrestling League
  - USWL Unified World Heavyweight Championship (1 time)
- Universal Wrestling Federation
  - UWF World Television Championship (1 time)
- Universal Championship Wrestling
  - UCW Universal Heavyweight Championship (1 time)
- World Championship Wrestling
  - WCW Hardcore Championship (1 time)
  - WCW United States Heavyweight Championship (1 time)
  - WCW World Tag Team Championship (2 times) – with Ricky Steamboat (1) and Buff Bagwell (1)
  - NWA World Tag Team Championship (1 time) – with Ricky Steamboat
- World Classic Professional Big Time Wrestling
  - WCPBTW Legends American Grand Prix Championship (1 time)
  - XPW Heavyweight Championship (1 time)
- World Wrestling Federation
  - WWF Intercontinental Championship (1 time)
- Xtreme Intense Championship Wrestling
  - XICW Xtreme Intense Championship (1 time)
- Xtreme Pro Wrestling
  - XPW World Heavyweight Championship (1 time)
- Other championships
  - Tri-Cities Tag Team Championship (1 time) – with Mick Foley

^{1}Douglas' twice won the title while the promotion was a National Wrestling Alliance-affiliate named Eastern Championship Wrestling. During his second reign, the promotion was renamed Extreme Championship Wrestling. Douglas held the title an additional two times after these events.

== Luchas de Apuestas record ==
| Winner (wager) | Loser (wager) | Location | Event | Date | Notes |
|---|---|---|---|---|---|
| Shane Douglas (hair) | Raven (hair) | Nashville, Tennessee | NWA TNA Weekly PPV #63 | September 17, 2003 | |

== See also ==
- Extreme Rising
- NWA World Title Tournament
- The Revolution
- The Triple Threat
