= Brian Lee (wrestler) =

American professional wrestler (born 1966)

Personal information
- Born: Brian Lee Harris; November 26, 1966 (age 59) St. Petersburg, Florida, U.S.
- Spouse: Martee Warner (m. 2015)

Professional wrestling career
- Ring name(s): Brian Lee; Prime Time; Undertaker; Chainz
- Billed height: 6 ft 7 in (201 cm)
- Billed weight: 286 lb (130 kg)
- Debut: 1988
- Retired: June 27, 2014

Brian Lee Harris (born November 26, 1966) is an American retired professional wrestler. He is best known for his appearances with Extreme Championship Wrestling, Smoky Mountain Wrestling, and Total Nonstop Action Wrestling under the ring name Brian Lee and with the World Wrestling Federation as Chainz and an impersonator version of The Undertaker.

Lee enjoyed most of his success in SMW, becoming the promotion's inaugural Heavyweight Champion in 1992, winning it a total of two times. He also held the Tag Team Championship and the Beat the Champ Television Championship twice each and was a mainstay of the promotion throughout its existence between 1991 and 1995.

== Professional wrestling career ==
=== Early career (1988–1991) ===
Brian Lee made his debut in 1988 for Jerry Jarrett's Continental Wrestling Association in Memphis, Tennessee. In 1989, the CWA merged with World Class Championship Wrestling to form United States Wrestling Association. He would remain with the USWA until 1991.

=== World Championship Wrestling (1990–1991) ===
Lee would make an initial appearance at a WCW taping on April 23, 1990, in Marietta, Georgia when he defeated Bob Cook. He made his television debut at Clash of the Champions XIII on November 20, 1990, losing to "Z-Man" Tom Zenk.

In November 1991 he returned to the promotion, this time teaming with Chris Sullivan. The duo were defeated by the combination of Diamond Dallas Page and The Diamond Studd in a match that would air on the December 7, 1991, edition of World Championship Wrestling.

=== World Wrestling Federation (1991–1992) ===
Lee made his first appearance at a TV taping for the World Wrestling Federation's Wrestling Challenge show, losing to Kevin Von Erich in a untelevised match. The match appeared to be a tryout for both wrestlers. Lee then wrestled in a dark match against Chris Walker the following day at the 1991 special Tuesday pay-per-view event This Tuesday in Texas, but lost the match. On October 28, 1992, Lee received another tryout at a Wrestling Challenge taping in Louisville, Kentucky and was defeated by Jim Powers.

=== Smoky Mountain Wrestling (1992-1995) ===
==== Heavyweight Champion and feud with Kevin Sullivan (1992–1994) ====
He appeared in Smoky Mountain Wrestling (SMW) as the promotion's mainstay from 1992 until 1995 as "Prime Time" Brian Lee. Lee appeared at SMW's first televised show on February 2, 1992, where he defeated Barry Horowitz in his first SMW match and was pushed as the company's top heroic character. He instantly began his first rivalry with Dutch Mantell, which culminated in a match between the two on April 4 episode of SMW TV, which Lee won to advance for the quarter-final round of a tournament to crown the promotion's first Heavyweight Champion. At Volunteer Slam, Lee defeated Buddy Landel, Dirty White Boy and Paul Orndorff to win the tournament and become the inaugural SMW Heavyweight Champion. Lee would retain the title against the likes of Barry Horowitz, Dirty White Boy and Buddy Landel while getting involved in a rivalry with Dirty White Boy and Paul Orndorff. At Summer Blast, Lee and Ron Garvin defeated the team of Orndorff and Dirty White Boy in a tag team match. Lee lost the title to Dirty White Boy after interference by Mongolian Mauler at Fire on the Mountain, ending his reign at 78 days. For the next two months, a mystery assailant named "The Master" sent several wrestlers after Lee and issued a $10,000 bounty over Lee's head until Master was revealed to be Kevin Sullivan on the November 7 episode of SMW TV. Lee had a lengthy rivalry with Sullivan that culminated in a series of matches for the rest of 1992 until summer 1993. Lee defeated Sullivan in a Singapore Spike match at Bluegrass Brawl.

On the May 1 episode of SMW TV, Lee defeated Bobby Eaton to capture his first Beat the Champ Television Championship. Lee made his first successful title defense against Killer Kyle on the May 8 episode of SMW TV. At Volunteer Slam II, Lee defeated Stan Lane and then teamed with Rock 'n' Roll Express, Jimmy Golden and Robert Fuller to defeat the team of Kevin Sullivan, Killer Kyle, The Tazmaniac and The Heavenly Bodies (Stan Lane and Tom Prichard) in a Rage in a Cage match. Lee would then defeat Sullivan in a Singapore Spike match at The Last Tango in Tennessee to end the feud. Lee would then retain the Beat the Champ Television Championship in title defenses against Jimmy Golden, The Dirty White Boy, Paul Lee and finally Robbie Eagle on the June 19 episode of SMW TV, which resulted in Lee vacating the title after having won five consecutive title matches. After the match, Tracy Smothers interrupted an interview of Lee to cut his own promo which infuriated Lee.

On June 24, Lee defeated Jimmy Golden, Killer Kyle and Tracy Smothers to win the King of Kentucky tournament. On the June 26 episode of SMW TV, Lee turned into a villain for the first time in his SMW career by attacking Tracy Smothers after rescuing him from an assault by Kevin Sullivan and Jimmy Golden. He was joined by the debuting Tammy Fytch as his valet on the July 3 SMW TV. This led to a feud between Lee and Smothers, which led to Lee defeating Smothers to win his second Heavyweight Championship on the July 24 SMW TV. Lee made his first televised title defense against Tim Horner on the August 7 SMW TV, where he retained the title via a disqualification after Smothers attacked Lee. Lee would then retain the title against Smothers after losing via disqualification at Hot Night in Morristown and in a Coal Miner's Glove match at Fire on the Mountain. Lee would then successfully defend the title against Mongolian Stomper at K-Town Showdown and Bobby Blaze on the September 4 episode of SMW TV. He retained the title against the likes of Blaze, Smothers and The Dirty White Boy throughout the rest of the year and early 1994 until he lost the title to Dirty White Boy in a Chain match at Sunday Bloody Sunday on February 13, 1994. Lee would continue his feud with Dirty White Boy as Lee teamed with Fytch to take on Dirty White Boy and Dirty White Girl in a series of mixed tag team matches, which culminated in a street fight at Bluegrass Brawl II, which Lee and Fytch lost.

==== Beat the Champ Television Champion (1994–1995) ====
After losing the Heavyweight Championship, Lee formed a tag team with Tammy Sytch's other client Chris Candido and began feuding with the Tag Team Champions Rock 'n' Roll Express, which led to Lee and Candido defeating Rock 'n' Roll Express for the Tag Team Championship at a house show on April 23. Lee and Candido successfully defended the titles against Rock 'n' Roll Express in a no disqualification, no time limit match at Volunteer Slam III. On the July 16 episode of SMW TV, Lee unsuccessfully challenged Tracy Smothers for the Beat the Champ Television Championship. Lee and Candido dropped the titles back to Rock 'n' Roll Express at Night of Legends on August 5. However, the following night, at Fire on the Mountain, Lee and Candido defeated Rock 'n' Roll Express in a hair vs. hair match to win their second SMW Tag Team Championship. They successfully defended the titles against Rock 'n' Roll Express via disqualification at Battle of Beckley, before losing the title again to Rock 'n' Roll Express on the August 20 episode of SMW TV, after Candido accidentally attacked Lee. This led to a post-match confrontation in which Fytch blamed Lee for the loss and Candido turned on Lee by attacking him, which led to Lee turning back into a fan favorite.

Lee formed an alliance with Lance Storm and entered a brief feud with Candido and Boo Bradley and the two teams competed in a series of tag team matches. On the December 10 episode of SMW TV, Lee defeated The Nightmare to win the vacant Beat the Champ Television Championship for the second time. He successfully defended the title against Inferno Brimstone and D-Lo Brown, before losing the belt to Buddy Landel on December 31 episode of SMW TV. Lee then left SMW and began wrestling in the United States Wrestling Association (USWA). He made a one-off return to SMW at Fire on the Mountain on August 12, where he took on Brad Armstrong in a losing effort.

=== World Wrestling Federation (1994) ===
In 1994, he briefly returned to the World Wrestling Federation to perform as an impostor version of the Undertaker. "The Million Dollar Man" Ted DiBiase, who originally introduced Undertaker into the WWF at Survivor Series 1990, claimed to have found Undertaker, who disappeared after losing a casket match to Yokozuna at the 1994 Royal Rumble. Shortly after this, Lee began appearing dressed as Undertaker. DiBiase claimed that he had convinced the Undertaker to come back with his vast amounts of money and made him a member of his Million Dollar Corporation, with his powers now derived from DiBiase's riches instead of the urn that he or his manager, Paul Bearer, toted with him to the ring. For several weeks, Lee wrestled matches as the Undertaker, his debut being a victory over PJ Walker on the June 25, 1994, edition of WWF Superstars. Bearer "made contact" with the real Undertaker and promised to produce him at SummerSlam in August 1994. At the event, DiBiase's impostor Undertaker faced off against the actual Undertaker and was defeated. After the match, DiBiase fled from ringside while the Undertaker rolled the impostor into a casket that was taken away. Although the idea was for Lee to continue portraying the impostor Undertaker for some time afterward and to have more matches against the actual Undertaker, the WWF dropped the story after SummerSlam 1994.

After SummerSlam 1994, Lee returned to SMW and also returned to the United States Wrestling Association. It was in the USWA that he first teamed with his real life cousins, Ron and Don Harris, then known as the Bruise Brothers.

=== Extreme Championship Wrestling (1996–1997) ===
By early 1996, Lee began competing in Extreme Championship Wrestling. During this period, he went by the nicknames "Prime Time" Brian Lee, "Bulldozer" (or Bulldozer for Hire) and later "Killdozer" and was allied with Raven as a hired bodyguard for his stable.

Lee and Tommy Dreamer then got involved in a very violent and personal feud, which began through Dreamer's feud with Raven. At the ECW event Fight The Power on June 1, during a six-man tag match, Brian Lee chokeslammed Dreamer from the ECW balcony through three stacked tables, then pinned Dreamer for the win. The footage was frequently used during ECW's opening video montage.

On June 22, at Hardcore Heaven, after losing a singles match to Dreamer after Dreamer's valet Beulah McGillicutty got involved, Lee again chokeslammed Dreamer off a balcony through three tables. At Heat Wave, during a three on three "Rage in the Cage" tag team cage match, Lee again chokeslammed Dreamer, this time from the top of the cage through three tables set up on the outside by Raven's henchmen. On October 5 at Ultimate Jeopardy during a tag match also involving Sandman and Stevie Richards, Lee once again chokeslammed Dreamer from the ECW balcony, this time through four tables set up below.

At several house shows released on ECW Fan Cam, Lee and Dreamer had Falls Count Anywhere matches which resulted in the two men brawling in moving traffic outside the building. The feud culminated at High Incident, in the match Lee is most remembered for from his ECW tenure. During his Scaffold Match with Dreamer, Lee took a major bump from the scaffolding high above the ring through a series of tables stacked up inside the ring.

At November to Remember, the main event was a tag match pitting Dreamer with Terry Funk against Shane Douglas and Lee. From here, Lee began a feud with Funk, which lasted until 1997. Lee also became a part of the revived Triple Threat stable with Douglas and Chris Candido, while a masked man who was hinted at to be Rick Rude began stalking Douglas. At ECW's ECW Barely Legal, it was revealed that the masked man was Lee himself. He attacked Shane Douglas and kissed Francine before leaving the ring with Rick Rude. Lee left ECW soon after. His spot was subsequently taken by Bam Bam Bigelow.

=== World Wrestling Federation (1997–1998) ===
In June 1997, Lee returned to the WWF as a babyface and was renamed "Chainz", a member of the biker faction the Disciples of Apocalypse (or DOA) along with leader Crush and his cousins, the Harris Brothers, who were renamed Skull and 8-Ball. The reason Crush formed this faction was to get revenge on his former faction The Nation of Domination, whose leader Faarooq fired him. Chainz had his debut match on the June 28, 1997, edition of Shotgun Saturday Night tag teaming with Crush and defeating The Headbangers. Afterwards, the foursome continued feuding with The Nation of Domination and also feuded Los Boricuas and The Truth Commission during the WWF's "Gang Warz" storyline. Crush left the company at the end of November 1997 in protest of the Montreal Screwjob and believing he'd be better off in WCW, as they were winning the Monday Night War. After Crush left, Chainz became the new leader of the DOA. By February 1998, Chainz started doing singles matches, but still remained a member of the DOA with Skull and 8-Ball. For the Wrestlemania XIV tag team battle royal he teamed with Blackjack Bradshaw for one match, when Blackjack Bradshaw was feuding with his former partner Barry Windham, which led to Windham illegally interfering in the tag team battle royal and eliminating Chainz. After WrestleMania XIV, Chainz began being pushed down the card in singles matches, but kept occasionally teaming up with Skull and 8-Ball. The threesome entered a feud with the LOD 2000 and Droz. Chainz was fired for failing a drug test after his last WWF match, which was a loss to Val Venis on the June 15, 1998, episode of Raw Is War.

=== Independent circuit (1998–1999, 2002) ===
After being released from the WWF in June 1998, Brian Lee entered some independent companies in 1998, as Chainz. He entered New Breed Wrestling (NBW), where he and "Jackmaster" John Diamond defeated Primo Carnera III and Tony DeVito. He entered Lutte Familiale, for the company's Lutte 2000 event, where he defeated Brian Christopher. He entered American States Wrestling Alliance (ASWA), for the company's ASWA Vault event, where he defeated Jimmie Lee. He also entered New Dimension Wrestling (NDW), where he defeated The Dark Patriot.

On May 2, 1999, Brian Lee entered Pro Wrestling International as Chainz, where he had a match against Tatanka, which he lost by disqualification. On May 8, 1999, Brian Lee (as Chainz) and his manager Poindexter entered Universal Wrestling Council, where he wrestled Tom Brandi. Unfortunately he had a miscalculation with Poindexter and hit him by mistake, allowing Tom Brandi to roll Chainz up from behind and get a pinfall victory on him. After the match, Chainz beat up Poindexter, blaming him for the loss and fired him. Brian Lee (as Chainz) also was a regular for the company Championship Wrestling (CW), which was an independent wrestling company featuring appearances from up and coming wrestlers and wrestlers who were previously in big name companies. There were high profile wrestlers from major wrestling companies entering CW for one-off matches also. His first match in this company was on February 11, 1999, where he defeated Scott Stone and his last was on July 21, 1999, which was a double count-out with Vincent. Afterwards, Lee took a hiatus from wrestling.

On January 4, 2002, Brian Lee entered IWA Puerto Rico for the first night of their 3 night event IWA Histeria Boricua 2002 and had a match against Shane the Glamour Boy, which ended in a no contest. On January 6, 2002, Brian Lee (as Chainz) challenged Apolo for the IWA Undisputed World Heavyweight Championship on the third night of the 3 night event, but lost the match.

=== Total Nonstop Action Wrestling (2002–2003) ===
Brian Lee debuted in Total Nonstop Action Wrestling on August 14, 2002, when he tag teamed with David Young taking on America's Most Wanted ("Cowboy" James Storm and "Wildcat" Chris Harris) in a dark match on NWA-TNA Saturday morning, which they lost. He appeared on the same show the following week, in his first televised match in the company, where he tag teamed with Ron Harris, taking on America's Most Wanted, which they lost. He would tag team with Ron Harris for two more matches, which were two more losing efforts to America's Most Wanted, then the team disbanded. On October 30, 2002, he joined The Disciples of The New Church and formed a tag team with Slash, under the leadership of manager Father James Mitchell. In their debut match on November 6, 2002, they took on America's Most Wanted for the NWA World Tag Team Championship, but lost the match by disqualification. The following week, on November 13, 2002, they defeated America's Most Wanted and captured the NWA World Tag Team Championship from them and ended their undefeated streak. They later lost the titles back to America's Most Wanted on January 8, 2003. In his final match in the company, on July 30, 2003, he teamed with Slash and Shane Douglas, in a Falls Count Anywhere Clockwork Orange House of Fun match against Raven, Julio Dinero, and Alexis Laree, in which he and his team were victorious.

=== Later career (2003–2006, 2012, 2014) ===
After leaving Total Nonstop Action Wrestling, Brian Lee appeared from time to time on smaller independent events from 2003 to 2006.

Brian Lee appeared in a United States Wrestling Organization (USWO) match on August 17, 2012, tag teaming with Wolfie D defeating Damien Payne and Jocephus.

Brian Lee entered NWA Southern All-Star Wrestling in early 2014 and formed a tag team with Lee Condry, called The Prime Time Outlaws. They had their debut tag team match on March 7, 2014 (broadcast: March 9, 2014) on the company's Inferno TV show, which was a loss to NWA SAW Southern Tag Team Champions: Team IOU (Kerry Awful and Nick Iggy). On May 30, 2014, at the company's Collision Course event, they defeated Team IOU in a Double Dog Collar Match for the NWA SAW Southern Tag Team Championships. Their final tag team match was on June 27, 2014 (broadcast: July 6, 2014), where they lost the NWA SAW Southern Tag Championships to Weatherby Inc. (Cody Weatherby and Kevin Weatherby). Afterwards, Brian Lee left the company and retired from professional wrestling.

== Championships and accomplishments ==
- American Independent Wrestling Federation
  - AIWF World Heavyweight Championship (1 time)
- Continental Wrestling Association
  - CWA Heavyweight Championship (1 time)
  - CWA Tag Team Championship (2 times) – with Robert Fuller (1) and The Grappler (1)
- Continental Wrestling Federation
  - CWF Tag Team Championship (1 time) - with Jimmy Golden
- Eastern States Wrestling
  - ESW Heavyweight Champion (1 time)
- Pro Wrestling Illustrated
  - PWI ranked him # 41 of the top 500 singles wrestlers of the year in the PWI 500 in the year 1994
  - PWI ranked him # 476 of the 500 best singles wrestlers of the "PWI Years" in 2003
- NWA Southern All-Star Wrestling
  - NWA Southern Tag Team Championship (1 time) – Lee Condry
- Smoky Mountain Wrestling
  - SMW Beat the Champ Television Championship (2 times)
  - SMW Heavyweight Championship (2 times)
  - SMW Tag Team Championship (2 times) – with Chris Candido
  - SMW Heavyweight Championship Tournament (1992)
  - King of Kentucky (1993)
- Southeastern Championship Wrestling
  - NWA Southeast Tag Team Championship (1 time) – with Jimmy Golden
- Total Nonstop Action Wrestling
  - NWA World Tag Team Championship (1 time) – with Slash
- United States Wrestling Association
  - USWA Heavyweight Championship (2 times)
  - USWA Unified World Heavyweight Championship (2 times)
  - USWA World Tag Team Championship (4 times) – with Robert Fuller (3) and Don Harris (1)
  - USWA Southern Tag Team Championship Tournament (1989) - with Robert Fuller
- World Class Wrestling Association
  - WCWA World Tag Team Championship (1 time) – with Robert Fuller
- Wrestling Observer Newsletter
  - Worst Feud of the Year (1997) vs. Los Boricuas

== Filmography ==
Lee appeared in the Bollywood film Khiladiyon Ka Khiladi under "The Undertaker" name in 1996.
