= Return of the Funker =

1995 Extreme Championship Wrestling supercard event

- The ECW Arena
- Promotion: Extreme Championship Wrestling
- Date: February 25, 1995 (aired February 28, March 7 and March 14, 1995)
- City: Philadelphia, Pennsylvania, United States
- Venue: ECW Arena
- Attendance: 1,150

Event chronology
← Previous; Double Tables	Next → Extreme Warfare

Return of the Funker was a professional wrestling supercard event produced by Extreme Championship Wrestling (ECW). It took place on February 25, 1995 from the ECW Arena in Philadelphia, Pennsylvania in the United States. The commentator for the event was Joey Styles. Several of the bouts were broadcast on the February 28, March 7 and March 14 episodes of ECW Hardcore TV. The tag team match pitting Chris Benoit and Dean Malenko against Sabu and The Tazmaniac was featured on the 2001 Pioneer Entertainment compilation DVD Hardcore History.

The event was named for Terry Funk ("the Funker"), who returned to ECW at the end of the event having been absent since August 1994.

== Background ==
Chris Benoit had attacked Sabu after he and his partner, the Tazmaniac, had captured the ECW World Tag Team Championship from the Public Enemy at Double Tables earlier that month. This led to Benoit and his tag team partner, Dean Malenko, challenging Sabu and the Tazmaniac for the titles at Return of the Funker.

Raven had debuted in ECW in January 1995, with his henchman Stevie Richards revealing that Raven had a vendetta against Tommy Dreamer. At Double Tables earlier that month, Dreamer defeated Richards with Raven at ringside.

Cactus Jack had begun feuding with the Sandman in December 1994. At Double Tables, Cactus Jack had defeated the Sandman in a Texas death match, during which the Sandman had sustained a concussion. As the Sandman could not wrestle at Return of the Funker, his manager Woman had announced that Cactus Jack would face a mystery opponent.

The Bad Breed, Axl Rotten and Ian Rotten, had been forced to separate as a consequence of losing a bout to the Pitbulls in January 1995. Subsequently, the former tag team partners had faced one another in a series of increasingly violent matches.

At Double Tables, Jason had interfered in both Hack Meyers and Mikey Whipwreck's matches, incurring their ire.

ECW World Heavyweight Champion Shane Douglas had dubbed himself a "fighting champion" and was facing a series of challengers, including Ron Simmons and Tully Blanchard.

== Event ==
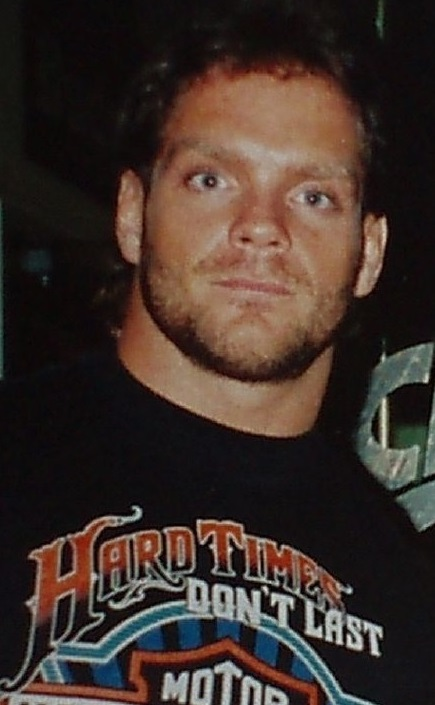
Chris Benoit (left) and Dean Malenko (right) won the ECW World Tag Team Championship at Return of the Funker.

The opening bout was a tag team match pitting Chad Austin and Joel Hartgood against the Pitbulls. The Pitbulls won a short squash, with Pitbull #2 pinning Hartgood following a superbomb.

After the opening bout, Joey Styles interviewed Raven and Stevie Richards, with Raven berating Richards for failing to defeat his rival Tommy Dreamer at Double Tables the prior month. This drew out Dreamer to challenge Raven to a match, which Raven declined. Richards then introduced "the Broad Street Bullies", Johnny Hotbody and Tony Stetson (who he claimed had beaten him up while he was air guitaring in a bar), as new members of Raven's Nest, with Hotbody and Stetson calling Raven the voice of "Generation X." Dreamer then beat down Richards and the Broad Street Bullies using a stop sign before brawling with Raven until they were pulled apart.

The second bout was a tag team match pitting Hack Meyers and Mikey Whipwreck against Jason and Paul Lauria. Jason and Lauria won the match when Lauria pinned Meyers after a masked man at ringside punched Meyers.

The third bout was a singles match between 2 Cold Scorpio and Héctor Guerrero. 2 Cold Scorpio won the match by pinfall following a 450° splash.

The fourth bout was a "barbed wire baseball bat match" between Axl Rotten and Ian Rotten. Axl Rotten won the match by pinfall after giving Ian Rotten a pancake slam onto the barbed wire bat.

The fifth bout saw ECW World Heavyweight Champion Shane Douglas defend his title against Marty Jannetty. Douglas defeated Jannetty by pinfall following a powerbomb to retain his title.

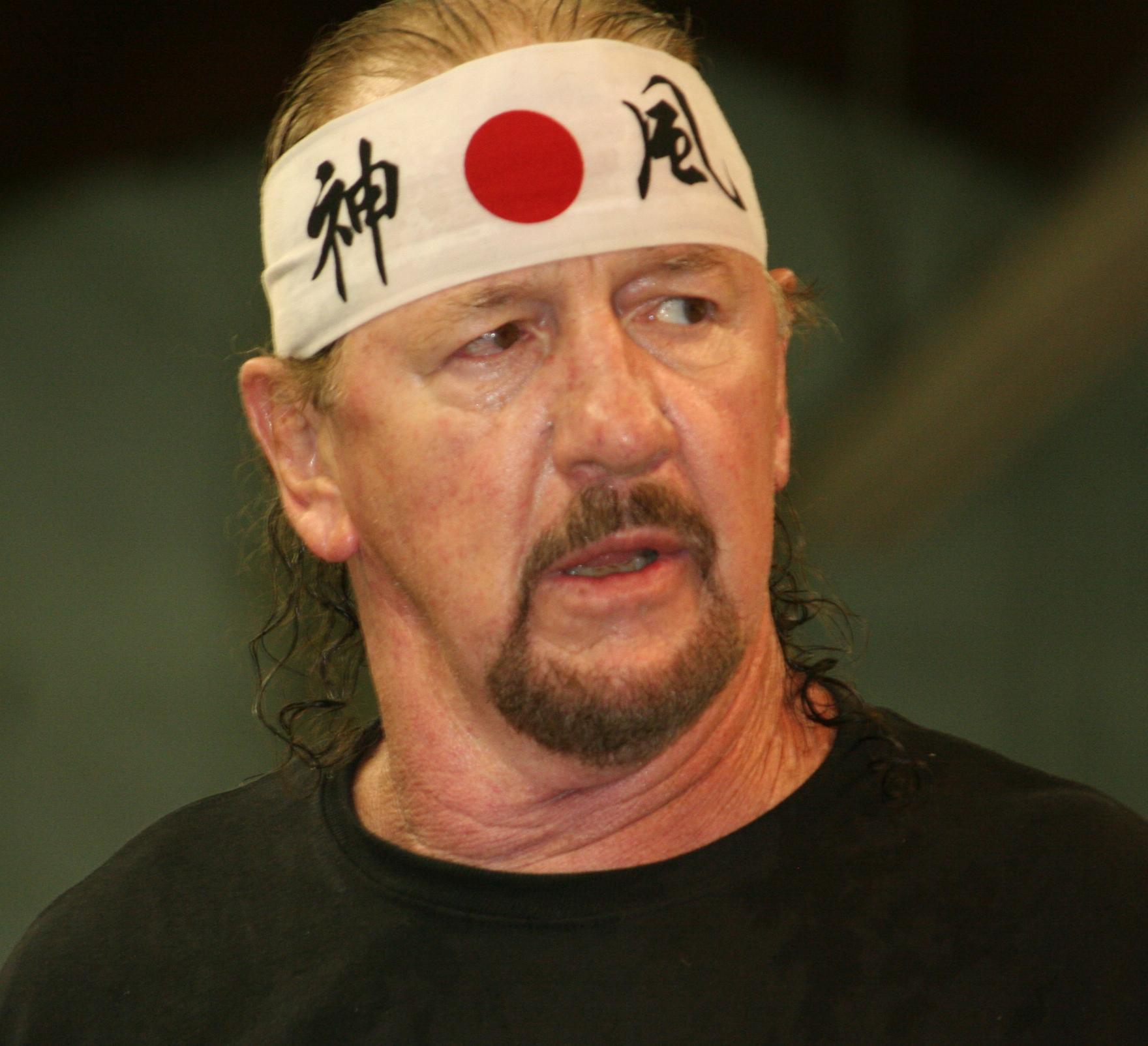
Terry Funk returned to ECW at Return of the Funker.

After the fifth bout, Joey Styles interviewed the Public Enemy at ringside, with an injured Rocco Rock in a wheelchair. After the Public Enemy insulted Chris Benoit and Dean Malenko, Benoit and Malenko attacked them, running Rocco Rock into the guardrail and giving Johnny Grunge a chair shot.

The sixth match saw ECW World Tag Team Champions Sabu and the Tazmaniac defend their titles against Chris Benoit and Dean Malenko. During the match, Malenko applied a leglock to the Tazmaniac while Benoit kept Sabu at bay; after the Tazmanic freed himself, he was unable to stand, and was carried backstage by 911, leaving Sabu outnumbered. The match ended when Sabu placed a table on the top turnbuckle, only for Benoit to use the table to give him a superbomb, then pin him to win the titles. Following the match, Benoit called out the Public Enemy, who came to the ring and brawled with Benoit and Malenko. 911 then carried the Tazmaniac back to the ring, with Sabu and the Tazmaniac joining the brawl. As the three teams brawled backstage, 911 chokeslammed the referee twice.

The main event saw Cactus Jack face a mystery opponent selected by Woman, who was revealed to be the returning D. C. Drake in what was regarded by the audience as an anti-climax. Cactus Jack defeated Drake by pinfall in a short squash following a double arm DDT. Following the match, Cactus Jack was attacked by his rival, the Sandman, and then by the returning Terry Funk (who had been absent since August 1994), both of them carrying Singapore canes. The Sandman and Funk together gave Cactus Jack a total of 46 blows with the canes. Tommy Dreamer came to the ring to try and assist Cactus Jack, but was beaten down by the Sandman. Shane Douglas then came to the ring and instructed Funk and the Sandman to hold Cactus Jack while he struck him with the ECW World Heavyweight Championship, only for Douglas to instead hit Funk and the Sandman, thus aligning himself with Cactus Jack.

== Aftermath ==
The outcome of the ECW World Tag Team Championship match led to a three way dance between Chris Benoit and Dean Malenko, The Public Enemy, and Sabu and the Tazmaniac being scheduled for the titular Three Way Dance supercard event in April 1995; after Sabu no-showed the event, he was replaced by Rick Steiner.

Raven and the members of Raven's Nest defeated Tommy Dreamer in a gauntlet match at Extreme Warfare in March 1995, then Raven defeated Dreamer in a singles match at Three Way Dance the following month. Their feud would ultimately continue until Wrestlepalooza in June 1997.

The feud between Axl Rotten and Ian Rotten continued at Three Way Dance, with Axl Rotten winning a hair versus hair match.

The rivalry between Cactus Jack and The Sandman continued at Extreme Warfare, where The Sandman and Terry Funk defeated Cactus Jack and Shane Douglas in a tag team match.

Mikey Whipwreck defeated Jason at Extreme Warfare to end their feud.

== Results ==
No.	Results	Stipulations	Times
1	The Pitbulls (Pitbull #1 and Pitbull #2) defeated Chad Austin and Joel Hartgood by pinfall	Tag team match	04:23
2	Jason and Paul Lauria defeated Hack Meyers and Mikey Whipwreck by pinfall	Tag team match	15:00
3	2 Cold Scorpio defeated Héctor Guerrero by pinfall	Singles match	11:20
4	Axl Rotten defeated Ian Rotten by pinfall	Barbed wire baseball bat match	12:20
5	Shane Douglas (c) defeated Marty Jannetty by pinfall	Singles match for the ECW World Heavyweight Championship	18:19
6	The Triple Threat (Chris Benoit and Dean Malenko) defeated Sabu and the Tazmaniac (c) (with 911 and Paul E. Dangerously) by pinfall	Tag team match for the ECW World Tag Team Championship	10:28
7	Cactus Jack defeated D. C. Drake (with the Sandman and Woman) by pinfall	Singles match	04:06
(c) / – the champion(s) heading into the match
