= ECW Extreme Warfare =

1995 Extreme Championship Wrestling supercard event

Extreme Warfare
- The ECW Arena.
- Promotion: Extreme Championship Wrestling
- Date: March 18, 1995 (aired March 21, March 28, and April 4, 1995)
- City: Philadelphia, Pennsylvania, US
- Venue: ECW Arena
- Attendance: 1,100

Event chronology
← Previous; Return of the Funker	Next → Three Way Dance

Extreme Warfare was a professional wrestling live event produced by Extreme Championship Wrestling (ECW) on March 18, 1995. The event was held in the ECW Arena in Philadelphia, Pennsylvania in the United States.

Excerpts from Extreme Warfare aired on the March 21, March 28, and April 4 episodes of the syndicated television show ECW Hardcore TV. The main event - a tag team match pitting Cactus Jack and Shane Douglas against the Sandman and Terry Funk - was included on the 1996 compilation VHS Extreme Warfare: Volume 1 and the 2006 compilation DVD ECW Blood Sport: The Most Violent Matches.

== Event ==
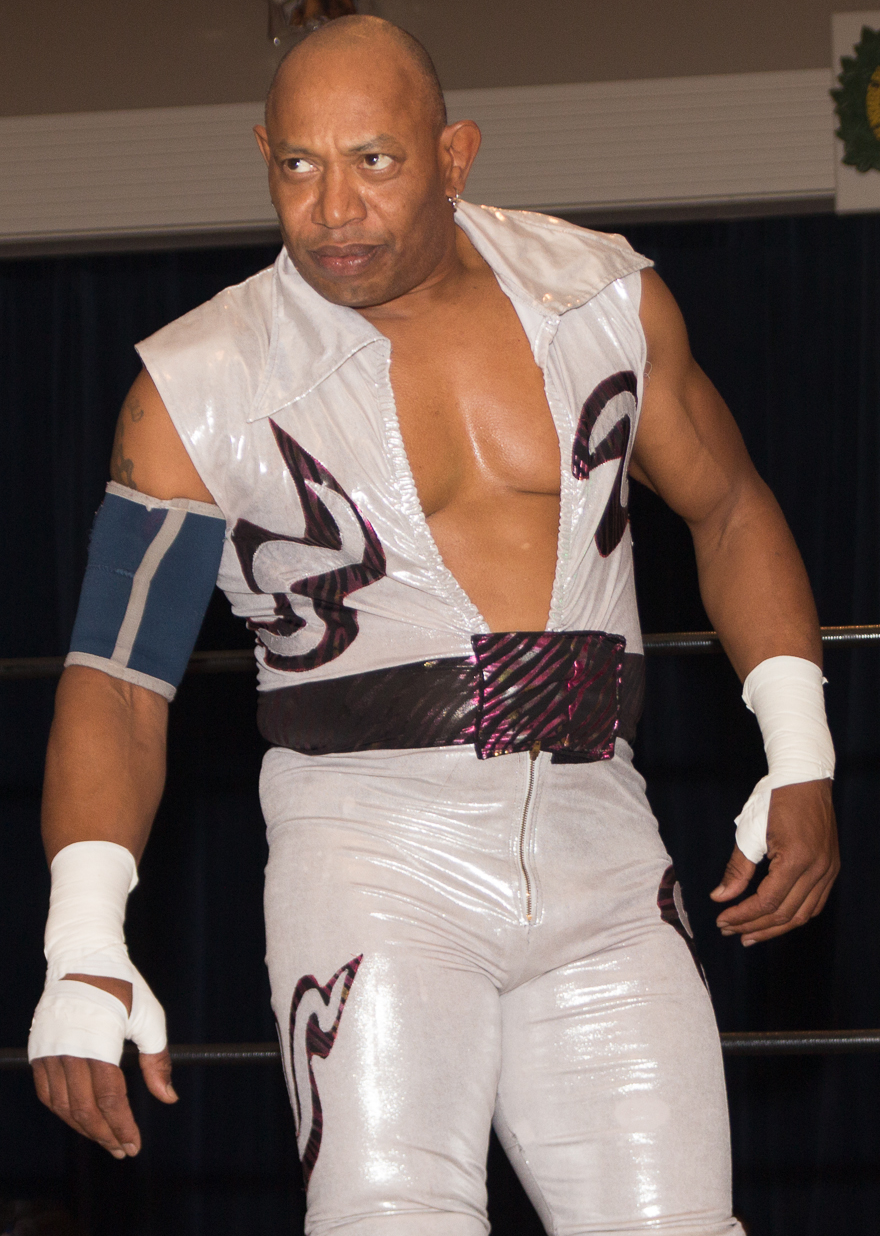
2 Cold Scorpio won the ECW World Television Championship at Extreme Warfare.

The event was attended by approximately 1,100 people.

The opening bout was a singles match between Jason and Mikey Whipwreck in the culmination of their feud. Whipwreck won the match by pinfall following a FrankenMikey.

The second bout was a singles match between Hack Meyers and Ron Simmons. Simmons won the bout by pinfall following a spinebuster. Following the match, Simmons challenged 911, who came to the ring and chokeslammed him twice.

The third bout was a "Generation X gauntlet match" pitting Tommy Dreamer against Raven's Nest (Raven, Stevie Richards, Johnny Hotbody, and Tony Stetson). The match saw the members of Raven's Nest handcuffed at ringside, with Dreamer to face all four men in succession. Dreamer first faced Stetson, pinning him following a DDT. He then faced Hotbody, pinning him following another DDT. While Dreamer was wrestling Richards, Terry Funk came to the ring and severed Raven's handcuffs using a bolt cutter. After Dreamer pinned Richards following an enzuigiri, Raven sucker punched him using the broken handcuff, then pinned him following an Evenflow DDT. Following the match, Raven handcuffed Dreamer and gave him a chair shot.

The fourth bout saw ECW World Television Champion Dean Malenko defend his title against 2 Cold Scorpio. During the match, Malenko was attacked by Taz, who was scheduled to face him in a three-way tag team elimination match the following month at Three Way Dance. 2 Cold Scorpio went on to defeat Malenko by pinfall using a roll-up to become the new ECW World Television Champion.

The fifth bout was a strap match between former tag team partners Axl Rotten and Ian Rotten in a continuation of their feud that had begun in January 1995 after they were forced to separate as a stipulation of losing to the Pitbulls. Axl Rotten won the match by pinfall.

The sixth bout was a tag team match between the Pitbulls and the Public Enemy. The Public Enemy won the match when Rocco Rock pinned Pitbull #2 using a victory roll.

The seventh bout was a singles match between Mikey Whipwreck and Sabu, with Whipwreck substituting for Marty Jannetty who missed the event due to missing a flight. Sabu won the match by submission using a camel clutch.

The main event was a tag team match pitting Cactus Jack and Shane Douglas (the then-ECW World Heavyweight Champion) against the Sandman and Terry Funk. The match arose after Funk joined the Sandman in his attack on Cactus Jack the prior month at Return of the Funker, with Douglas unexpectedly coming to Cactus Jack's aid. The match was a wild brawl that was won by the Sandman and Funk when Funk pinned Cactus Jack following a piledriver onto a flaming branding iron.

== Results ==
No.	Results	Stipulations	Times
1	Mikey Whipwreck defeated Jason by pinfall	Singles match	8:30
2	Ron Simmons defeated Hack Meyers by pinfall	Singles match	2:51
3	Johnny Hotbody, Raven, Stevie Richards, and Tony Stetson defeated Tommy Dreamer by pinfall	Gauntlet match	—
4	2 Cold Scorpio defeated Dean Malenko (c) (with Jason) by pinfall	Singles match for the ECW World Television Championship	13:34
5	Axl Rotten defeated Ian Rotten by pinfall	Strap match	14:49
6	The Public Enemy (Johnny Grunge and Rocco Rock) defeated the Pitbulls (Pitbull #1 and Pitbull #2) by pinfall	Tag team match	15:56
7	Sabu (with 911 and Paul E. Dangerously) defeated Mikey Whipwreck by submission	Singles match	10:34
8	The Sandman (with Woman) and Terry Funk defeated Cactus Jack and Shane Douglas by pinfall	Tag team match	12:56
(c) / – the champion(s) heading into the match
