= Enter the Sandman =

1995 Extreme Championship Wrestling live event

- The ECW Arena
- Promotion: Extreme Championship Wrestling
- Date: May 13, 1995 (aired May 23, May 30, June 6, and June 13, 1995)
- City: Philadelphia, Pennsylvania, US
- Venue: ECW Arena
- Attendance: c.875

Event chronology
| ← Previous; Hostile City Showdown | Next → Barbed Wire, Hoodies & Chokeslams |

Enter the Sandman (also known as Enter Sandman) was a professional wrestling live event produced by Extreme Championship Wrestling (ECW) on May 13, 1995. The event was held in the ECW Arena in Philadelphia, Pennsylvania in the United States. The title of the event referred to professional wrestler the Sandman (the then-ECW World Heavyweight Champion) and to his entrance music, Enter Sandman by Metallica.

Excerpts from Enter the Sandman aired on episodes #109, #110, #111, and #112 of the syndicated television show ECW Hardcore TV In May and June 1995, while the full event was released on VHS later that year. It was made available for streaming on the WWE Network in 2020.

== Event ==
We had {Bill Alfonso} do everything, every bullshit wrestling decision known to man. We did every ripoff finish because we had never done it before, and we put all the heat on Fonzie. We did things like reverse a decision, which we would never do. We had him call for a disqualification because someone threw a punch. [...] It was some of the most insane heat you had ever seen.
- Paul Heyman

The commentator for Enter the Sandman was Joey Styles, with Peter Senerchia providing guest commentary for the bout between Dean Malenko and Eddie Guerrero. The event was attended by approximately 875 people.

In the opening match, Hack Meyers defeated Tony Stetson using a modified diving facebuster.

The second bout was a tag team match in which 911 and the Tazmaniac defeated the Oriental Connection in a short squash, with 911 pinning both members of the Oriental Connection after simultaneously chokeslamming both men.

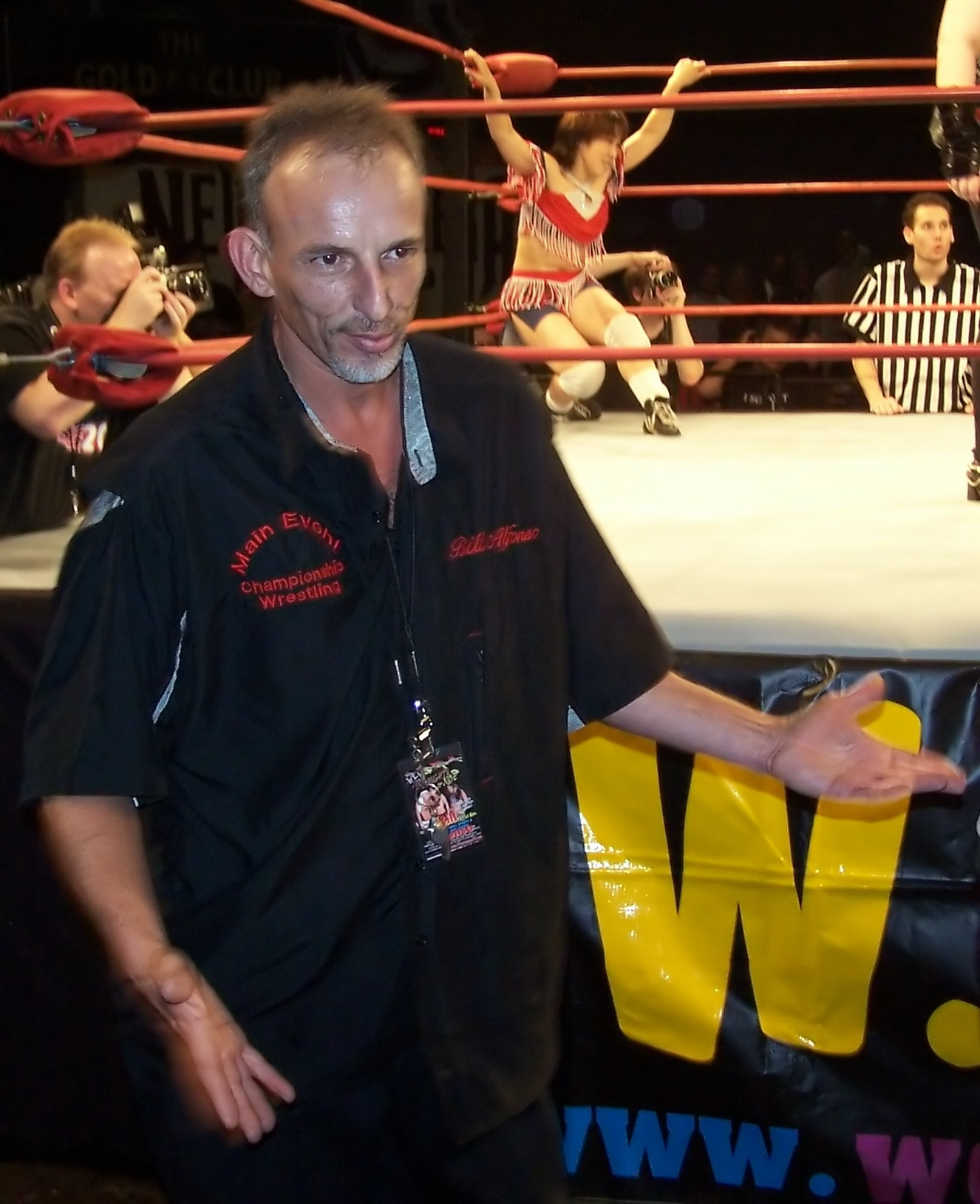
"Troubleshooting" referee Bill "Fonzie" Alfonso debuted in ECW at Enter the Sandman.

The third match was a "barbed wire baseball bat, barbed wire chair" match between former tag team partners Axl Rotten and Ian Rotten, who had been feuding in a series of violent matches. Axl won the match by pinfall after giving Ian a belly-to-back suplex onto a chair wrapped in barbed wire.

In a continuation of the feud between Raven and Tommy Dreamer, the fourth match was a tag team match pitting Raven and his henchman Stevie Richards against Dreamer and Mikey Whipwreck, who had defeated Richards at Hostile City Showdown the prior month. Prior to the match, Shane Douglas introduced Bill "Fonzie" Alfonso as a "troubleshooting" referee who would bring order to ECW; after ECW president Tod Gordon came out to remonstrate with Alfonso, he stated that the Pennsylvania State Athletic Commission had empowered him to close down ECW if he was not allowed to enforce rules. The match ended when Alfonso disqualified Dreamer for using a closed fist punch on Raven, establishing him as a figure who would draw the ire of the ECW audience by rigidly enforcing rules of professional wrestling that were otherwise largely overlooked.

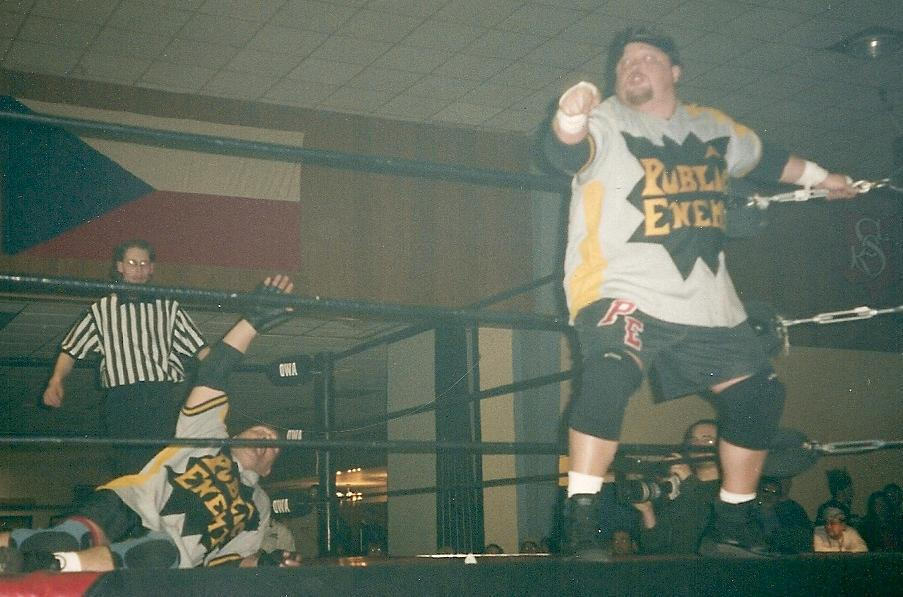
the Public Enemy (Rocco Rock (left) and Johnny Grunge (right)) successfully defended the ECW World Tag Team Championship in the main event of Enter the Sandman.

The fifth match saw Eddie Guerrero defend his ECW World Television Championship against Dean Malenko in a rematch from Hostile City Showdown. The match ended in a time limit draw after 30 minutes while Guerrero was applying a figure-four leglock.

In the sixth match, ECW World Heavyweight Champion the Sandman defended his title against Cactus Jack. After Shane Douglas interfered on the Sandman's behalf, the Sandman used the distraction to hit Cactus Jack in the groin with his Singapore cane and pin him to retain the Championship.

The seventh match saw Eddie Guerrero defend his ECW World Television Championship once again, this time against Marty Jannetty. Guerrero won by pinfall using a hurricanrana. After Guerrero defeated Jannetty, Dean Malenko attacked him until being driven off by Jannetty. Jannetty's original opponent was Chris Benoit, with Guerrero substituting for him after he missed the event due to his wife being in a car accident. This match was omitted from the VHS release.

In the penultimate match, the Sandman defended the ECW World Heavyweight Championship a second time, this time against Shane Douglas. The Sandman pinned Douglas after reversing Douglas' belly-to-belly suplex into a belly-to-belly suplex of his own, with Cactus Jack interfering to prevent Douglas from kicking-out. After the match, Bill Alfonso came to the ring to attempt to restart the match, ultimately resulting in a large brawl featuring many members of the ECW roster that ended with Tommy Dreamer unconscious.

The main event saw the Public Enemy defend the ECW World Tag Team Championship against the Pitbulls in a double dog collar match, with the special stipulation that the Public Enemy would receive five minutes alone with Stevie Richards (the stablemate of the Pitbulls) if they won. The match ended when Rocco Rock pinned Pitbull #2 following a superplex. Following the match, the Public Enemy beat down Richards until Raven intervened, ultimately resulting in a brawl between Raven and Richards and Tommy Dreamer. Raven and Richards beat down Dreamer until the debuting Luna Vachon came to his rescue, with Dreamer delivering a piledriver to Beulah McGillicutty (Raven's valet) and then kissing Vachon to close the event.

== Results ==
| No. | Results | Stipulations | Times |
|---|---|---|---|
| 1 | Hack Meyers defeated Tony Stetson | Singles match | 5:32 |
| 2 | 911 (with Paul E. Dangerously) and the Tazmaniac defeated the Oriental Connection (Hiroshi Itakura and Tsubo Genjin) | Tag team match | 2:51 |
| 3 | Axl Rotten defeated Ian Rotten | "Barbed wire baseball bat, barbed wire chair" match | 6:18 |
| 4 | Raven and Stevie Richards (with Beulah McGillicutty) defeated Mikey Whipwreck and Tommy Dreamer by disqualification | Tag team match | 8:51 |
| 5 | Eddie Guerrero (c) vs. Dean Malenko ended in a time limit draw | Singles match for the ECW World Television Championship | 30:00 |
| 6 | The Sandman (c) (with Woman) defeated Cactus Jack | Singles match for the ECW World Heavyweight Championship | 11:28 |
| 7 | Eddie Guerrero (c) defeated Marty Jannetty | Singles match for the ECW World Television Championship | — |
| 8 | The Sandman (c) (with Woman) defeated Shane Douglas | Singles match for the ECW World Heavyweight Championship | 10:41 |
| 9 | The Public Enemy (Johnny Grunge and Rocco Rock) (c) defeated the Pitbulls (Pitbull #1 and Pitbull #2) (with Stevie Richards) | Double dog collar match for the ECW World Tag Team Championship | 16:41 |
(c) / – the champion(s) heading into the match
