= HoPWF Hardcore Championship =

Professional wrestling championship

NWL/HoPWF Hardcore Championship

Details
- Promotion: National Wrestling League
- Date established: October 11, 2003
- Current champion(s): Jimmy Jessup
- Date won: March 29, 2008
Statistics
- First champion(s): Chuckie Manson
- Most reigns: Chuckie Manson (5)
- Longest reign: Axl Rotten (98 days)
- Shortest reign: Todd Hill (14 days)

The NWL/HoPWF Hardcore Championship is the secondary professional wrestling title in the National Wrestling League promotion. It was first won by Chuckie Manson in a three-way match against Morgus the Maniac, Blood and Shorty Smallz in Martinsburg, West Virginia on October 11, 2003. The title is defended primarily in the Mid-Atlantic and East Coast, most often in Hagerstown, Maryland, but also in Pennsylvania and West Virginia. There are 16 recognized known champions with a total of 23 title reigns.

== Title history ==
Wrestler:	Times:	Date:	Location:	Notes:
Chuckie Manson	1	October 11, 2003	Martinsburg, West Virginia	Defeated Morgus the Maniac, Blood and Shorty Smallz in a 3-way match to become the first champion.
The title is vacated.
Blood	1	October 18, 2003	Gettysburg, Pennsylvania	
The title is vacated when Blood is stripped of the title for showing up late to a title defense in Chambersburg, Pennsylvania on December 13, 2003. A triple threat match in held between Chuckie Manson, Jake Davis and Scott Vaughn to decide the new champion.
Chuckie Manson	2	December 13, 2003	Chambersburg, Pennsylvania	Defeated Jake Davis and Scott Vaughn in a triple threat "Pinfalls Count Anywhere" match to win the vacant title.
John Rambo	1	January 10, 2004	Martinsburg, West Virginia	Defeated Morgus the Maniac, Blood and Pirate of the Caribbean in a 3-way match.
Jake "The Machine" Davis	1	February 14, 2004	Blue Ridge Summit, Pennsylvania	
OGB	1	April 17, 2004	Newville, Pennsylvania	Won title in a Shootfight match.
The title is vacated after OGB suffers an injury during a Cruiserweight title defense on May 14, 2002.
Blood	2	May 15, 2004	Martinsburg, West Virginia	Defeated John Rambo and Ian Decay in a three way dance "Fans Bring Weapons" match to win the vacant title.
Shorty Smallz	1	July 17, 2004	Martinsburg, West Virginia	Won title in Steel chain match.
Chuckie Manson	3	October 16, 2004	Martinsburg, West Virginia	Won title in a "Fans Bring Weapons" match.
The Phantom	1	December 4, 2004	Newville, Pennsylvania	Won title in a Lumberjack Leather Strap Ladder & Chairs match.
The title is vacated on December 18, 2004, when The Phantom is unable to appear for a scheduled title defense. A singles match between Chuckie Manson and Blood is held to determine the new champion.
Chuckie Manson	4	December 18, 2004	Martinsburg, West Virginia	Defeated Blood to win the vacant title.
The title is vacated on January 29, 2005, when Chuckie Manson is unable to appear for a scheduled title defense. A 3-way match between Axl Rotten, Shorty Smalls and Blood is held to determine the new champion.
Axl Rotten	1	January 29, 2005	Newville, Pennsylvania	Defeated Shorty Smalls and Blood in a 3-way dance "Pinfalls Count Anywhere" match to win the vacant title.
Chuckie Manson	5	May 7, 2005	Martinsburg, West Virginia	Defeated Axl Rotten and Switchblade in a Triple Threat match.
The title is vacated on December 17, 2005, when Chuckie Manson retires. A 6-man "Barbedwire Christmas Tree" match is held to determine the new champion.
Shorty Smalls	2	December 17, 2005	Martinsburg, West Virginia	Pinned Switchblade in a match with Marc Mandrake, Hal Litzer and Blood to win the vacant title.
The title is vacated on February 25, 2006, when Shorty Smalls is unable to compete due to injury. A singles match between Dave Donovan and Erik Polaris is held to determine the new champion.
Dave Donovan	1	February 25, 2006	Martinsburg, West Virginia	Pinned Erik Polaris in a Barbedwire match to win the vacant title. Match held at the Potomac State College.
Erik Polaris	1	June 10, 2006	Martinsburg, West Virginia	Won title in a "4 Corners of Pain" title match.
Dave Donovan	2	September 30, 2006	Keyser, West Virginia	Defeated Shorty Smalls in a Barbedwire match to win the vacant title.
The title is vacated on November 11, 2006, when Dave Donovan is unable to appear for a scheduled title defense. A singles match between Ian Decay and Sik Rik Matrix is held to determine the new champion.
Ian Decay	1	November 11, 2006	Newville, Pennsylvania	Pinned Sik Rik Matrix to win the vacant title.
The title is vacated on March 2, 2007.
OGB	1	March 17, 2007	Chambersburg, Pennsylvania	Won Bunkhouse battle royal to win the vacant title.
The title is vacated on May 1, 2007.
Todd Hill	1	May 5, 2007	Newville, Pennsylvania	Won Bunkhouse battle royal to win the vacant title.
The title is vacated on May 19, 2007, when Todd Hill is unable to appear for a scheduled title defense. A Four Corners match is held to determine the new champion.
Chris Cline	1	May 19, 2007	Martinsburg, West Virginia	Chris Cline defeated Kevin Featherstone, OGB and John Rambo in a "Four Corners of Pain" elimination match.
Brent Rage	1	June 23, 2007	Martinsburg, West Virginia	Won in a "Slaughterhouse-Five" match.
The title is vacated on May 19, 2007, when Brent Rage is unable to appear for a scheduled title defense. A Four Corners match is held to determine the new champion.
"Jackpot" Jimmy Jessup	1	March 29, 2008	Martinsburg, West Virginia	Defeated Goldthumb, Psycrotes and Blood in a "Barbwire & Weapons" 4-Way Dance to win the vacant title.
