= Hostile City Showdown (1995) =

1995 Extreme Championship Wrestling supercard event

- The ECW Arena.
- Promotion: Extreme Championship Wrestling
- Date: April 15, 1995 (aired April 25, 1995 and May 2, 1995)
- City: Philadelphia, Pennsylvania, United States
- Venue: ECW Arena
- Attendance: 1,150

Event chronology
← Previous; Three Way Dance	Next → Enter the Sandman

Hostile City Showdown chronology
← Previous; 1994	Next → 1996

Hostile City Showdown (1995) was the second Hostile City Showdown professional wrestling event produced by Extreme Championship Wrestling (ECW). It took place on April 15, 1995 in the ECW Arena in Philadelphia, Pennsylvania in the United States. It was a "double header" event with Three Way Dance, which took place the prior weekend. The announcer for the event was Joey Styles.

Excerpts from Hostile City Showdown aired on episodes #105 and #106 of ECW Hardcore TV on April 25, 1995 and May 2, 1995. The main event bout between Terry Funk and Cactus Jack appeared on the 2012 compilation DVD ECW Unreleased Vol. 1, while the ECW Television Championship bout between Dean Malenko and Eddie Guerrero appeared on the 2008 compilation DVD Viva La Raza! The Legacy of Eddie Guerrero.

== Event ==
In the opening match of the event, Mikey Whipwreck took on Stevie Richards. After interference by Hack Meyers and Raven on behalf of Whipwreck and Richards respectively, Whipwreck delivered a FrankenMikey to Richards then pinned him.

In the second bout, Tsubo Genjin took on Tony Stetson. Genjin performed a leg drop for the win.

In the third bout, Axl Rotten took on Ian Rotten in a Barbed Wire Baseball Bat match. Ian wrapped barbed wire around Axl's head and hit him with a chair to win the match.

The fourth bout was scheduled to be a singles match between Raven and Tommy Dreamer. The event saw the incipient feud between Raven and Dreamer develop, with Raven delivering a promo in which he revealed that his girlfriend, Beulah McGillicutty (who had debuted earlier that month at Three Way Dance), had been spurned by Dreamer at a summer camp as a teenager and had now aligned herself with Raven to seek revenge. The two then began their match. Near the end of the match, Beulah interfered on Raven's behalf and was given a piledriver by Dreamer. Dreamer later described the match as the first time the ECW fans "truly accepted [him]".

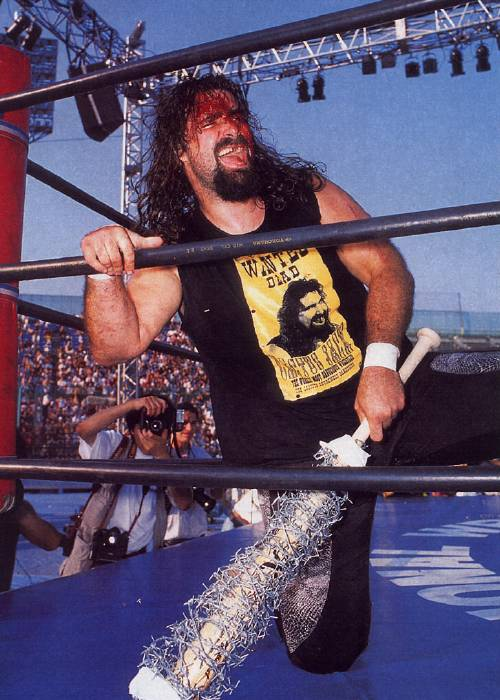
Cactus Jack won the main event of Hostile City Showdown.

The fifth bout saw Eddie Guerrero defend the ECW World Television Championship against Dean Malenko. After a back and forth match between the two, the match ended in a time limit draw. As a result, Guerrero retained the title.

In the sixth bout, Shane Douglas defended the ECW World Heavyweight Championship against The Sandman. Douglas' valet Woman struck Douglas in the knee with a Singapore cane while he was applying a crossface chickenwing to Sandman, enabling The Sandman to pin Douglas and end his year-long title reign. Woman then reunited with Sandman, revealing her alliance with Douglas as a ruse. Following the match, Douglas donned a Monday Night Raw t-shirt and insulted the audience, reflecting his imminent departure from ECW to join rival promotion the World Wrestling Federation.

In the seventh bout, The Public Enemy (Johnny Grunge and Rocco Rock) defended the ECW World Tag Team Championship against The Pitbulls (Pitbull #1 and Pitbull #2). Pitbull #1 avoided a Drive-By by Public Enemy and then Grunge tossed him into the corner and Rocco pinned Pitbull #1 with a schoolboy to retain the title.

In the penultimate match, 911 took on Ron Simmons. Simmons climbed up the top rope but 911 chokeslammed him from the top rope for the win.

The main event was a singles match between Terry Funk and Cactus Jack. As the match progressed, Mikey Whipwreck and Hack Meyers tried to interfere on Jack's behalf but Funk thwarted their interference. Jack managed to hit a DDT to Funk and covered him for the pinfall but The Sandman broke the pinfall by hitting Jack with a Singapore cane. Cactus nailed another DDT to Funk for the win. After the match, Sandman continued to attack Jack with the cane and Funk tried to hit a branding iron on fire to Jack but Jack snatched it away and a brawl ensued.

== Reception ==
Matt Peddycord of Wrestling Recaps wrote "Guerrero-Malenko is the start of something GOOD. Raven-Dreamer is historically important to the angle. There’s a changing of the guard so to speak now that Sandman is the ECW world champ. The rest is the standard procedure from ECW. Mild thumbs up for Hostile City Showdown 1995."

The Wrestling Revolution staff wrote "A complete and total one match show. Aside from being easily the best match on the card, Guerrero vs. Malenko really stands out here because it is the only match on the card aside from the opener that isn’t a wild brawl. By the time we got up to the main event, I was sick of seeing weapons already."

== Results ==
No.	Results	Stipulations	Times
1	Mikey Whipwreck (with Hack Meyers) defeated Stevie Richards (with Raven)	Singles match	7:36
2	Tsubo Genjin defeated Tony Stetson	Singles match	4:48
3	Ian Rotten defeated Axl Rotten	"Barbed wire baseball bat match"	9:07
4	Raven (with Stevie Richards and Beulah McGillicutty) defeated Tommy Dreamer by disqualification	Singles match	7:55
5	Eddie Guerrero (c) vs. Dean Malenko ended in a time limit draw	Singles match for the ECW World Television Championship	25:57
6	The Sandman defeated Shane Douglas (c) (with Woman)	Singles match for the ECW World Heavyweight Championship	7:53
7	The Public Enemy (Johnny Grunge and Rocco Rock) (c) defeated The Pitbulls (Pitbull #1 and Pitbull #2) (with Stevie Richards)	Tag team match for the ECW World Tag Team Championship	16:48
8	911 (with Paul E. Dangerously) defeated Ron Simmons	Singles match	5:31
9	Cactus Jack defeated Terry Funk	Singles match	12:58
(c) / – the champion(s) heading into the match
