= Double Tables =

1995 Extreme Championship Wrestling supercard event

- The ECW Arena.
- Promotion: Extreme Championship Wrestling
- Date: February 4, 1995 (aired February 7, February 14, and February 21, 1995)
- City: Philadelphia, Pennsylvania
- Venue: ECW Arena
- Attendance: 1,000

Event chronology
| ← Previous; Holiday Hell | Next → Return of the Funker |

Double Tables was a professional wrestling supercard event produced by Extreme Championship Wrestling (ECW). It took place on February 4, 1995, from the ECW Arena in Philadelphia, Pennsylvania. The commentator for the event was Joey Styles.

The event was a part of an Internet wrestling convention being held in the area and was named after the show's main event. Several of the bouts were broadcast on the February 7, February 14 and February 21 episodes of ECW Hardcore TV.

Chris Benoit versus Al Snow was included on the 2004 WWE DVD release Hard Knocks: The Chris Benoit Story.

== Background ==
Double Tables featured professional wrestling matches that involved different wrestlers from pre-existing scripted feuds and storylines. Wrestlers portrayed villains, heroes, or less distinguishable characters in the scripted events that built tension and culminated in a wrestling match or series of matches.

The Pitbulls had been on a roll since breaking up The Bad Breed.

Tommy Dreamer ended the winning streak of Stevie Richards, who had adopted the many identities of Scott Levy, before heading off for a tour with All Japan. Richards then brought Levy himself to ECW but now he was known simply as Raven, a man with a grudge against Dreamer and was now instilling the same hatred into Richards.

Mikey Whipwreck and Paul Lauria were once friends but the latter had struck out on his own under the tutelage of Jason, which brought the two men into conflict.

Immediately following their demise as a tag team, Ian Rotten attacked older brother Axl Rotten and began one of the most violent feuds in the promotion's history.

Chris Benoit was bursting onto the wrestling scene in the U.S. while earning the reputation as "The Crippler" after breaking Sabu's neck and would take on another rising talent in Al Snow.

Shane Douglas had thrown down the NWA World Title and declared himself the new ECW World Champion. Douglas issued open challenges to the champions of both WWF and WCW and began criticizing Ric Flair on television, saying "Flair is dead" while claiming his new stable The Triple Threat was better than the Four Horsemen past and present. These statements got the attention of one of the original Horsemen, Tully Blanchard, who decided it was time to silence the new so-called "franchise" of professional wrestling.

Cactus Jack was busy defending the throne of hardcore against the newest contender, the Sandman.

Paul E. Dangerously's team of Sabu and The Tazmaniac had been chasing the ECW Tag Team Titles held by Public Enemy ever since the hoodies had put both Paul E. and Sabu through tables several months earlier. Now, the challengers would get an opportunity to settle the score and win the titles in the first ever Double Tables match.

== Event ==
=== Preliminary matches ===
The show opens with Joey Styles at ringside and he introduces Jason. The Sexiest Man on Earth brings out his new tag team, the Pitbulls, as well as his newest talent acquisition, Jason the Terrible, from the W*ING promotion in Japan.

In the first match, Jason's team took on Hack Meyers and the Young Dragons. The Dragons put up no resistance in the contest with Pitbull #2 unmasking one and thus, Meyers was essentially fighting the match two-on-one against the Pitbulls. Jason finally tagged in and bloodied Meyers by repeatedly headbutting him with his hockey mask still on. Pitbull #1 takes out the Young Dragons on the apron followed by a pair of headbutts by Jason to Meyers before the Pitbulls flapjacked Jason onto Meyers for the pinfall victory.

After the match, Styles is back at ringside for an interview as Jason sends the new Jason to the back while Meyers destroys the Dragons in the ring. Jason predicts the Pitbulls will be the next tag team champions before Meyers attacks them with a steel chair. Meyers stalks Jason around and into the ring before delivering a top rope kneeling facebuster. This brings out Jason's valet Angel Orsini who is wearing a wedding dress and combat boots. She repeatedly slaps Meyers and berates him before he finally puts her over his knee and spanks her. Orsini appears to enjoy the treatment and kisses the Shah, which only further enrages him and he piledrives her.

Tommy Dreamer made his return to ECW from Japan and his first match was against Stevie Richards with his mentor Raven at ringside. Richards had the upper hand early, removing Dreamer's "To the Extreme" T-shirt given to him by the fans at the convention. Dreamer rebounded by using weapons from the fans including a low blow with a frying pan. Dreamer then connected with a DDT out of nowhere followed by a sidewalk slam and a top rope splash but Raven got up on the apron to distract Dreamer from making the pin. Richards recovered momentarily to crotch Dreamer on the top rope but a belly-to-back superplex was blocked and Dreamer hit a flying crossbody for a two count. This time Raven actually entered the ring and held Dreamer's arms from behind so Richards could deliver a Stevie Kick. Richards attempted a second one but Dreamer dropped down, punched Richards below the belt and rolled him up for the three count. Raven entered the ring and took off his jacket but just stared Dreamer down while Richards and the referee held him back. As the crowd berated Raven as he left, Dreamer got on the microphone and said he should go back to the WWF before starting an "E-C-W" chant and heading into the crowd.

Mikey Whipwreck took on "The Giant" Paul Lauria, with Jason, in the next match. Lauria tries to jump Whipwreck before he enters the ring but to no avail. Whipwreck throws Lauria into the crowd twice only to see the fans throw him back over the guardrail. The match turns when Whipwreck misses a plancha onto the concrete floor. Jason then front suplexes him onto the timekeeper's table and Lauria uses a chair to bloody Whipwreck's mouth. Lauria gets crotched on the top rope allowing Whipwreck to connect with a top rope bulldog but Jason pulled Whipwreck out of the ring before the three count. Mikey finally punches Jason and returns to the ring where Lauria blocks a piledriver attempt and executes a back body drop into a bridge/pin combination. Whipwreck manages to power upward out of it and reverses into a backslide for the pinfall.

The Bad Breed feud was showcased as Axl Rotten charged out to meet his brother outside the ring where the two men brawled to start. Axl bloodied Ian with chair shots as their fight reached the bleachers in the crowd. Back in the ring, Axl pounded away at the cut on Ian's forehead and then used the timekeeper's hammer to dig into his brother's arm. Ian took the advantage briefly but lost it when he dove from the apron, missing Axl and hitting the guardrail. Axl unloaded with a few more chair shots as Ian begged his brother for mercy back inside the ring. Axl pounded his brother into the corner but Ian scooped the legs out from under him and into a rollup while putting his feet on the ropes for extra leverage in securing the pinfall victory. Unhappy with the outcome, Axl hit Ian with a chair after the match and throw into the guardrails as they brawled up the aisle.

One of Canada's wrestling exports, Chris Benoit took on Al Snow in what Styles predicted would be a fantastic scientific matchup. The two men exchanged holds and counters early on before midway through the contest a German suplex/pin attempt has an impact Snow's neck. Benoit follows up with a hooking clothesline and taunts Snow to get up before continuing with suplexes and slams. Benoit asks the crowd "is this the best the United States has to offer?" A diving headbutt and powerbomb both garner two counts. Another German suplex gets a nearfall before Snow reverses out of a dragon suplex and into a Snow Plex. Snow is now in control, hitting a superkick for two and an Exploder suplex for a nearfall. Benoit reverses out of another suplex attempt into a German suplex that wipes out both men. Benoit reverses into a dragon suplex and maintains the bridge for the pinfall. Benoit continues his assault after the match and powerbombs Snow, which brings out the medics and Snow has to be carried out on a stretcher.

=== Main event matches ===
Tully Blanchard didn't wait for his introduction as he hit the ring looking for a piece of Shane Douglas and the ECW Title. Blanchard got the upper hand early, even connecting with the slingshot suplex for a nearfall. The referee counted three after a piledriver but quickly overruled himself as Douglas had put his foot on the bottom rope just in time. Outside the ring, Douglas resorted to brawling to regain control with a front suplex to Blanchard on the timekeeper's table. Blanchard recovered and was ready to suplex Douglas back into the ring but the Franchise shifted his weight and fell on top of the former Horseman for the three count.

Cactus Jack and the Sandman squared off in an old-fashioned Texas Death match. Catcus jumped Sandman during his entrance and began using chairs and a crutch to attack the Sandman early on. Cactus scored two early falls using chair shots and legdrops but the Sandman answered the count at five and six, respectively, despite the appearance of a head injury. Even after gaining control, the Sandman's behavior was out of sorts, once getting off Cactus before the three count and another instance attacking Cactus while the referee's count was only at two. Cactus delivers several cane shots to the Sandman's head as the match spills onto the floor. Cactus DDT'd the Sandman twice on the concrete floor but the Sandman answered the count both times before a third one put him down for good.

Before the main event, Rocco Rock told the internet fans they would now see some real wrestling. Sabu and the Tazmaniac charged the ring as the two teams brawled to start. Sabu hit a suicide dive on a seated Johnny Grunge as Tazmaniac and Rock brawled in the crowd near the entrance. Sabu and Grunge would soon join them as Grunge was bloodied. Back in the ring, Sabu connected with Air Sabu and an Arabian facebuster before the tables were finally introduced into the match. Grunge managed to avoid Sabu's attempt to put him through the table and Rock attacked him with the broken table leg. Tazmaniac half nelson suplexes Sabu onto Rock but The Public Enemy regrouped and took turns ramming Sabu and Tazmaniac into a table set up in the corner. Sabu throws Rock into a table but only splinters it, therefore Rock remains in the match. Meanwhile, Grunge sets up Taz on a table and goes to the top rope but Tazmaniac meets him before he can execute whatever he had planned. In their struggle, both men fall through the table and only Sabu and Rock remain legally in the match. Rock somersaults onto Sabu and puts him through a table but both referees were distracted by the Tazmaniac and so the match continues. Grunge chokes out Paul E. outside the ring as Tazmaniac sets up Rock on a table for Sabu to leg drop him through for the win and the titles.

The new tag team champions have no time to celebrate as Tazmaniac and Grunge brawl back up the aisle while 911 assisted Sabu in an attempt to put Rock through another table. Chris Benoit hit the ring and powerbombed Sabu on top of a prone Rock and through the table. The show ended with Benoit standing over Sabu while Paul E. and 911 looked on.

== Results ==
| No. | Results | Stipulations | Times |
|---|---|---|---|
| 1 | Jason the Terrible and The Pitbulls (Pitbull #1 and Pitbull #2) (with Jason) defeated Hack Meyers and The Young Dragons (Young Dragon #1 and Young Dragon #2) | Six-man tag team match | 11:20 |
| 2 | Tommy Dreamer defeated Stevie Richards (with Raven) | Singles match | 07:38 |
| 3 | Mikey Whipwreck defeated Paul Lauria (with Jason) | Singles match | 09:17 |
| 4 | Ian Rotten defeated Axl Rotten | Singles match | 06:41 |
| 5 | Chris Benoit defeated Al Snow | Singles match | 14:36 |
| 6 | Shane Douglas (c) defeated Tully Blanchard | Singles match for the ECW World Heavyweight Championship | 10:27 |
| 7 | Cactus Jack defeated The Sandman (with Woman) | Texas Death match | 15:46 |
| 8 | Sabu and The Tazmaniac (with Paul E. Dangerously) defeated The Public Enemy (Johnny Grunge and Rocco Rock) (c) | Double tables match for the ECW World Tag Team Championship | 12:48 |
(c) / – the champion(s) heading into the match
