= Three Way Dance =

1995 Extreme Championship Wrestling live event

- The ECW Arena
- Promotion: Extreme Championship Wrestling
- Date: April 8, 1995
- City: Philadelphia, Pennsylvania, US
- Venue: ECW Arena
- Attendance: c.1,150

Event chronology
| ← Previous; Extreme Warfare | Next → Hostile City Showdown |

Three Way Dance was a professional wrestling live event produced by Extreme Championship Wrestling (ECW) on April 8, 1995. The event was held in the ECW Arena in Philadelphia, Pennsylvania in the United States. It was a "double header" event with Hostile City Showdown, which took place the following weekend.

Excerpts from Three Way Dance aired on the syndicated television show ECW Hardcore TV, while the full event was released on VHS in 1995. It was made available for streaming on the WWE Network in 2020. The bout between 2 Cold Scorpio and Eddie Guerrero also appeared on the 2009 WWE DVD Viva La Raza! The Legacy of Eddie Guerrero.

Three Way Dance gained a degree of notoriety after Sabu (who was scheduled to compete in the main event) no-showed in favour of wrestling for New Japan Pro-Wrestling. As a result, he was fired from ECW and did not return until November 1995. The event also saw the ECW debuts of Beulah McGillicutty, Eddie Guerrero, and Rick Steiner.

== Event ==
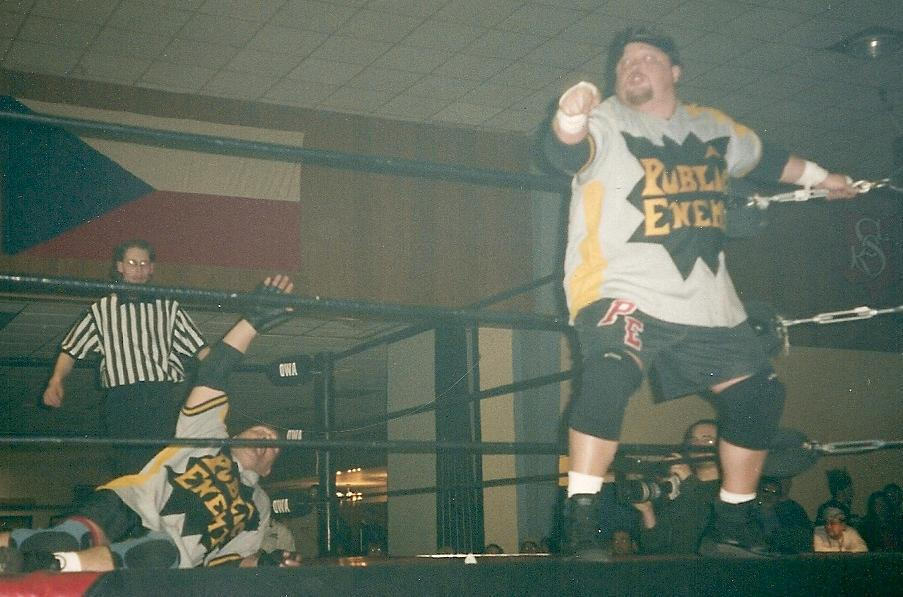
The Public Enemy (Rocco Rock (left) and Johnny Grunge (right)) won the ECW World Tag Team Championship in the titular main event of Three Way Dance.

The commentator for Three Way Dance was Joey Styles. The event was attended by approximately 1,150 people.

The event opened with ECW booker Paul Heyman informing the audience that Sabu would not be wrestling. Heyman asked the audience to wait until the intermission before deciding whether to seek a refund.

Prior to the opening bout, Stevie Richards - the henchman of Raven - informed the Broad Street Bullies that they would be fired from Raven's Nest if they failed to defeat their opponents, who were then revealed to be the Pitbulls. The Pitbulls went on to defeat the Broad Street Bullies by pinfall in a short squash after delivering a superbomb to Johnny Hotbody. As a result, the Broad Street Bullies were fired from Raven's Nest and replaced by the Pitbulls, who declared Raven to be their "master".

Following the match, Richards revealed to Raven that he had tracked down Beulah McGillicutty - an overweight girl with acne who Raven and his rival Tommy Dreamer had met at summer camp as youths - who was now a slim and beautiful Penthouse model. McGillicutty then made her ECW debut, coming to ringside for the scheduled bout between Raven and Dreamer. During the match, Richards attempted to kiss McGillicutty; after she slapped him, he began choking her. When Dreamer attempted to intervene, McGillicutty blinded him with hair spray, revealing the altercation between her and Richards to have been a ruse to trick Dreamer. Richards then gave Dreamer a Stevie Kick and Raven gave him an Evenflow DDT for a pinfall victory.

The third match was a singles bout between Mikey Whipwreck and Ron Simmons. After dominating most of the match, Simmons gave Whipwreck two chokeslams, then also chokeslammed the referee, drawing a disqualification. Following the match, 911 (whose signature move was the chokeslam) attempted to attack Simmons, but was also chokeslammed following a low blow from Simmons. After Simmons left, a frustrated 911 chokeslammed multiple jobbers.

Prior to the event's intermission, Chris Benoit and Dean Malenko called out The Tazmaniac, Sabu's tag team partner. The Tazmaniac brawled with Benoit and Malenko alone until the debuting Rick Steiner came to his assistance, revealing himself as Sabu's surprise replacement for the main event.

In the fourth match, the debuting Eddie Guerrero defeated 2 Cold Scorpio to win the ECW World Television Championship using a victory roll. Guerrero dedicated the title win to his former tag team partner Art Barr, who had died in November 1994. Writing in 2019, John Clapp of WWE suggested that the bout "brought a more scientific approach to the renegade company, giving ECW credibility in the eyes of purists who'd otherwise shun the revolution for its unabashed lawlessness."

The fifth match was a hair versus hair match between former tag team partners Axl Rotten and Ian Rotten. Following a bloody brawl, Axl Rotten pinned Ian Rotten after a chair shot. Axl then began cutting off Ian's mohawk using scissors until Ian hit him with a paint can, then used the scissors to gouge Axl's face.

In the sixth match, Hack Meyers defeated Dino Sandoff by pinfall following a brainbuster.

The penultimate match saw Shane Douglas defend his ECW World Heavyweight Championship against the Sandman. The match ended when The Sandman's valet, Woman, betrayed The Sandman by throwing his Singapore cane to Douglas, enabling Douglas to hit the Sandman in the crotch with the cane then pin him using a roll-up.

The main event was a three way dance for the ECW World Tag Team Championship pitting champions Chris Benoit and Dean Malenko against The Public Enemy and Rick Steiner and the Tazmaniac (with Steiner substituting for Sabu). Steiner and the Tazmaniac were the first team eliminated, with Malenko pinning The Tazmaniac using a roll-up following a diving headbutt from Benoit. The Public Enemy went on to win the match, with Rocco Rock pinning Malenko following a senton bomb. Following the match, the Pitbulls attacked the new champions, setting up a title match for Hostile City Showdown.

== Results ==
| No. | Results | Stipulations | Times |
|---|---|---|---|
| 1 | The Pitbulls (Pitbull #1 and Pitbull #2) defeated the Broad Street Bullies (Johnny Hotbody and Tony Stetson) by pinfall | Tag team match | 0:57 |
| 2 | Raven (with Beulah McGillicutty and Stevie Richards) defeated Tommy Dreamer by pinfall | Singles match | 8:42 |
| 3 | Mikey Whipwreck defeated Ron Simmons by disqualification | Singles match | 4:18 |
| 4 | Eddie Guerrero defeated 2 Cold Scorpio (c) by pinfall | Singles match for the ECW World Television Championship | 14:49 |
| 5 | Axl Rotten defeated Ian Rotten by pinfall | Hair versus hair match | 9:50 |
| 6 | Hack Meyers defeated Dino Sandoff by pinfall | Tag team match | 4:14 |
| 7 | Shane Douglas (c) defeated the Sandman (with Woman) by pinfall | Singles match for the ECW World Heavyweight Championship | 10:00 |
| 8 | The Public Enemy (Johnny Grunge and Rocco Rock) defeated Chris Benoit and Dean Malenko (c) and Rick Steiner and the Tazmaniac by pinfall | Three way dance for the ECW World Tag Team Championship | 19:56 |
(c) / – the champion(s) heading into the match
