= Axl Rotten =

American professional wrestler (1971–2016)

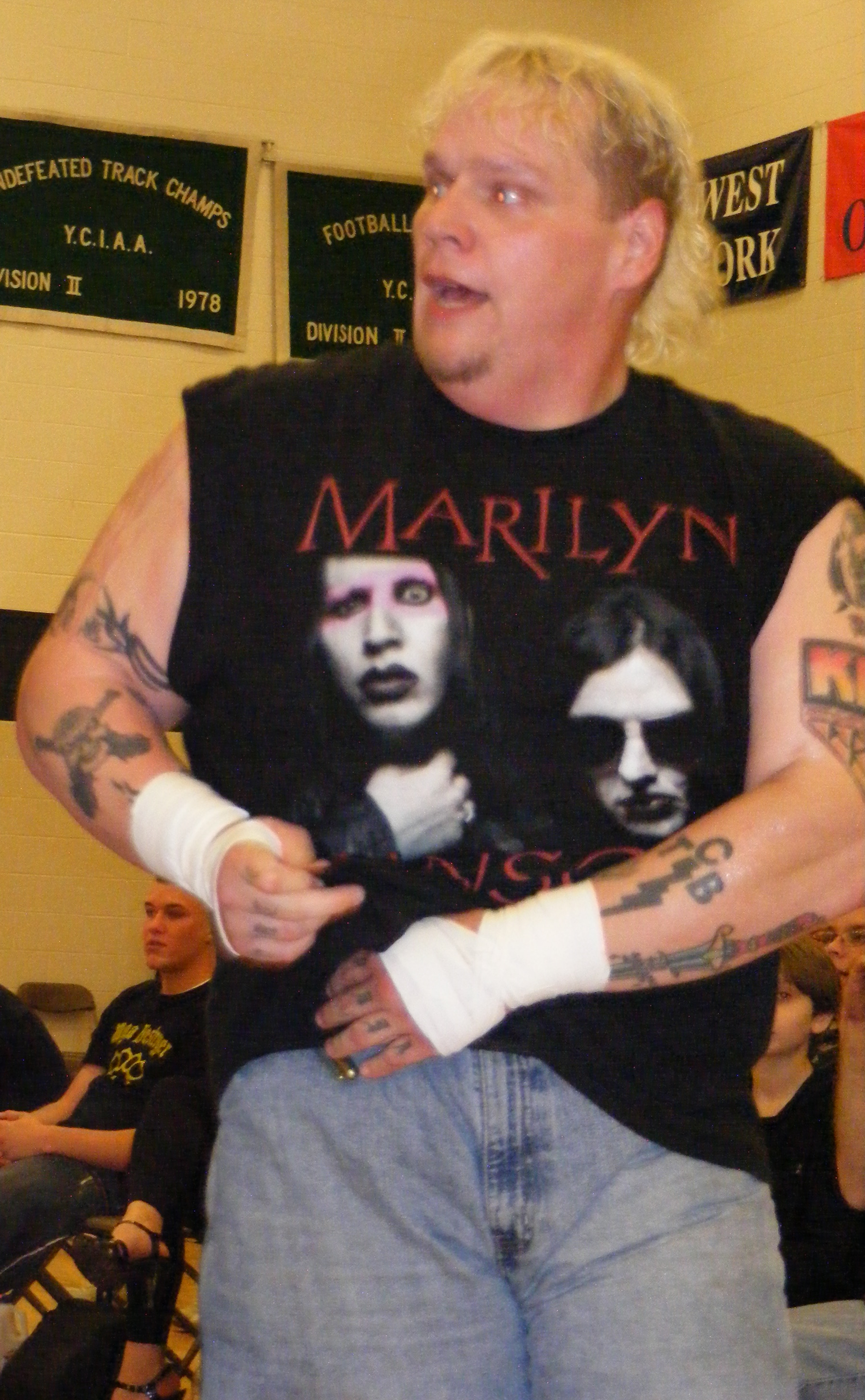
- Rotten in 2009

Personal information
- Born: Brian Knighton; April 21, 1971 Baltimore, Maryland, U.S.
- Died: February 4, 2016 (aged 44) Linthicum, Maryland, U.S.
- Cause of death: Heroin overdose

Professional wrestling career
- Ring name(s): Axl Rotten; Brian Knighton
- Billed height: 6 ft 2 in (188 cm)
- Billed weight: 277 lb (126 kg)
- Billed from: "Hostile City"; Newcastle, England
- Trained by: Ricky Lawless; Joey Maggs
- Debut: 1987
- Retired: October 30, 2014

Brian Knighton (April 21, 1971 – February 4, 2016), better known by the ring name Axl Rotten, was an American professional wrestler. In the early 1990s, he was a part of the tag team The Bad Breed with Ian Rotten. He had a short stint with World Championship Wrestling in 1991, and was better known for his matches in Extreme Championship Wrestling (ECW) from 1993 to 1999.

Bad Breed competed in ECW's tag team division in the early years of the company until the team was forced to disband after losing to The Pitbulls and engaged in a rivalry against each other that Pro Wrestling Illustrated named Feud of the Year in 1995.

After an unsuccessful singles career, Rotten formed short-lived tag teams with Hack Meyers and D-Von Dudley before forming Hardcore Chair Swingin' Freaks with Balls Mahoney in 1997. The team lasted until he departed ECW in 1999. He then wrestled on the independent circuit and appeared at World Wrestling Entertainment's ECW One Night Stand pay-per-view in 2005.

== Professional wrestling career ==
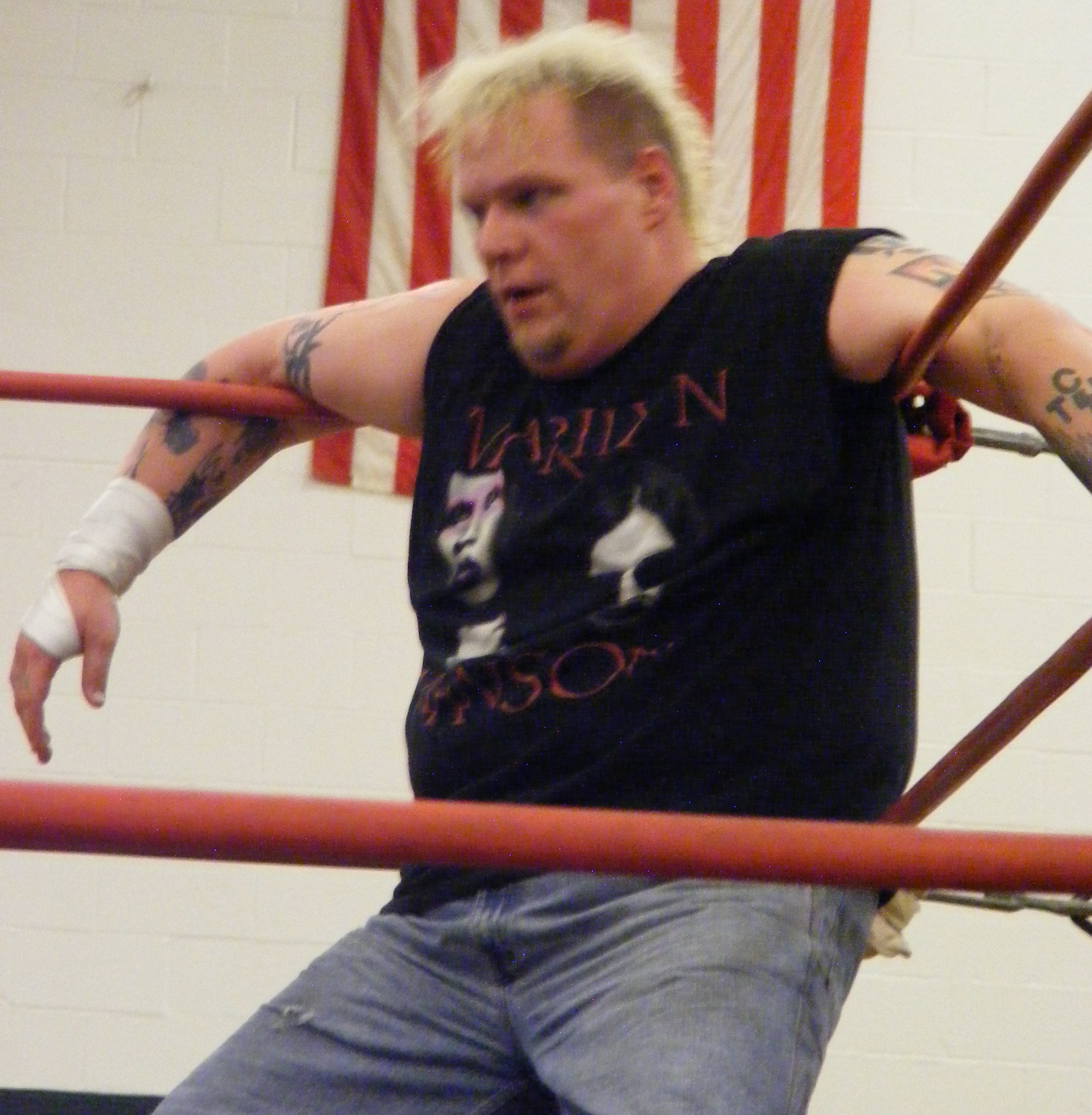
Rotten wrestling on the independent circuit in 2009

=== Training and early career (1986–1993) ===
Knighton was trained to wrestle by Ricky Lawless at a gym on Baltimore's North Avenue, receiving supplementary training from Joey Maggs. He debuted on the independent circuit at the age of 17, adopting the ring name "Axl Rotten", a portmanteau of the rockers Axl Rose and Johnny Rotten. Rotten won his first championship teaming with Lawless to win the tag team titles in Frank Cain's Star Cavalcade Wrestling during the summer of 1988. He also succeeded Lawless as the promotion's heavyweight champion when, shortly after reigning champion Ricky Lawless was murdered, he won the vacant title from The Psycho in Thomasville, Georgia, on November 30, 1988.

In the early 1990s, Rotten trained Ian Rotten, who formed a tag team with Axl, masquerading as his brother and taking his stage name from Cheech Marin's character in Get Out of My Room. The duo, known as The Bad Breed, wrestled primarily in the Mid-Eastern Wrestling Federation. Axl later opened his own professional wrestling promotion in Maryland called Universal Independent Wrestling. The promotion featured wrestlers such as the Bad Breed, Bam Bam Bigelow and Scotty The Body. It had a television series that aired on Saturday nights on the local ABC channel. The promotion closed in the mid-1990s.

From 1991 to 1993, Axl and Ian Rotten had a run with the Global Wrestling Federation (GWF) in Texas, being featured on their daily ESPN show. While in GWF, Axl succeeded in winning both the GWF Commonwealth title and the GWF Tag Team Championship, with Ian Rotten.

=== World Championship Wrestling (1991) ===
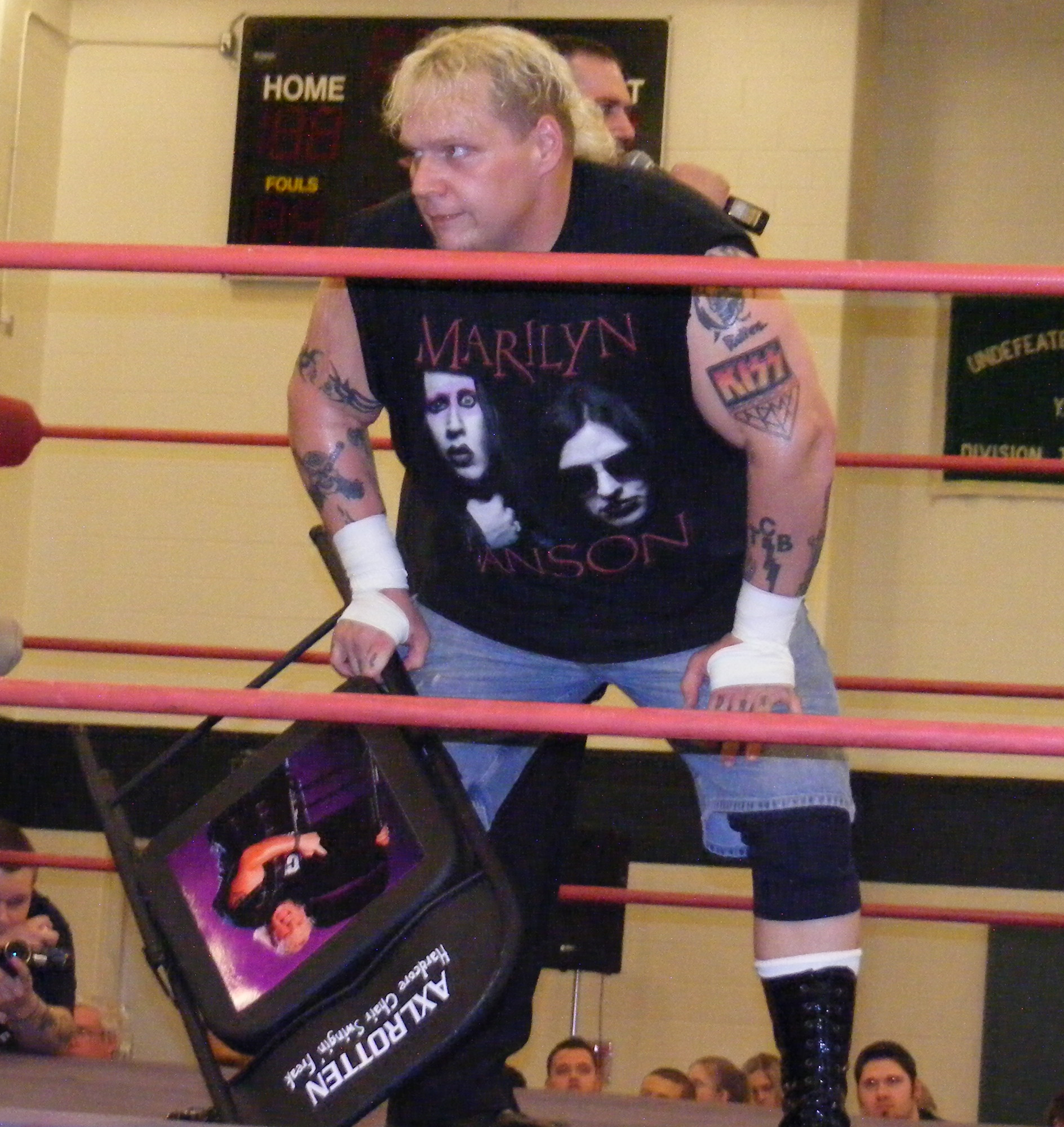
Rotten holding one of his signature chairs in 2009

In 1991, Rotten had a short stint with World Championship Wrestling (WCW), where he feuded with P. N. News. During his time with WCW, Rotten befriended Paul E. Dangerously, the future owner of Extreme Championship Wrestling.

=== Eastern / Extreme Championship Wrestling (1993–1999) ===
==== Bad Breed (1993–1995) ====
In 1993, the Bad Breed were hired by Paul Heyman, the then-booker of the Philadelphia, Pennsylvania-based Eastern Championship Wrestling (ECW) promotion as a fan favorite tag team, debuting for the promotion at NWA Bloodfest on October 1 by defeating Chad Austin and Todd Shaw. They made their televised debut on the October 5 episode of Hardcore TV, losing to Badd Company. They competed in ECW's tag team division, where they unsuccessfully challenged Tony Stetson and Johnny Hotbody for the Tag Team Championship at November to Remember. They were initially allied with Terry Funk until the team were sent to United States Wrestling Association (USWA) in 1994. Bad Breed returned to ECW on the June 21 episode of Hardcore TV, where they challenged The Public Enemy for the Tag Team Championship, which Public Enemy retained as the match ended in a no contest. Bad Breed defeated Hack Myers and Rockin' Rebel at Heat Wave, and then unsuccessfully challenged Public Enemy for the World Tag Team Championship in a Baseball Brawl match at Hardcore Heaven.

Bad Breed next entered a feud with The Pitbulls, to whom they lost in a match at November to Remember. On the January 17, 1995, episode of Hardcore TV, Bad Breed lost to Pitbulls in a rematch which stipulated that the losing team would be forced to break up. Both Rotten brothers blamed one another for the loss and Ian turned on Axl by hitting him with a chair after the loss, playing off real-life ill feelings, a rivalry developed that Pro Wrestling Illustrated named Feud of the Year in 1995. The former partners traded wins at Double Tables and Return of the Funker. They faced one another in a variety of hardcore matches over the next few months, including a hair versus hair match at Three Way Dance, a barbed wire baseball bat match at Hostile City Showdown and a barbed wire baseball bat barbed wire chair match at Enter the Sandman, all of which Axl won. A reunion was teased between Bad Breed at Barbed Wire, Hoodies and Chokeslams on June 17, where they were supposed to take on Public Enemy for the World Tag Team Championship but Bill Alfonso overruled the decision due to Bad Breed being banned from competing as a team. Their feud finally ended at Hardcore Heaven, when Axl defeated Ian in a Taipei Deathmatch.

Following his feud with Ian Rotten, it was announced on the July 4 episode of Hardcore TV that Axl would receive his very first opportunity for the World Heavyweight Championship against The Sandman at Heat Wave, where Rotten failed to win the title. Rotten then floundered in the mid-card, defeating J.T. Smith at November to Remember.

==== Teaming with D-Von Dudley (1996–1997) ====
Rotten lost to the debuting Rob Van Dam in RVD's first ECW match at House Party on January 5, 1996. Rotten would then team with El Puerto Riqueño in a loss to The Headhunters at Big Apple Blizzard Blast. His failures in singles competition continued as he would lose against the likes of J.T. Smith, The Sandman and Shane Douglas in subsequent matches. Rotten began a rivalry with The Full Blooded Italians, defeating FBI member Little Guido at Hostile City Showdown. At A Matter of Respect, Rotten teamed with Hack Meyers against FBI members J.T. Smith and Little Guido in a losing effort. Rotten then formed a tag team with Meyers as they took on The Samoan Gangsta Party at Hardcore Heaven, which ended in a no contest due to interference by The Gangstas and The Eliminators. At Heat Wave, Rotten competed against Tarzan Goto in a losing effort.

At The Doctor Is In, Rotten competed against D-Von Dudley in a match which ended in a no contest after interference by Dudley Brothers. Rotten left with D-Von after the match and formed a tag team with D-Von, thus turning into a villainous character for the first time in his ECW career. Beginning at Natural Born Killaz, Rotten and Dudley wrestled Dudley Brothers in a series of matches throughout the fall of 1996. Rotten defeated his former tag team partner Hack Meyers at November to Remember. Rotten and D-Von pursued the World Tag Team Championship, receiving title shots against The Gangstas on the December 10 episode of Hardcore TV and The Eliminators at House Party on January 11, 1997, but failed to win the titles. Rotten followed with a feud against Dudley Brothers member Spike Dudley, whom he defeated in matches at Winter Blowout and CyberSlam.

==== Hardcore Chair Swingin' Freaks (1997–1999) ====
D-Von Dudley went on to form a tag team with Buh Buh Ray Dudley called Dudley Boyz at Crossing the Line Again, which broke up Rotten's team with D-Von and Rotten moved on to singles competition. Shortly after, he formed a tag team with newcomer Balls Mahoney called The Hardcore Chair Swingin' Freaks, thus turning into a fan favorite again. The team began pursuing the World Tag Team Championship and feuded with teams such as Dudley Boyz, The Full Blooded Italians and The Gangstanators for the title. Rotten made his pay-per-view debut at November to Remember, where Hardcore Chair Swingin' Freaks competed against Gangstanators, FBI and Dudley Boyz in a four-way dance for the tag team titles, where they were the last team eliminated by defending champions Full Blooded Italians. Mahoney and Rotten often teamed with the likes of New Jack and Spike Dudley to feud with Dudley Boyz and The Full Blooded Italians.

Mahoney and Rotten were frequent contenders for the World Tag Team Championship but came up short in their bid for the titles. They received several title shots against Chris Candido and Lance Storm for the tag team titles including one at Wrestlepalooza on May 3, 1998, but came up short in their title opportunities. Rotten was out of action due to injury in September and returned to ECW on December 4 by attacking Buh Buh Ray Dudley with a barbed wire baseball bat after a match between Dudley Boyz and The Gangstanators. Hardcore Chair Swingin' Freaks would then challenge Rob Van Dam and Sabu for the World Tag Team Championship on numerous occasions including the House Party event on January 16, 1999, but failed to win the title. They also entered a feud with Danny Doring and Roadkill after beating Doring and Roadkill and FBI in a three-way dance at Guilty as Charged, resulting in Mahoney and Rotten taking on Doring and Roadkill in a series of matches including one at Crossing the Line, which Mahoney and Rotten won. At CyberSlam, Hardcore Chair Swingin' Freaks and New Jack lost to Mr. Mustafa and the Dudley Boyz in an Ultimate Jeopardy match.

At Anarchy Rulz, Rotten issued a challenge to Mike Awesome for the World Heavyweight Championship, right before the World Television Championship main event match but was confronted and attacked by Impact Players and Johnny Smith, who was the scheduled opponent for World Television Champion Rob Van Dam. Balls Mahoney and Spike Dudley made the rescue for Rotten by attacking Impact Players and Smith, resulting in Mahoney substituting for Smith and went on to lose. Hardcore Chair Swingin' Freaks would feud with the likes of The New Dangerous Alliance and Da Baldies during the fall of 1999. At November to Remember, the Freaks teamed with New Jack to take on Da Baldies (Spanish Angel, Tony DeVito, P. N. News and Vito LoGrasso) in a three-on-four handicap match, which they lost to Baldies. On the December 19 episode of ECW on TNN, Hardcore Chair Swingin' Freaks defeated Baldies members P. N. News and Vito LoGrasso in a falls count anywhere match, in which the loser of the fall would be forced to leave ECW, thus forcing Vito out of ECW. Rotten wrestled his last ECW match on December 9, 1999, in which he and New Jack defeated Tony DeVito and P.N. News.

=== Late career (1999–2014) ===
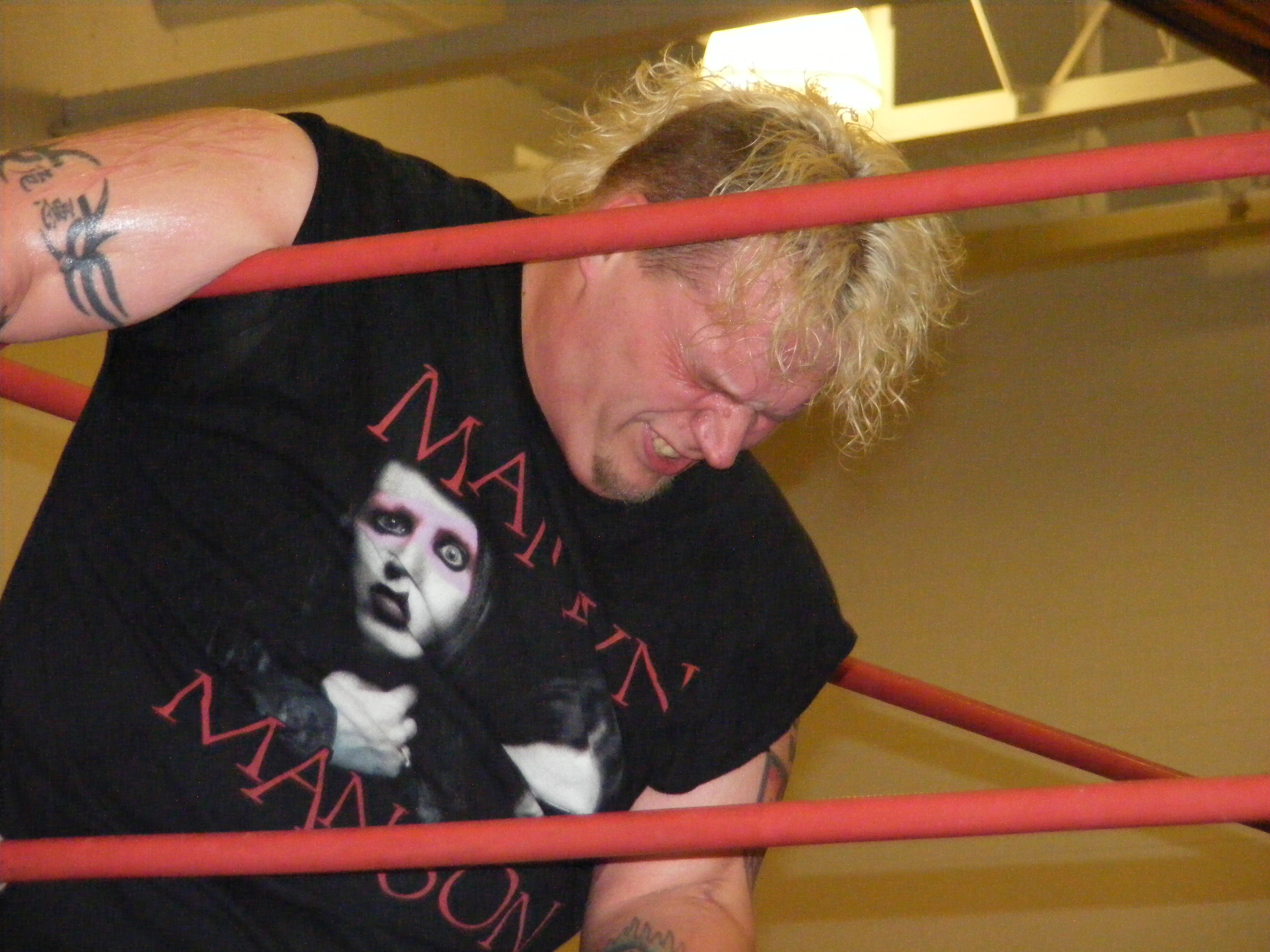
Axl Rotten in 2009

After leaving ECW in December 1999, Rotten appeared with Xtreme Pro Wrestling and the Japanese Frontier Martial Arts Wrestling promotion. Rotten then wrestled on the independent circuit throughout the early 2000s.

Rotten performed at the ECW reunion event Hardcore Homecoming on June 10, 2005, reuniting with Ian Rotten in a loss to The Gangstanators. At the follow-up event, November Reign, on November 6, 2005, Rotten defeated Ian Rotten in a Taipei Death match. Rotten also wrestled at the Extreme Reunion event on April 28, 2012, defeating Balls Mahoney. His last match was teaming with his partner Ian Rotten defeating Peter B. Beautiful and Simon Seez in a Taipei Deathmatch at IWA Mid-South on June 14, 2013.

On October 30, 2014 Rotten's back gave away, and he was left in agony on the floor. He was hospitalized and this injury forced him to retire from the sport.

=== World Wrestling Entertainment (2005) ===
In June 2005, Rotten was temporarily hired by World Wrestling Entertainment (WWE) for its ECW tribute pay-per-view, One Night Stand. He debuted in WWE on the June 6, 2005, episode of Raw, storming the ring with several other ECW alumni. At One Night Stand on June 12, 2005, Rotten, Balls Mahoney and Kid Kash brawled with The Blue World Order prior to the main event. Rotten went to wrestle several dark matches for WWE in July 2005.

=== Total Nonstop Action Wrestling (2010) ===
Rotten made a one-night appearance with Total Nonstop Action Wrestling on August 8, 2010, at the ECW tribute show Hardcore Justice. Rotten teamed with Kahoneys (Balls Mahoney), losing to Team 3D in a "South Philadelphia Street Fight".

== Other media ==
Rotten appeared in an uncredited, non-speaking role on the first episode of the show Homicide: Life on the Street, entitled "Gone for Goode", seen being questioned in "The Box" while Lieutenant Al Giardello gives Det. Tim Bayliss his introductory tour of the Homicide Unit.

== Personal life ==
Knighton was born in the Fell's Point neighborhood of Baltimore, Maryland. He attended Southern High School, leaving in eleventh grade to pursue his ambition of becoming a professional wrestler.

Knighton experienced a spine injury in his final years that forced him out of the ring and required the use of a wheelchair. He was living in Anchorage Rehab Center in Salisbury, Maryland.

== Death ==
Knighton was found dead by police in a McDonald's bathroom next to the hotel he was staying at in Linthicum, Maryland, on February 4, 2016. An autopsy showed that Knighton's cause of death was a heroin overdose.

In July 2016, his estate was named part of a class action lawsuit filed against WWE which alleged that wrestlers incurred traumatic brain injuries during their tenure and that the company concealed the risks of injury. The suit was litigated by attorney Konstantine Kyros, who has been involved in a number of other lawsuits against WWE. On October 21, 2016, it was revealed Knighton experienced CTE. US District Judge Vanessa Lynne Bryant dismissed the lawsuit in September 2018.

== Wrestlers trained ==
- Ian Rotten
- James Ellsworth

== Championships and accomplishments ==
- AAWA
  - AAWA cut up Heavyweight Championship (1 time)
- Allied Powers Wrestling Federation
  - APWF Heavyweight Championship (1 time)
- Eastern Wrestling Alliance
  - EWA Hardcore Championship (1 time)
- Global Wrestling Federation
  - GWF Commonwealth Championship (1 time)
  - GWF Tag Team Championship (1 time) – with Ian Rotten
- Independent Wrestling Association Mid-South
  - IWA Mid-South Heavyweight Championship (2 times)
  - IWA Mid-South Tag Team Championship (2 times) – with Ian Rotten
- Maryland Championship Wrestling
  - MCW Hall of Fame (Class of 2009)
- Mid-America Wrestling
  - MAW Heavyweight Championship (1 time)
- Mid-Eastern Wrestling Federation
  - MEWF Heavyweight Championship (2 times)
  - MEWF Tag Team Championship (1 time) – with Corporal Punishment
  - Match of the Year Achievement Award (1996) - with Corporal Punishment
- National Wrestling League
  - NWL Hardcore Championship (1 time)
  - NWL Tag Team Championship (1 time) – with Morgus the Maniac
- Pro Wrestling Illustrated
  - PWI ranked him #132 of the top 500 singles wrestlers in the PWI 500 in 1996
  - PWI ranked him # 437 of the 500 best singles wrestlers of the PWI Years in 2003
  - PWI Feud of the Year (1995) vs. Ian Rotten
- Star Cavalcade Wrestling
  - SCW Heavyweight Championship (1 time)
  - SCW Tag Team Championship (1 time) – with Ricky Lawless
- Universal Independent Wrestling
  - UIW Heavyweight Championship (1 time)

== See also ==
- The Bad Breed
- List of premature professional wrestling deaths
